= List of airports in Argentina =

This is a list of airports in Argentina, sorted by location.

== Airports ==
ICAO location identifiers link to airport page at Organismo Regulador del Sistema Nacional de Aeropuertos (ORSNA), where available. Map of airports.

Airport names shown in bold indicate the airport has scheduled service on commercial airlines.

City served	Province	ICAO	IATA	Airport name	Coordinates
Alto Río Senguer	Chubut	SAVR	ARR	Alto Río Senguer Airport	45°00′48″S 070°48′46″W
Ascochinga	Córdoba	SACN		Ascochinga Airport	30°59′25″S 064°14′39″W
Azul	Buenos Aires	SAZA		Azul Airport	36°50′14″S 059°52′51″W
Bahía Blanca	Buenos Aires	SAZB	BHI	**Comandante Espora Airport**	38°43′29″S 062°10′09″W
Bariloche	Río Negro	SAZS	BRC	**San Carlos de Bariloche Airport**	41°09′04″S 071°09′27″W
Benito Juárez	Buenos Aires	SAZJ		Benito Juárez Airport	37°42′22″S 059°47′31″W
Bernardo de Irigoyen	Misiones	SATI		Bernardo de Irigoyen Airport	26°15′00″S 053°37′46″W
Bolívar (San Carlos de Bolívar)	Buenos Aires	SAZI		Bolívar Airport	36°11′11″S 061°04′34″W
Buenos Aires metropolitan area	Ciudad Autónoma de Buenos Aires	SABE	AEP	**Aeroparque Jorge Newbery**	34°33′33″S 058°24′57″W
Buenos Aires metropolitan area	Buenos Aires	SADP	EPA	El Palomar Airport	34°36′35″S 058°36′45″W
Buenos Aires metropolitan area	Buenos Aires	SAEZ	EZE	**Ministro Pistarini International Airport**	34°49′20″S 058°32′09″W
Buenos Aires metropolitan area	Buenos Aires	SABC		Fuerza Aérea (Edificio Cóndor) Heliport	34°35′09″S 058°22′05″W
Campo Arenal	Catamarca			Campo Arenal Aerodrome	27°04′20″S 066°35′11″W
Carmen de Patagones	Buenos Aires		CPG	Carmen de Patagones Airport	40°46′41″S 062°58′49″W
Catamarca (San Fernando del Valle de Catamarca)	Catamarca	SANC	CTC	**Coronel Felipe Varela International Airport**	28°35′35″S 065°45′03″W
Catriel	Río Negro		CCT	Colonia Catriel Airport	37°54′32″S 067°49′54″W
Caviahue	Neuquén	SAHE	CVH	Caviahue Airport	37°51′05″S 071°00′34″W
Ceres	Santa Fe	SANW	CRR	Ceres Airport	29°52′19″S 061°55′37″W
Cerro Catedral	Chubut	SAZK		Cerro Catedral Heliport	41°09′52″S 071°26′25″W
Chamical	La Rioja	SACT		Gobernador Gordillo Airport	30°20′37″S 066°17′38″W
Charata	Chaco		CNT	Charata Airport	27°12′59″S 061°12′37″W
Chepes	La Rioja	SACP		Chepes Airport	31°21′21″S 066°35′27″W
Chilecito	La Rioja	SANO		Chilecito Airport	29°13′26″S 067°26′20″W
Chos Malal	Neuquén	SAHC	HOS	Chos Malal Airport	37°26′41″S 070°13′20″W
Clorinda	Formosa	SATC	CLX	Clorinda Airport	25°18′17″S 057°44′05″W
Comodoro Rivadavia	Chubut	SAVC	CRD	**General Enrique Mosconi International Airport**	45°47′07″S 067°27′55″W
Concordia (San Antonio de Padua de la Concordia)	Entre Ríos	SAAC	COC	Comodoro Pierrestegui Airport	31°17′49″S 057°59′47″W
Córdoba	Córdoba	SACO	COR	**Ing. Aer. Ambrosio L.V. Taravella International Airport**	31°19′25″S 064°12′28″W
Córdoba	Córdoba	SACA		Capitán Omar Darío Gerardi Airport	31°26′29″S 064°15′31″W
Córdoba	Córdoba	SACE		Escuela de Aviación Militar Airport	31°26′41″S 064°17′01″W
Coronel Olmedo	Córdoba	SACD		Coronel Olmedo Airport	31°29′16″S 064°08′30″W
Coronel Suárez	Buenos Aires	SAZC	CSZ	Brigadier Hector Eduardo Ruiz Airport	37°26′46″S 061°53′21″W
Corrientes	Corrientes	SARC	CNQ	**Doctor Fernando Piragine Niveyro International Airport**	27°26′43″S 058°45′42″W
Cutral Có	Neuquén	SAZW	CUT	Cutral Có Airport	38°56′22″S 069°15′52″W
Curuzú Cuatiá	Corrientes	SATU	UZU	Curuzú Cuatiá Airport	29°46′14″S 057°58′44″W
Dolores	Buenos Aires	SAZD		Dolores Airport	36°19′11″S 057°43′15″W
El Bolsón	Río Negro	SAVB	EHL	**El Bolsón Airport**	41°56′35″S 071°31′56″W
El Calafate	Santa Cruz	SAWC	FTE	**Comandante Armando Tola International Airport**	50°16′49″S 072°03′11″W
El Calafate	Santa Cruz	SAWA	~~ING~~	Lago Argentino Airport - closed	50°20′08″S 72°14′55″W
El Maitén	Chubut	SAVD	EMX	El Maitén Airport	42°01′49″S 071°10′14″W
Eldorado	Misiones	SATD	ELO	El Dorado Airport	26°23′52″S 054°34′29″W
Esquel	Chubut	SAVE	EQS	**Esquel Airport**	42°54′28″S 071°08′22″W
Formosa	Formosa	SARF	FMA	**Formosa International Airport** (El Pucú Airport)	26°12′45″S 058°13′41″W
General Acha	La Pampa	SAEA		General Acha Airport	37°24′02″S 064°36′44″W
General Alvear	Mendoza	SAMA		General Alvear Airport - closed	35°03′35″S 67°41′35″W
General Pico	La Pampa	SAZG	GPO	General Pico Airport	35°41′46″S 063°45′29″W
General Roca	Río Negro	SAHR	GNR	Dr. Arturo Umberto Illia Airport	39°00′02″S 067°37′13″W
General Villegas	Buenos Aires		VGS	General Villegas Airport	34°59′45″S 062°59′59″W
Gobernador Gregores	Santa Cruz	SAWR	GGS	Gobernador Gregores Airport	48°46′58″S 070°08′57″W
Goya	Corrientes	SATG	OYA	Goya Airport	29°05′58″S 059°15′02″W
Gualeguaychú	Entre Ríos	SAAG	GHU	Gualeguaychú Airport	33°00′37″S 058°36′47″W
Ingeniero Jacobacci	Río Negro	SAVJ	IGB	Ingeniero Jacobacci Airport	41°19′15″S 069°34′30″W
Ituzaingó	Corrientes	SARO		Ituzaingó Yacireta Airport	27°31′31″S 056°38′02″W
José C. Paz	Buenos Aires	SADJ		Mariano Moreno Airport	34°33′38″S 058°47′22″W
José de San Martín	Chubut	SAWS	JSM	José de San Martín Airport	44°02′56″S 070°27′03″W
Jujuy (San Salvador de Jujuy)	Jujuy	SASJ	JUJ	**Gobernador Horacio Guzmán International Airport**	24°23′34″S 065°05′52″W
Jujuy (San Salvador de Jujuy)	Jujuy			Jujuy old Airport (Closed)	
Junín	Buenos Aires	SAAJ	JNI	Junín Airport - closed	34°32′45″S 060°55′50″W
La Cumbre	Córdoba	SACC	LCM	La Cumbre Airport	31°00′21″S 064°31′55″W
La Matanza	Buenos Aires	SADZ		Univ. Río Matanza Aeroclub	34°43′42″S 058°30′03″W
La Paz	Entre Ríos	SAMP		La Paz Aeroclub	30°44′39″S 059°34′09″W
La Plata	Buenos Aires	SADL	LPG	La Plata Airport	34°58′20″S 057°53′40″W
La Quiaca	Jujuy	SASQ		La Quiaca Airport	22°09′42″S 065°34′20″W
La Rioja	La Rioja	SANL	IRJ	**Capitán Vicente Almandos Almonacid Airport**	29°22′53″S 066°47′45″W
Laboulaye	Córdoba	SAOL		Laboulaye Airport	34°08′08″S 063°21′44″W
Las Flores	Buenos Aires	SAEL		Las Flores Airport	36°04′02″S 059°06′16″W
Las Heras	Santa Cruz	SAVH	LHS	Las Heras Airport	46°32′18″S 068°57′55″W
Las Lomitas	Formosa	SATK	LLS	Alférez Armando Rodríguez Airport	24°43′16″S 060°32′57″W
Loncopué	Neuquén		LCP	Loncopué Airport	38°04′55″S 070°38′38″W
Los Menucos	Río Negro		LMD	Los Menucos Airport	40°49′04″S 068°04′29″W
Malargüe	Mendoza	SAMM	LGS	**Comodoro D. Ricardo Salomón Airport**	35°29′36″S 069°34′27″W
Maquinchao	Río Negro	SAVQ	MQD	Maquinchao Airport	41°14′24″S 068°42′04″W
Mar del Plata	Buenos Aires	SAZM	MDQ	**Ástor Piazzolla International Airport**	37°56′03″S 057°34′24″W
Marcos Juárez	Córdoba	SAOM		Marcos Juárez Airport	32°41′03″S 062°09′29″W
Martín García Island	Buenos Aires	SAAK		Martín García Island Airport	34°10′55″S 58°14′49″W
Mazaruca	Entre Ríos	SAAM		Mazaruca Airport	33°36′05″S 59°16′30″W
Mendoza	Mendoza	SAME	MDZ	**Governor Francisco Gabrielli International Airport** (El Plumerillo International Airport)	32°49′54″S 68°47′34″W
Mendoza	Mendoza	SAMQ		Ciudad de Mendoza Airpark	32°51′55″S 68°52′18″W
Mercedes	Corrientes	SATM	MDX	Mercedes Airport	29°13′08″S 058°05′13″W
Merlo	San Luis	SAOS	RLO	**Valle del Conlara Airport**	32°23′05″S 065°11′11″W
Merlo	San Luis	SADR		Villa de Merlo Airport - closed	32°21′22″S 065°01′02″W
Miramar	Buenos Aires		MJR	Miramar Airport	38°13′37″S 057°52′10″W
Monte Caseros	Corrientes	SARM	MCS	Monte Caseros Airport	30°16′19″S 057°38′25″W
Monte Quemado	Santiago del Estero	SACQ		Monte Quemado Airport	25°47′23″S 062°49′50″W
Morón	Buenos Aires	SADM		Morón Airport and Air Base	34°40′34″S 058°38′34″W
Necochea	Buenos Aires	SAZO	NEC	Necochea Airport	38°28′59″S 058°49′02″W
Neuquén	Neuquén	SAZN	NQN	**Presidente Perón International Airport**	38°56′56″S 068°09′20″W
Nueve de Julio	Buenos Aires	SAZX		Nueve de Julio Airport	35°23′54″S 060°56′16″W
Oberá	Misiones	SATO		Oberá Airport	27°31′05″S 055°07′27″W
Olavarría	Buenos Aires	SAZF	OVR	Olavarría Airport	36°53′24″S 060°12′59″W
Orán	Salta	SASO	ORA	Orán Airport	23°09′10″S 064°19′45″W
Paraná	Entre Ríos	SAAP	PRA	**General Justo José de Urquiza Airport**	31°47′41″S 060°28′49″W
Paso de los Libres	Corrientes	SARL	AOL	Paso de los Libres Airport	29°41′21″S 057°09′07″W
Pehuajó	Buenos Aires	SAZP	PEH	Comodoro Pedro Zanni Airport	35°50′40″S 061°51′27″W
Pergamino	Buenos Aires	SAAN		Pergamino Aeroclub	33°55′15″S 060°38′58″W
Perito Moreno	Santa Cruz	SAWP	PMQ	Perito Moreno Airport	46°32′16″S 070°58′43″W
Pigüé	Buenos Aires	SAZE		Pigüé Airport	37°36′02″S 062°22′40″W
Posadas	Misiones	SARP	PSS	**Libertador General José de San Martín Airport**	27°23′09″S 055°58′14″W
Presidencia Roque Sáenz Peña	Chaco	SARS	PRQ	Presidencia Roque Sáenz Peña Airport	26°45′20″S 060°29′36″W
Puelches	La Pampa	SAZU		Puelches Airport	38°08′43″S 065°55′24″W
Puerto Deseado	Santa Cruz	SAWD	PUD	Puerto Deseado Airport	47°44′07″S 065°54′15″W
Puerto Iguazú	Misiones	SARI	IGR	**Cataratas del Iguazú International Airport** (Mayor Carlos Eduardo Krause Airport)	25°44′14″S 054°28′24″W
Puerto Madryn	Chubut	SAVY	PMY	**El Tehuelche Airport**	42°45′32″S 065°06′09″W
Puerto San Julián	Santa Cruz	SAWJ	ULA	Capitán José Daniel Vazquez Airport	49°18′24″S 067°48′09″W
Puerto Santa Cruz	Santa Cruz	SAWU	RZA	Santa Cruz Airport	50°00′59″S 068°34′45″W
Punta de Vacas	Mendoza	SAML		Punta de Vacas Heliport	32°51′03″S 069°45′26″W
Punta Indio	Buenos Aires	SAAI		Punta Indio Naval Air Base	35°20′52″S 057°17′40″W
Quilmes	Buenos Aires	SADQ		Quilmes Airport	34°42′24″S 058°14′40″W
Rafaela	Santa Fe	SAFR	RAF	Rafaela Airport	31°16′57″S 061°30′06″W
Reconquista	Santa Fe	SATR	RCQ	**Reconquista Airport** (Daniel Jukic Airport)	29°12′37″S 059°40′48″W
Resistencia	Chaco	SARE	RES	**Resistencia International Airport**	27°26′59″S 059°03′22″W
Resistencia	Chaco	SARR		Resistencia Aeroclub	27°37′55″S 059°10′49″W
Rincón de los Sauces	Neuquén	SAHS	RDS	Rincón de los Sauces Airport	37°23′26″S 068°54′15″W
Río Colorado	Río Negro	SAZQ		Río Colorado Airport	38°59′42″S 064°08′26″W
Río Cuarto	Córdoba	SAOC	RCU	**Las Higueras Airport**	33°05′06″S 064°15′40″W
Río Gallegos	Santa Cruz	SAWG	RGL	**Piloto Civil Norberto Fernández International Airport**	51°36′31″S 069°18′45″W
Río Grande	Tierra del Fuego	SAWE	RGA	**Hermes Quijada International Airport**	53°46′39″S 067°44′57″W
Río Mayo (es)	Chubut	SAWM	ROY	Río Mayo Airport	45°42′15″S 070°14′37″W
Río Tercero	Córdoba	SAOE		Río Tercero Airport	32°10′24″S 064°05′18″W
Río Turbio	Santa Cruz	SAWT	RYO	Río Turbio Airport	51°36′01″S 072°13′19″W
Rivadavia	Mendoza	SASR		Rivadavia Airport	33°13′43″S 068°28′27″W
Rosario	Santa Fe	SAAR	ROS	**Rosario – Islas Malvinas International Airport**	32°54′13″S 060°47′06″W
Salta	Salta	SASA	SLA	**Martín Miguel de Güemes International Airport** (El Aybal Airport)	24°51′21″S 065°29′10″W
San Antonio de Areco	Buenos Aires	SAAA		San Antonio de Areco Airport	34°12′41″S 059°23′30″W
San Antonio Oeste	Río Negro	SAVN	OES	Antoine de Saint Exupéry Airport	40°45′04″S 065°02′03″W
San Carlos	Mendoza	SAMS		San Carlos Airport	33°46′51″S 069°04′06″W
San Fernando (San Fernando de la Buena Vista)	Buenos Aires	SADF		San Fernando Airport	34°27′11″S 058°35′22″W
San José de Jáchal	San Juan	SAMJ		Jáchal Airport - closed	30°14′53″S 068°45′55″W
San Juan	San Juan	SANU	UAQ	**Domingo Faustino Sarmiento Airport**	31°34′17″S 068°25′05″W
San Justo	Buenos Aires	SADS		Aeroclub Argentino	34°43′50″S 058°35′58″W
San Luis	San Luis	SAOU	LUQ	**Brigadier Mayor César Raúl Ojeda Airport**	33°16′23″S 066°21′23″W
San Martín	Mendoza	SAMI		San Martín Airport	33°03′45″S 068°30′30″W
San Martín de los Andes	Neuquén	SAZY	CPC	**Aviador Carlos Campos Airport** (Chapelco Airport)	40°04′31″S 071°08′14″W
San Miguel	Buenos Aires	SADO		Campo de Mayo Airport	34°32′04″S 058°40′19″W
San Rafael	Mendoza	SAMR	AFA	**San Rafael Airport** (S. A. Santiago Germano Airport)	34°35′17″S 068°24′13″W
Santa Fe	Santa Fe	SAAV	SFN	**Sauce Viejo Airport**	31°42′42″S 060°48′42″W
Santa Fe	Santa Fe	SAFE		Santa Fé Airport - closed	31°39′34″S 060°48′53″W
Santa Rosa	La Pampa	SAZR	RSA	**Santa Rosa Airport**	36°35′17″S 064°16′32″W
Santa Teresita	Buenos Aires	SAZL	SST	Santa Teresita Airport	36°32′32″S 056°43′18″W
Santiago del Estero	Santiago del Estero	SANE	SDE	**Vicecomodoro Ángel de la Paz Aragonés Airport**	27°45′56″S 064°18′36″W
Sarmiento	Chubut	SAVM	OLN	Lago Musters Airport	45°34′30″S 69°04′40″W
Sierra Grande (es)	Río Negro	SAVS	SGV	Sierra Grande Airport	41°35′28″S 65°20′23″W
Sunchales	Santa Fe	SAFS	NCJ	Sunchales Aeroclub Airport	30°57′25″S 61°31′45″W
Tandil	Buenos Aires	SAZT	TDL	Tandil Airport (Héroes de Malvinas Airport)	37°14′14″S 59°13′40″W
Tartagal	Salta	SAST	TTG	Tartagal "General Enrique Mosconi" Airport	22°37′09″S 63°47′35″W
Termas de Río Hondo	Santiago del Estero	SANR	RHD	**Termas de Río Hondo Airport**	27°30′52″S 64°54′20″W
Tinogasta	Catamarca	SANI		Tinogasta Airport - closed	28°02′27″S 67°34′40″W
Tolhuin	Tierra del Fuego	SAWL		Tolhuin Lago Fagnano Airport	54°29′59″S 067°10′20″W
Trelew	Chubut	SAVT	REL	**Almirante Marco Andrés Zar Airport**	43°12′37″S 065°16′13″W
Trenque Lauquen	Buenos Aires	SAET		Ñanco Lauquen Airport	35°58′16″S 062°46′21″W
Tres Arroyos	Buenos Aires	SAZH	OYO	Tres Arroyos Airport	38°23′13″S 060°19′47″W
Tucumán (San Miguel de Tucumán)	Tucumán	SANT	TUC	**Teniente Benjamín Matienzo International Airport**	26°50′27″S 065°06′17″W
Tucumán (San Miguel de Tucumán)	Tucumán			Mauricio Gilli Aerodrome	26°47′45″S 065°18′34″W
Ushuaia	Tierra del Fuego	SAWH	USH	**Ushuaia – Malvinas Argentinas International Airport**	54°50′35″S 068°17′44″W
Ushuaia	Tierra del Fuego	SAWO		Ushuaia Aeroclub	54°49′22″S 068°18′16″W
Uspallata	Mendoza	SAMU		Uspallata Airport	32°32′20″S 069°20′46″W
Valcheta	Río Negro		VCF	Valcheta Airport - closed	40°41′59″S 066°08′58″W
Viedma	Río Negro	SAVV	VDM	**Gobernador Edgardo Castello Airport**	40°52′09″S 063°00′01″W
Villa Ángela	Chaco	SARV		Villa Angela Airport	27°35′42″S 060°41′03″W
Villa de Soto (es)	Córdoba	SACS		Villa de Soto Airport	30°52′32″S 064°59′35″W
Villa del Totoral	Córdoba	SACM		Villa General Mitre Airport - closed	30°41′58″S 64°02′20″W
Villa Dolores	Córdoba	SAOD	VDR	Villa Dolores Airport	31°56′43″S 065°08′47″W
Villa Gesell	Buenos Aires	SAZV	VLG	Villa Gesell Airport	37°14′07″S 057°01′45″W
Villa María	Córdoba	SAOV	VMR	Presidente Néstor Kirchner Regional Airport	32°19′10″S 63°13′35″W
Villa de María del Río Seco	Córdoba	SACV		Villa María de Río Seco Airport - closed	29°55′29″S 063°38′38″W
Villa Mercedes	San Luis	SAOR	VME	**Villa Reynolds Airport**	33°43′30″S 065°22′41″W
Villaguay	Entre Ríos	SAAU		Villaguay Aerodrome	31°51′03″S 059°04′23″W
Zapala	Neuquén	SAHZ	APZ	Zapala Airport	38°58′31″S 070°06′49″W

== See also ==
- Transportation in Argentina
- Argentine Air Force
- List of airports in Argentina by ICAO code
- List of airline destinations in Argentina
