= Villa de Merlo Airport =

Airport in Argentina

- IATA: none; ICAO: SADR

Summary
- Airport type: Closed
- Serves: Villa de Merlo, Argentina
- Elevation AMSL: 80 ft (24 m)
- Coordinates: 32°21′20″S 65°01′02″W

Map
- Location in Argentina

Runways
Direction	Length		Surface
Direction	ft	m	Surface
Closed
- Source: Landings.com Google Maps

Villa de Merlo Airport (ICAO: SADR) was a public use airport serving the town of Villa de Merlo, San Luis, Argentina.

Google Earth Historical Imagery (10/28/2003) shows a 1,220 metres (4,000 ft) asphalt runway just south of the town. The (4/16/2010) image shows the runway converted to a street with trees planted alongside its length. Subsequent and current images show progressive construction activity.

The Valle del Conlara Airport is 16 kilometres (10 mi) west of Villa de Merlo.

== See also ==
- Transport in Argentina
- List of airports in Argentina
