= Dolores Airport =

Dolores Airport may refer to:

- Dolores Airport (Argentina)
- Dolores Airport (Philippines)
