= Quintero Airport =

Airport in Valparaíso Region, Chile

- IATA: none; ICAO: SCER

Summary
- Airport type: Public/Military
- Serves: Quintero, Chile
- Elevation AMSL: 12 ft / 4 m
- Coordinates: 32°47′30″S 71°31′15″W

Map
- Location of Quintero Airport in Chile

Runways
Direction	Length		Surface
Direction	m	ft	Surface
18/36	2,260	7,415	Concrete
02/20	1,200	3,937	Concrete
- Sources: Landings.com Google Maps GCM

Quintero Airport (Spanish: Aeropuerto de Quintero; (ICAO: SCER) is an airport serving Quintero, a Pacific coastal city in the Valparaíso Region of Chile.

Runway 20 has a 140-metre (460 ft) paved overrun. Runway 18 has a 150-metre (490 ft) paved overrun and a 330-metre (1,080 ft) displaced threshold. Approaches from the north to both runways are over the water.

The Ventanas VOR-DME (Ident: VTN) and Qintero non-directional beacon (Ident: ERO) are co-located across the bay 3.0 nautical miles (5.6 km) off the approach threshold of Runway 20.

== See also ==
- Transport in Chile
- List of airports in Chile
