= La Paz Aeroclub =

Airport in Argentina

La Paz Aeroclub Aeroclub de La Paz
- IATA: none; ICAO: none

Summary
- Airport type: Public
- Serves: La Paz, Argentina
- Elevation AMSL: 220 ft / 67 m
- Coordinates: 30°44′38″S 59°34′10″W

Map
- Location of airport in Argentina

Runways
Direction	Length		Surface
Direction	m	ft	Surface
07/25	1,000	3,281	Grass
- Source: Landings.com Google Maps GCM

La Paz Aeroclub (Spanish: Aeroclub de La Paz, ) is a public use airport located 6 kilometres (4 mi) east of La Paz, a town on the Paraná River in Entre Ríos Province, Argentina.

== See also ==
- Transport in Argentina
- List of airports in Argentina
