= Sierra Grande Airport =

Airport in Argentina

Sierra Grande Airport Aeropuerto Sierra Grande
- IATA: SGV; ICAO: SAVS

Summary
- Airport type: Public
- Serves: Sierra Grande (es), Argentina
- Elevation AMSL: 688 ft / 210 m
- Coordinates: 41°35′35″S 65°20′25″W

Map
- Location of airport in Argentina

Runways
Direction	Length		Surface
Direction	m	ft	Surface
03/21	2,115	6,939	Gravel
- Source: Landings.com Google Maps GCM SkyVector

Sierra Grande Airport (Spanish: Aeropuerto Sierra Grande, IATA: SGV, ICAO: SAVS) is a public use airport 2 kilometres (1 mi) northeast of Sierra Grande (es), a town in the Río Negro Province of Argentina.

There are hills 3 kilometres (2 mi) southwest of the airport.

== See also ==
- Transport in Argentina
- List of airports in Argentina
