= Villa Dolores Airport =

Airport in Argentina

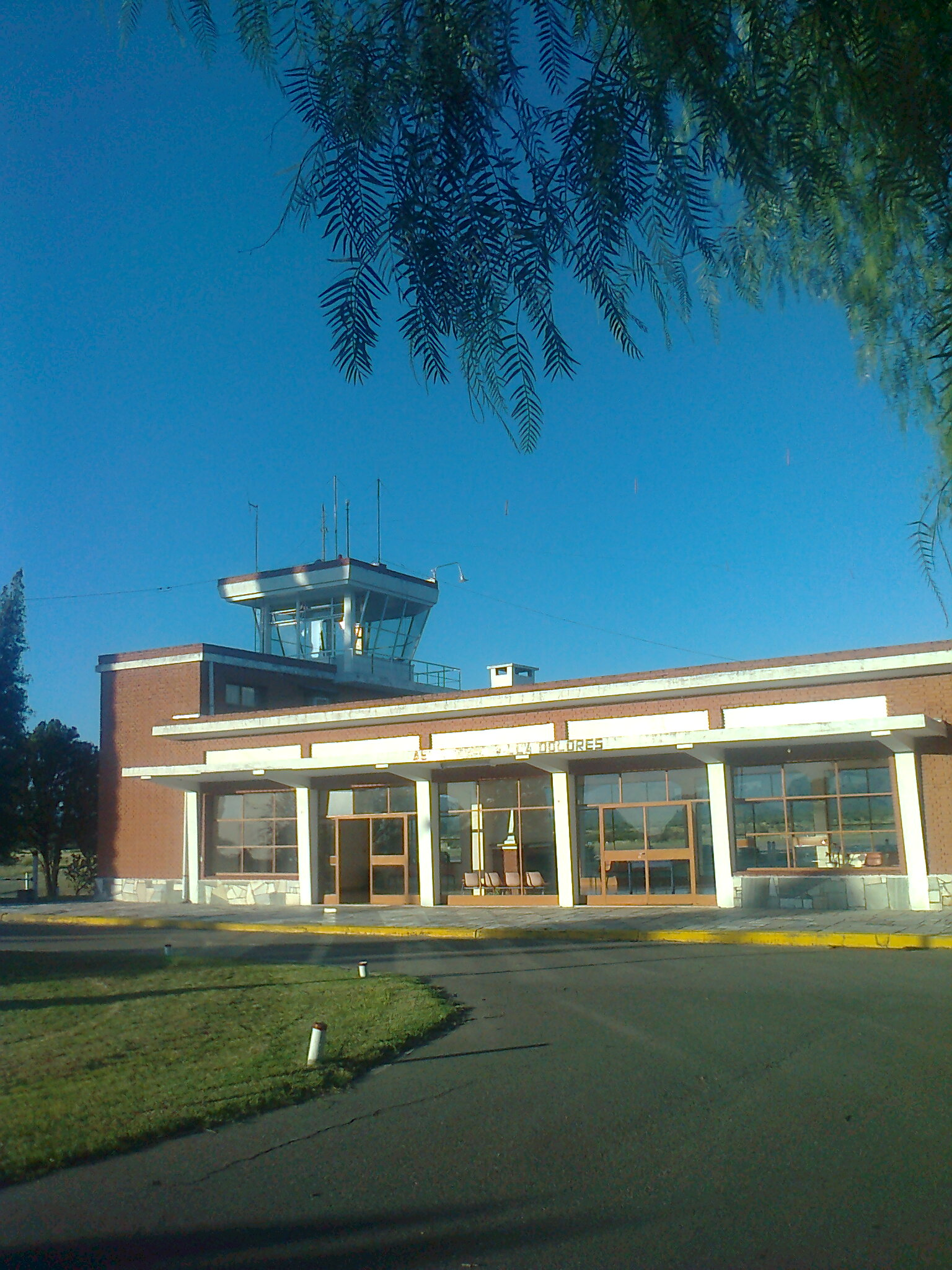
- IATA: VDR; ICAO: SAOD

Summary
- Airport type: Military/Public
- Serves: Villa Dolores, Argentina
- Elevation AMSL: 1,847 ft / 563 m
- Coordinates: 31°56′45″S 65°08′50″W

Map
- Location of the airport in Argentina

Runways
| Direction | Length | | Surface |
| Direction | m | ft | Surface |
|---|---|---|---|
| 02/20 | 848 | 2,782 | Grass |
| 17/35 | 1,400 | 4,593 | Asphalt |
- Sources: World Aero Data Google Maps

Villa Dolores Airport (IATA: VDR, ICAO: SAOD) is an airport serving Villa Dolores, a city in the Córdoba Province of Argentina. The airport is on the eastern end of the city.

There is distant rising terrain to the east. Runway 35 length includes a 150 metres (490 ft) displaced threshold. The Villa Dolores non-directional beacon (Ident: LDR) is located on the field.

== See also ==
- Transport in Argentina
- List of airports in Argentina
