= Univ. Río Matanza Aeroclub =

Airport in Argentina

Aeroclub Universitario Centro Universitario de Aviación
- IATA: none; ICAO: SADZ

Summary
- Airport type: Public
- Owner: Centro Universitario de Aviación
- Operator: Univ. Aeroclub
- Serves: La Matanza Partido, Argentina
- Elevation AMSL: 9 ft / 3 m
- Coordinates: 34°43′35″S 58°30′05″W

Map
- Location of airport in Argentina

Runways
Direction	Length		Surface
Direction	m	ft	Surface
17/35	785	2,575	Grass
09/27	508	1,667	Grass
- Source: Landings.com Google Maps GCM

Centro Universitario de Aviación (Spanish: Matanza/Aeroclub Universitario, ICAO: SADZ) is an airport serving La Matanza Partido, a southern district in the Greater Buenos Aires conurbation. The airport is located within a bend of the Matanza River in the partido.

The airport was begun by the Centro Universitario de Aviación in 1929 as a center for pilot training.

Approaches to Runway 27 and Runway 35 are over residential areas, and both runways have displaced thresholds, not included in runway length.

The Ezeiza VOR-DME (Ident: EZE) is located 6.1 nautical miles (11 km) south-southeast of the airport.

== See also ==
- Transport in Argentina
- List of airports in Argentina
