= Saca =

Saca or SACA may refer to:

== Geography ==
- Šaca, a borough in Slovakia
- Saca Peak, Gurghiu Mountains, Mureș County, Romania
- Saca (river), Suceava County, Romania
- Saca, a village in Budureasa Commune, Bihor County, Romania
- Saca, a village in Ghelăuza Commune, Strășeni district, Moldova
- Saca, a place mentioned in Kharoshthi documents that has been identified with Endere, an archaeological site in the southern Taklamakan Desert

== SACA ==
- South Australian Chess Association
- South Australian Cricket Association
- Singapore Amateur Cycling Association
- SACA, Singapore After-Care Association
- Southern Alberta Curling Association, the regional governing body for the sport of curling in Southern Alberta prior to 2018
- Southern Arizona Community Academy, a school in Tucson, Arizona, United States
- Southwest Atlanta Christian Academy, a school in Georgia, United States
- ICAO airport code for Capitán Omar Darío Gerardi Airport, a military airport in Córdoba, Argentina

== People ==
- Saca (born 2003), American singer-songwriter
- Antonio Saca (born 1965), former president of El Salvador
- Serafim Saca (1935-2011), Moldovan writer

== Other uses ==
- Sacas de presos, a Spanish term for the process of extraction of convicts from prison and their subsequent irregular killings, particularly during the Spanish Civil War.

== See also ==
- Saka (disambiguation)
