= MJR =

MJR may refer to:

- Manjusri Secondary School, a secondary school in Ubi, Singapore
- Melbourne Jewish Radio
- Mėnuo Juodaragis, Baltic culture festival
- MJR Digital Cinemas, a movie theater chain in Michigan, United States
- M. J. Radhakrishnan (died 2019), Indian cinematographer
- Miramar Airport, Argentina (IATA code: MJR)

== See also ==
- Major (rank) (military rank), abbreviated as Mjr.
