= Chepes Airport =

- IATA: none; ICAO: SACP

Summary
- Airport type: Public
- Serves: Chepes
- Location: Argentina
- Elevation AMSL: 2,159 ft / 658 m
- Coordinates: 31°21′20.8″S 66°35′27.2″W

Map
- Location of Chepes Airport in Argentina

Runways
| Direction | Length | | Surface |
| Direction | m | ft | Surface |
|---|---|---|---|
| 09/27 | 975 | 3,200 | GRASS |
- Source: Landings.com

Chepes Airport (ICAO: SACP) is a public use airport located 1 nm south of Chepes, La Rioja, Argentina.

== See also ==
- List of airports in Argentina
