= Rincón de los Sauces Airport =

Airport in Argentina

Rincón de Los Sauces Airport Aeropuerto Rincón de Los Sauces
- IATA: RDS; ICAO: SAHS

Summary
- Airport type: Public
- Serves: Rincón de los Sauces, Argentina
- Elevation AMSL: 1,969 ft / 600 m
- Coordinates: 37°23′27″S 68°54′10″W

Map
- Location of airport in Argentina

Runways
Direction	Length		Surface
Direction	m	ft	Surface
10/28	1,620	5,315	Asphalt
- Source: Landings.com Google Maps GCM

Rincón de Los Sauces Airport (Spanish: Aeropuerto Rincón de Los Sauces, IATA: RDS, ICAO: SAHS) is a public use airport on the east side of Rincón de los Sauces, a town in the Neuquén Province of Argentina.

Runway length includes displaced thresholds of 725 metres (2,379 ft) on Runway 10, and 190 metres (620 ft) on Runway 28.

== See also ==
- Transport in Argentina
- List of airports in Argentina
