= MJZ =

MJZ or Mjz can refer to:

- Mirny Airport, an airport near Mirny, Republic of Sakha (Yakutia), Russia, by IATA code
- Majhi language, a threatened Indo-Aryan language spoken in Nepal, by ISO 639 code
- Morton/Jankel/Zander, a production company that produced the 2009 TV ad The Life (advertisement) to promote Microsoft
- Majzlanite, a mineral; see List of mineral symbols#M
- Marcos Juarez VOR, a very high frequency omnirange station located on the airfield of Marcos Juárez Airport near Marcos Juárez, Argentina
