= Presidente Néstor Kirchner Regional Airport =

Villa María Regional Airport
- IATA: VMR; ICAO: SOAV

Summary
- Airport type: Public
- Serves: Villa María, Argentina
- Elevation AMSL: 670 ft / 204 m
- Coordinates: 32°19′10″S 63°13′35″W

Map
- Location of the airport in Argentina

Runways
Direction	Length		Surface
Direction	m	ft	Surface
02/20	1,800	5,906	Concrete
- Source: FallingRain Google Maps

Villa María Regional Airport (IATA: VMR, ICAO: SAOV) is an airport serving the city of Villa María in the Córdoba Province of Argentina. The airport is 7 kilometres (4 mi) north of Villa María, and replaces the closed Villa María Airport (IATA: MRA, ICAO: SAOI).

Runway length includes a 160 metres (520 ft) displaced threshold on Runway 02.

The Marcos Juarez VOR (Ident: MJZ) is located 58.3 nautical miles (108 km) east-southeast of the airport.

== Airlines and destinations ==
Airlines	Cities
Humming Airways	Buenos Aires-Aeroparque, Venado Tuerto
Total: 2 destinations, 1 country, 1 airline

== See also ==
- Transport in Argentina
- List of airports in Argentina
