= San Martín Airport =

Airport in Argentina

San Martín Airport Aeropuerto San Martín
- IATA: none; ICAO: SAMI; LID: STI

Summary
- Airport type: Public
- Serves: San Martín, Argentina
- Elevation AMSL: 2,142 ft / 653 m
- Coordinates: 33°3′45″S 68°30′30″W

Map
- Location of San Martín Airport in Argentina

Runways
Direction	Length		Surface
Direction	m	ft	Surface
03/21	1,551	5,089	Asphalt
04/22	700	2,297	Dirt
- Source: Landings.com Google Maps GCM

San Martín Airport (Spanish: Aeropuerto San Martín, ICAO: SAMI) is a public use airport located 4 kilometres (2 mi) northwest of San Martín, a city in the Mendoza Province of Argentina.

Runway length includes a 300 metres (980 ft) displaced threshold and a 110 metres (360 ft) paved overrun on Runway 03. Runway 22 has an additional 450 metres (1,480 ft) of unpaved overrun. There are power lines short of Runway 03.

The El Plumerillo non-directional beacon (Ident: D) is located 18.9 nautical miles (35 km) northwest of San Martín Airport. The Mendoza VOR-DME (Ident: DOZ) is located 19.8 nautical miles (37 km) northwest of the airport.

== See also ==
- Transport in Argentina
- List of airports in Argentina
