= Tinogasta Airport =

Airport in Argentina (closed)

Tinogasta Airport Aeropuerto de Tinogasta
- IATA: none; ICAO: SANI

Summary
- Airport type: Closed
- Serves: Tinogasta, Argentina
- Elevation AMSL: 3,940 ft / 1,201 m
- Coordinates: 28°2′27″S 67°34′40″W

Map
- Location of airport in Argentina

Runways
Direction	Length		Surface
Direction	ft	m	Surface
Closed
- Source: Our Airports Landings.com Google Maps

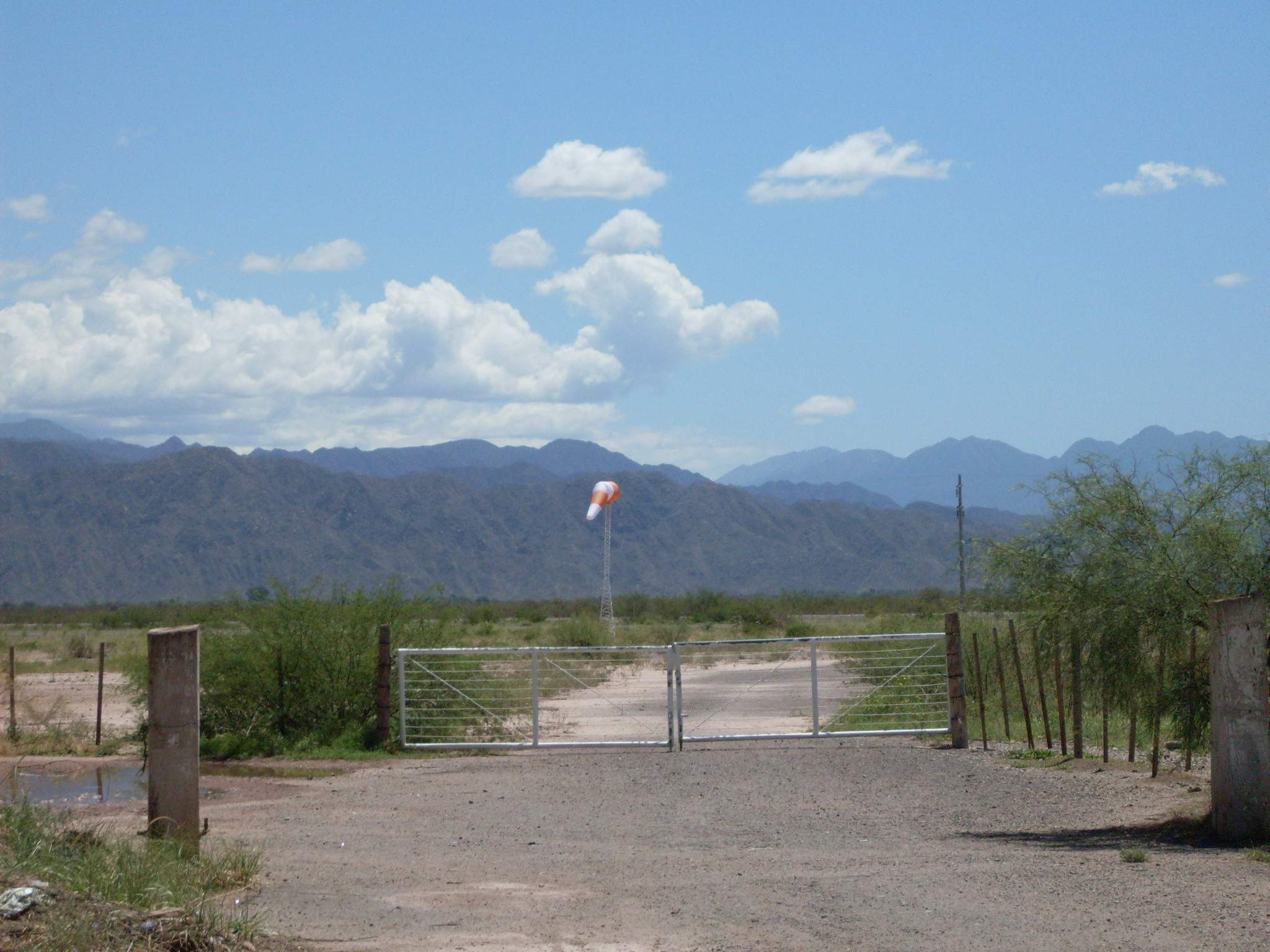

Tinogasta Airport (Spanish: Aeropuerto de Tinogasta, ICAO: SANI) was a public airport located 3 kilometres (2 mi) north-northwest of Tinogasta, a town in the Catamarca Province of Argentina.

Google Earth Historical Imagery (10/24/2013) and current Google Maps show the runway is closed.

== See also ==
- Transport in Argentina
- List of airports in Argentina
