= Santa Cruz Airport (Argentina) =

- IATA: RZA; ICAO: SAWU

Summary
- Airport type: Public
- Serves: Puerto Santa Cruz, Argentina
- Elevation AMSL: 364 ft / 111 m
- Coordinates: 50°01′00″S 68°34′45″W

Map
- Location in Argentina

Runways
Direction	Length		Surface
Direction	m	ft	Surface
07/25	2,000	6,562	Asphalt
- Sources: World Aero Data Google Maps SkyVector

Santa Cruz Airport (IATA: RZA, ICAO: SAWU) is an airport serving Puerto Santa Cruz, a town on the Santa Cruz River estuary in the Santa Cruz Province of Argentina. The airport is 3 kilometres (2 mi) inland from the town.

There are deep ravines less than 500 metres (1,600 ft) off each end of the runway. The Santa Cruz non-directional beacon (Ident: SCZ) is located on the field.

== See also ==
- Transport in Argentina
- List of airports in Argentina
