= Olavarría Airport =

Airport in Argentina

- IATA: OVR; ICAO: SAZF

Summary
- Airport type: Public
- Serves: Olavarría, Argentina
- Elevation AMSL: 551 ft (168 m)
- Coordinates: 36°53′25″S 60°13′00″W

Map
- Location in Argentina

Runways
Direction	Length		Surface
Direction	m	ft	Surface
04/22	2,198	7,211	Asphalt
13/31	950	3,117	Grass
- Source: WAD Google Maps SkyVector

Olavarría Airport (IATA: OVR, ICAO: SAZF) is an airport serving Olavarría, a city in the Buenos Aires Province of Argentina. The airport is in the countryside 7 kilometres (4 mi) east of the city.

The Olavarria non-directional beacon (Ident: OLA) is located on the field.

== Airlines and destinations ==
Airlines	Destinations
Humming Airways	Buenos Aires–Aeroparque

== See also ==
- Transport in Argentina
- List of airports in Argentina
