= Jáchal Airport =

Airport in Argentina

Jáchal Airport Aeropuerto de Jáchal
- IATA: none; ICAO: SAMJ

Summary
- Airport type: Closed
- Serves: San José de Jáchal, Argentina
- Elevation AMSL: 3,822 ft / 1,165 m
- Coordinates: 30°14′53″S 68°45′55″W

Map
- Location of airport in Argentina

Runways
Direction	Length		Surface
Direction	ft	m	Surface
Closed
- Source: Landings.com Google Maps

Jáchal Airport (Spanish: Aeropuerto de Jáchal, ICAO: SAMJ) was a public use airstrip located 2 kilometres (1 mi) west of San José de Jáchal, San Juan, Argentina.

Google Maps shows the former runway covered with scrub and brush, with washed out areas.

== See also ==
- Transport in Argentina
- List of airports in Argentina
