= La Quiaca Airport =

Airport in Argentina

La Quiaca Airport Aeropuerto La Quiaca
- IATA: none; ICAO: SASQ

Summary
- Airport type: Public
- Serves: La Quiaca, Argentina
- Elevation AMSL: 11,414 ft / 3,479 m
- Coordinates: 22°09′45″S 65°34′19″W

Map
- Location of La Quiaca Airport in Argentina

Runways
Direction	Length		Surface
Direction	m	ft	Surface
16/34	2,700	8,858	Asphalt
- Source: Landings.com Google Maps SkyVector

La Quiaca Airport (Spanish: Aeropuerto La Quiaca, ICAO: SASQ) is a very high elevation airport serving La Quiaca, a town in the Jujuy Province of Argentina. La Quiaca is on the border with Bolivia, across from the Bolivian town of Villazon.

The runway is 5 kilometres (3 mi) south-southeast of La Quiaca, and has an unpaved 585 metres (1,919 ft) overrun on the south end.

The Tarija VOR-DME (Ident: TAR) is located 60.3 nautical miles (112 km) northeast of the airport.

== See also ==
- Transport in Argentina
- List of airports in Argentina
