= Nueve de Julio Airport =

Airport in Argentina

- IATA: none; ICAO: SAZX

Summary
- Airport type: Public
- Serves: Nueve de Julio, Argentina
- Elevation AMSL: 242 ft / 74 m
- Coordinates: 35°23′55″S 60°56′15″W

Map
- Location of airport in Argentina

Runways
Direction	Length		Surface
Direction	m	ft	Surface
13/31	1,220	4,003	Grass
18/36	950	3,117	Grass
- Source: Landings.com Google Maps GCM

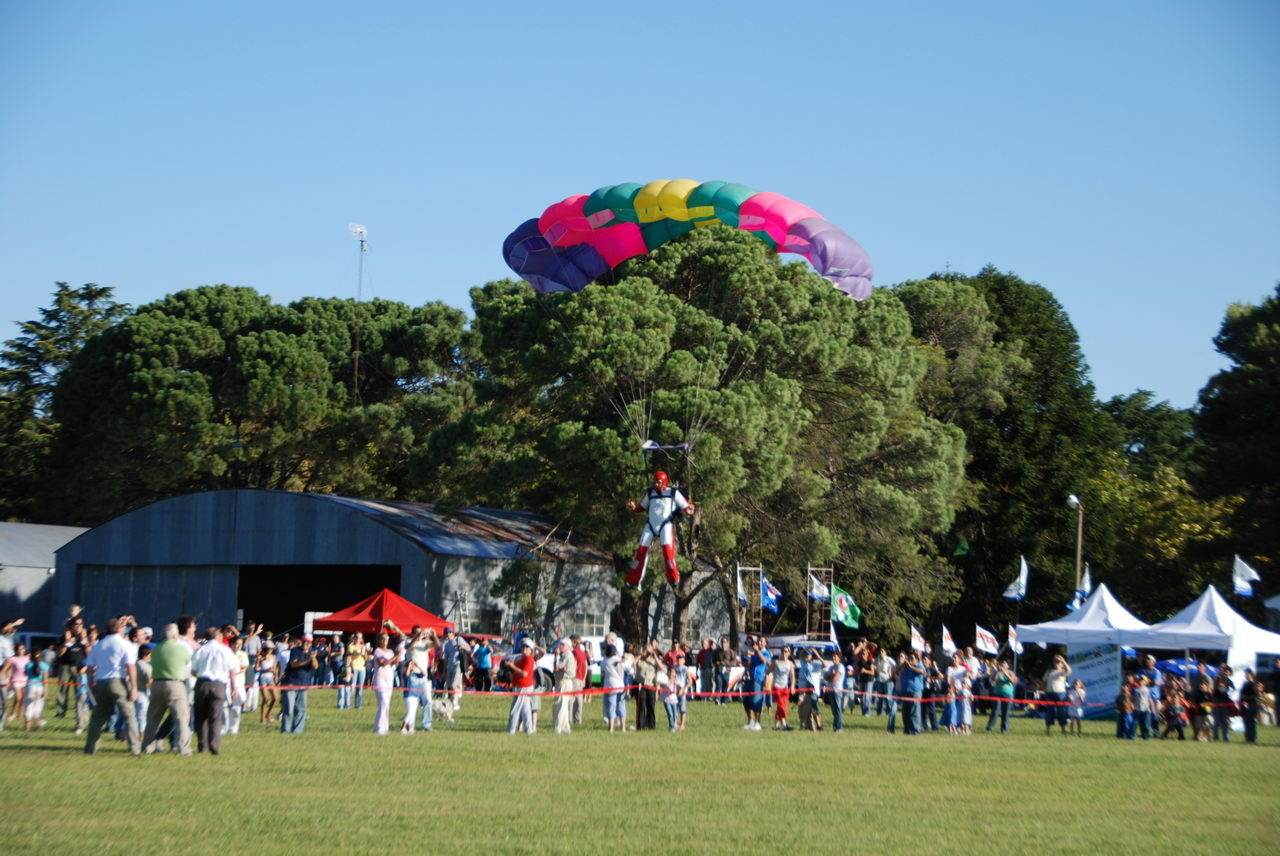
A festival taking place at Nuevo De Julio airport.

Nueve de Julio Airport (ICAO: SAZX) is a public use airport serving Nueve de Julio, a town in the Buenos Aires Province of Argentina. The airport is in the countryside 6 kilometres (4 mi) northwest of the town.

The Junin VOR (Ident: NIN) is located 51.6 nautical miles (96 km) north of the airport.

== See also ==
- Transport in Argentina
- List of airports in Argentina
