= General Alvear Airport =

Airport in Argentina

- IATA: none; ICAO: SAMA

Summary
- Airport type: Closed
- Serves: General Alvear, Argentina
- Elevation AMSL: 1,489 ft / 454 m
- Coordinates: 35°03′34″S 67°41′35″W

Map
- Location of airport in Argentina

Runways
| Direction | Length | | Surface |
| Direction | m | ft | Surface |
|---|---|---|---|
Closed
- Source: Landings.com Google Maps

General Alvear Airport (ICAO: SAMA) was a public use airport located 8 kilometres (5 mi) south of General Alvear, a city in the Mendoza Province of Argentina.

Aerial imagery of the airport shows the runway is marked closed. Google Earth Historical Imagery (6/6/2016), (12/10/2018) shows the runway was closed sometime after June 2016.

== See also ==
- Transport in Argentina
- List of airports in Argentina
