= Monte Caseros Airport =

Airport in Argentina

- IATA: MCS; ICAO: SARM

Summary
- Airport type: Public
- Location: Monte Caseros
- Elevation AMSL: 170 ft / 52 m
- Coordinates: 30°16′20″S 57°38′21″W

Map
- Location in Argentina

Runways
Direction	Length		Surface
Direction	m	ft	Surface
18/36	1,318	4,324	Grass
- Sources: WAD Google Maps SkyVector

Monte Caseros Airport (IATA: MCS, ICAO: SARM) is an airport serving Monte Caseros, a town in the Corrientes Province of Argentina. Monte Caseros is 8 kilometres (5.0 mi) south of the triple border between Argentina, Brazil, and Uruguay.

The runway is just south of the town and 1 kilometre (0.6 mi) west of the Uruguay River, which is the international border between Argentina and Uruguay. An asphalt parallel runway just west of the grass runway is marked closed.

The Monte Caseros VOR-DME (Ident: MCS) is located on the field.

== See also ==
- Transport in Argentina
- List of airports in Argentina
