= Alto Río Senguer Airport =

Airport in Chubut, Argentina

- IATA: ARR; ICAO: SAVR

Summary
- Airport type: Public
- Serves: Alto Río Senguer
- Location: Argentina
- Elevation AMSL: 2,287 ft / 697 m
- Coordinates: 45°0′48.4″S 70°48′46.3″W

Map
- Location of Alto Río Senguer Airport in Argentina

Runways
Direction	Length		Surface
Direction	m	ft	Surface
08/26	1,539	5,050	GRASS
- Source: Landings.com

Alto Río Senguer Airport (IATA: ARR, ICAO: SAVR) is a public use airport serving the town of Alto Río Senguer, Chubut, Argentina.

== See also ==
- List of airports in Argentina
