= Brigadier Hector Eduardo Ruiz Airport =

Brigadier Hector Eduardo Ruiz Airport Aeropuerto Brigadier Hector Eduardo Ruiz
- IATA: CSZ; ICAO: SAZC

Summary
- Airport type: Public
- Serves: Coronel Suárez
- Location: Argentina
- Elevation AMSL: 768 ft / 234 m
- Coordinates: 37°26′46.2″S 061°53′21.6″W

Map
- Location of Brigadier Hector Eduardo Ruiz Airport in Argentina

Runways
Direction	Length		Surface
Direction	ft	m	Surface
17/35	4,400	1,341	Asphalt
18/36	4,960	1,512	Grass
- Source: Landings.com

Brigadier Hector Eduardo Ruiz Airport (Spanish: Aeropuerto Brigadier Hector Eduardo Ruiz, IATA: CSZ, ICAO: SAZC) is a public use airport located 4 kilometres (2 mi) east-northeast of Coronel Suárez, Buenos Aires, Argentina.

== See also ==
- List of airports in Argentina
