= Mariano Moreno Airport =

Airport in Argentina

Maríano Moreno Airport Aeropuerto de Maríano Moreno
- IATA: none; ICAO: SADJ

Summary
- Airport type: Public/Military
- Serves: José C. Paz, Argentina
- Elevation AMSL: 105 ft / 32 m
- Coordinates: 34°33′30″S 58°47′25″W

Map
- Location of airport in Argentina

Runways
| Direction | Length | | Surface |
| Direction | m | ft | Surface |
|---|---|---|---|
| 16/34 | 2,408 | 7,900 | Asphalt |
- Source: Landings.com Google Maps SkyVector

Maríano Moreno Airport (Spanish: Aeropuerto de Maríano Moreno, ICAO: SADJ) is a joint public/military airport located south of José C. Paz, a western suburb in the Greater Buenos Aires metropolitan region of Argentina. The airport is named after Argentinian patriot Mariano Moreno.

The Mariano Moreno VOR-DME (Ident: ENO) is located on the field. The Mariano Moreno non-directional beacon (Ident: Z1) is just north of the airport.

== See also ==
- Transport in Argentina
- List of airports in Argentina
