= Cerro Catedral Heliport =

- IATA: none; ICAO: SAZK

Summary
- Airport type: Public
- Serves: Cerro Catedral
- Location: Argentina
- Elevation AMSL: 3,450 ft / 1,052 m
- Coordinates: 41°9′51.8″S 71°26′25.0″W

Map
- Location of Cerro Catedral Heliport in Argentina

Helipads
Number	Length		Surface
Number	m	ft	Surface
1	22	72	ASPHALT
- Source: Landings.com

Cerro Catedral Heliport (ICAO: SAZK) is a public-use heliport located near Cerro Catedral, Río Negro Province, Argentina.

== See also ==
- List of airports in Argentina
