= Río Colorado Airport =

Airport in Argentina

Río Colorado Airport Aeropuerto Río Colorado
- IATA: none; ICAO: SAZQ

Summary
- Airport type: Public
- Serves: Río Colorado, Argentina
- Elevation AMSL: 275 ft / 84 m
- Coordinates: 38°59′42″S 64°08′25″W

Map
- Location of airport in Argentina

Runways
Direction	Length		Surface
Direction	m	ft	Surface
05/23	1,335	4,380	Grass
- Source: Landings.com Google Maps GCM

Río Colorado Airport (Spanish: Aeropuerto Río Colorado, ICAO: SAZQ) is a public use airport 3 kilometres (2 mi) west of Río Colorado, a town in the Río Negro Province of Argentina.

== See also ==
- Transport in Argentina
- List of airports in Argentina
