= Oberá Airport =

Airport in Argentina

Oberá Airport Aeropuerto de Oberá
- IATA: none; ICAO: SATO

Summary
- Airport type: Public
- Serves: Oberá
- Location: Argentina
- Elevation AMSL: 1,125 ft / 343 m
- Coordinates: 27°31′05″S 55°7′27″W

Map
- Location of airport in Argentina

Runways
Direction	Length		Surface
Direction	m	ft	Surface
17/35	1,800	5,906	Asphalt
- Source: Landings.com Google Maps GCM

Oberá Airport (Spanish: Aeropuerto de Oberá, ICAO: SATO) is a public use airport serving Oberá, a city in the Misiones Province of Argentina. The airport is at the south edge of the city.

The Posadas VOR-DME (Ident: POS) is located 45.7 nautical miles (85 km) west of the airport.

== See also ==
- Transport in Argentina
- List of airports in Argentina
