= Campo de Mayo Airport =

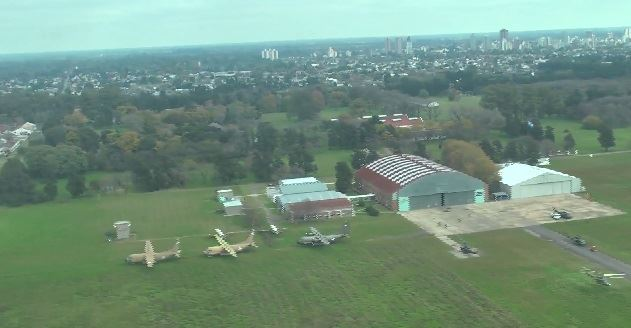
- IATA: none; ICAO: SADO

Summary
- Airport type: Military
- Serves: San Miguel, Argentina
- Elevation AMSL: 78 ft (24 m)
- Coordinates: 34°32′05″S 58°40′20″W

Map
- Location of airport in Argentina

Runways
Direction	Length		Surface
Direction	m	ft	Surface
18/36	1,759	5,771	Asphalt

Helipads
Number	Length		Surface
Number	m	ft	Surface
1	17	56	Asphalt
- Source: Landings.com Google Maps GCM

Campo de Mayo Airport (ICAO: SADO) is a military airport located near San Miguel, Buenos Aires, Argentina.

The airport is within a 36 square kilometres (14 mi^{2}) military reservation surrounded by urban areas in the northwest suburbs of Buenos Aires. Approach and departure will be over densely populated areas. Runway length includes 65 metres (213 ft) paved overruns on both ends.

The El Palomar VOR-DME (Ident: PAL) is located 5.5 nautical miles (10 km) south-southeast of the airport. The El Palomar non-directional beacon (Ident: L) is located 4.0 nautical miles (7 km) to the southeast. The Mariano Moreno VOR-DME (Ident: ENO) is located 6.1 nautical miles (11 km) west-southwest of Campo de Mayo.

== See also ==
- Transport in Argentina
- List of airports in Argentina
