= Chos Malal Airport =

Chos Malal Airport Aeropuerto de Chos Malal
- IATA: HOS; ICAO: SAHC

Summary
- Airport type: Public
- Serves: Chos Malal
- Location: Argentina
- Elevation AMSL: 2,789 ft (850 m)
- Coordinates: 37°26′40.8″S 070°13′20.1″W

Map
- Location of Chos Malal Airport in Argentina

Runways
Direction	Length		Surface
Direction	ft	m	Surface
12/30	4,950	1,509	Asphalt
- Source: Landings.com

Chos Malal Airport (Spanish: Aeropuerto de Chos Malal, IATA: HOS, ICAO: SAHC) is a public use airport located 9 kilometres (6 mi) south-southeast of Chos Malal, Neuquén, Argentina.

== Airlines and destinations ==
Airlines	Destinations
American Jet	Neuquén

== See also ==
- List of airports in Argentina
