= Escuela de Aviación Militar Airport =

Airport in Argentina

- IATA: ESC; ICAO: SACE

Summary
- Airport type: Military
- Serves: Córdoba
- Location: Argentina
- Elevation AMSL: 1,647 ft / 502 m
- Coordinates: 31°26′41.0″S 64°17′0.7″W

Map
- Location of Escuela de Aviación Militar Airport in Argentina

Runways
Direction	Length		Surface
Direction	m	ft	Surface
01/19	1,884	6,180	ASPHALT
07/25	1,823	5,980	DIRT
- Source: Landings.com

Escuela de Aviación Militar Airport (ICAO: SACE) is a military airport located 6 nm west-southwest of Córdoba, Córdoba, Argentina.

== See also ==
- List of airports in Argentina
