= San Carlos Airport (Mendoza) =

Airport in Argentina

- IATA: none; ICAO: SAMS

Summary
- Airport type: Public
- Serves: San Carlos, Argentina
- Elevation AMSL: 3,084 ft / 940 m
- Coordinates: 33°46′51″S 69°04′06″W

Map
- Location of airport in Argentina

Runways
Direction	Length		Surface
Direction	m	ft	Surface
17/35	650	2,133	Grass
- Source: Landings.com Google Maps

San Carlos Airport (ICAO: SAMS) is a public use airport located 2 kilometres (1 mi) west-southwest of San Carlos, Mendoza, Argentina. Its runway is not marked.

== See also ==
- Transport in Argentina
- List of airports in Argentina
