= Chilecito Airport =

Chilecito Airport Aeropuerto de Chilecito
- IATA: none; ICAO: SANO

Summary
- Airport type: Public
- Serves: Chilecito
- Location: Argentina
- Elevation AMSL: 3,117 ft / 950 m
- Coordinates: 29°13′27.2″S 067°26′22.0″W

Map
- Location of Chilecito Airport in Argentina

Runways
Direction	Length		Surface
Direction	ft	m	Surface
17/35	6,890	2,100	Asphalt
- Source: Landings.com

Chilecito Airport (Spanish: Aeropuerto de Chilecito, ICAO: SANO) is a public use airport located 9 kilometres (6 mi) southeast of Chilecito, La Rioja, Argentina.

== See also ==
- List of airports in Argentina
