= Río Mayo Airport =

Airport in Argentina

- IATA: ROY; ICAO: SAWM

Summary
- Airport type: Public
- Serves: Río Mayo
- Location: Argentina
- Elevation AMSL: 1,788 ft / 545 m
- Coordinates: 45°42′15″S 70°14′35″W

Map
- Location of airport in Argentina

Runways
Direction	Length		Surface
Direction	m	ft	Surface
09/27	2,070	6,791	Dirt
05/23	1,800	5,906	Dirt
- Source: Landings.com Google Maps GCM

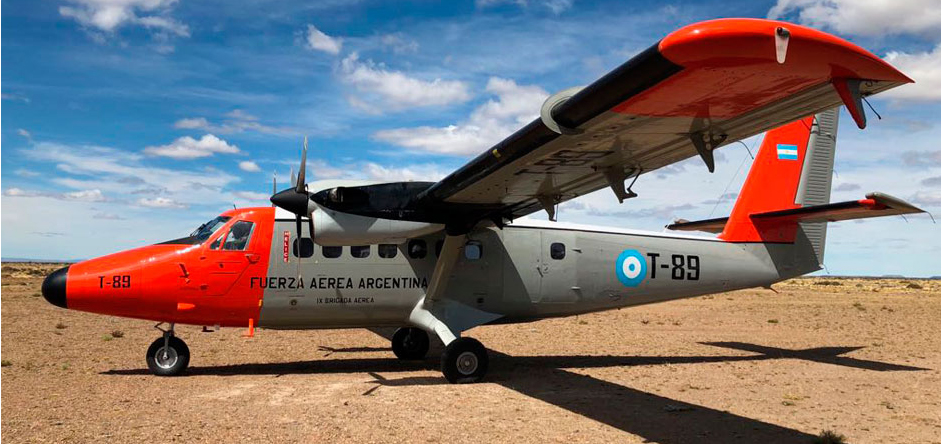
A DHC-6 Twin Otter at the airport Río Mayo

Río Mayo Airport (IATA: ROY, ICAO: SAWM) is a public use airport 1 kilometre (0.6 mi) south of Río Mayo, Chubut, Argentina.

The Rio Mayo non-directional beacon (Ident: RMY) is located on the field.

== See also ==
- Transport in Argentina
- List of airports in Argentina
