= Villa General Mitre Airport =

Airport in Argentina

Villa General Mitre Airport Aeropuerto de Villa General Mitre
- IATA: none; ICAO: SACM; LID: VGM

Summary
- Airport type: Closed
- Location: Villa del Totoral, Argentina
- Elevation AMSL: 1,760 ft / 536 m
- Coordinates: 30°41′59″S 64°02′20″W

Map
- Location of the airport in Argentina

Runways
Direction	Length		Surface
Direction	ft	m	Surface
Closed
- Source: Landings.com Google Maps

Villa General Mitre Airport (Spanish: Aeropuerto de Villa General Mitre, (ICAO: SACM)) was an airstrip 3 kilometres (2 mi) east of Villa del Totoral, a town in the Córdoba Province of Argentina.

Google Earth Historical Imagery (1/7/2002) shows the partial remains of a 1,350 metres (4,430 ft) grass runway. The (10/17/2010) image and current Google Maps show the land under cultivation.

== See also ==
- Transport in Argentina
- List of airports in Argentina
