= Resistencia Aeroclub =

Airport in Argentina

Resistencia Aeroclub Airport Aeroclub Chaco Airport
- IATA: none; ICAO: SARR

Summary
- Airport type: Public
- Serves: Resistencia, Argentina
- Elevation AMSL: 171 ft (52 m)
- Coordinates: 27°37′55″S 59°10′48″W

Map
- Location of airport in Argentina

Runways
| Direction | Length | | Surface |
| Direction | m | ft | Surface |
|---|---|---|---|
| 03/21 | 1,100 | 3,609 | Grass |
- Source: Landings.com Google Maps FallingRain

Resistencia Aeroclub Airport (ICAO: SARR) is a rural airport 25 kilometres (16 mi) southwest of Resistencia, a city in the Chaco Province of Argentina.

The Resistencia VOR-DME (Ident: SIS) is located 12.8 nautical miles (24 km) north-northeast of the airport. The Resistencia non-directional beacon (Ident: SIS) is located 11.6 nautical miles (21 km) north-northeast of Aeroclub Airport.

== See also ==
- Transport in Argentina
- List of airports in Argentina
