= Ceres Airport =

Airport in Argentina

- IATA: CRR; ICAO: SANW

Summary
- Airport type: Public
- Serves: Ceres
- Location: Argentina
- Elevation AMSL: 289 ft / 88 m
- Coordinates: 29°52′18.8″S 61°55′37.3″W

Map
- Location of Ceres Airport in Argentina

Runways
Direction	Length		Surface
Direction	m	ft	Surface
06/24	1,478	4,850	GRASS
- Source: Landings.com

Ceres Airport (IATA: CRR, ICAO: SANW) is a public use airport located 1 nm east-northeast of Ceres, Santa Fe, Argentina.

== See also ==
- List of airports in Argentina
