= Rafaela Aerodrome =

Airport in Argentina

Rafaela Aerodrome Aeródromo de Rafaela
- IATA: RAF; ICAO: SAFR

Summary
- Airport type: Public
- Operator: Municipality of Rafaela
- Serves: Rafaela, Argentina
- Elevation AMSL: 361 ft / 110 m
- Coordinates: 31°17′00″S 61°30′20″W

Map
- Location of the airport in Argentina

Runways
Direction	Length		Surface
Direction	m	ft	Surface
01R/19L	1,380	4,528	Concrete
01L/19R	1,107	3,632	Grass
06/24	1,100	3,609	Grass
- Source: WAD Falling Rain Google Maps

Rafaela Aerodrome (Spanish: Aeródromo de Rafaela) (IATA: RAF, ICAO: SAFR) is an airport serving Rafaela, a city in the Santa Fe Province of Argentina. The airport is on the south side of the city.

It features a small passenger terminal, due to be rebuilt or upgraded, and three runways. Daily traffic consists of one or two small commercial flights.

It is one of the few airports in Argentina that comprises two parallel runways.

== See also ==
- Transport in Argentina
- List of airports in Argentina
