= Quilmes Airport =

Airport in Argentina

Quilmes Airport Aeropuerto de Quilmes
- IATA: none; ICAO: SADQ

Summary
- Airport type: Public
- Serves: Quilmes, Argentina
- Elevation AMSL: 6 ft / 2 m
- Coordinates: 34°42′25″S 58°14′40″W

Map
- Location of airport in Argentina

Runways
Direction	Length		Surface
Direction	m	ft	Surface
18/36	1,010	3,314	Grass
- Source: Landings.com Google Maps GCM

Quilmes Airport (Spanish: Aeropuerto de Quilmes, ICAO: SADQ) is a public use airport serving Quilmes, a southeastern suburb of Buenos Aires, Argentina.

The airport is in the shoreline green band between Quilmes and the Río de la Plata estuary. North approach and departure are over the water.

The Ezeiza VOR-DME (Ident: EZE) is located 16.0 nautical miles (30 km) west-southwest of the airport. The Quilmes non-directional beacon (Ident: ILM) is located on the field.

== See also ==
- Transport in Argentina
- List of airports in Argentina
