= Goya Airport =

Airport in Argentina

- IATA: OYA; ICAO: SATG

Summary
- Airport type: Public
- Serves: Goya, Argentina
- Elevation AMSL: 128 ft / 39 m
- Coordinates: 29°06′25″S 59°13′10″W

Map
- Location of the airport in Argentina

Runways
| Direction | Length | | Surface |
| Direction | m | ft | Surface |
|---|---|---|---|
| 04/22 | 1,700 | 5,577 | Asphalt |
- Sources: WAD Google Maps SkyVector

Goya Airport (IATA: OYA, ICAO: SATG) is an airport serving Goya, a town on the Paraná River in Corrientes Province, Argentina. The airport is 4 kilometres (2 mi) northeast of the town.

North approach and departure cross over the Santa Lucía River. Runway length does not include blast pads of approximately 280 metres (920 ft) on each end of its paved surface.

The Reconquista VOR-DME (Ident: RTA) is located 25.1 nautical miles (46 km) west-southwest of the airport. The Goya non-directional beacon (Ident: G1) is located on the field.

== See also ==
- Transport in Argentina
- List of airports in Argentina
