= Santa Teresita Airport =

Airport in Argentina

- IATA: SST; ICAO: SAZL

Summary
- Airport type: Public
- Serves: Santa Teresita, Argentina
- Elevation AMSL: 10 ft / 3 m
- Coordinates: 36°32′30″S 56°43′18″W

Map
- Location of the airport in Argentina

Runways
| Direction | Length | | Surface |
| Direction | m | ft | Surface |
|---|---|---|---|
| 17/35 | 1,500 | 4,921 | Asphalt |
- Sources: ORSNA WAD SkyVector Google Maps

Santa Teresita Airport (IATA: SST, ICAO: SAZL) is an airport serving Santa Teresita, an Atlantic coastal town in the Buenos Aires Province of Argentina. The airport covers an area of 306 hectares (760 acres), and has a 250-square-metre (2,700 sq ft) terminal. It parallels the coastline, 1 kilometre (0.6 mi) inland from the town.

The Santa Teresita non-directional beacon (Ident: STR) is located on the field.

== See also ==
- Transport in Argentina
- List of airports in Argentina
