= La Cumbre Airport =

Airport in Argentina

La Cumbre Airport Aeropuerto La Cumbre
- IATA: LCM; ICAO: SACC

Summary
- Airport type: Public
- Serves: La Cumbre, Argentina
- Elevation AMSL: 3,734 ft / 1,138 m
- Coordinates: 31°00′20″S 64°31′55″W

Map
- Location of airport in Argentina

Runways
Direction	Length		Surface
Direction	m	ft	Surface
14/32	1,278	4,193	Grass

Helipads
Number	Length		Surface
Number	m	ft	Surface
1	38	125	Asphalt
- Source: Landings.com Google Maps GCM

La Cumbre Airport (Spanish: Aeropuerto La Cumbre, IATA: LCM, ICAO: SACC) is a public use airport serving La Cumbre, a town in the Córdoba Province of Argentina. The airport is in the countryside 4 kilometres (2 mi) southwest of the town.

The Cordoba VOR-DME (Ident: CBA) is located 25.0 nautical miles (46 km) southeast of the airport.

== See also ==
- Transport in Argentina
- List of airports in Argentina
