= San Antonio de Areco Airport =

Airport in Argentina

San Antonio de Areco Airport Aerodromo Provincial Aeroclub San Antonio de Areco
- IATA: none; ICAO: SAAA; LID: SNT

Summary
- Airport type: Public
- Serves: San Antonio de Areco, Argentina
- Elevation AMSL: 98 ft / 30 m
- Coordinates: 34°13′16″S 59°26′30″W

Map
- Location of airport in Argentina

Runways
Direction	Length		Surface
Direction	m	ft	Surface
07/25	595	1,952	Grass
- Source: GCM Google Maps

San Antonio de Areco Airport (Spanish: Aerodromo Provincial Aeroclub San Antonio de Areco, ICAO: SAAA) is an airport 3 kilometres (2 mi) northeast of San Antonio de Areco, a town in the Buenos Aires Province of Argentina.

The San Antonio De Areco non-directional beacon (Ident: SNT) is located 2.3 nautical miles (4 km) southwest of the airport. The San Antonio De Areco VOR-DME (Ident: SNT) is located on the field.

== See also ==
- Transport in Argentina
- List of airports in Argentina
