= Los Menucos Airport =

Airport in Argentina

- IATA: LMD; ICAO: none

Summary
- Airport type: Public
- Serves: Los Menucos, Argentina
- Elevation AMSL: 2,571 ft / 784 m
- Coordinates: 40°49′00″S 68°04′25″W

Map
- Location of the airport in Argentina

Runways
Direction	Length		Surface
Direction	m	ft	Surface
09/27	1,630	5,348	Asphalt/gravel
- Source: GCM Google Maps

Los Menucos Airport (IATA: LMD) is an airport serving the town of Los Menucos in the Río Negro Province of Argentina. The airport is 3 kilometres (2 mi) north of Los Menucos.

The runway has 1630 meters graded, with the central 1,200 metres (3,900 ft) asphalt paved.

== See also ==
- Transport in Argentina
- List of airports in Argentina
