= Ciudad de Mendoza Airpark =

Mendoza Airpark Base Condor
- IATA: none; ICAO: SAMQ; LID: MAE

Summary
- Airport type: Military
- Owner: Mendoza Province Ministry of Security
- Serves: Mendoza, Argentina
- Elevation AMSL: 2,648 ft / 807 m
- Coordinates: 32°51′55″S 68°52′18″W

Map
- Location of airport in Argentina

Runways
Direction	Length		Surface
Direction	m	ft	Surface
18/36	1,700	5,577	Asphalt

Helipads
Number	Length		Surface
Number	m	ft	Surface
1	25	82	Asphalt
- Source: Landings.com Google Maps SkyVector

Mendoza Airpark (Spanish: Base Condor, ICAO: SAMQ) is an airport serving Mendoza, capital of Mendoza Province, Argentina. The airport is on the northwest side of the city.

The Mendoza Province Ministry of Security operates the airport as Base Condor, with a unit of police helicopters on the base.

There is high terrain northwest of the airport. The Mendoza VOR-DME (Ident: DOZ) is located 4.5 nautical miles (8 km) northeast of the airport.

== See also ==
- Transport in Argentina
- List of airports in Argentina
