= Comodoro P. Zanni Airport =

Airport in Argentina

Comodoro Pedro Zanni Airport
- IATA: PEH; ICAO: SAZP

Summary
- Airport type: Public
- Serves: Pehuajó, Argentina
- Elevation AMSL: 278 ft / 85 m
- Coordinates: 35°50′45″S 61°51′27″W

Map
- Location of the airport in Argentina

Runways
Direction	Length		Surface
Direction	m	ft	Surface
18/36	1,500	4,921	Asphalt
- Sources: WAD Google Maps SkyVector

Comodoro Pedro Zanni Airport (IATA: PEH, ICAO: SAZP), also known as Pehuajó Airport, is an airport serving Pehuajó, a city in the Buenos Aires Province of Argentina. The airport is 5 kilometres (3 mi) southeast of the city.

The Pehuajo non-directional beacon (Ident: PEH) is located on the field.

== See also ==
- Transport in Argentina
- List of airports in Argentina
