= Eldorado Airport (Argentina) =

Airport in Argentina

Eldorado Airport Aeropuerto Eldorado
- IATA: ELO; ICAO: SATD

Summary
- Airport type: Public
- Serves: Eldorado
- Location: Argentina
- Elevation AMSL: 689 ft / 210 m
- Coordinates: 26°23′51.9″S 054°34′29.0″W

Map
- Location of Eldorado Airport in Argentina

Runways
Direction	Length		Surface
Direction	ft	m	Surface
01/19	4,710	1,436	Asphalt
- Source: Landings.com

Eldorado Airport (Spanish: Aeropuerto Eldorado, IATA: ELO, ICAO: SATD) is a public use airport located 5 kilometres (3 mi) east of Eldorado, Misiones, Argentina.

== See also ==
- List of airports in Argentina
