= Loncopué Airport =

Airport in Argentina

Loncopué Airport Aeropuerto Teniente La Rufa
- IATA: LCP; ICAO: SA18

Summary
- Airport type: Public
- Serves: Loncopué, Argentina
- Elevation AMSL: 3,627 ft / 1,106 m
- Coordinates: 38°04′55″S 70°38′35″W

Map
- Location of the airport in Argentina

Runways
Direction	Length		Surface
Direction	m	ft	Surface
09/27	1,600	5,249	Asphalt
- Source: GCM Google Maps

Loncopué Aeroclub Airport (IATA: LCP, ICAO: SA18) is an airport serving the town of Loncopué in the Neuquén Province of Argentina. The airport is 2 kilometres (1.2 mi) southwest of the town.

There is a shallow ravine south alongside the runway.

== See also ==
- Transport in Argentina
- List of airports in Argentina
