= Punta de Vacas Heliport =

Airport in Argentina

- IATA: none; ICAO: SAML

Summary
- Airport type: Public
- Serves: Punta de Vacas, Argentina
- Elevation AMSL: 7,906 ft / 2,410 m
- Coordinates: 32°51′03″S 69°45′26″W

Map
- Location of heliport in Argentina

Helipads
Number	Length		Surface
Number	m	ft	Surface
1	12	39	Asphalt
- Source: Landings.com Google Maps Falling Rain

Punta de Vacas Heliport (ICAO: SAML) is a high elevation heliport at Punta de Vacas, a hamlet in the Mendoza Province of Argentina. Punta de Vacas is on the National Route 7 highway in the narrow mountain valley of the Mendoza River.

There is close mountainous terrain in all quadrants. The Mendoza VOR-DME (Ident: DOZ) is located 48.9 nautical miles (91 km) east of the heliport.

== See also ==
- Transport in Argentina
- List of airports in Argentina
