= Tolhuin Lago Fagnano Airport =

Airport in Argentina

Tolhuin Lago Fagnano Airport Tolwin Observatory Airport
- IATA: none; ICAO: SAWL

Summary
- Airport type: Public
- Serves: Tolhuin, Argentina
- Elevation AMSL: 90 ft / 27 m
- Coordinates: 54°29′59″S 67°10′20″W

Map
- Location of airport in Argentina

Runways
Direction	Length		Surface
Direction	m	ft	Surface
07/25	1,152	3,780	Asphalt
- Source: Landings.com Google Maps

Tolhuin Lago Fagnano Airport (Spanish: Aeropuerto de Tolhuin Lago Fagnano, ICAO: SAWL) is a public use airport located 2 kilometres (1 mi) northeast of Tolhuin, a lakeside village in the Tierra del Fuego Province of Argentina.

The Puerto Williams VOR-DME (Ident: PWL) is located 28.5 nautical miles (53 km) south-southwest of the airport. The Ushuaia VOR (Ident: USU) is located 42.2 nautical miles (78 km) west-southwest of the airport.

== See also ==
- Transport in Argentina
- List of airports in Argentina
