= Villa Reynolds Airport =

Airport in Argentina

Villa Reynolds Airport Aeropuerto de Villa Reynolds
- IATA: VME; ICAO: SAOR

Summary
- Airport type: Military/Public
- Operator: Aeropuertos Argentina 2000
- Serves: Villa Mercedes, Argentina
- Location: Villa Reynolds
- Elevation AMSL: 1,591 ft (485 m)
- Coordinates: 33°43′30″S 65°22′40″W

Map
- Location of the Airport in Argentina

Runways
Direction	Length		Surface
Direction	m	ft	Surface
06/24	2,360	7,743	Asphalt
- Sources: ORSNA, WAD Google Maps

Villa Reynolds Airport (Spanish: Aeropuerto de Villa Reynolds) (IATA: RYD, ICAO: SAOR) is a joint military/general aviation airport serving Villa Mercedes, a city in the San Luis Province of Argentina. It is 8 km (5 miles) southeast of Villa Mercedes, adjacent to Villa Reynolds, a village serving the Argentine Air Force base.

The airport covers an area of 80 hectares (200 acres), and has a 1,000-square-metre (11,000 sq ft) terminal. Runway 10/28 is closed. The Villa Reynolds VOR-DME (Ident: RYD) and non-directional beacon (Ident: RYD) are located on the field.

On 14 May 2026 the Argentine Air Force announced the retirement of their Douglas A-4 Skyhawk attack jets based at Villa Reynolds Air Base as part of the 5th Air Brigade (V Brigada Aérea).

The airbase also hosts the Museum of the V Air Brigade (Spanish: Museo V Brigada Aérea); a collection of material related to the base unit, including the cockpit section of an Douglas A-4AR Fighting Hawk, and one of only four complete Avro Lincoln heavy bombers.

== Airlines and destinations ==
Airlines	Destinations
LADE	Buenos Aires–Aeroparque, Merlo

== Accidents and incidents ==
- 7 August 1971: An Argentine Air Force Douglas C-47A, tail number TC-31, experienced an engine fire during takeoff. The aircraft was written off, but there were no fatalities.

== See also ==
- Transport in Argentina
- List of airports in Argentina
