= Fuerza Aérea (Edificio Cóndor) Heliport =

Airport in Argentina

- IATA: none; ICAO: SABC

Summary
- Airport type: Public
- Serves: Buenos Aires
- Location: Argentina
- Elevation AMSL: 19 ft / 6 m
- Coordinates: 34°35′9.4″S 58°22′5.0″W

Map
- Location of Fuerza Aérea (Edificio Cóndor) Heliport in Argentina

Helipads
Number	Length		Surface
Number	m	ft	Surface
1	18	59	ASPHALT
- Source: Landings.com

Fuerza Aérea (Edificio Cóndor) Heliport (ICAO: SABC) is a public use heliport located in Buenos Aires, Argentina.

== See also ==
- List of airports in Argentina
