= Rivadavia Airport =

Airport in Argentina

Rivadavia Airport Aerodromo Aeroclub Rivadavia
- IATA: none; ICAO: SASR

Summary
- Airport type: Public
- Operator: Aeroclub Rivadavia
- Serves: Rivadavia, Argentina
- Elevation AMSL: 2,162 ft / 659 m
- Coordinates: 33°13′43″S 68°28′26″W

Map
- Location of airport in Argentina

Runways
| Direction | Length | | Surface |
| Direction | m | ft | Surface |
|---|---|---|---|
| 18/36 | 1,235 | 4,052 | Grass |
- Source: Landings.com Google Maps Falling Rain

Rivadavia Airport (Spanish: Aeropuerto de Rivadavia, ICAO: SASR) is a public use airport located 5 kilometres (3 mi) south of Rivadavia, a town in the Mendoza Province of Argentina.

== See also ==
- Transport in Argentina
- List of airports in Argentina
- Talk:Rivadavia Airport
