= Coronel Olmedo Airport =

Airport in Argentina

- IATA: none; ICAO: SACD

Summary
- Airport type: Public
- Serves: Coronel Olmedo
- Location: Argentina
- Elevation AMSL: 1,414 ft / 431 m
- Coordinates: 31°29′16.0″S 64°8′30.4″W

Map
- Location of Coronel Olmedo Airport in Argentina

Runways
Direction	Length		Surface
Direction	m	ft	Surface
05/23	1,256	4,120	GRASS
- Source: Landings.com

Coronel Olmedo Airport (ICAO: SACD) is a public use airport located 1 nm east-southeast of Coronel Olmedo, Córdoba, Argentina.

== See also ==
- List of airports in Argentina
