= El Maitén Airport =

Airport in Argentina

- IATA: EMX; ICAO: SAVD

Summary
- Airport type: Public
- Serves: El Maitén
- Location: Argentina
- Elevation AMSL: 2,362 ft / 720 m
- Coordinates: 42°1′48.5″S 71°10′14.4″W

Map
- Location of El Maitén Airport in Argentina

Runways
Direction	Length		Surface
Direction	m	ft	Surface
05/23	1,554	5,100	GRASS
10/28	1,006	3,300	GRASS
01/19	1,006	3,300	GRASS
- Source: Landings.com

El Maitén Airport (IATA: EMX, ICAO: SAVD) is a public use airport located near El Maitén, Chubut, Argentina.

== See also ==
- List of airports in Argentina
