= General Acha Airport =

Airport in Argentina

General Acha Airport Aeropuerto General Acha
- IATA: none; ICAO: SAEA

Summary
- Airport type: Public
- Serves: General Acha, Argentina
- Elevation AMSL: 925 ft / 282 m
- Coordinates: 37°24′05″S 64°36′45″W

Map
- Location of airport in Argentina

Runways
Direction	Length		Surface
Direction	m	ft	Surface
04/22	1,945	6,381	Asphalt/grass
- Source: Landings.com Google Maps GCM

General Acha Airport (Spanish: Aeropuerto General Acha, ICAO: SAEA) is a public use airport 2 kilometres (1 mi) south of General Acha, a town in the La Pampa Province of Argentina.

The middle 900 metres (3,000 ft) of the runway is asphalt paved, while the rest is grass.

The Santa Rosa VOR-DME (Ident: OSA) is 51.7 nautical miles (96 km) north-northeast of the airport.

== See also ==
- Transport in Argentina
- List of airports in Argentina
