= Dr. Arturo Umberto Illia Airport =

Airport in Argentina

Dr. Arturo Umberto Illia Airport Aeropuerto de Greneral Roca
- IATA: GNR; ICAO: SAHR

Summary
- Airport type: Public
- Operator: Government of Río Negro
- Serves: General Roca, Argentina
- Elevation AMSL: 853 ft / 260 m
- Coordinates: 39°00′00″S 67°37′15″W

Map
- Location of the airport in Argentina

Runways
Direction	Length		Surface
Direction	m	ft	Surface
09/27	2,156	7,073	Asphalt
- Sources: ORSNA, WAD Google Maps

Dr. Arturo Umberto Illia (IATA: GNR, ICAO: SAHR) is an airport serving General Roca, a city in the Río Negro Province of Argentina. The airport is 4 kilometres (2 mi) northwest of the centre of the city. It is named after Arturo Umberto Illia, the 34th President of Argentina. There are no regular flights to or from the airport, as of February 2012.

== See also ==
- Transport in Argentina
- List of airports in Argentina
