= Lago Musters Airport =

Airport in Argentina

Lago Musters Airport Aeródromo de Sarmiento
- IATA: OLN; ICAO: SAVM

Summary
- Airport type: Public
- Serves: Sarmiento, Argentina
- Elevation AMSL: 889 ft / 271 m
- Coordinates: 45°34′30″S 69°04′40″W

Map
- Location of airport in Argentina

Runways
| Direction | Length | | Surface |
| Direction | m | ft | Surface |
|---|---|---|---|
| 09/27 | 980 | 3,215 | Dirt |
- Source: GCM Google Maps FallingRain

Lago Musters Airport (IATA: OLN, ICAO: SAVM) is a public use airport just northwest of Sarmiento, a town in the Chubut Province of Argentina.

== See also ==
- Transport in Argentina
- List of airports in Argentina
