= Carmen de Patagones Airport =

Airport in Argentina

- IATA: CPG; ICAO: none

Summary
- Airport type: Public
- Serves: Carmen de Patagones, Argentina
- Elevation AMSL: 131 ft / 40 m
- Coordinates: 40°46′40″S 62°58′45″W

Map
- Location of the airport in Argentina

Runways
| Direction | Length | | Surface |
| Direction | m | ft | Surface |
|---|---|---|---|
| 04/22 | 1,455 | 4,774 | Grass |
- Source: GCM Google Maps

Carmen de Patagones Airport (IATA: CPG) is an airport serving the city of Carmen de Patagones in the Buenos Aires Province of Argentina. The airport is on the northern edge of Carmen de Patagones.

== See also ==
- Transport in Argentina
- List of airports in Argentina
