= Clorinda Airport =

Clorinda Airport Aeropuerto Clorinda
- IATA: CLX; ICAO: SATC

Summary
- Airport type: Public
- Serves: Clorinda
- Location: Argentina
- Elevation AMSL: 196 ft / 60 m
- Coordinates: 25°18′17.1″S 057°44′5.4″W

Map
- Location of Clorinda Airport in Argentina

Runways
Direction	Length		Surface
Direction	ft	m	Surface
02/20	4,330	1,320	Grass
- Source: Landings.com

Clorinda Airport (Spanish: Aeropuerto Clorinda, IATA: CLX, ICAO: SATC) is a public use airport located 2 kilometres (1 mi) south-southwest of Clorinda, Formosa, Argentina.

== See also ==
- List of airports in Argentina
