= Capitán José Daniel Vazquez Airport =

Airport in Argentina

- IATA: ULA; ICAO: SAWJ

Summary
- Airport type: Public
- Serves: Puerto San Julián, Argentina
- Elevation AMSL: 190 ft (58 m)
- Coordinates: 49°18′25″S 67°48′10″W

Map
- Location of the airport in Argentina

Runways
Direction	Length		Surface
Direction	m	ft	Surface
07/25	2,000	6,562	Concrete
- Sources: WAD Google Maps SkyVector

Capitán José Daniel Vazquez Airport (IATA: ULA, ICAO: SAWJ), also known as Puerto San Julián Airport or San Julián Airport, is an airport serving Puerto San Julián, a town on San Julian Bay in the Santa Cruz Province of Argentina. The airport is 4 kilometres (2 mi) west of the town.

There is a steep ravine on the south side of the west end of the runway. Runway 07 has an unusual narrow extension prior to the marked threshold, with a turnaround at the end. If used for takeoff, the runway length available would be extended to 2,400 metres (7,900 ft).

The San Julian VOR-DME (Ident: SJU) is located on the field.

== See also ==
- Transport in Argentina
- List of airports in Argentina
