= Laboulaye Airport =

Airport in Argentina

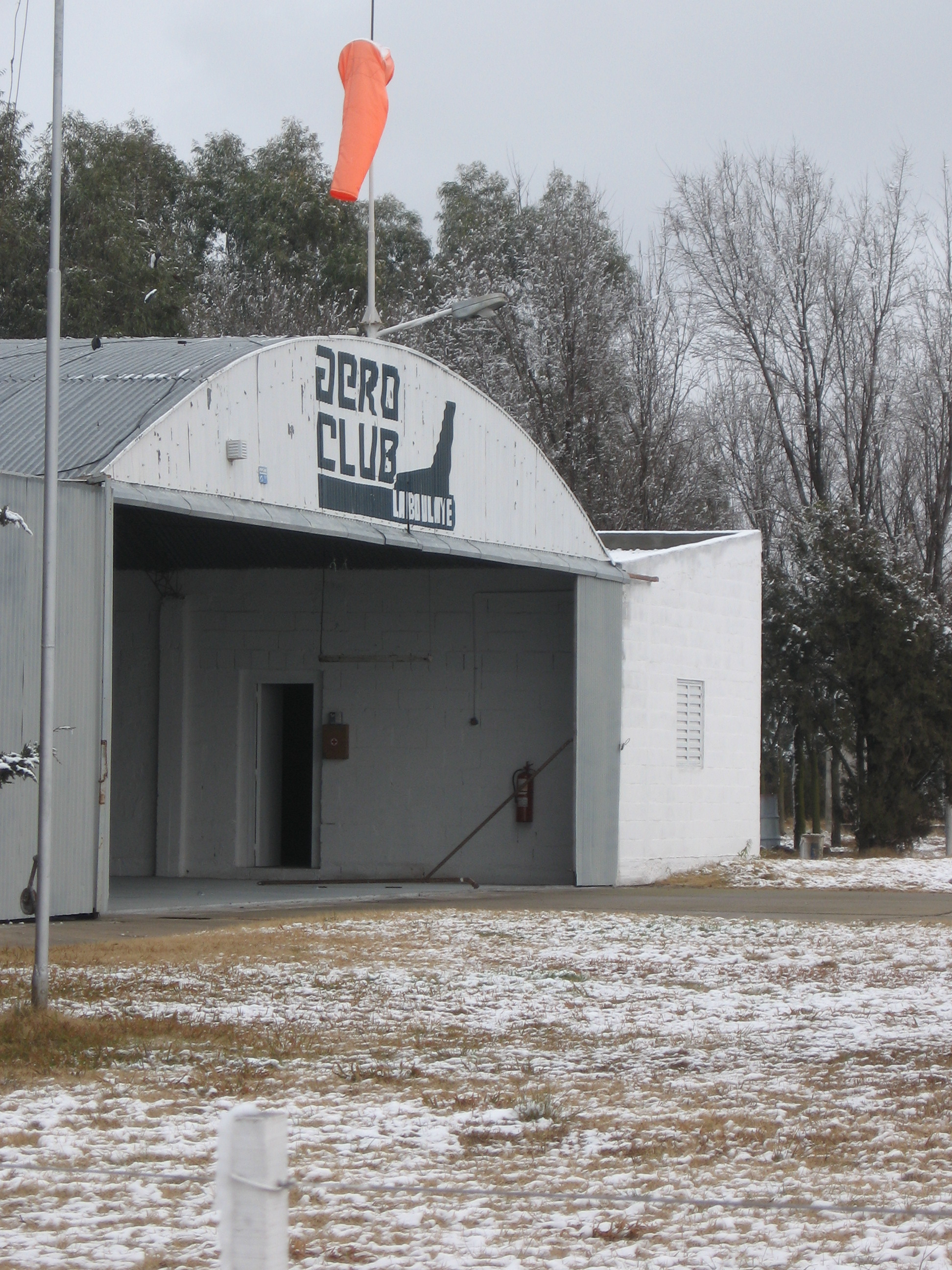
- IATA: none; ICAO: SAOL; LID: LYE

Summary
- Airport type: Public
- Owner/Operator: Aeroclub Laboulaye
- Serves: Laboulaye, Argentina
- Elevation AMSL: 449 ft / 137 m
- Coordinates: 34°08′05″S 63°21′44″W

Map
- Location in Argentina

Runways
Direction	Length		Surface
Direction	m	ft	Surface
18/36	1,200	3,937	Asphalt
- Sources: WAD GCM Google Maps

Laboulaye Airport (ICAO: SAOL) is an airport serving Laboulaye, a town in the Córdoba Province of Argentina. The airport is 1 kilometre (0.6 mi) east of the town.

The airport belongs to the Aero Club Laboulaye and has a paved runway 1200 m long by 23 m wide with a beacon for night operations.

The Laboulaye VOR (Ident: LYE) is located at the south end of the airport.

== See also ==
- Transport in Argentina
- List of airports in Argentina
