= Mazaruca Airport =

Airport in Argentina

- IATA: none; ICAO: SAAM

Summary
- Airport type: Public
- Serves: Mazaruca, Argentina
- Elevation AMSL: 10 ft / 3 m
- Coordinates: 33°36′05″S 59°16′30″W

Map
- Location of Mazaruca Airport in Argentina

Runways
Direction	Length		Surface
Direction	m	ft	Surface
05/23	1,100	3,609	Grass
- Source: Landings.com Google Maps GCM

Mazaruca Airport (ICAO: SAAM) is a public use airstrip serving Mazaruca, a hamlet on the eastern bank of the Paraná Ibicuy River (es) in the Entre Ríos Province of Argentina. The runway follows an unpaved road running northeast from a northern corner of the hamlet.

Our Airports reports the airport is closed, runway unusable.

== See also ==
- Transport in Argentina
- List of airports in Argentina
