= Ascochinga Airport =

- IATA: none; ICAO: SACN

Summary
- Airport type: Public
- Serves: Ascochinga
- Location: Argentina
- Elevation AMSL: 677 ft / 206 m
- Coordinates: 30°59′24.8″S 64°14′38.5″W

Map
- Location of Ascochinga Airport in Argentina

Runways
Direction	Length		Surface
Direction	m	ft	Surface
02/20	1,183	3,880	GRASS
- Source: Landings.com

Ascochinga Airport (ICAO: SACN) is a public use airport serving the town of Ascochinga, Córdoba, Argentina.

== See also ==
- List of airports in Argentina
