= Maquinchao Airport =

Airport in Argentina

Maquinchao Airport Aeropuerto Maquinchao
- IATA: MQD; ICAO: SAVQ

Summary
- Airport type: Public
- Serves: Maquinchao, Argentina
- Elevation AMSL: 2,910 ft / 887 m
- Coordinates: 41°14′33″S 68°42′25″W

Map
- Location of airport in Argentina

Runways
Direction	Length		Surface
Direction	m	ft	Surface
06/24	1,146	3,760	Grass
08/26	1,172	3,845	Grass
- Source: Landings.com Google Maps GCM

Maquinchao Airport (Spanish: Aeropuerto Maquinchao, IATA: MQD, ICAO: SAVQ) is a public use airport on the northern edge of Maquinchao, a town in the Río Negro Province of Argentina.

== See also ==
- Transport in Argentina
- List of airports in Argentina
