= Santa Fé Airport =

Airport in Argentina

- IATA: none; ICAO: SAFE

Summary
- Airport type: Closed
- Serves: Santa Fé, Argentina
- Elevation AMSL: 43 ft / 13 m
- Coordinates: 31°39′34″S 60°48′53″W

Map
- Location of airport in Argentina

Runways
Direction	Length		Surface
Direction	m	ft	Surface
Closed
- Source: Landings.com Google Maps

Santa Fé Airport (ICAO: SAFE) was a public use airport located 10 kilometres (6 mi) west-southwest of Santa Fé, Santa Fe, Argentina.

Google Earth Historical Imagery (4/18/2002) and current Google Maps show the former runway under varying degrees of water in a generally marshy area.

== See also ==
- Transport in Argentina
- List of airports in Argentina
