= Benito Juárez Airport (Argentina) =

Airport in Buenos Aires, Argentina

Benito Juárez Airport Aeropuerto Benito Juárez
- IATA: none; ICAO: SAZJ

Summary
- Airport type: Public
- Serves: Benito Juárez
- Location: Argentina
- Elevation AMSL: 695 ft / 212 m
- Coordinates: 37°42′22.0″S 059°47′31.4″W

Map
- Location of Benito Juárez Airport in Argentina

Runways
Direction	Length		Surface
Direction	ft	m	Surface
18/36	3,300	1,006	Grass
08/26	3,600	1,097	Grass
- Source: Landings.com

Benito Juárez Airport (Spanish: Aeropuerto Benito Juárez, ICAO: SAZJ) is a public use airport located near Benito Juárez, Buenos Aires, Argentina.

== See also ==
- List of airports in Argentina
