= Puelches Airport =

Airport in Argentina

Puelches Airport Aeropuerto de Puelches
- IATA: none; ICAO: SAZU

Summary
- Airport type: Public
- Serves: Puelches, Argentina
- Elevation AMSL: 180 m / 591 ft
- Coordinates: 38°08′45″S 65°55′25″W

Map
- Location of airport in Argentina

Runways
Direction	Length		Surface
Direction	m	ft	Surface
01/19	810	2,657	Grass
06/24	915	3,002	Grass
- Source: Landings.com Google Maps GCM

Puelches Airport (Spanish: Aeropuerto de Puelches, ICAO: SAZU) is a public use airport serving Puelches, a village in the La Pampa Province of Argentina. The runways are on the west side of the village.

The Choele Choel VOR-DME (Ident: OEL) is located 69.8 nautical miles (129 km) south-southeast of the airport.

== See also ==
- Transport in Argentina
- List of airports in Argentina
