= Puerto Deseado Airport =

Airport in Argentina

- IATA: PUD; ICAO: SAWD

Summary
- Airport type: Public
- Serves: Puerto Deseado, Argentina
- Elevation AMSL: 266 ft / 81 m
- Coordinates: 47°44′08″S 65°54′15″W

Map
- Location of the airport in Argentina

Runways
Direction	Length		Surface
Direction	m	ft	Surface
06/24	1,655	5,430	Asphalt
- Source: WAD Google Maps GCM

Puerto Deseado Airport (IATA: PUD, ICAO: SAWD) is an airport serving Puerto Deseado, a port town at the mouth of the Deseado River in the Santa Cruz Province of Argentina. As of February 2012, no scheduled services are operated.

The airport is on the north edge of Puerto Deseado and 2 kilometres (1.2 mi) inland from the river estuary. The Puerto Deseado non-directional beacon (Ident: ADO) is located on the field. The closed Puerto Deseado West Airport is located 2.5 kilometres (1.6 mi) northwest of the airport.

== See also ==
- List of airports in Argentina
- Transport in Argentina
