= Villa de Soto Airport =

Airport in Argentina

- IATA: none; ICAO: SACS

Summary
- Airport type: Public
- Serves: Villa de Soto (es)
- Location: Argentina
- Elevation AMSL: 2,013 ft / 614 m
- Coordinates: 30°52′30″S 64°59′34″W

Map
- Location of airport in Argentina

Runways
Direction	Length		Surface
Direction	m	ft	Surface
04/22	1,216	3,990	Grass
- Source: Landings.com Google Maps

Villa de Soto Airport (ICAO: SACS) is a public use airport located 2 kilometres (1 mi) south of Villa de Soto (es), a town on the Avalos River in the Córdoba of Argentina. The runway lies alongside Provincial Route 15.

The Cordoba VOR-DME (Ident: CBA) is located 48.1 nautical miles (89 km) southeast of the airport.

== See also ==
- Transport in Argentina
- List of airports in Argentina
