= Azul Airport =

Azul Airport Aeródromo de Azul
- IATA: none; ICAO: SAZA

Summary
- Airport type: Public
- Serves: Azul
- Location: Argentina
- Elevation AMSL: 433 ft / 132 m
- Coordinates: 36°50′13.8″S 059°52′50.6″W

Map
- Location of Azul Airport in Argentina

Runways
Direction	Length		Surface
Direction	ft	m	Surface
17/35	4,700	1,433	Grass
09/27	2,680	817	Grass
- Source: Landings.com

Azul Airport (Spanish: Aeródromo de Azul, ICAO: SAZA) is a public use airport located near Azul, Buenos Aires, Argentina.

== See also ==
- List of airports in Argentina
