= Gobernador Gordillo Airport =

Airport in Argentina

- IATA: none; ICAO: SACT

Summary
- Airport type: Public
- Serves: Chamical
- Elevation AMSL: 1,503 ft / 458 m
- Coordinates: 30°20′43″S 66°17′37″W

Map
- Location of the airport in Argentina

Runways
Direction	Length		Surface
Direction	ft	m	Surface
01/19	6,726	2,050	Asphalt
- Sources: World Aero Data

Gobernador Gordillo Airport (ICAO: SACT), also known as Chamical Airport, is an airport serving Chamical, La Rioja, Argentina.

== See also ==
- List of airports in Argentina
