= Villa María de Río Seco Airport =

Airport in Argentina

Villa de María del Río Seco Airport
- IATA: none; ICAO: SACV

Summary
- Airport type: Closed
- Serves: Villa de María del Río Seco, Argentina
- Elevation AMSL: 953 ft / 290 m
- Coordinates: 29°55′30″S 63°38′38″W

Map
- Location in Argentina

Runways
Direction	Length		Surface
Direction	m	ft	Surface
Closed
- Source: Landings.com Google Maps

Villa María de Río Seco Airport (ICAO: SACV) was a rural airstrip 8 kilometres (5 mi) east of Villa de María del Río Seco, a town in the Córdoba Province of Argentina.

Google Earth Historical Imagery (8/9/2002) shows a 850 metres (2,790 ft) grass runway. The (9/16/2013) image and current Google Maps image show the runway returned to cropland.

== See also ==
- Transport in Argentina
- List of airports in Argentina
