= Monte Quemado Airport =

Airport in Argentina

Monte Quemado Airport Aeropuerto de Monte Quemado
- IATA: none; ICAO: SACQ

Summary
- Airport type: Public
- Serves: Monte Quemado, Argentina
- Elevation AMSL: 722 ft / 220 m
- Coordinates: 25°47′00″S 62°49′44″W

Map
- Location of airport in Argentina

Runways
Direction	Length		Surface
Direction	m	ft	Surface
02/20	1,510	4,954	Asphalt
- Source: Landings.com Google Maps

Monte Quemado Airport (Spanish: Aeropuerto de Monte Quemado, ICAO: SACQ) is a public use airport 2 kilometres (1 mi) north of Monte Quemado, a town in the Santiago del Estero Province of Argentina.

== See also ==
- Transport in Argentina
- List of airports in Argentina
