= Villa Angela Airport =

Airport in Argentina

- IATA: none; ICAO: SARV

Summary
- Airport type: Public
- Serves: Villa Angela, Argentina
- Elevation AMSL: 246 ft / 75 m
- Coordinates: 27°35′35″S 60°41′10″W

Map
- Location of airport in Argentina

Runways
Direction	Length		Surface
Direction	m	ft	Surface
13/31	1,200	3,937	Grass
01/19	1,800	5,906	Grass
- Source: Landings.com Google Maps

Villa Angela Airport (ICAO: SARV) is a public use airport located just southeast of Villa Angela, a city in the Chaco Province of Argentina.

The Resistencia VOR-DME (Ident: SIS) is located 87.2 nautical miles (161 km) east of the airport.

== See also ==
- Transport in Argentina
- List of airports in Argentina
