= José de San Martín Airport (Chubut) =

Airport in Argentina

- IATA: JSM; ICAO: SAWS

Summary
- Airport type: Public
- Serves: José de San Martín
- Elevation AMSL: 2,395 ft / 730 m
- Coordinates: 44°02′50″S 70°26′55″W

Map
- Location of the airport in Argentina

Runways
Direction	Length		Surface
Direction	m	ft	Surface
10/28	1,650	5,413	Dirt
07/25	1,525	5,003	Dirt
- Sources: GCM Google Maps

José de San Martín Airport (IATA: JSM, ICAO: SAWS) is an airport with two runways serving the city of José de San Martín in Chubut Province, Argentina, named after José de San Martin, the Argentine General who liberated Argentina from the Spanish empire.

The José de San Martin non-directional beacon (ident: JSM) is located at the field.

== See also ==
- List of airports in Argentina
- Transport in Argentina
