= Necochea Airport =

Airport in Argentina

- IATA: NEC; ICAO: SAZO

Summary
- Airport type: Public
- Serves: Necochea, Argentina
- Elevation AMSL: 72 ft / 22 m
- Coordinates: 38°29′25″S 58°49′00″W

Map
- Location of the airport in Argentina

Runways
Direction	Length		Surface
Direction	m	ft	Surface
13/31	800	2,625	Grass
17/35	1,090	3,576	Grass
18/36	1,501	4,925	Asphalt
- Source: ORSNA WAD SkyVector Google Maps

Necochea Airport (IATA: NEC, ICAO: SAZO) is an airport serving Necochea, an Atlantic coastal city in the Buenos Aires Province of Argentina. The airport is in the countryside 8 kilometres (5 mi) northwest of the city.

The airport covers an area of 280 hectares (690 acres), and has a 460 square metres (5,000 sq ft) terminal.

== See also ==
- Transport in Argentina
- List of airports in Argentina
