= Ituzaingó Yacireta Airport =

Airport in Argentina

Ituzaingó Yacyretá Airport Aeropuerto de Ituzaingó Yacyretá
- IATA: none; ICAO: SARO

Summary
- Airport type: Public
- Serves: Ituzaingó, Argentina
- Elevation AMSL: 62 m / 203 ft
- Coordinates: 27°31′30″S 56°38′05″W

Map
- Location of airport in Argentina

Runways
Direction	Length		Surface
Direction	m	ft	Surface
14/32	1,230	4,035	Gravel
- Source: Landings.com Google Maps

Ituzaingó Yacyretá Airport (Spanish: Aeropuerto de Ituzaingó Yacyretá, ICAO: SARO) is a public use airport serving Ituzaingó, a town on the Paraná River in Corrientes Province, Argentina. The airport is 7 kilometres (4 mi) northeast of Ituzaingó, on the southern shore of the Yacyretá Reservoir, and 9 kilometres (6 mi) southeast of the Yacyretá lock and dam complex.

A wide corridor of high-tension transmission lines runs southeast from the Yacyretá hydroelectric power plant, parallel to the runway less than 1 kilometre (0.6 mi) away. Northwest approach and departure may be over the water. The Paraguay/Argentina international border is 8 kilometres (5.0 mi) northwest of the airport.

The Posadas VOR-DME (Ident: POS) is located 36.4 nautical miles (67 km) east-northeast of the airport.

== See also ==
- Transport in Argentina
- List of airports in Argentina
