= Río Tercero Airport =

Airport in Argentina

Río Tercero Airport Aeropuerto Río Tercero
- IATA: none; ICAO: SAOE

Summary
- Airport type: Public
- Serves: Río Tercero, Argentina
- Elevation AMSL: 1,243 ft / 379 m
- Coordinates: 32°10′25″S 64°5′18″W

Map
- Location of airport in Argentina

Runways
Direction	Length		Surface
Direction	m	ft	Surface
18/36	1,417	4,649	Grass
- Source: Landings.com Google Maps Falling Rain

Río Tercero Airport (Spanish: Aeropuerto Río Tercero, ICAO: SAOE) is a public use airport 2 kilometres (1 mi) east of Río Tercero, a city in the Córdoba Province of Argentina.

The Cordoba VOR-DME (Ident: CBA) is located 52.0 nautical miles (96 km) north of the airport.

== See also ==
- Transport in Argentina
- List of airports in Argentina
