= Bernardo de Irigoyen Airport =

Bernardo de Irigoyen Airport Aeropuerto Bernardo de Irigoyen
- IATA: none; ICAO: SATI

Summary
- Airport type: Public
- Serves: Bernardo de Irigoyen
- Location: Argentina
- Elevation AMSL: 2,660 ft / 811 m
- Coordinates: 26°15′0.0″S 053°37′45.9″W

Map
- Location of Bernardo de Irigoyen Airport in Argentina

Runways
Direction	Length		Surface
Direction	ft	m	Surface
15/33	1,090	332	Grass
- Source: Landings.com

Bernardo de Irigoyen Airport (Spanish: Aeropuerto Bernardo de Irigoyen, ICAO: SATI) is a public use airport located 2 kilometres (1 mi) east of Bernardo de Irigoyen, Misiones, Argentina.

== See also ==
- List of airports in Argentina
