= Valcheta Airport =

Airport in Argentina

- IATA: VCF; ICAO: none

Summary
- Airport type: Closed
- Serves: Valcheta, Argentina
- Elevation AMSL: 627 ft / 191 m
- Coordinates: 40°42′00″S 66°09′00″W

Map
- Location of airport in Argentina

Runways
Direction	Length		Surface
Direction	m	ft	Surface
Closed
- Source: Landings.com Google Maps

Valcheta Airport (IATA: VCF) is a public airport located 1.6 kilometres (1 mi) south-southeast of Valcheta, Río Negro, Argentina.

Google Maps shows the runways and taxiways taken over by brush and scrub.

== See also ==
- Transport in Argentina
- List of airports in Argentina
- Talk:Valcheta Airport
