= Tandil Airport =

Airport in Argentina

Tandil Airport (Héroes de Malvinas Airport) Aeropuerto de Tandil
- IATA: TDL; ICAO: SAZT

Summary
- Airport type: Public
- Operator: Government Anac Tandil, Argentina
- Elevation AMSL: 576 ft (176 m)
- Coordinates: 37°14′00″S 59°13′45″W

Map
- Location of the airport in Argentina

Runways
Direction	Length		Surface
Direction	m	ft	Surface
01/19	2,550	8,366	Concrete
- Source: Landings SkyVector

Tandil Airport (Spanish: Aeropuerto Tandil, IATA: TDL, ICAO: SAZT) is an airport serving the city of Tandil, in the Buenos Aires Province of Argentina. The airport is 11 kilometres (7 mi) northwest of the city. Most flights are for military training.

== Airlines and destinations ==
Airlines	Destinations
Humming Airways	Buenos Aires–Aeroparque

== See also ==
- Transport in Argentina
- List of airports in Argentina
