= Miramar Airport =

Airport in Argentina

- IATA: MJR; ICAO: SAEM

Summary
- Airport type: Public
- Serves: Miramar, Argentina
- Elevation AMSL: 43 ft / 13 m
- Coordinates: 38°13′40″S 57°52′15″W

Map
- Location of airport in Argentina

Runways
Direction	Length		Surface
Direction	m	ft	Surface
18/36	1,856	6,089	Asphalt
04/22	632	2,073	Grass
- Source: Landings.com Google Maps GCM

Miramar Airport (IATA: MJR, ICAO: SAEM) is a public use airport serving Miramar, an Atlantic coastal town in the Buenos Aires Province of Argentina. The airport is 4 kilometres (2 mi) northwest of the town.

Runway length includes a 75 metres (246 ft) displaced threshold on each end of the runway. The Mar del Plata VOR-DME (Ident: MDP) is located 22.6 nautical miles (42 km) northeast of the airport.

== See also ==
- Transport in Argentina
- List of airports in Argentina
