= Charata Airport =

Airport in Chaco Province, Argentina

- IATA: CNT; ICAO: none

Summary
- Airport type: Public
- Serves: Charata, Argentina
- Elevation AMSL: 318 ft / 97 m
- Coordinates: 27°13′00″S 61°12′36″W

Map
- Location of the airport in Argentina

Runways
Direction	Length		Surface
Direction	m	ft	Surface
01/19	1,125	3,691	Grass
10/28	900	2,953	Grass
- Source: GCM Google Maps

Charata Airport (IATA: CNT) is an airport serving the town of Charata in the Chaco Province of Argentina. The airport is at the western edge of Charata.

The airport has crossing runways. Runway 10/28 is only partially marked.

== See also ==
- Transport in Argentina
- List of airports in Argentina
