= General Villegas Airport =

Airport in Argentina

- IATA: VGS; ICAO: none

Summary
- Airport type: Public
- Serves: General Villegas, Argentina
- Elevation AMSL: 383 ft (117 m)
- Coordinates: 34°59′31″S 62°59′52″W

Map
- Location of the airport in Argentina

Runways
Direction	Length		Surface
Direction	m	ft	Surface
03/21		Closed
13/31		Closed
- Source: GCM Google Maps

General Villegas Airport (IATA: VGS) is an airport serving the town of General Villegas in the Buenos Aires Province of Argentina. The airport is 3 kilometres (2 mi) north of General Villegas.

The airport has crossing runways. The asphalt Runway 03/21 is marked closed. The 910 metres (2,990 ft) grass Runway 13/31 is marked closed as of 11/17/2016. Google Earth Historical Imagery shows the runway was closed sometime after 3/4/2016 due to flooding in its central section.

The Laboulaye VOR (Ident: LYE) is located 54.6 nautical miles (101 km) north-northwest of the airport. The General Pico VOR (Ident: GPI) is located 55.5 nautical miles (103 km) southwest of General Villegas Airport.

== See also ==
- Transport in Argentina
- List of airports in Argentina
- Talk:General Villegas Airport
