= Aeroclub Argentino =

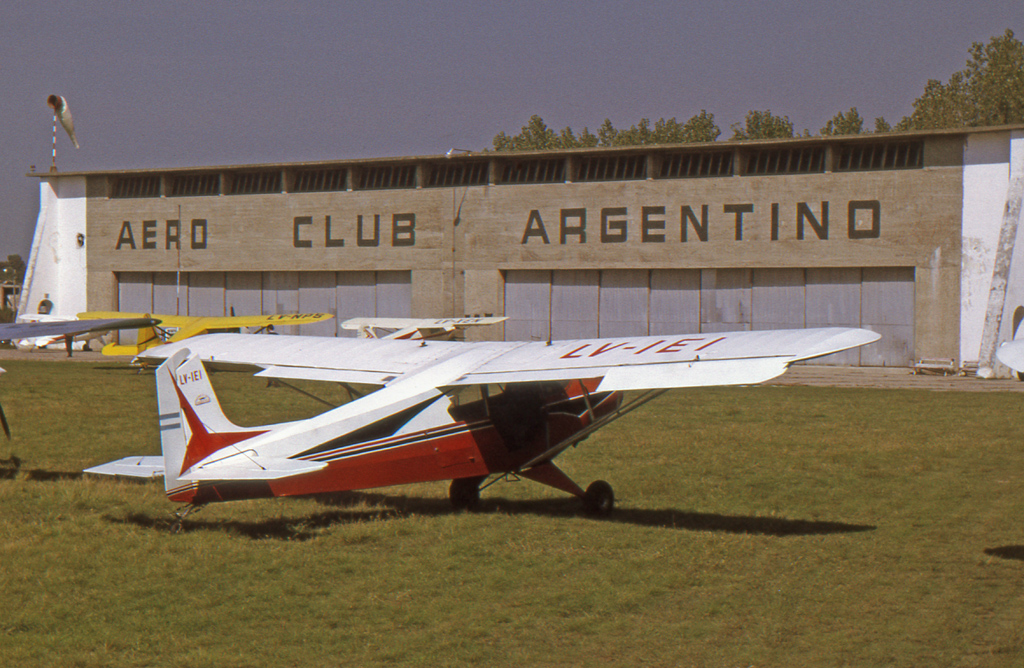
- Aero Boero AB-95 three-seat light civil aircraft at Buenos Aires San Justo airfield.
- IATA: none; ICAO: SADS

Summary
- Airport type: Public
- Serves: San Justo, Argentina
- Elevation AMSL: 62 ft / 19 m
- Coordinates: 34°43′55″S 58°35′45″W

Map
- Location of airport in Argentina

Runways
Direction	Length		Surface
Direction	m	ft	Surface
12/30	660	2,165	Grass
- Source: Landings.com Google Maps

Aeroclub Argentino (ICAO: SADS) is a public use airport located near San Justo, Buenos Aires, Argentina.

Google Earth Historical Imagery (9/1/2012) shows former grass Runway 16/34 was abandoned in 2012. Current Google Maps shows Runway 12/30 is unmarked.

== See also ==
- Transport in Argentina
- List of airports in Argentina
