= Mercedes Airport =

Airport in Argentina

Mercedes Airport Aeropuerto Mercedes
- IATA: MDX; ICAO: SATM

Summary
- Airport type: Public
- Serves: Mercedes, Argentina
- Elevation AMSL: 351 ft / 107 m
- Coordinates: 29°13′15″S 58°5′15″W

Map
- Location of airport in Argentina

Runways
Direction	Length		Surface
Direction	m	ft	Surface
03/21	1,801	5,909	Asphalt
- Source: Landings.com Google Maps SkyVector

Mercedes Airport (Spanish: Aeropuerto Mercedes, IATA: MDX, ICAO: SATM) is a public use airport serving Mercedes, a town in the Corrientes Province of Argentina. The airport is 3 kilometres (2 mi) south of the town.

The Mercedes non-directional beacon (Ident: RCE) is located on the field.

== See also ==
- Transport in Argentina
- List of airports in Argentina
