= Valle del Conlara Airport =

Airport in Argentina

- IATA: RLO; ICAO: SAOS

Summary
- Airport type: Public
- Serves: Santa Rosa de Conlara, Argentina
- Elevation AMSL: 2,021 ft (616 m)
- Coordinates: 32°23′05″S 65°11′10″W

Map
- Location of airport in Argentina

Runways
Direction	Length		Surface
Direction	m	ft	Surface
02/20	2,550	8,366	Concrete
- Source: Landings.com Google Maps SkyVector

Valle del Conlara Airport (IATA: RLO, ICAO: SAOS) is an international airport serving Santa Rosa de Conlara, a town in the San Luis Province of Argentina. The airport is in the countryside 5 kilometres (3 mi) southeast of the town. It also serves the city of Merlo, 16 kilometres (10 mi) to the east.

The Santa Rosa De Conlara VOR-DME (Ident: SRC) is located on the field.

== Airlines and destinations ==
Airlines	Destinations
Aerolíneas Argentinas	Buenos Aires–Aeroparque
LADE	Buenos Aires–Aeroparque, Villa Mercedes

== See also ==
- Transport in Argentina
- List of airports in Argentina
