= Marcos Juárez Airport =

Airport in Argentina

Marcos Juárez Airport Aeródromo Marcos Juárez
- IATA: none; ICAO: SAOM

Summary
- Airport type: Public
- Serves: Marcos Juárez, Argentina
- Elevation AMSL: 360 ft / 110 m
- Coordinates: 32°41′00″S 62°09′20″W

Map
- Location of the airport in Argentina

Runways
Direction	Length		Surface
Direction	m	ft	Surface
07/25	1,205	3,953	Asphalt
- Source: Landings.com Google Maps SkyVector

Marcos Juárez Airport (Spanish: Aeródromo Marcos Juárez, (ICAO: SAOM)) is a public use airport located 4 kilometres (2 mi) west of Marcos Juárez, a city in the Córdoba Province of Argentina.

The Marcos Juarez VOR (Ident: MJZ) is located on the field.

== See also ==
- Transport in Argentina
- List of airports in Argentina
