= Campo Arenal Aerodrome =

Campo Arenal Aerodrome Aeródromo de Campo Arenal
- IATA: none; ICAO: none

Summary
- Airport type: Private
- Owner: Minera Alumbrera
- Serves: Campo Arenal, Catamarca Province, Argentina.
- Location: 60km south from Santa María, Argentina
- Elevation AMSL: 7,622 ft (2,323 m)
- Coordinates: 27°04′20″S 066°35′10″W
- Interactive map of Campo Arenal Aerodrome

Runways
Direction	Length		Surface
Direction	m	ft	Surface
06/24	1,915	6,383	Asphalt
- Source: DAFIF

Campo Arenal Aerodrome (Spanish: Aeródromo de Campo Arenal), also known as Minera Alumbrera Airport (Spanish: Aeropuerto Minera Alumbrera) is an airport in Campo Arenal in the Catamarca Province of Argentina. It was built in 1995, by mining company Minera La Alumbrera. Located on a flat plain approximately 75 km (47 mi) northwest of the Bajo de La Alumbrera Mine, the private airport serves the mine and its administration. In 2006, American Jet provided three daily flights from Tucumán using Metro 23 aircraft.

== Airlines ==
Airlines	Destinations
American Jet	Charter: Catamarca
