= Capitán Omar Darío Gerardi Airport =

Capitán Darío Omar Gerardi Airport
- IATA: none; ICAO: SACA

Summary
- Airport type: Military
- Location: Córdoba
- Elevation AMSL: 1,594 ft / 486 m
- Coordinates: 31°26′31″S 64°15′30″W

Map
- Location in Argentina

Runways
Direction	Length		Surface
Direction	ft	m	Surface
16/34	4,232	1,290	Asphalt
- Sources: World Aero Data

Capitán Omar Darío Gerardi Airport (ICAO: SACA) is a military airport located in Córdoba, Argentina.

== See also ==
- Fabrica Argentina de Aviones
- List of airports in Argentina
