= Dolores Airport (Argentina) =

Airport in Argentina

Dolores Airport Aeródromo Dolores
- IATA: none; ICAO: SAZD

Summary
- Airport type: Public
- Serves: Dolores
- Location: Argentina
- Elevation AMSL: 30 ft / 9 m
- Coordinates: 36°19′11.3″S 057°43′14.9″W

Map
- Location of Dolores Airport in Argentina

Runways
Direction	Length		Surface
Direction	ft	m	Surface
18/36	4,000	1,219	Grass
04/22	3,400	1,036	Grass
- Source: Landings.com

Dolores Airport (Spanish: Aeródromo Dolores, ICAO: SAZD) is a public use airport located near Dolores, Buenos Aires, Argentina.

== See also ==
- List of airports in Argentina
