= Villa de Merlo =

City in Argentina

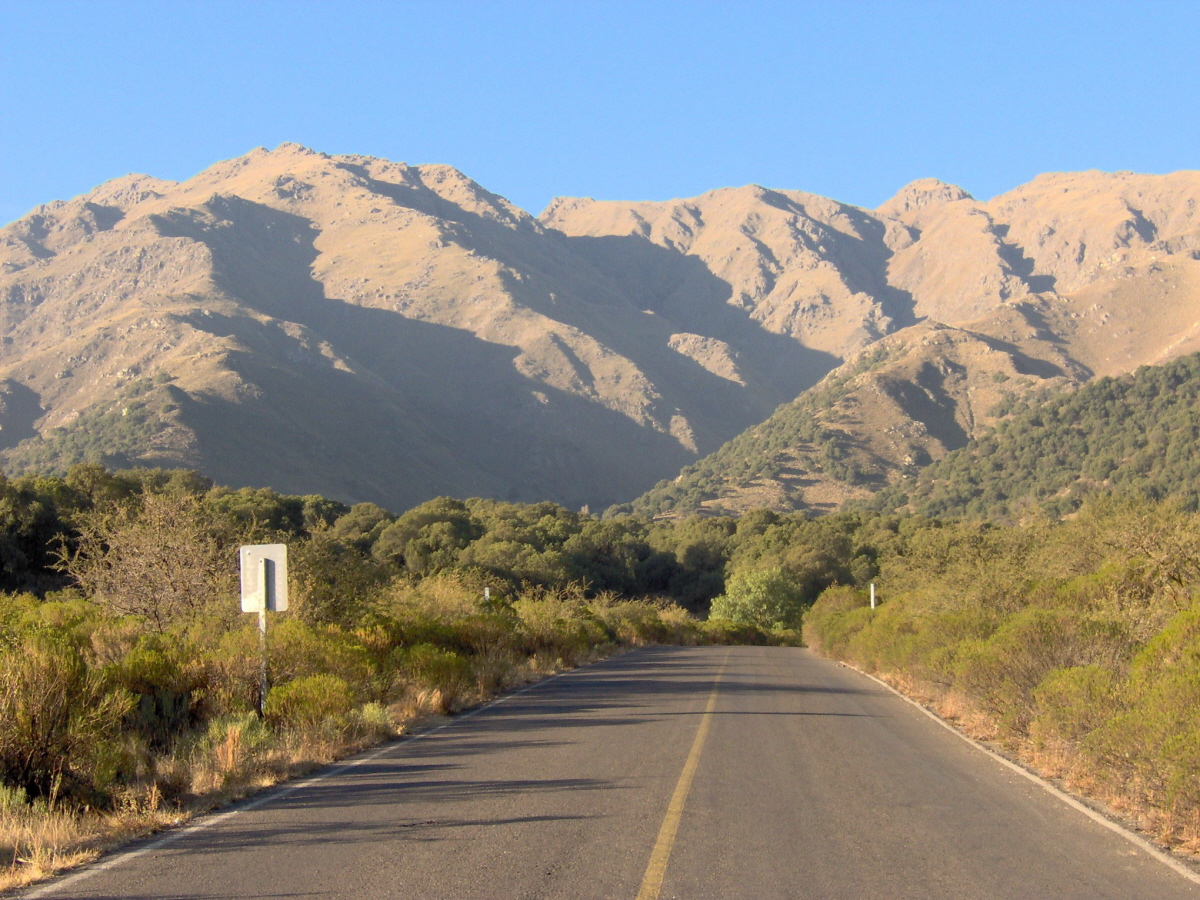
Road on the outskirts of Villa de Merlo

Villa de Merlo is a small city in the Department of Junín, Province of San Luis, Argentina. It is administered by a mayor Leonardo Rodriguez. The town lies 796 meters (abt. 2600 feet) above sea level. The local demonym for Merlo is a "Merlino".

Merlo is the third most populated country town in the province. The city is famous for its microclimate, specifically for the amount of negatively charged particles in the atmosphere. The weather is mostly mild and dry, with little wind, and the area has a number of streams.

== Location ==
Merlo is located 751 kilometers from Buenos Aires by the principal highway of the region, National Route 8 (Autopista Acceso Norte, Pilar, Pergamino, Venado Tuerto, toward Río Cuarto, and from there by Ruta Provincial 1 to Villa de Merlo ). Merlo is located 250 km from Córdoba, 650 km from the city of Rosario; 460 km from the city of Mendoza, and comparable distances from San Juan and La Rioja.

Valle del Conlara airport, 18 km (11 mi) from Merlo, was opened at the end of 2001. Additionally, the system of ground transport includes long-distance coaches which travel from different parts of the country to the new bus station in Merlo.

== Tourism ==
Villa de Merlo is a tourist area with Argentinian nationals, but is less known to Europeans and Americans, although it has a small ex-pat community.

- La Villa Colonial ("the colonial town"), whose settlement began at the end of the eighteenth century at Piedra Blanca, includes the chapel of Nuestra Señora del Rosario ("Our Lady of the Rosary"), a national monument and one of the oldest buildings in the country.
- La Villa Veraniega ("the summertime town") possesses an important infrastructure to support tourism.

=== Attractions ===
- "El Algarrobo Abuelo" ("the Grandfather Carob Tree") is a tree more than a thousand years old and measuring more than 6 meters. It has five very thick branches, some of which now touch the soil.
- Piedra Blanca, village
- Pasos Malos, on the outskirts of Merlo, is near Pasos Malos is Peñón del Colorado, with views of the Conlara valley.
- The resort of Rincón del Este, with a municipal camping site, a reservoir, and hotels. This area has swimming holes where El Rincón stream passes through.
- Paragliding, because of suitable conditions for the sport.
- Wildlife includes the Puma and the Andian Condor

=== Holidays ===
- "Fiesta Nacional del Valle del Sol" (National Festival of the Valley of the Sun)
- Folklore festival, held in February
- "Fiesta de la Dulzura" (Festival of Sweetness)
- "Fiesta de la Rosa" (Rose Festival)
- "Fiesta Nacional del Microclima" (National Festival of the Microclimate)
- "Encuentro Decir por la Madera" (Gathering to talk about wood)
- "Encuentro Nacional de Pintores Paisajistas" (National Gathering of Landscape Painters)
- "Encuentro de Arquitectos" (Gathering of Architects)

== History ==
In 1794, Juan de Videla visited Piedra Blanca and saw that the place was suitable for the foundation of a town, as he afterward informed the Marquess of Sobremonte. On October 1, 1796, Sobremonte ordered the formalization of its foundation, under the name of Villa de Melo ("Town of Melo"), given in honor of Pedro Melo of Portugal.

On the morning of January 1, 1797, the townsfolk witnessed the formal foundation of their town. The ceremony took place in front of the chapel, beside an image of the Virgin of the Rosary. (At the same time, Saint Augustine was chosen to be the patron saint of the town.) The name of the town was altered over time and became Villa de Merlo.

One may see, in Marqués de Sobremonte square, plaques which commemorate the ceremonial founding of the town, and he may visit the old communal well and the chapel of Nuestra Señora del Rosario nearby.

== Population ==
The census of 2010 showed a total population of 17.084. This figure includes the populations of Piedrablanca, Barranca Colorada, El Rincón, and El Rincón del Este. The population is 95% of European descent, with the remainder Native and Spanish mix. There is a small but thriving community of Americans, Germans and British expats who have made their homes and fortunes in Merlo.

== Transportation ==
=== Air ===
Villa de Merlo is served by Valle del Conlara Airport, with service on two airlines.
