= Chepes =

Coordinates: 31°16′S 66°35′W

- Municipality and village
- Interactive map of Chepes
- Country: Argentina
- Province: La Rioja Province
- Time zone: UTC−3 (ART)
- Climate: BSh

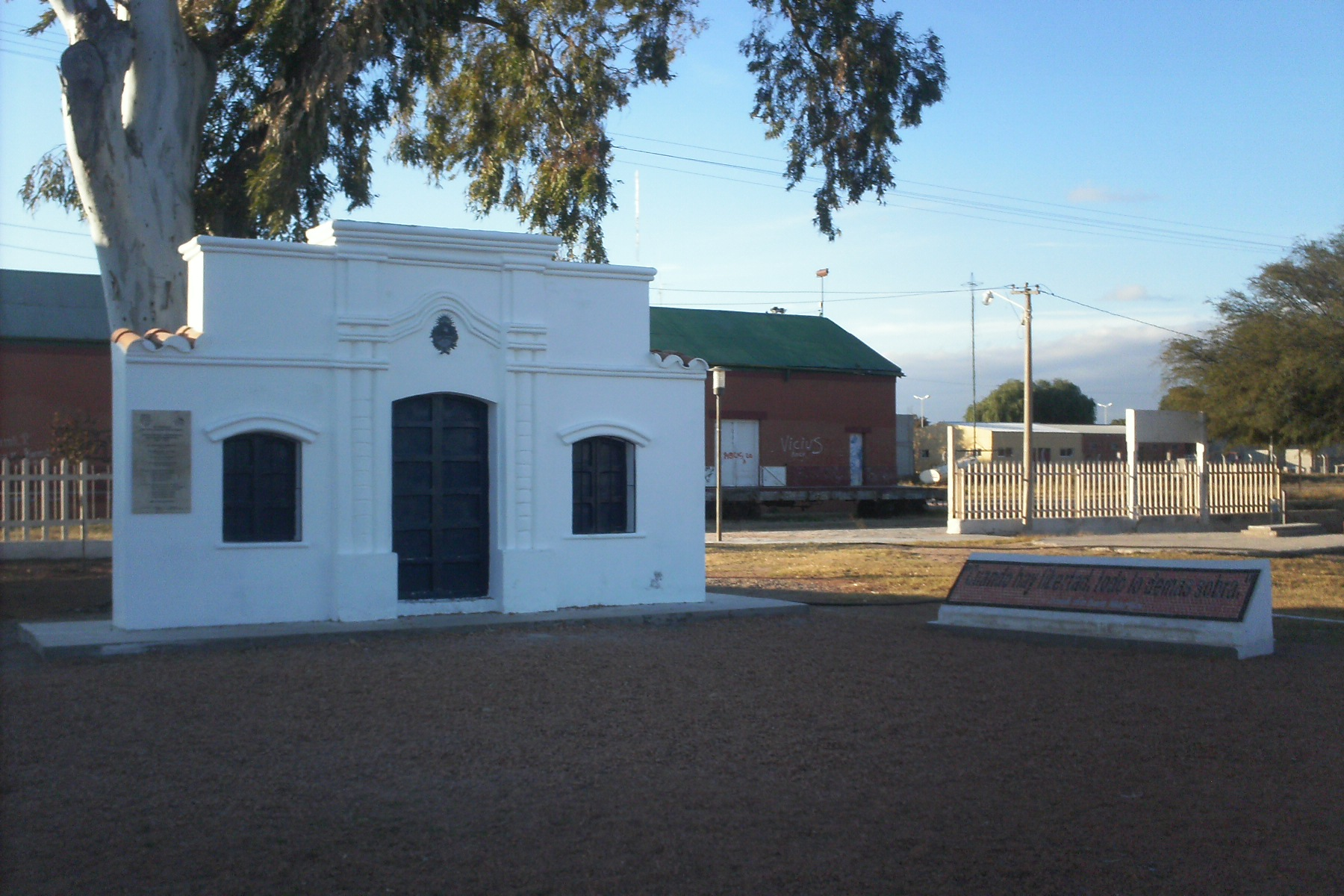
Bicentennial monument at the entrance to the town

Chepes is a municipality and village in La Rioja Province in northwestern Argentina.

== Geography ==
=== Climate ===
Climate data for Chepes (1961–1990, extremes 1961–present)
| Month | Jan | Feb | Mar | Apr | May | Jun | Jul | Aug | Sep | Oct | Nov | Dec | Year |
|---|---|---|---|---|---|---|---|---|---|---|---|---|---|
| Record high °C (°F) | 43.2 (109.8) | 41.5 (106.7) | 40.5 (104.9) | 35.8 (96.4) | 34.0 (93.2) | 34.0 (93.2) | 31.4 (88.5) | 37.0 (98.6) | 38.0 (100.4) | 42.9 (109.2) | 41.8 (107.2) | 45.7 (114.3) | 45.7 (114.3) |
| Mean daily maximum °C (°F) | 33.9 (93.0) | 32.3 (90.1) | 29.1 (84.4) | 25.3 (77.5) | 21.0 (69.8) | 16.7 (62.1) | 17.0 (62.6) | 20.1 (68.2) | 23.5 (74.3) | 28.3 (82.9) | 31.6 (88.9) | 33.4 (92.1) | 26.0 (78.8) |
| Daily mean °C (°F) | 26.2 (79.2) | 25.0 (77.0) | 22.2 (72.0) | 18.7 (65.7) | 14.8 (58.6) | 10.7 (51.3) | 10.5 (50.9) | 13.1 (55.6) | 16.2 (61.2) | 20.6 (69.1) | 23.7 (74.7) | 25.6 (78.1) | 18.9 (66.0) |
| Mean daily minimum °C (°F) | 19.9 (67.8) | 19.0 (66.2) | 16.9 (62.4) | 13.3 (55.9) | 9.4 (48.9) | 4.9 (40.8) | 4.6 (40.3) | 6.2 (43.2) | 9.6 (49.3) | 13.8 (56.8) | 16.9 (62.4) | 19.1 (66.4) | 12.8 (55.0) |
| Record low °C (°F) | 4.0 (39.2) | 6.5 (43.7) | 4.0 (39.2) | −1.0 (30.2) | −3.5 (25.7) | −6.5 (20.3) | −8.2 (17.2) | −6.5 (20.3) | −4.2 (24.4) | 1.8 (35.2) | 3.0 (37.4) | 7.0 (44.6) | −8.2 (17.2) |
| Average precipitation mm (inches) | 87.9 (3.46) | 75.9 (2.99) | 46.1 (1.81) | 12.1 (0.48) | 5.6 (0.22) | 4.5 (0.18) | 6.5 (0.26) | 6.1 (0.24) | 14.5 (0.57) | 20.4 (0.80) | 40.0 (1.57) | 69.3 (2.73) | 388.9 (15.31) |
| Average precipitation days (≥ 0.1 mm) | 6 | 5 | 4 | 2 | 1 | 1 | 1 | 1 | 2 | 2 | 3 | 6 | 34 |
| Average relative humidity (%) | 59 | 62 | 65 | 66 | 66 | 67 | 64 | 57 | 54 | 53 | 54 | 57 | 60 |
Source 1: NOAA,
Source 2: Servicio Meteorológico Nacional (precipitation days 1961–1990 and extremes)
