= Tinogasta =

- City
- Location of Tinogasta in Argentina
- Coordinates: 28°4′S 67°34′W
- Country: Argentina
- Province: Catamarca
- Department: Tinogasta

Government
  - Mayor: Hugo Ávila (Justicialist Party)
- Elevation: 1,500 m (4,900 ft)

Population (2010 census)
  - Total: 11,485
- Time zone: UTC−3 (ART)
- CPA base: K5340
- Dialing code: +54 3837

Tinogasta (Spanish pronunciation: [tinoˈɣasta]) is a city in the west of the province of Catamarca, Argentina, on the right-hand shore of the Abaucán River, about 280 km from the provincial capital San Fernando del Valle de Catamarca. It had about 11,500 inhabitants at the 2010 census [INDEC]. It is the head town of the department of the same name. The name of the city comes from the Kakana words tino ("meeting") and gasta ("town").

Tinogasta is a tourist site. It has access to the mountains for adventure tourism, hot springs, and archaeological museums. The basis of the local economy is agriculture, focused on vine.

Local lore tells that conquistador Diego de Almagro's expedition passed through the indigenous settlement of Tinogasta in 1536 before crossing the Andes at Pircas Negras into present-day Chile.

== Geography ==
=== Climate ===
The Köppen Climate Classification subtype for this climate is BWh (hot arid climate).

Climate data for Tinogasta (1991–2020, extremes 1961–present)
Month	Jan	Feb	Mar	Apr	May	Jun	Jul	Aug	Sep	Oct	Nov	Dec	Year
Record high °C (°F)	44.0 (111.2)	44.8 (112.6)	42.0 (107.6)	39.2 (102.6)	37.6 (99.7)	40.0 (104.0)	39.2 (102.6)	38.4 (101.1)	40.0 (104.0)	41.5 (106.7)	42.5 (108.5)	43.5 (110.3)	44.8 (112.6)
Mean daily maximum °C (°F)	33.8 (92.8)	32.5 (90.5)	31.0 (87.8)	27.2 (81.0)	22.6 (72.7)	20.3 (68.5)	20.0 (68.0)	23.6 (74.5)	26.5 (79.7)	30.2 (86.4)	32.6 (90.7)	34.2 (93.6)	27.9 (82.2)
Daily mean °C (°F)	25.9 (78.6)	24.7 (76.5)	22.9 (73.2)	18.8 (65.8)	14.0 (57.2)	11.0 (51.8)	10.2 (50.4)	13.7 (56.7)	17.2 (63.0)	21.5 (70.7)	24.2 (75.6)	26.2 (79.2)	19.2 (66.6)
Mean daily minimum °C (°F)	18.9 (66.0)	17.6 (63.7)	15.7 (60.3)	10.5 (50.9)	5.1 (41.2)	1.4 (34.5)	0.2 (32.4)	2.7 (36.9)	6.5 (43.7)	11.4 (52.5)	15.3 (59.5)	18.0 (64.4)	10.3 (50.5)
Record low °C (°F)	6.1 (43.0)	4.4 (39.9)	2.2 (36.0)	−2.6 (27.3)	−6.5 (20.3)	−9.7 (14.5)	−10.6 (12.9)	−9.9 (14.2)	−6.3 (20.7)	0.0 (32.0)	2.4 (36.3)	5.3 (41.5)	−10.6 (12.9)
Average precipitation mm (inches)	37.4 (1.47)	27.0 (1.06)	17.9 (0.70)	6.2 (0.24)	3.1 (0.12)	2.5 (0.10)	2.0 (0.08)	1.2 (0.05)	1.5 (0.06)	4.9 (0.19)	8.0 (0.31)	21.3 (0.84)	133.0 (5.24)
Average precipitation days (≥ 0.1 mm)	6.0	4.8	3.5	1.2	0.9	0.6	0.7	0.4	0.6	1.0	1.1	3.3	23.9
Average snowy days	0.0	0.0	0.0	0.0	0.0	0.1	0.3	0.1	0.1	0.0	0.0	0.0	0.6
Average relative humidity (%)	55.5	58.2	59.9	61.1	62.7	57.8	53.8	46.0	45.2	46.3	48.1	49.5	53.7
Source: Servicio Meteorológico Nacional
