= La Paz, Entre Ríos =

La Paz
- City
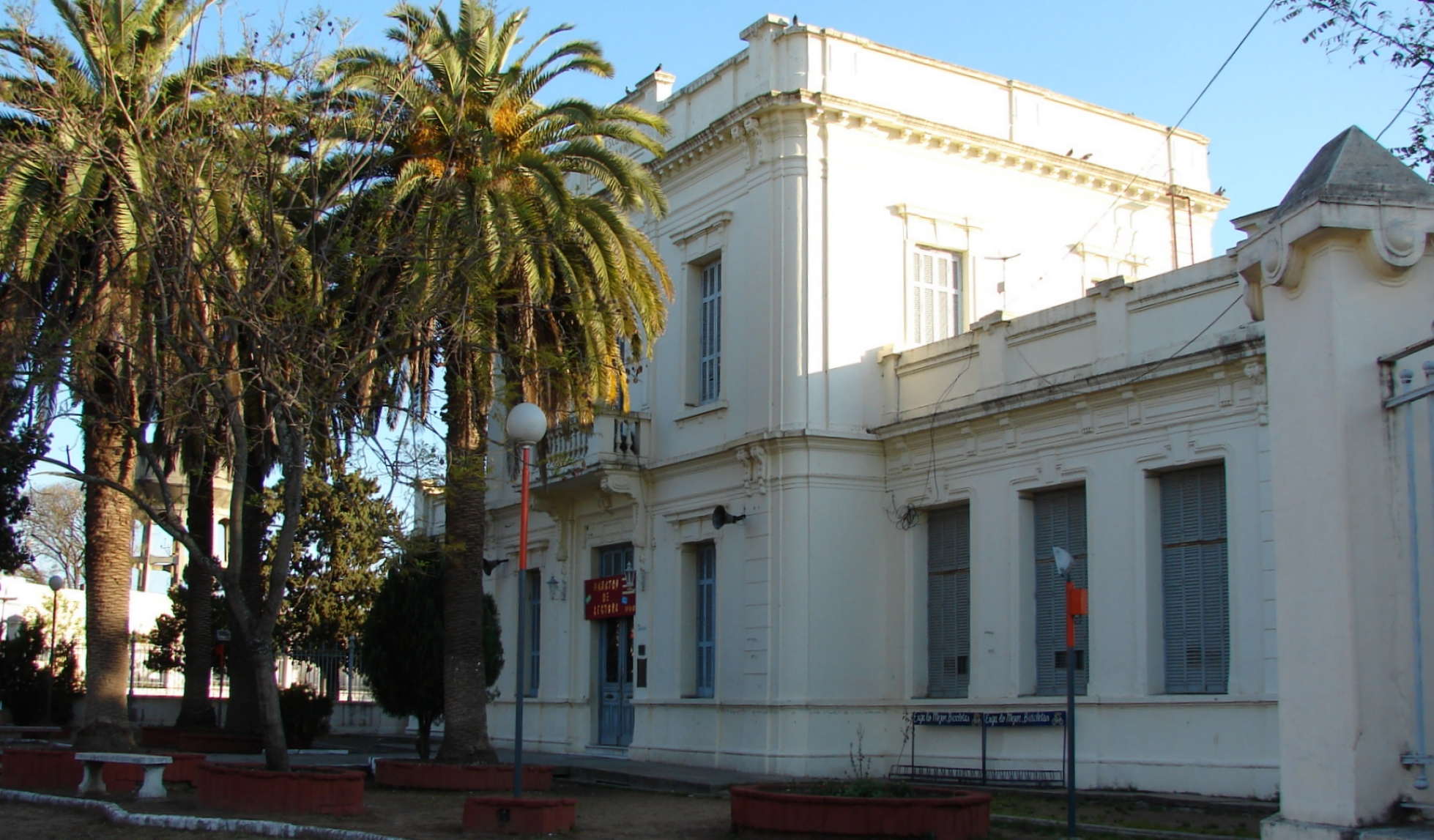

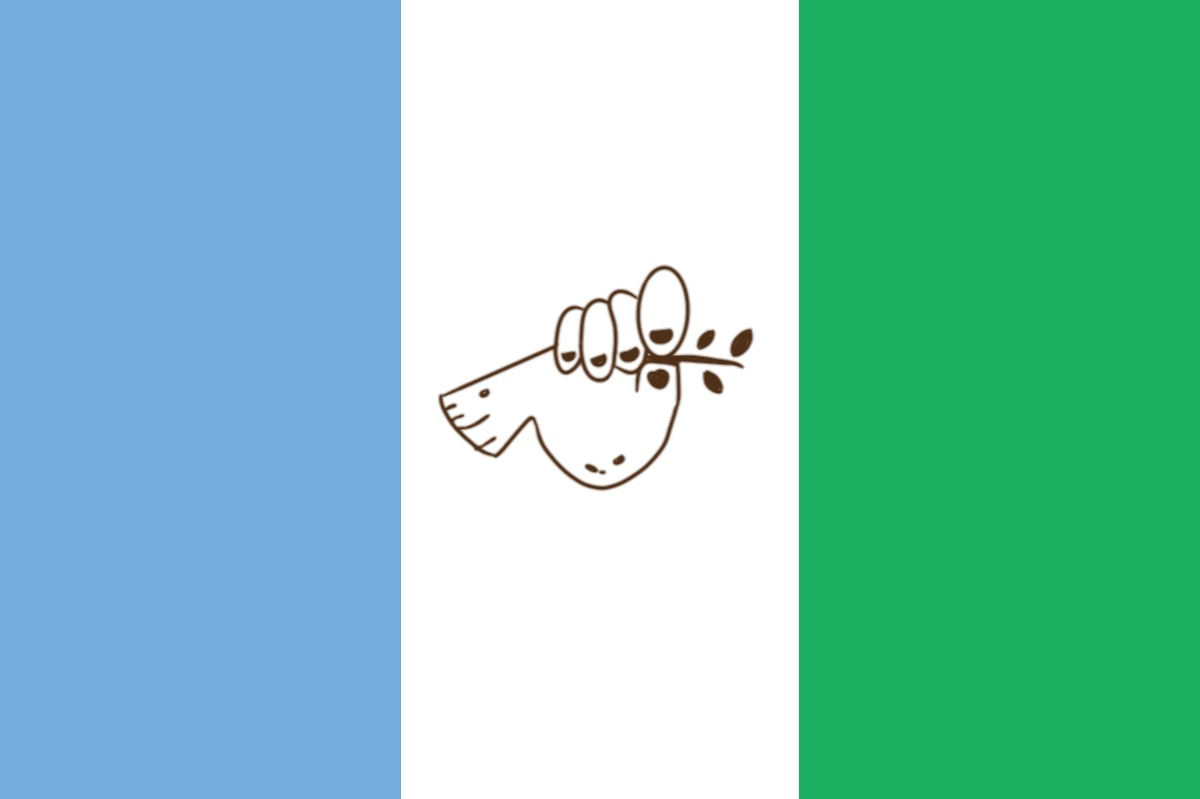
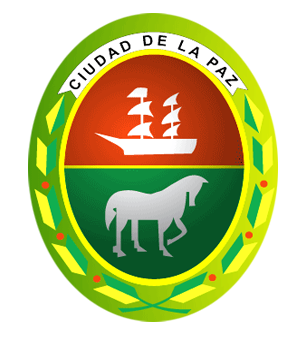
- Flag Coat of arms

- Location of La Paz in Argentina
- Coordinates: 30°45′S 59°39′W
- Country: Argentina
- Province: Entre Ríos
- Department: La Paz
- Founded: July 13, 1835

Government
  - Mayor: Bruno Sarubi (Juntos por el Cambio)

Area
  - Total: 119 km^{2} (46 sq mi)
- Elevation: 55 m (180 ft)

Population (2010)
  - Total: 24,307
  - Density: 204/km^{2} (529/sq mi)
- Time zone: UTC−3 (ART)
- CPA base: E3190
- Dialing code: +54 3437
- Website: Official website

La Paz is a city in the province of Entre Ríos in the Argentine Mesopotamia. It has about 24,000 inhabitants as per the 2010 census [INDEC], and is the head town of the department of the same name.

The city lies in the north-west of the province, on the left-hand (eastern) shore of the Paraná River. It was already settled in the 18th century as a natural port, appearing in maps of the time as Cabayú Cuatiá (the name of a stream that empties into the Paraná at this point). It formally became a city on 1 January 1873.

Like other cities in the area, La Paz has a hot springs complex and takes touristic advantage of its river beaches and the possibility of excellent sport fishing, with access to the Curuzú Chalí Provincial Fish Reserve.
