= Sierra Grande, Río Negro =

Sierra Grande
- City and municipality
- Location within Argentina
- Coordinates: 41°36′S 65°21′W
- Country: Argentina
- Province: Río Negro
- Department: San Antonio
- Established: 19 October 1903

Population (2010 census)
  - Total: 7,641
- Time zone: UTC−3 (ART)
- Climate: Cfc

Sierra Grande is a city and municipality in the San Antonio Department of Río Negro Province in Argentina. It was founded in 1903, and as of the 2010 census [INDEC] it counted with a population of 7,641.

The lands where the city now stands was once Tehuelche territory. The first white settlers came from Viedma and Carmen de Patagones; they established a small settlement with the name of Sierra Vieja, later renamed as Colonia Chilavert. On 19 October 1903, the first juez de paz took seat in the settlement, and this is now celebrated as the town's foundational moment. The discovery of iron ore in the region led to the town's growth in the 1940s.
