= Displaced threshold =

Aviation term

A displaced threshold or DTHR is a runway threshold located at a point other than the physical beginning or end of the runway.

The displaced threshold is the wide white line across the runway, indicated by white arrows leading up to it. The area behind a displaced threshold can be used for taxiing and taking off in either direction, as well as for landings from the opposite direction.

The portion of the runway behind a displaced threshold may be used for takeoff in either direction and landings from the opposite direction. After landing at the other end, the landing aircraft may use the area behind the displaced threshold for roll out.

Most often, the offset threshold is in place to give arriving aircraft clearance over an obstruction, while still allowing departing aircraft the maximum amount of runway available. A displaced threshold may also be introduced as a noise mitigation measure for the communities overflown on approach, or if a beginning section of the runway is no longer able to sustain the continuous impact from landing aircraft. Aircraft are expected to land beyond the displaced threshold. Departing aircraft are permitted to use the section of the runway behind a displaced threshold for takeoffs or landing rollouts from the opposite direction even if the reason for the displacement is lowered pavement resistance, because those aircraft are not impacting the runway with the force of a landing aircraft.

A portion of the runway behind a displaced threshold has three markings:

- White arrows along the center line of the runway
- White arrow heads across the width of the runway just prior to the displaced threshold bar
- A 3.0 m (10 ft) wide white threshold bar across the width of the runway at the displaced threshold

Runway 29L at Indira Gandhi International Airport, in Delhi, India, has a displaced threshold of 1,460 m (4,790 ft) from the physical beginning of the pavement. This produces a 1,500 m (4,900 ft) portion of runway that cannot be used for landing in this direction. This, in turn decreases the available landing length on runway 29L to 2,970 m (9,740 ft). This is because aircraft coming in to land need to avoid the Shiva statue, which is located near runway 29L.

Runway 22R at John F. Kennedy International Airport has a displaced threshold due to noise abatement. This shortens the landing distance available to just 2,376 m (7,795 ft) for the 3,682 m (12,079 ft) runway.
