= Transport in Argentina =

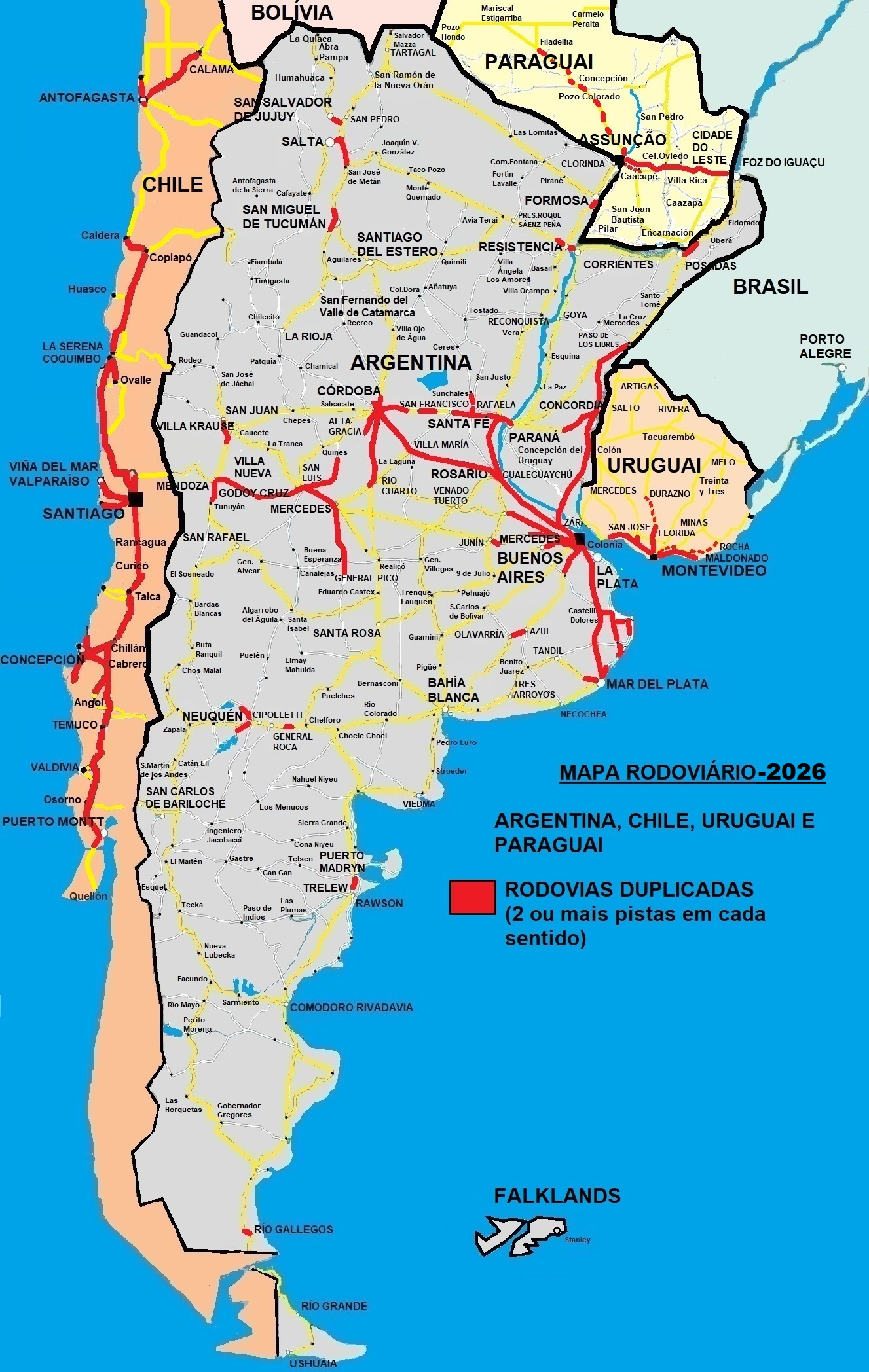
Road system in South America, with divided highways highlighted in red.

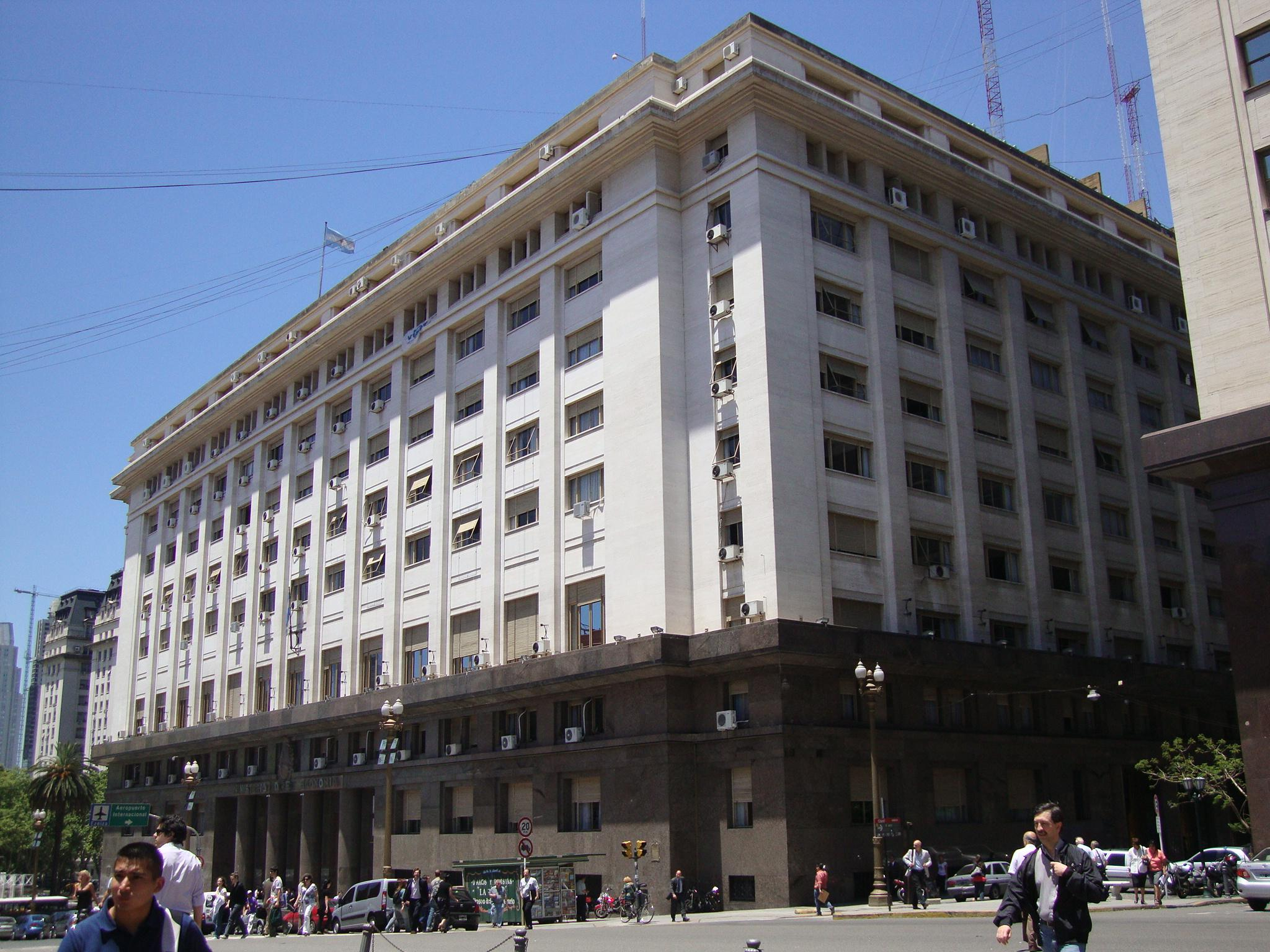
Headquarters of the Secretariat of Transport in Buenos Aires

Transport in Argentina is mainly based on a complex network of routes, crossed by relatively inexpensive long-distance buses and by cargo trucks. The country also has a number of national and international airports. The importance of the long-distance train is minor today, though in the past it was widely used and is now regaining momentum after the re-nationalisation of the country's commuter and freight networks. Fluvial transport is mostly used for cargo.

Within the urban areas, the main transportation system is by the bus or colectivo; bus lines transport millions of people every day in the larger cities and their metropolitan areas as well as a bus rapid transport system known as Metrobus. Buenos Aires additionally has an underground, the only one in the country, and Greater Buenos Aires is serviced by a system of suburban trains.

== Public transportation ==
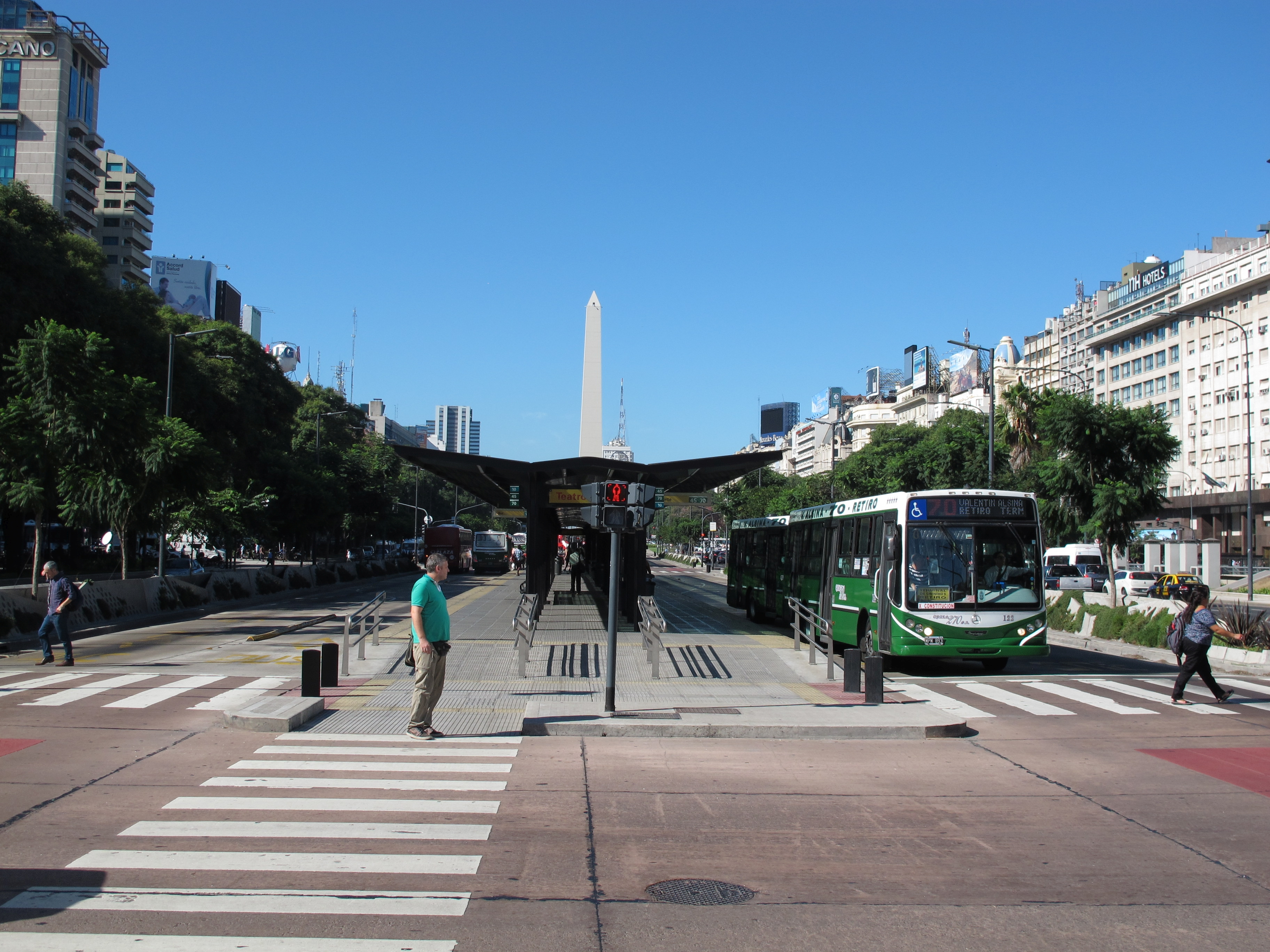
A Metrobus 9 de Julio station in central Buenos Aires.

A majority of people use public transport rather than personal cars to move around in the cities, especially in common business hours, since parking can be both difficult and expensive. Cycling is becoming increasingly common in big cities as a result of a growing network of cycling lanes in cities like Buenos Aires and Rosario.

=== Bus ===
The Colectivo (urban bus) cover the cities with numerous lines. Fares might be fixed for the whole city, or they might depend on the destination. Colectivos often cross municipal borders into the corresponding metropolitan areas. In some cases there are diferenciales (special services) which are faster, and notably more expensive. Bus lines in a given city might be run by different private companies and/or by the municipal state, and they might be painted in different colours for easier identification. The city of Buenos Aires has in recent years been expanding its Metrobus BRT system to complement its existing Underground network and it is estimated that, along with other measures, it will increase the city's use of public transport by 30 percent.

=== Taxi ===
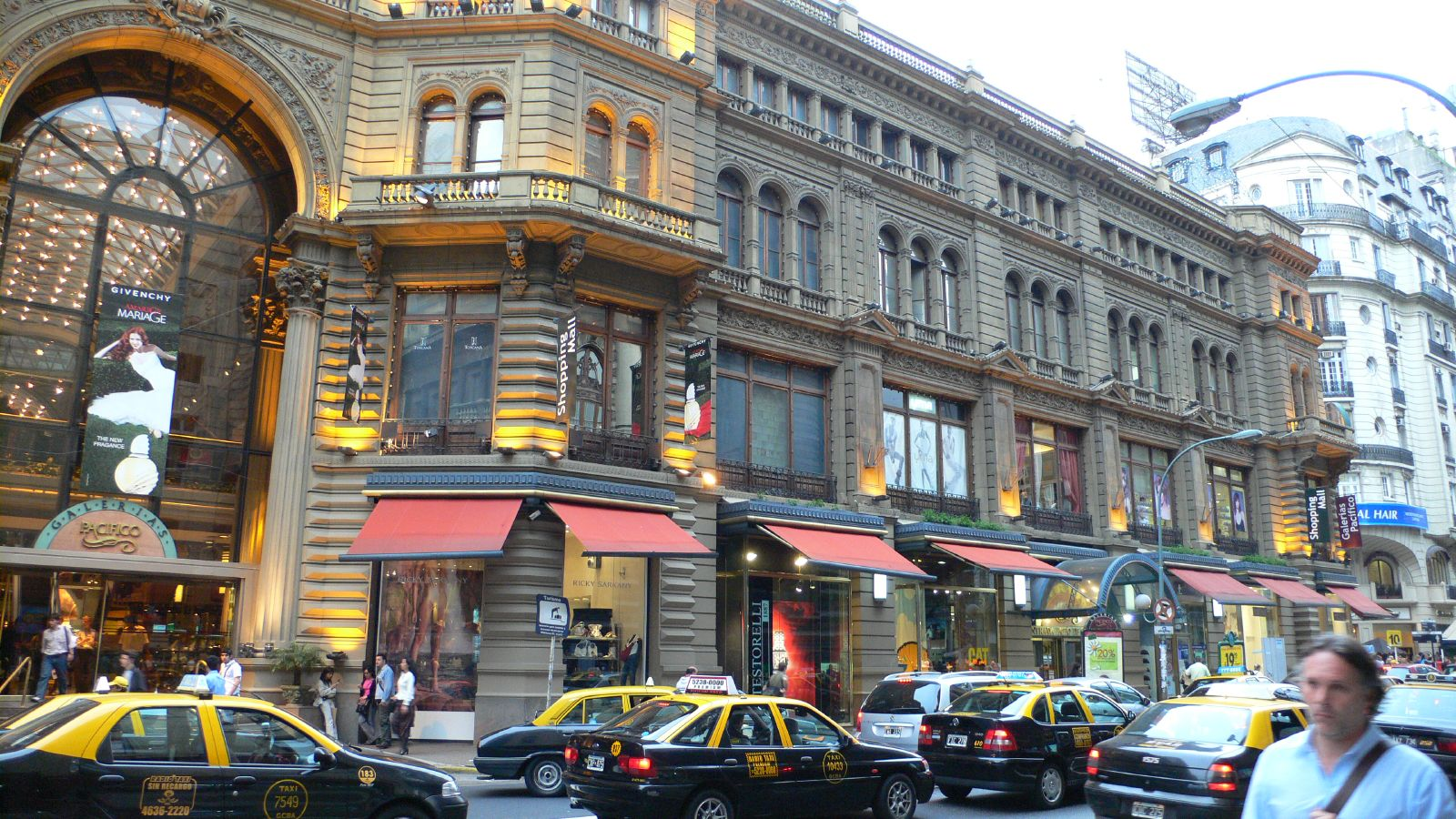
Taxis are plentiful in all the larger cities.

Taxis are very common and relatively accessible price-wise. They have different colours and fares in different cities, though a highly contrasted black-and-yellow design is common to the largest conurbations. Call-taxi companies (radio-taxis) are very common, while the remisse is another form of hired transport: they are very much like call-taxis, but do not share a common design, and trip fares are agreed beforehand instead of using the meter. Although, there are often fixed prices for common destinations.

=== Commuter rail ===
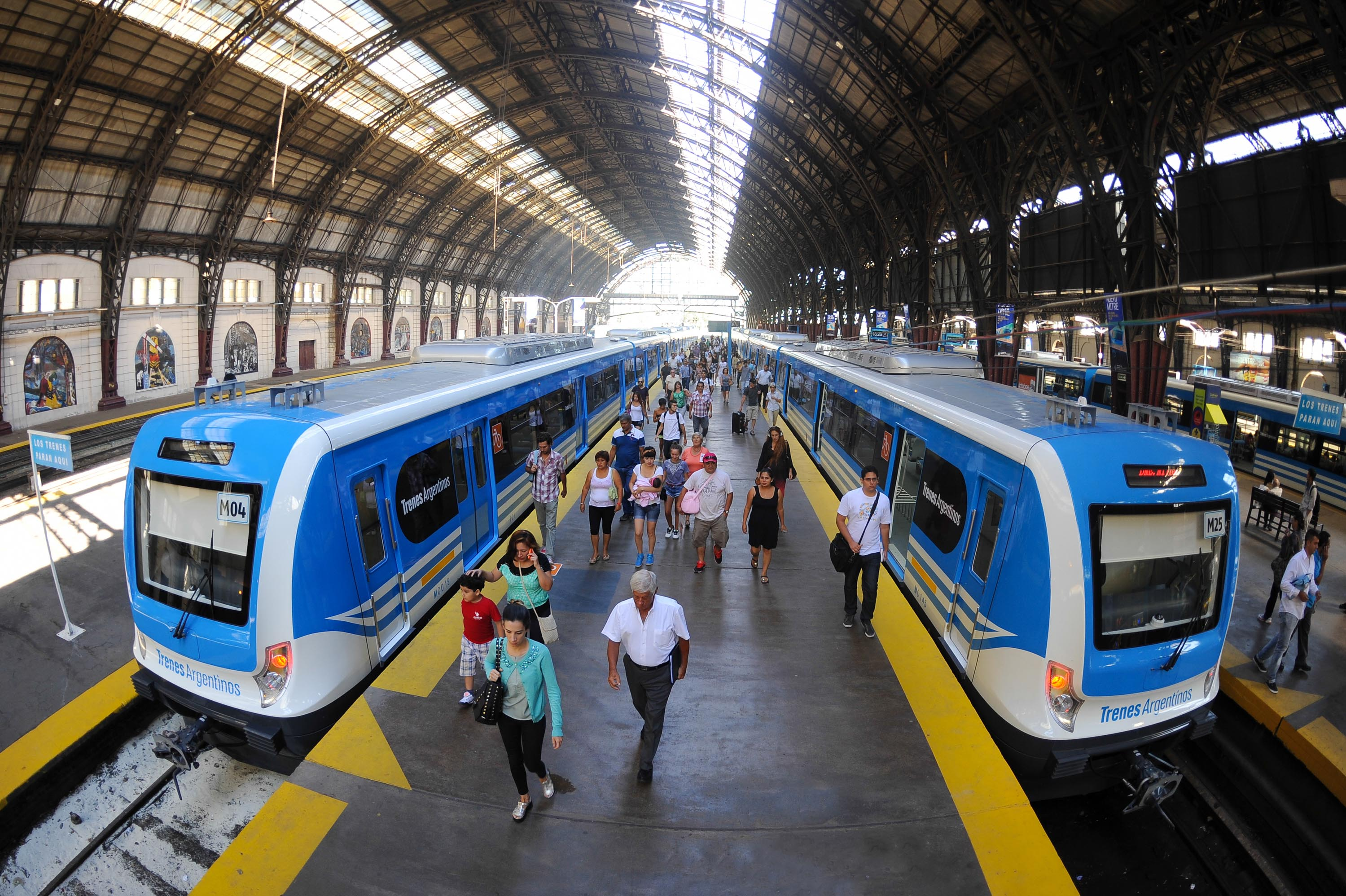
CSR trains operated by Trenes Argentinos at Retiro railway station.

Suburban trains connect Buenos Aires city with the Greater Buenos Aires area, (see: Buenos Aires commuter rail network). Every weekday, more than 1.4 million people commute to the Argentine capital for work and other business. These suburban trains work between 4 AM and 1 AM. The busiest lines are electric, several are diesel powered, while some of these are currently being electrified, while the rolling stock is being replaced across the city. Until recently, Trenes de Buenos Aires, UGOFE, Ferrovías and Metrovías were some of the private companies which provided suburban passenger services in the Buenos Aires metropolitan area. However, with the modernisation and re-nationalisation of these services, many of these companies have had their contracts terminated or have been absorbed into Trenes Argentinos (the state railway operator), though as of 2015 some private operators such as Metrovías (Urquiza Line) do remain.

Other cities in Argentina with a system of suburban trains include Resistencia, Paraná and Mendoza, which is home to the Metrotranvía Mendoza - an urban light rail network. A commuter rail network for Córdoba is planned to complement the existing Tren de las Sierras which currently runs through the city and to nearby towns and villages.

=== Underground Subway ===
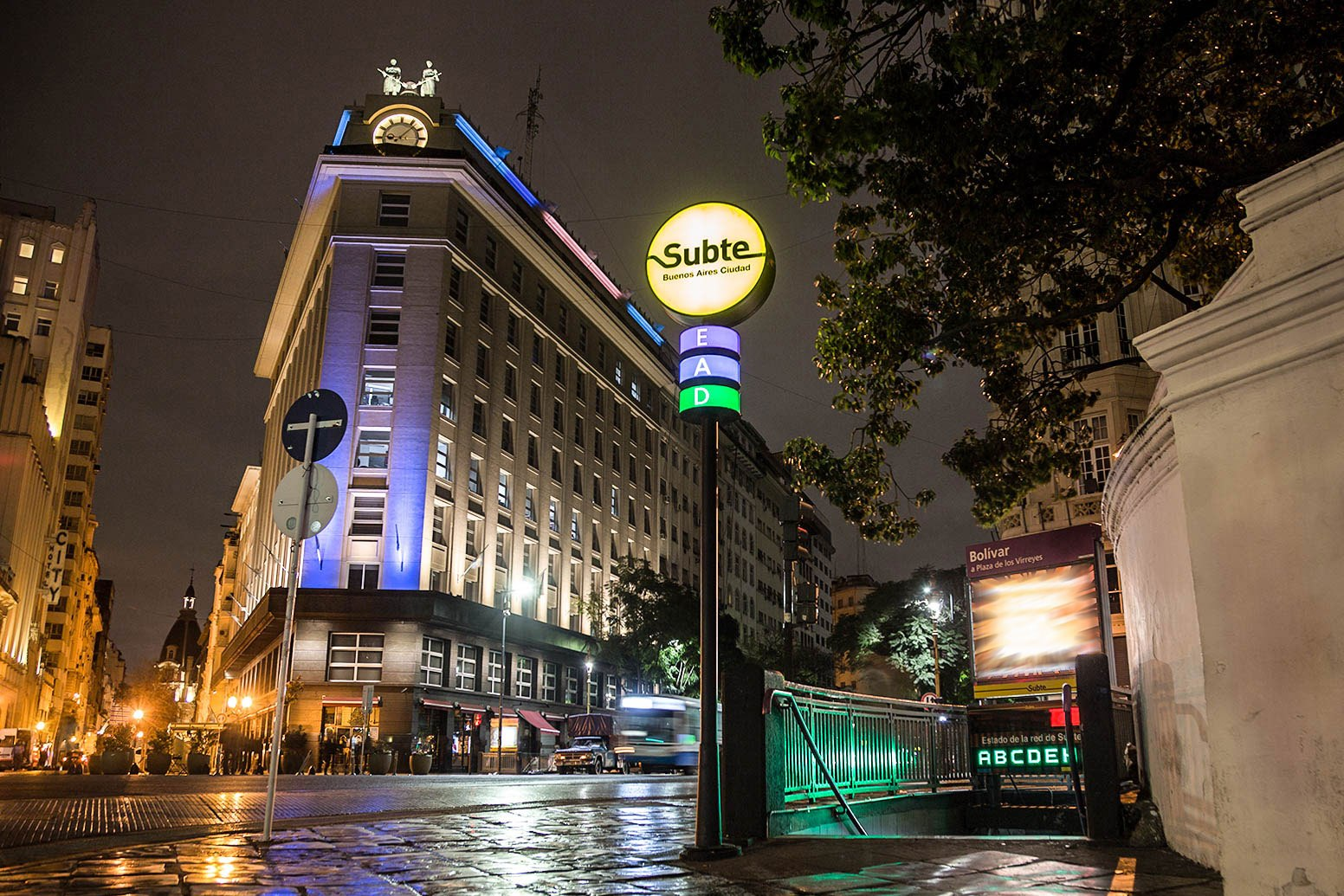
Entrance to a Buenos Aires Underground station.

As of 2015, Buenos Aires is the only Argentine city with an underground metro system, nonetheless there is a project to build a system in the city of Córdoba (Córdoba Metro) making it the second underground system in Argentina. The Buenos Aires Underground (Subterráneo de Buenos Aires) has currently six lines, each labelled with a letter from A to H, though 3 more lines are planned. A modern tram line (PreMetro) line E2 works as a feeder to Underground Line E at their outer terminus as well as the Urquiza Line for Underground Line B in Chacarita. Daily ridership is 1.3 million and on the increase. Most of the lines of the Buenos Aires Undergrounds connect the city centre (Micro-centro) with areas in the outskirts of the city proper, though none go outside the city limits to Greater Buenos Aires.

In recent years, the Underground has seen a gradual expansion, with lines H, B and A seeing extensions. As of 2015, the extension of lines E and H are under construction, with work commenced on the new line F and two additional lines (G and I) planned. Similarly, the rolling stock has been gradually replaced in recent years and there are further plans to modernise.

=== Tram ===
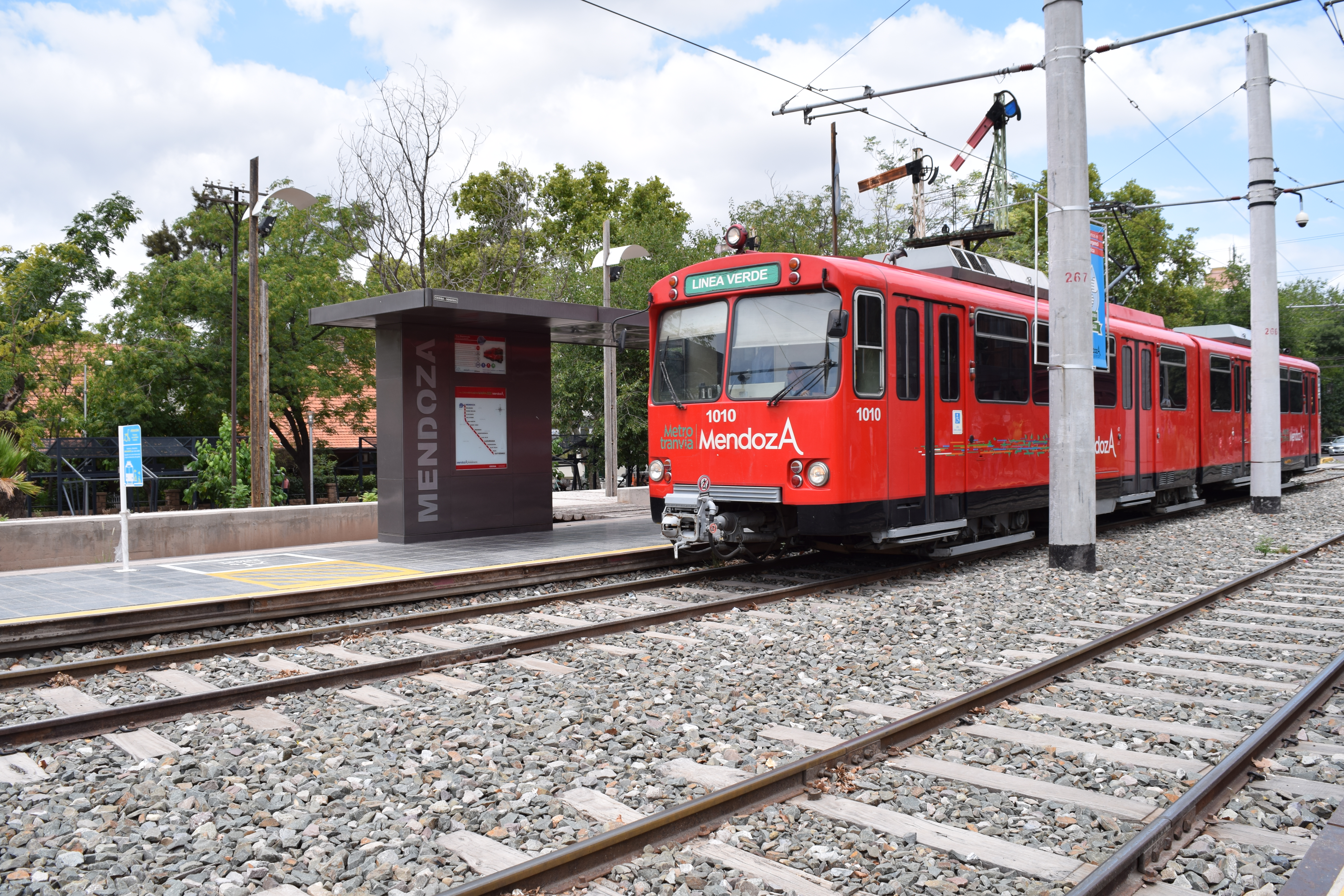
A tram in Mendoza

Trams (streetcars), once common, were retired as a form of public transport in the 1960s but are now in the stages of a slow comeback. In 1987 a modern tram line was opened as a feeder for the underground system. A modern light rail line between the Bartolomé Mitre suburban railway station and Tigre (Tren de la Costa) inaugurated in 1996 operates in the northern suburbs. A 2-kilometre tram known as the Tranvía del Este (Eastern Tram) was inaugurated 2007 in the Puerto Madero district of Buenos Aires using loaned French Alstom Citadis trams, but plans for its extension never came to fruition, and declining patronage led the line's closure in 2012.

Trams were once extremely common in Buenos Aires, with the city having a large 875 km tramway network and the largest tramway-to-population ratio the world, which gained it notoriety as "the city of trams" across the world. The first trams began operating in the 1860s, however by the 1960s the network was dismantled and replaced by buses. There is a Heritage Tramway maintained by enthusiasts that operates a large collection of vintage trams on weekends, near the Primera Junta Underground Line A station in the Caballito neighbourhood.

The city of Mendoza also has its own tram system called the Metrotranvía Mendoza which has 16 stations and connects the city with its conurbation. Other Argentine cities with tram systems are Paraná and La Plata, both using the nationally built TecnoTren railbuses. The city of Santiago del Estero is constructing an elevated light rail system to connect itself with its metropolitan area. Trolleybuses are operated in Córdoba, Mendoza and Rosario.

== Road transport ==
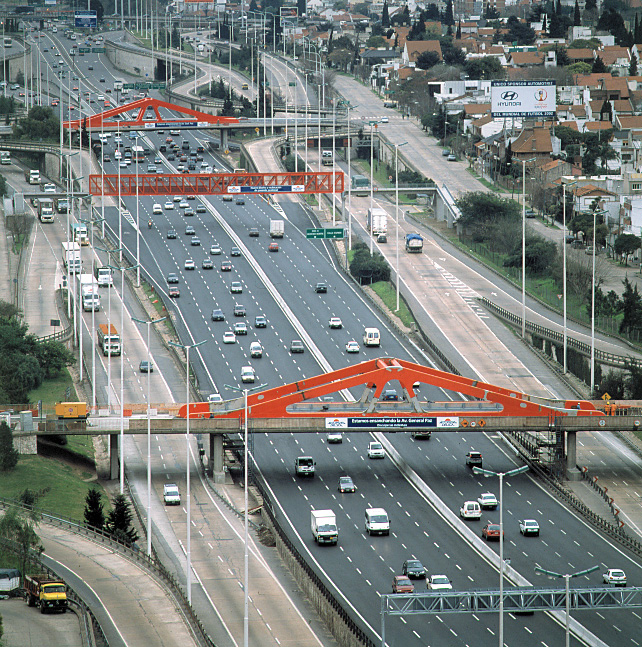
The Avenida General Paz beltway freeway was first opened to the public in 1941.

Since Argentina is almost 4,000 kilometres long and more than 1,000 km wide, long distance transportation is of great importance. Several toll expressways spread out from Buenos Aires, serving nearly half the nation's population. The majority of Argentine roads, however, are two-lane national and provincial routes and, though they are spread throughout the country, less than a third of Argentina's 230,000 km (145,000 mi) of roads are currently paved.

Though, by 1929, Argentina was already home to over 400,000 vehicles, virtually all long-distance travel was done on the nation's vast railways. Argentina, then, lacked a road-building program until 1932, when the National Highway Directorate was established. Paid for at first with an excise tax on gasoline, the bureau could claim some important accomplishments, like the 1951 opening of the 200 km Santa Fe-Rosario expressway.

Argentina is home to around 9.2 million registered cars, trucks and buses; on a per capita basis, it has long had Latin America's widest accessibility to motor vehicles. Left-lane drivers until 1945, Argentine motorists have since been driving on the right-hand side. The Vehicle registration plates of Argentina are based on a three letters-three numbers per car (with the exception of some trucks) system.

Expressways have been recently doubled in length (to nearly) and now link most (though not all) important cities. The most important of these is probably the Panamerican National Route 9 Buenos Aires – Rosario – Córdoba freeway. The longest continuous highways are National Route 40, a 5000-km stretch along the Andes range and the 3000-km sea-side trunk road National Route 3, running from Buenos Aires to Ushuaia.

=== Long distance buses ===
Argentine long distance buses are fast, affordable and comfortable; they have become the primary means of long-distance travel since railway privatisations in the early 1990s greatly downsized Argentina's passenger rail service and plane tickets are more expensive. Competing providers differ little on their time-honoured formula, offering three different services regarding the number of stops and type of seats: the Regular, Semi-cama (semi-bed), and Cama (bed), with Cama being similar to an airline's business class but the names vary. They may also be called Ejecutivo, Cama-vip, Cama-suite and some other names. Some services, usually the ones that are more expensive, have also on-board dining, while others stop at restaurants by the road. Long and middle-distance buses cover almost all paved-accessible cities, towns and villages.

== Rail transport ==
=== Long-distance passenger services ===
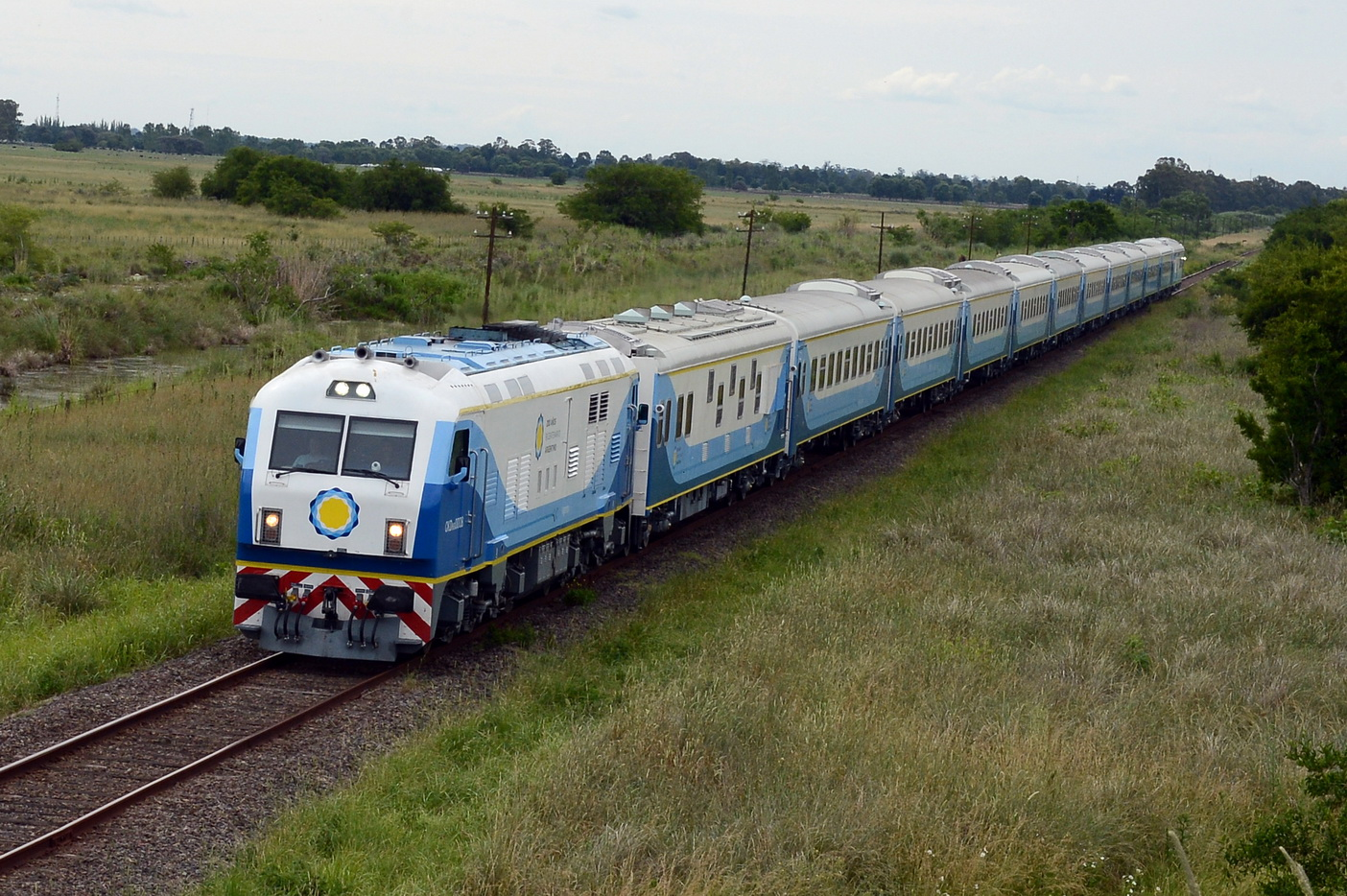
One of the new long-distance CNR CKD8 locomotives which began operation in 2014.

Services on Argentina's passenger railway system, once extensive and prosperous, were greatly reduced in 1993 following the break-up of Ferrocarriles Argentinos (FA), the state railway corporation. Despite the decline of the railway under privatisation, Argentina still maintains the 8th largest rail network in the world, with 36,966 km of track.

Following the break-up, however, several private and provincial railway companies had been created and resurrected some of the major passenger trains that FA once operated, albeit with far more limited services than under state administration. Trenes de Buenos Aires, Ferrocentral, Ferrobaires, and Tren Patagónico were some of the private companies that managed Argentina's long distance passenger rail network in this period.

More recently, the government has begun nationalising some of these private companies or simply not renewing their contracts, while at the same time, the state-owned Trenes Argentinos began re-opening services and improving on the once private services using completely new rolling stock, including services from Buenos Aires to Mar del Plata and Buenos Aires-Rosario-Cordoba. In many cases, the Argentine Government has completely replaced, or is in the process of replacing, the existing infrastructure with continuous welded rails on concrete sleepers.

The national government's official stance on rail transport is to re-open all lines that ceased operation following the privatisation in the 1990s. In April 2015, by overwhelming majority the Argentine Senate passed a law which re-created Ferrocarriles Argentinos as Nuevos Ferrocarriles Argentinos, effectively re-nationalising the country's railways, a move which saw support from all political parties on both sides of the political spectrum.

=== High-speed rail ===
A high-speed rail line between Buenos Aires, Rosario and Córdoba with speeds up to 320 km/h is in the design stages. Construction was supposed to begin by early 2009 for the first segment to Rosario.

In 2007 bids were called for a turnkey contract for a second high speed line, linking Buenos Aires and Mendoza.

In February 2008 national government announced another call for bid, this time for construction of a high speed train linking Buenos Aires and Mar del Plata; The Mar del Plata TAVe. As of 2015, the project remains suspended.

=== Freight service ===
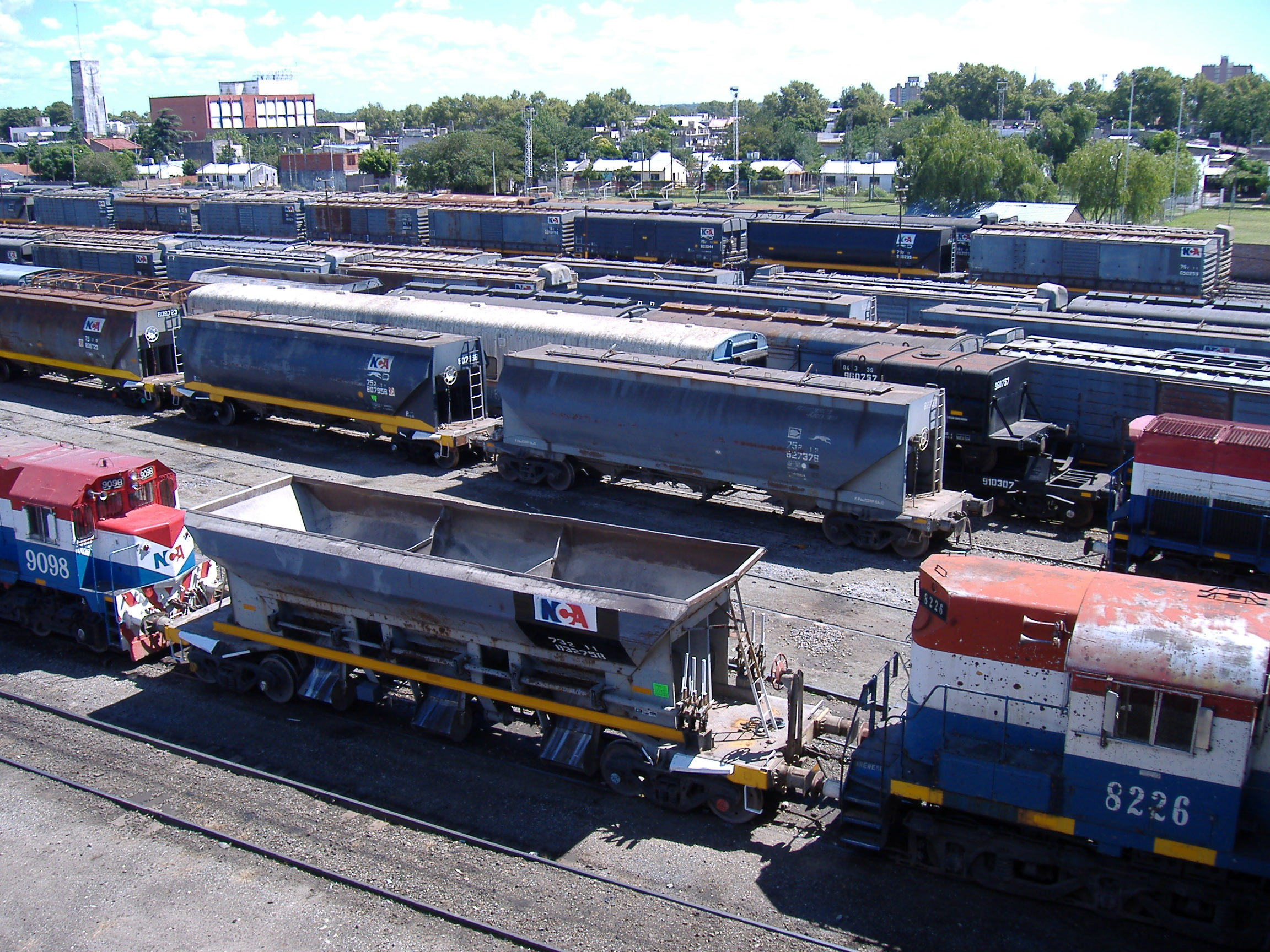
Nuevo Central Argentino freight trains in Rosario.

Over 25 million tonnes of freight were transported by rail in 2007. Currently, five carriers operate freight rail services in Argentina:

- Nuevo Central Argentino
- Ferroexpreso Pampeano
- Ferrosur Roca
- América Latina Logística
- Belgrano Cargas (Now owned by the Argentine Government under Ferrocarriles Argentinos (2015))

The government began refurbishing and investing heavily in the country's freight network from 2014, beginning with the re-nationalisation of the Belgrano Cargas freight operator. Further investment of US$2.5 billion has been agreed with China in an effort to improve freight capacity throughout Argentina and refurbish ageing track segments. Through this investment, the government ordered 1000 freight wagons from Argentine state-owned company Fabricaciones Militares, while the deal with China included the purchase of 100 locomotives and 3,500 carriages from the country. This investment was doubled to US$4.8 billion in September 2015.

A map of the existing freight network in Argentina (as of 2014) can be found here .

=== Tourist railways ===
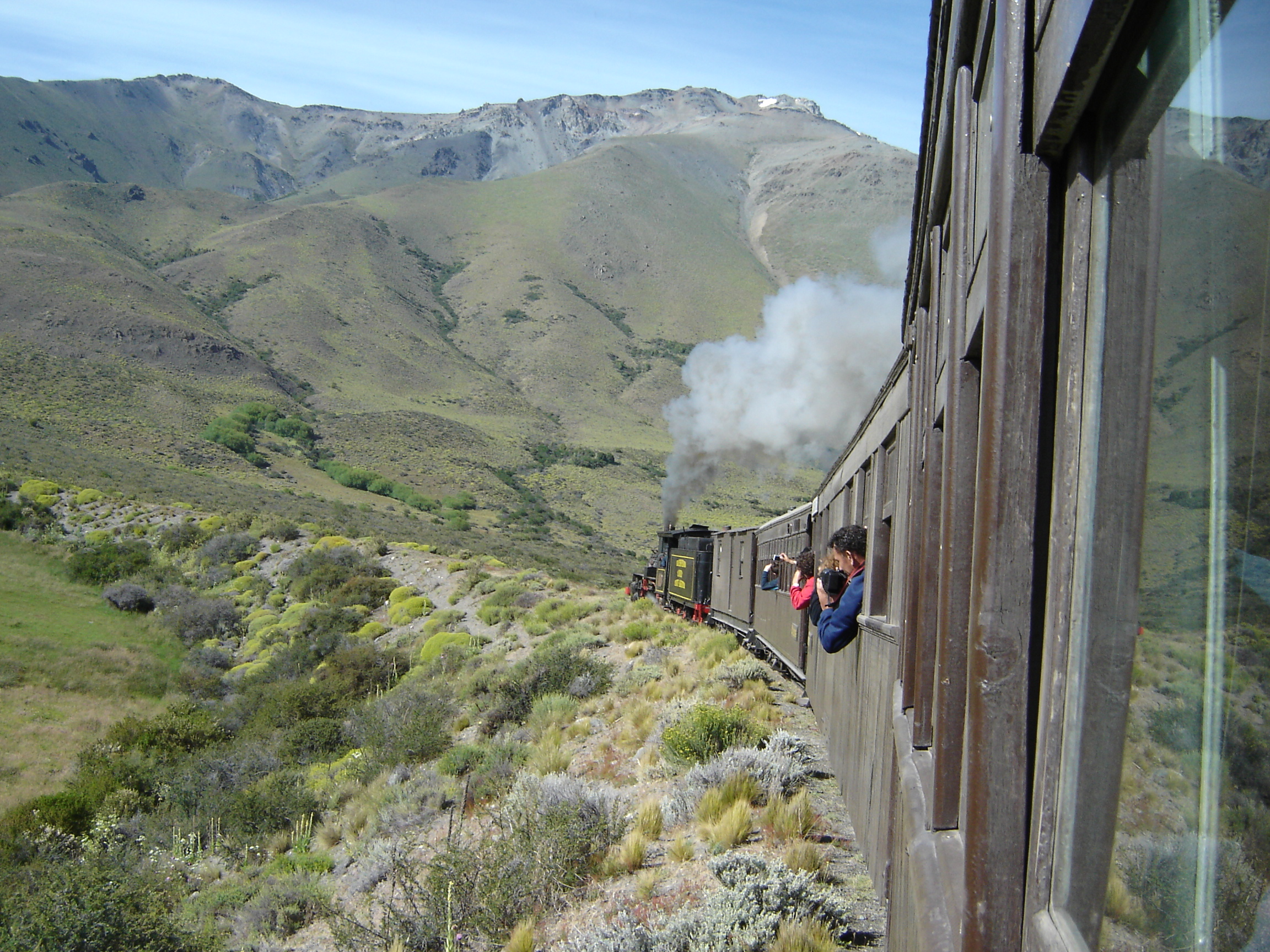
View from the Old Patagonian Express.

A number of steam powered heritage railways (tourist trains) are in operation; the Old Patagonian Express (locally known as "La Trochita") in Patagonia, the Train of the End of the World (Southern Fuegian Railway) in Ushuaia, Tierra del Fuego and a short run Tren Histórico de Bariloche.

A diesel-electric Tren a las Nubes in the province of Salta runs from the city of Salta to San Antonio de los Cobres. The national government had closed the line after nationalising it in order to restore the tracks, however it returned to service in March, 2015 with refurbished rolling stock and rails under the operation of Trenes Argentinos.

The Tren de las Sierras, as well as linking together parts of the centre of the city of Córdoba, also functions as a tourist railway along the Sierras de Córdoba foothills.

=== International rail links to adjacent countries ===
- Bolivia - 1,000 mm (3 ft 3 3/8 in) gauge both countries. Two rail connections between (Villazón, Bolivia - La Quiaca, Argentina) and (Yacuiba, Bolivia - Salvador Mazza, Argentina).
- Brazil - break of gauge, 1,435 mm (4 ft 8 1/2 in) gauge in Argentina and 1,000 mm (3 ft 3 3/8 in) gauge in Brazil. Bridge over Uruguay River linking Paso de los Libres (Argentina) and Uruguaiana (Brazil).
- Chile - South Trans-Andean Railway link between Zapala, Argentina and Lonquimay, Chile. 1,676 mm (5 ft 6 in) gauge in both countries.
- Chile - Transandine Railway between Mendoza and Santa Rosa de Los Andes, now defunct, but under reconstruction. This mountain railway of 1,000 mm (3 ft 3 3/8 in) gauge with rack railway sections had a break of gauge 5 ft 6 in (1,676 mm)/1,000 mm (3 ft 3 3/8 in) at either end.
- Chile - Salta–Antofagasta railway, single 1,000 mm (3 ft 3 3/8 in) gauge linking Salta to Antofagasta. The Tren a las Nubes is a tourist service running for 217 km on the Argentine side.
- Paraguay - Posadas-Encarnación 1,435 mm (4 ft 8 1/2 in) gauge both countries, service began in 2014.
- Uruguay - Tren de los Pueblos Libres 1,435 mm (4 ft 8 1/2 in) in both countries, a short-lived service made to re-open the once closed link. It ceased operation after all concessions to the private company TBA were revoked following the Once Tragedy.

==== New International link proposed ====
A modern railway connection in order to replace the now-defunct Transandine Railway between Argentina and Chile has been proposed and is currently in the planning stages with support from an international consortium of companies. The rail link will carry both passengers and freight through the Andes, linking the cities of Buenos Aires and Santiago de Chile. The link would also service Argentina's vast oil fields.

== Air travel ==
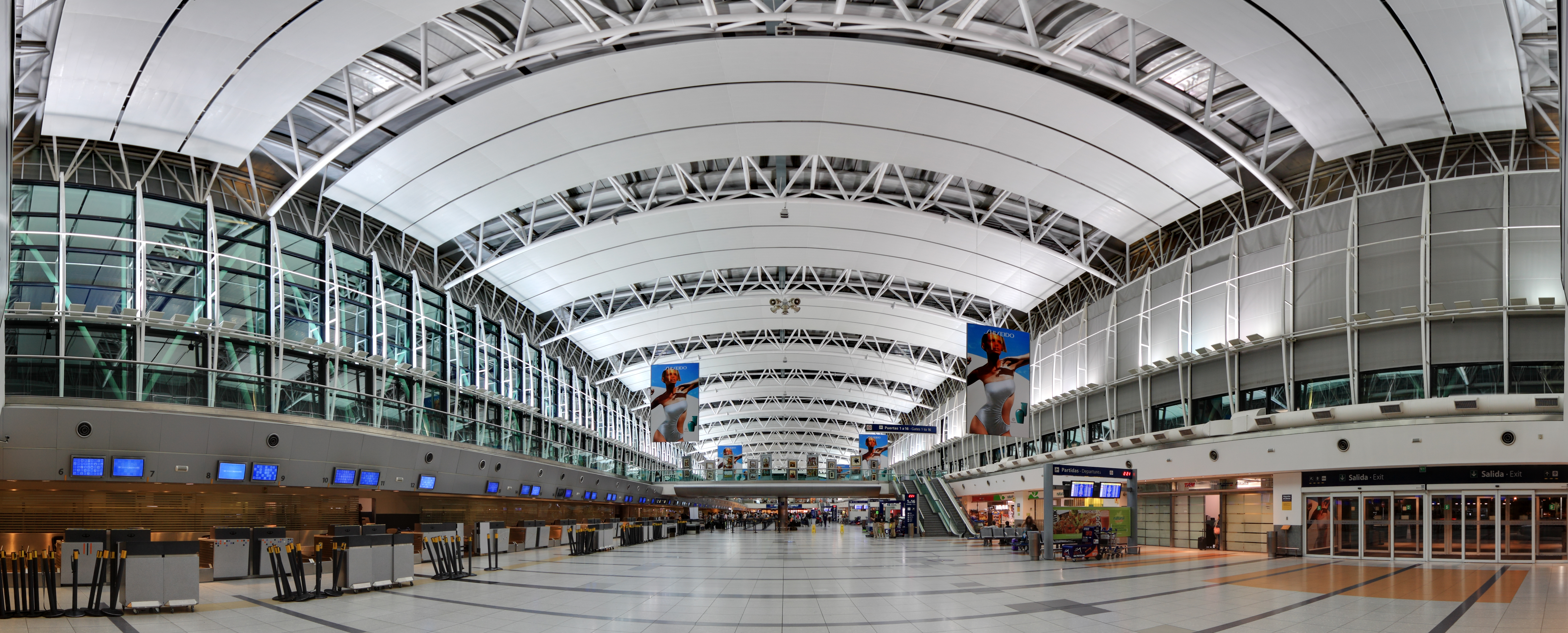
Buenos Aires's Ministro Pistarini International Airport.

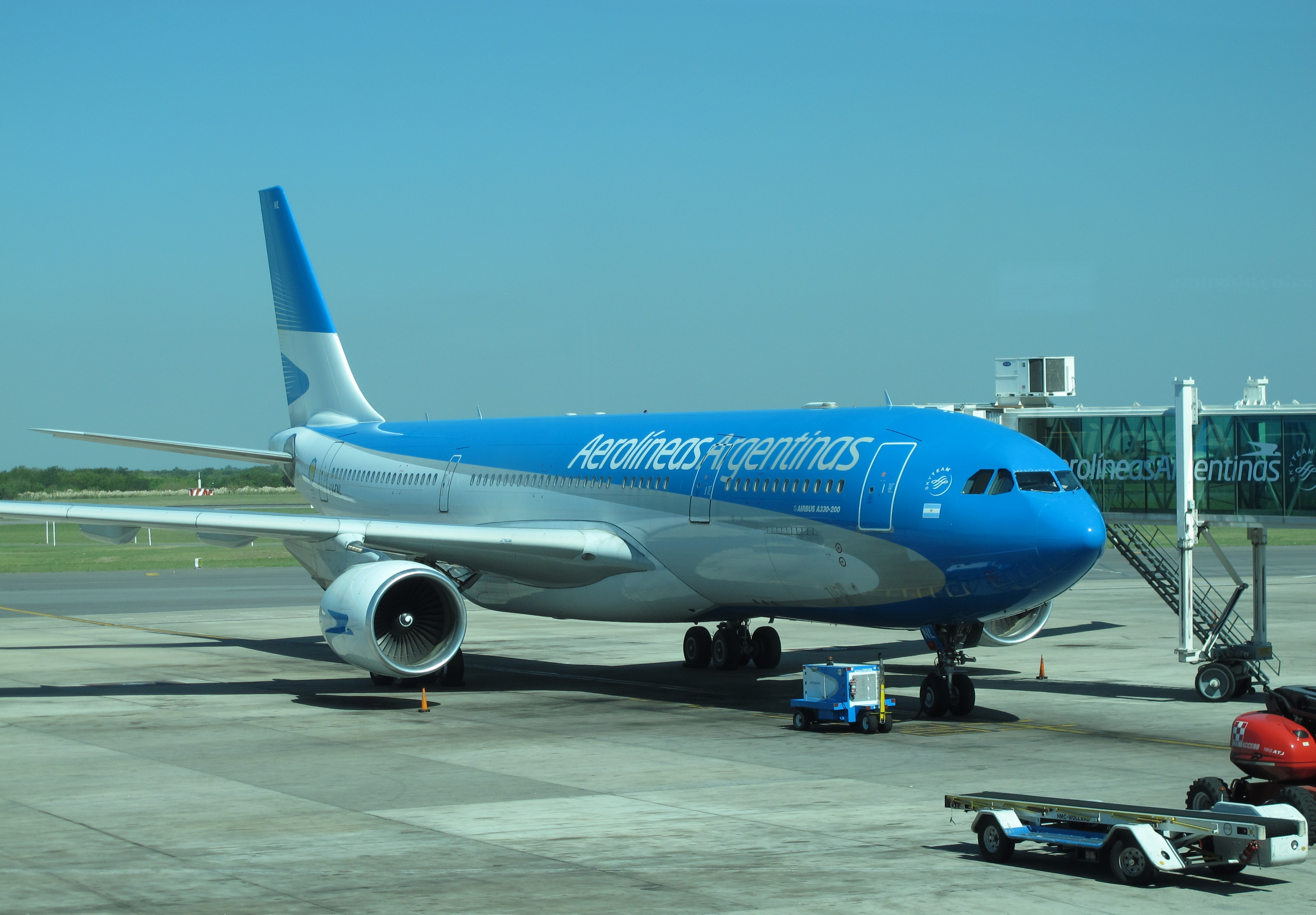
An Aerolíneas Argentinas A330 at Ezeiza.

Though traditionally more expensive when compared with the other means of transportation, air travel is becoming increasingly common due to more competitive prices. Every provincial capital has its own airport, and there are many others, particularly in tourist areas such as Bariloche and El Calafate (see list of airports in Argentina). Most companies have several daily flights to the most popular destinations, and daily or less frequent flights to other destinations. Since 2003, the Ministry of The Interior and Transport has overseen numerous construction works throughout the country's airports, ranging from the building of new terminals to extending the lengths of runways and improving radar systems.

The national flag carrier is Aerolíneas Argentinas, which was re-nationalised from Iberia in 2008 with the government citing mismanagement under the Spanish firm. Under government ownership, the airline has renewed much of its fleet and tripled its size, with passenger numbers increasing significantly. Along with other international carriers, the airline handles most of its international flights from Ministro Pistarini International Airport.

Even though Buenos Aires is the most important flight hub, for both economical and geographical reasons, there are flights between important cities, such as Córdoba, Rosario and Mendoza.

Argentina had a total of 1,138 airports (including airstrips) in the country in 2013, the 6th highest in the world.

== Fluvial transport ==
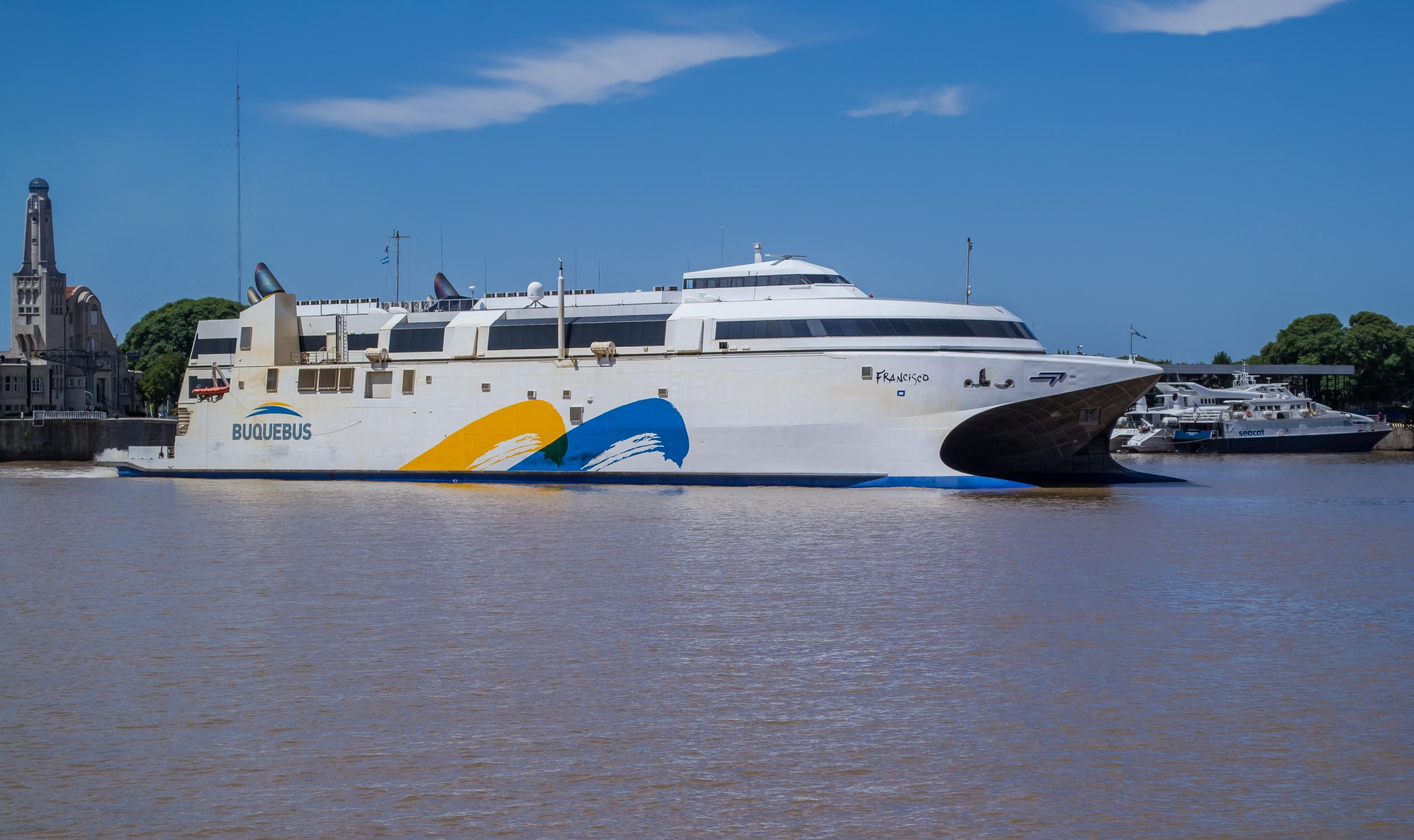
Vessels such as this Buquebus one (seen here next to the Buenos Aires Yacht Club) serve as passenger and car transport from Buenos Aires to locations in Uruguay.

Fluvial transport is not often used for people, with the exception of those who cross the Río de la Plata from Buenos Aires to Colonia del Sacramento and Montevideo, both in Uruguay. Other services are exclusively used as river crossing, such as those in Tigre.

River traffic is mostly made up of cargo, especially on the Paraná River, which is navigable by very large ships (Panamax kind) downstream from the Greater Rosario area. This area produces and/or ships most of the agricultural exports of Argentina.

=== Merchant marine ===
Portal:Nautical/Fleet/Argentina

== Statistics ==
Roadways

- Total: 281,290 km (2017)

country comparison to the world: 21

- Paved: 117,616 km (including 1,575 km of expressways)
- Unpaved: 163,674 km

Railways

- 36,917 km (2014)

country comparison to the world: 6

- Passengers annually: 2 billion
- Freight: 26 million metric tons (2008)

Waterways

- 11,000 km navigable (2012)

country comparison to the world: 11

- Freight: 28 million metric tons

Pipelines

- Crude oil: 6,248 km
- Petroleum products: 3,631 km
- Natural gas: 29,930 km (2013)

Ports and harbors

- Bahía Blanca
- Buenos Aires
- Campana
- Comodoro Rivadavia
- Concepción del Uruguay
- La Plata
- Mar del Plata
- Necochea
- Río Gallegos
- Rosario
- Santa Fe
- San Antonio Oeste
- Ushuaia
- Zárate

Airports

- Total (including airstrips): 1,138 (2013)

country comparison to the world: 6

== Gallery ==
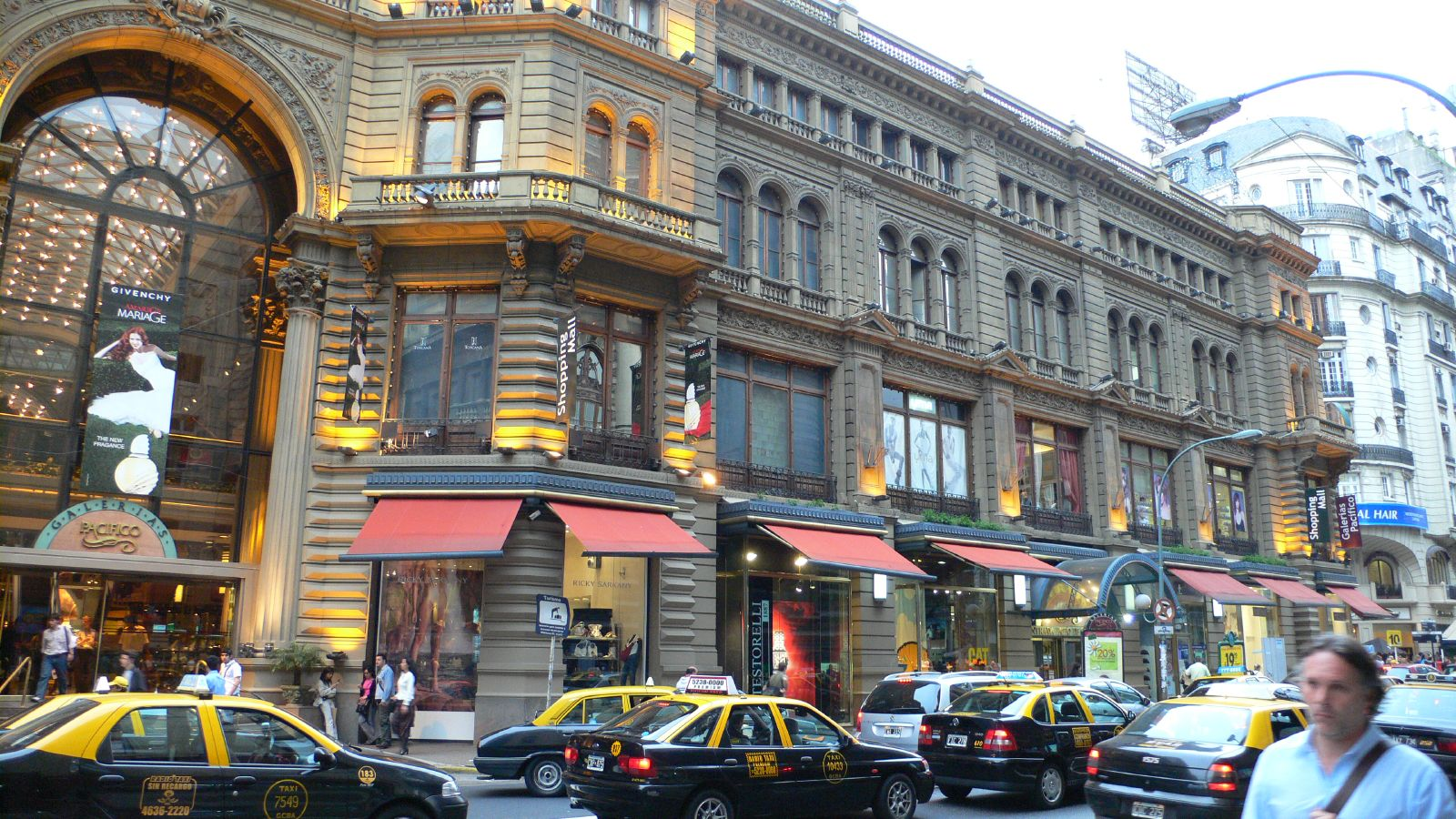
Various Taxis in Buenos Aires.

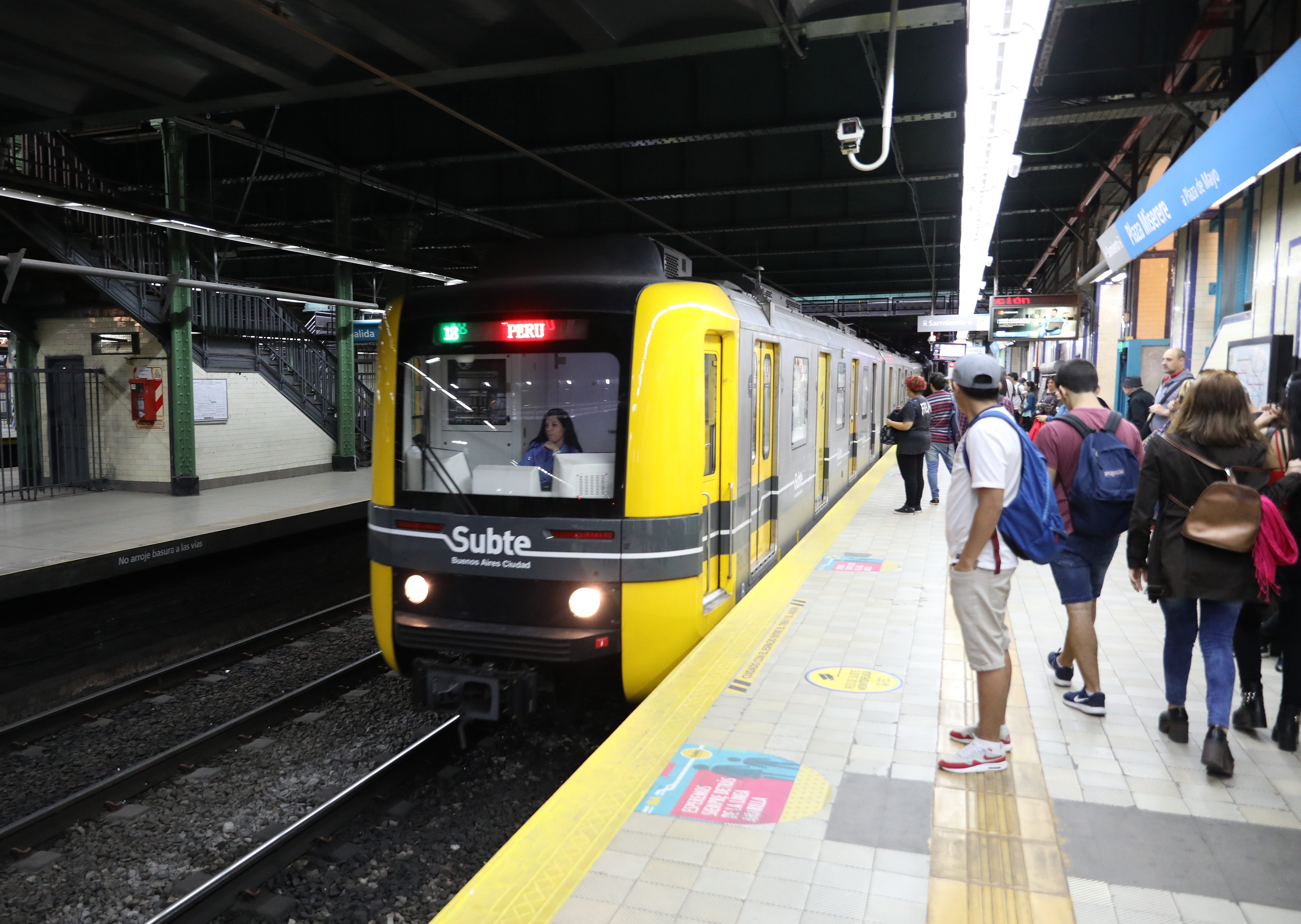
Passengers on the Buenos Aires Underground

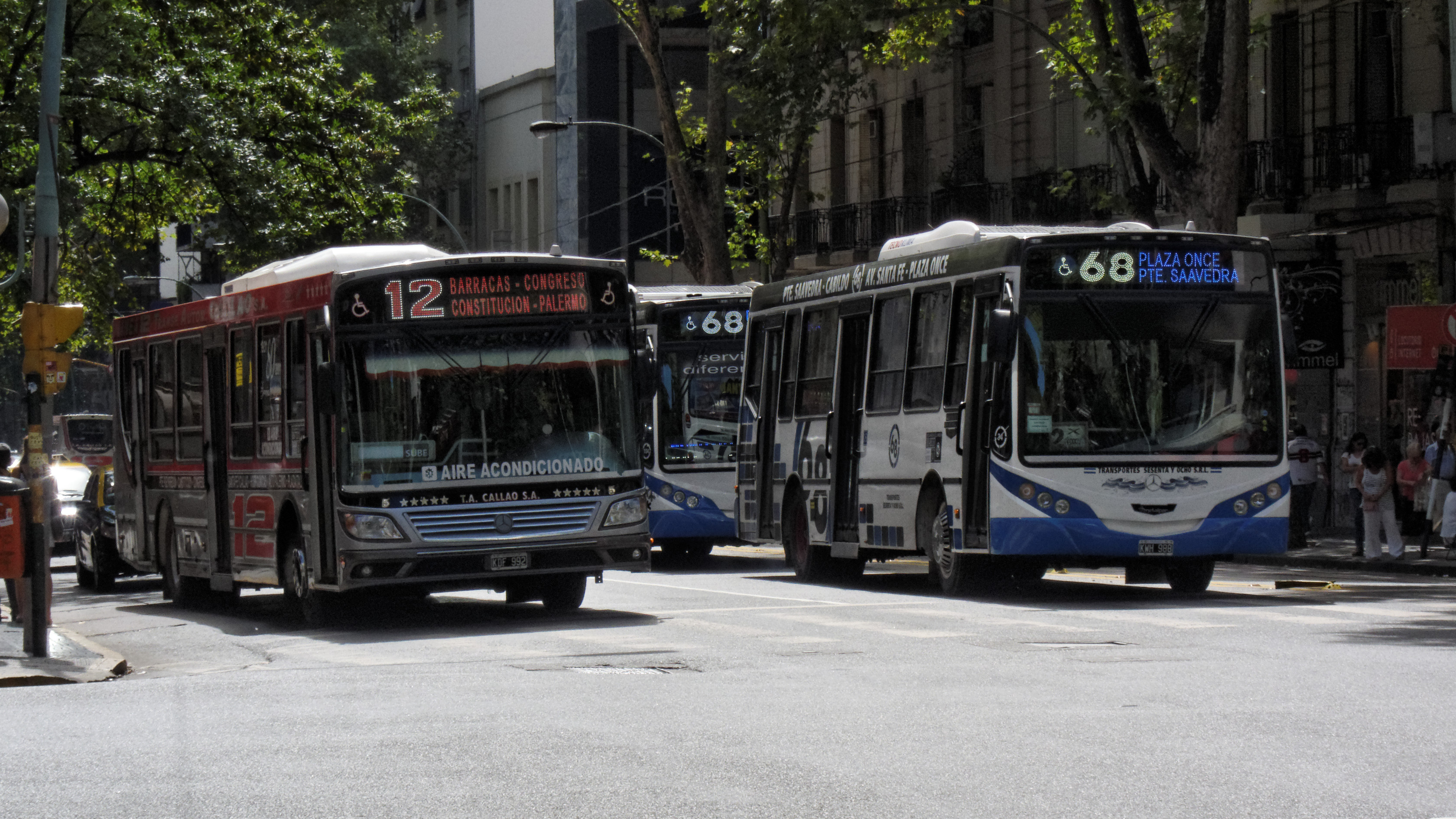
Colectivos

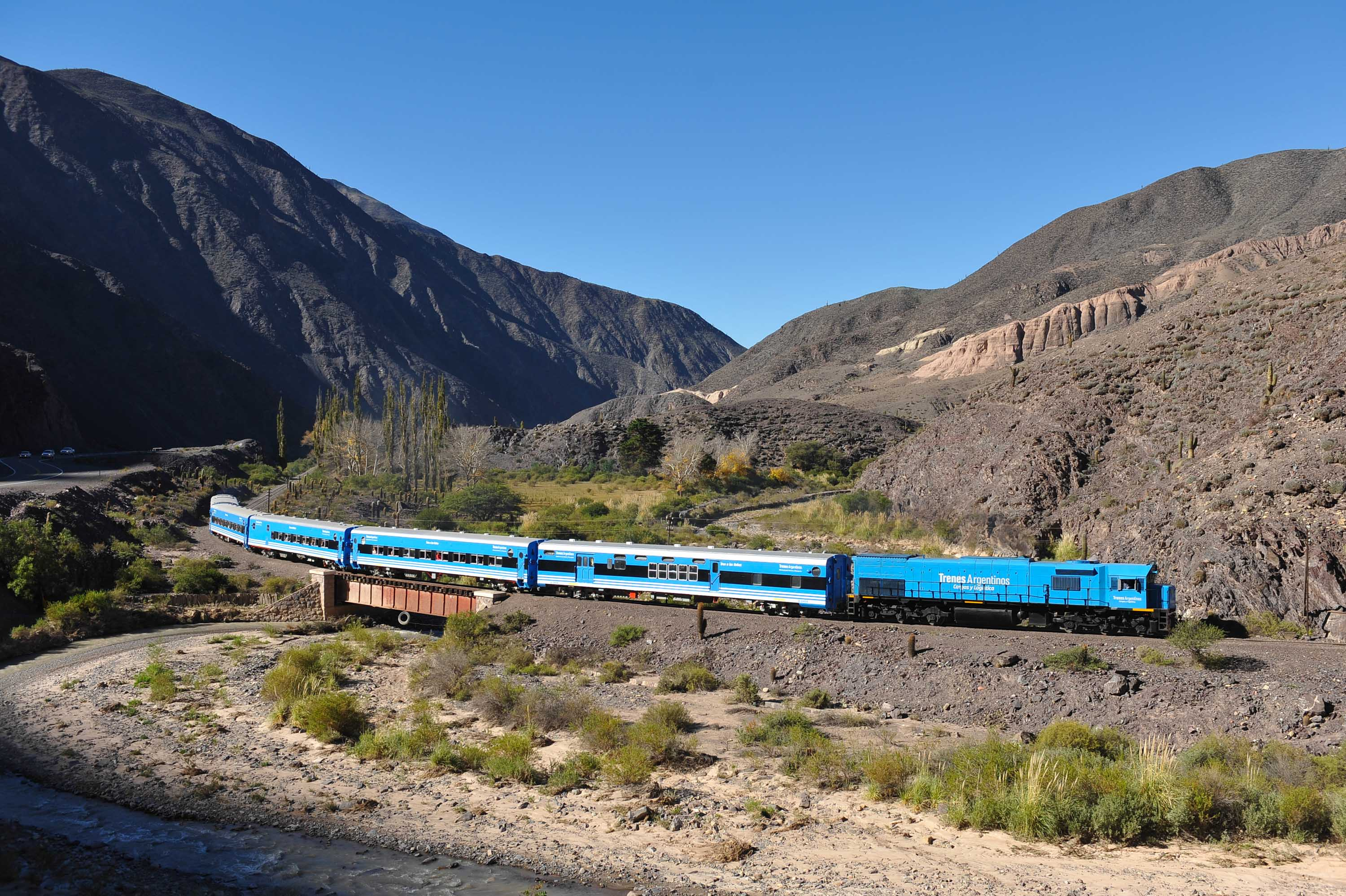
Tren a las Nubes tourist train

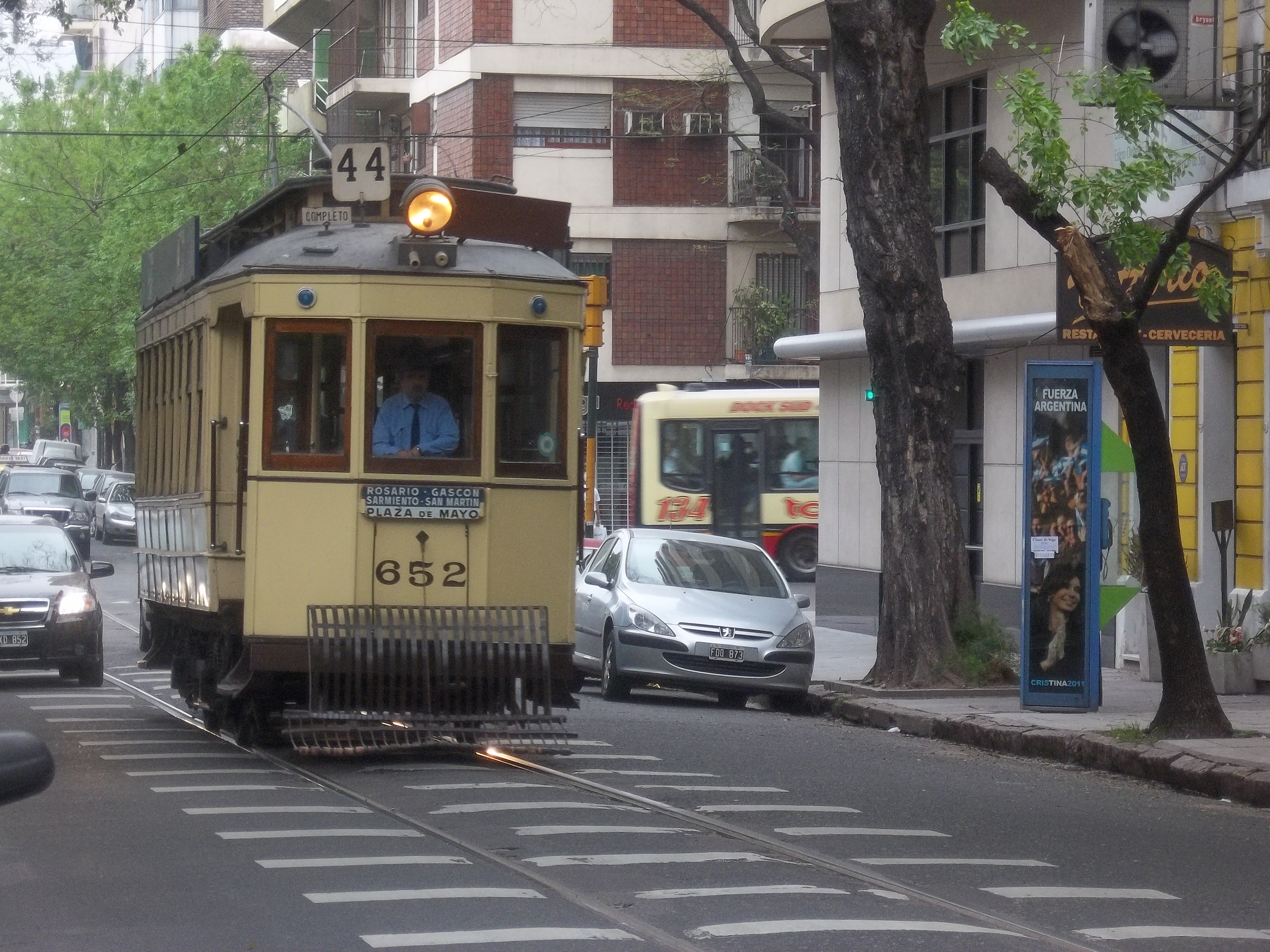
A Tram in Buenos Aires

== See also ==
- Rail transport in Argentina
- Secretariat of Transport
