= ADIF =

ADIF or Adif may refer to:

- Audio Data Interchange Format (ADIF), a file format to exchange Advanced Audio Coding (AAC) data; see Advanced Audio Coding § Container formats
- Administrador de Infraestructuras Ferroviarias, a Spanish state-owned railway infrastructure company
- Administración de Infraestructuras Ferroviarias Sociedad del Estado, an Argentine state-owned railway infrastructure company
