= Ecobici =

Ecobici can refer to one of two bicycle sharing systems opened in 2010:

- EcoBici (Buenos Aires), in Buenos Aires, Argentina
- Ecobici (Mexico City), in Mexico City, Mexico
