= Trenes Argentinos =

State-owned Argentinian railway companies

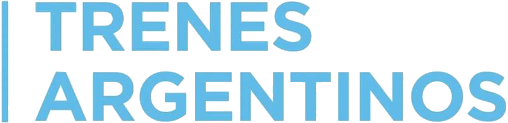
Logo of the conglomerate

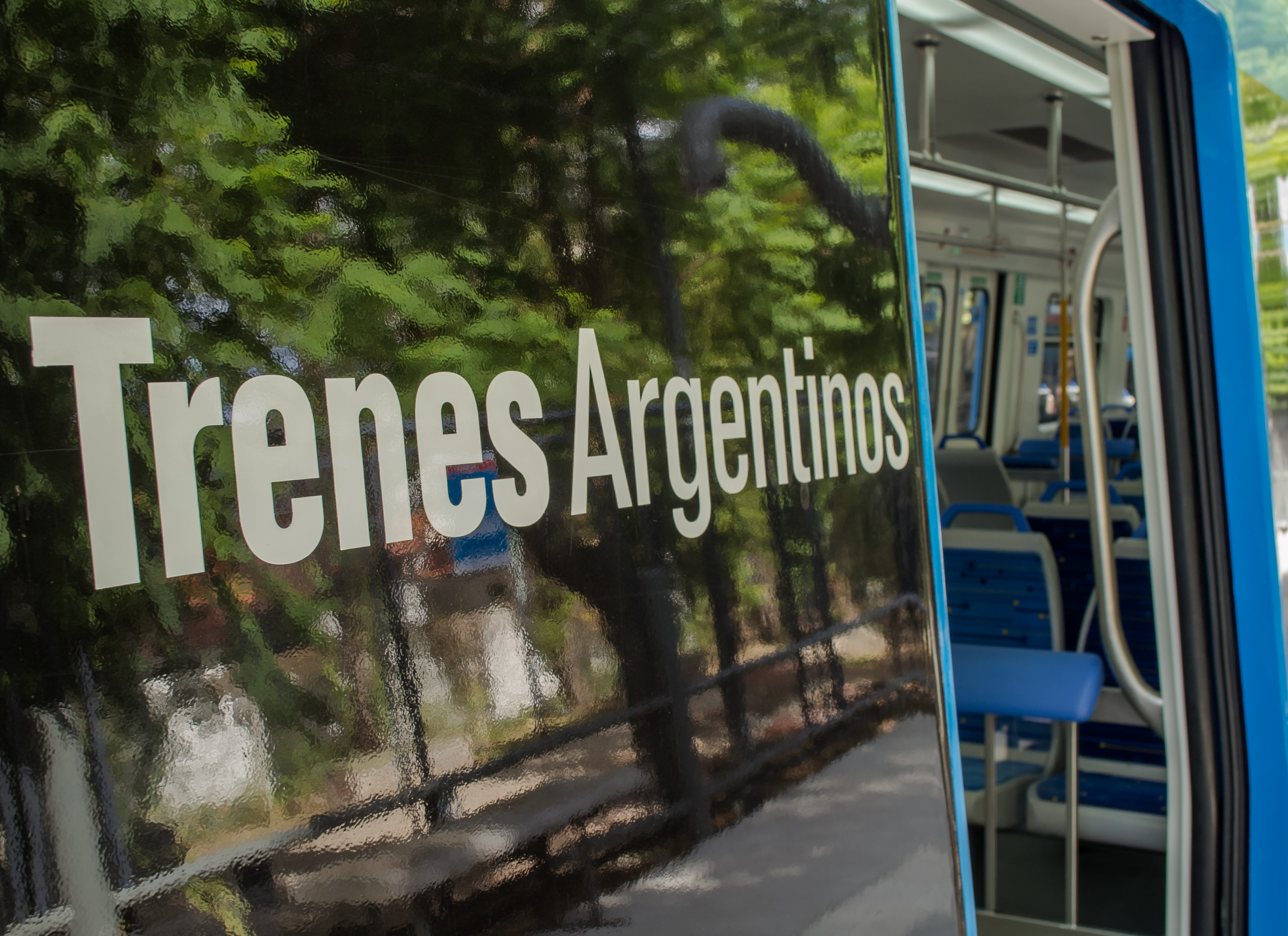
Trenes Argentinos logo

Trenes Argentinos is a commercial brand name used since 2014 to refer collectively to a group of railway companies owned by the Argentine government. These companies are respectively responsible for passenger rail services, railway infrastructure administration, and logistics operations. The companies themselves do not legally operate under the name “Trenes Argentinos”, which is used solely as a commercial and branding designation. All of them form part of the historic national railway system of Ferrocarriles Argentinos, which is composed of six railway divisions.

Since the privatization of the Argentine railways in the 1990s during the government of Carlos Saúl Menem, Argentina had ceased to have a national railway company. The antecedent of Trenes Argentinos was the creation, in 2008, of the Trenes Argentinos Operaciones (then "Operadora Ferroviaria Sociedad del Estado") (SOFSE) and the Trenes Argentinos Infraestructura (ADIFSE). These companies had a secondary activity until they took over, directly or indirectly, five of the seven lines of the metropolitan railways of Greater Buenos Aires.

In 2013 the former "Administradora de Recursos Humanos Ferroviarios" (ARHF)—created from the structure of Ferrocarril General Belgrano S.A., a spun-off company—was added to the previous ones. of Ferrocarriles Argentinos during the privatization of the services—and Belgrano Cargas y Logística (BCyL), a company created to operate re-statized freight lines and which is currently called "Trenes Argentinos Capital Humano".

In this way, Trenes Argentinos is made up of the following companies, each of which has its own structure and authorities:

- Trenes Argentinos Operaciones (SOFSE)
- Trenes Argentinos Infraestructura (ADIF)
- Trenes Argentinos Cargas (BCyL)
- Trenes Argentinos Capital Humano (DECAHF)
