= Trenes Argentinos Infraestructura =

State-owned railway construction and maintenance company in Argentina

Administración de Infraestructuras Ferroviarias S.E.

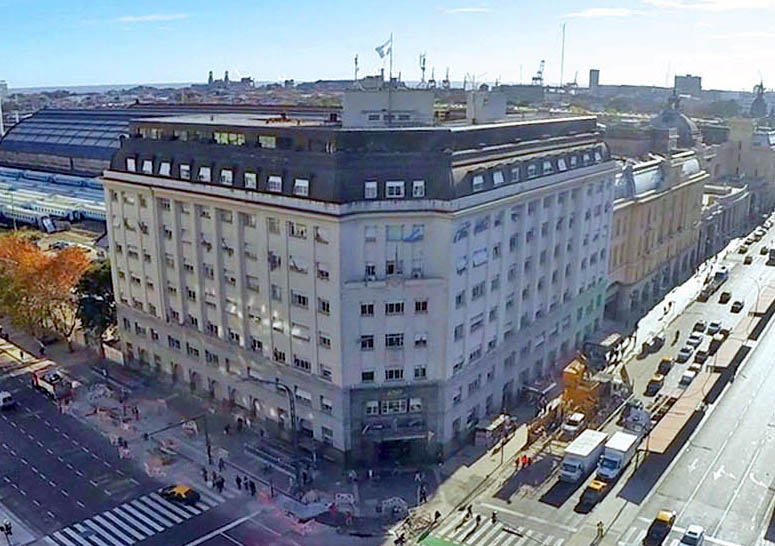
- Company headquarters in Retiro, Buenos Aires
- Trade name: Trenes Argentinos Infraestructura
- Company type: State-owned
- Industry: Railway
- Predecessor: Ferrocarriles Argentinos (1948–1993)
- Founded: 2008; 18 years ago
- Founder: Government of Argentina
- Headquarters: Buenos Aires, Argentina
- Area served: National
- Key people: Alejo Maxit (President)
- Services: Rail infrastructure
- Owner: Government of Argentina
- Parent: Ferrocarriles Argentinos S.E.
- Website: argentina.gob.ar/infraestructura

The Administración de Infraestructuras Ferroviarias Sociedad del Estado (ADIFSE), trading as Trenes Argentinos Infraestructura, is an Argentine state-owned company created in 2008 to manage rail construction and maintenance in Argentina. It is a division of the Ferrocarriles Argentinos S.E. holding company.

== History ==
Before railway privatisation in Argentina began in 1989, railway infrastructure was managed by the original Ferrocarriles Argentinos. After FA was formally declared in liquidation, railway infrastructure administration was left in the hands of a new organism called Ente Nacional de Administración de Bienes Ferroviarios (ENABIEF, in English: National Entity for the Administration of Railway Assets), created in 1996.

In 2000 ENABIEF was fused with the Dirección Nacional de Bienes del Estado, as part of the National Organism for the Administration of Assets (ONABE), which was formed to administrate all state assets, including the railways.

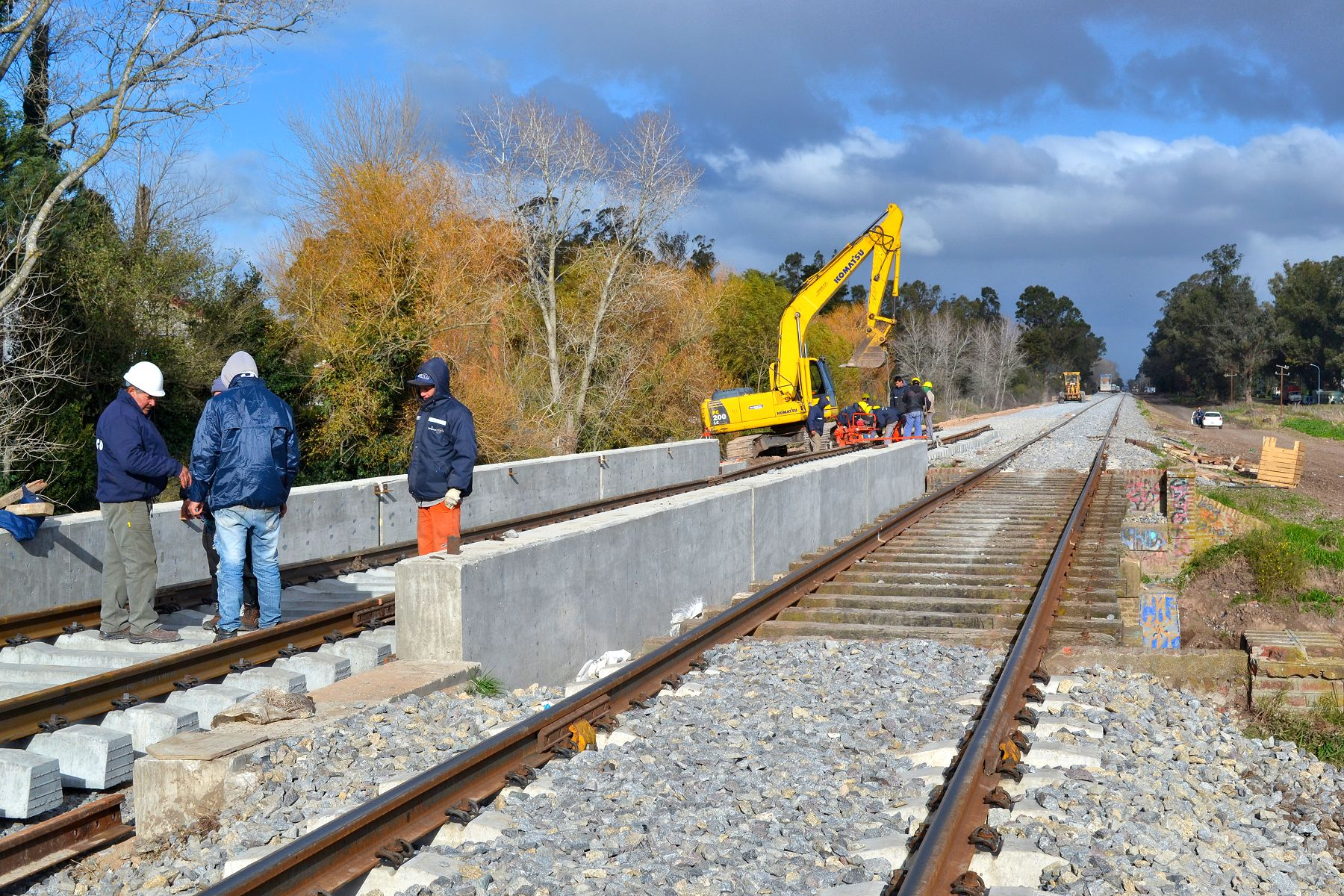
Construction on the Roca Railway

Throughout the period of private management of the railways, it was the contractual obligation of the operators (assigned through competitive bidding) to maintain the railway infrastructure they were operating, rather than the state, which simply allocated parts of the railways to different companies. However, the vast majority of private companies failed in their contractual obligations to maintain the infrastructure. This was one of the reasons for the eventual renationalisation of the railways.

On 25 March 2008, ADIF was formed, taking over the management all railway assets which had been under ONABE. As a whole, ADIFSE tends to assign different infrastructure projects through public bidding. In May 2015, the new Ferrocarriles Argentinos holding company was created, and ADIFSE became one of its three subsidiaries, along with SOFSE (passenger services) and TACyL (freight). The budget of ADIFSE in 2015 was AR$ 9 billion.

The company is a minority (49%) shareholder in a joint venture with the German company Vossloh called Vossloh Cogifer Argentina SA, with a production plant located near the city of La Plata.
