= EcoBici (Buenos Aires) =

Bicycle-sharing system in Buenos Aires, Argentina

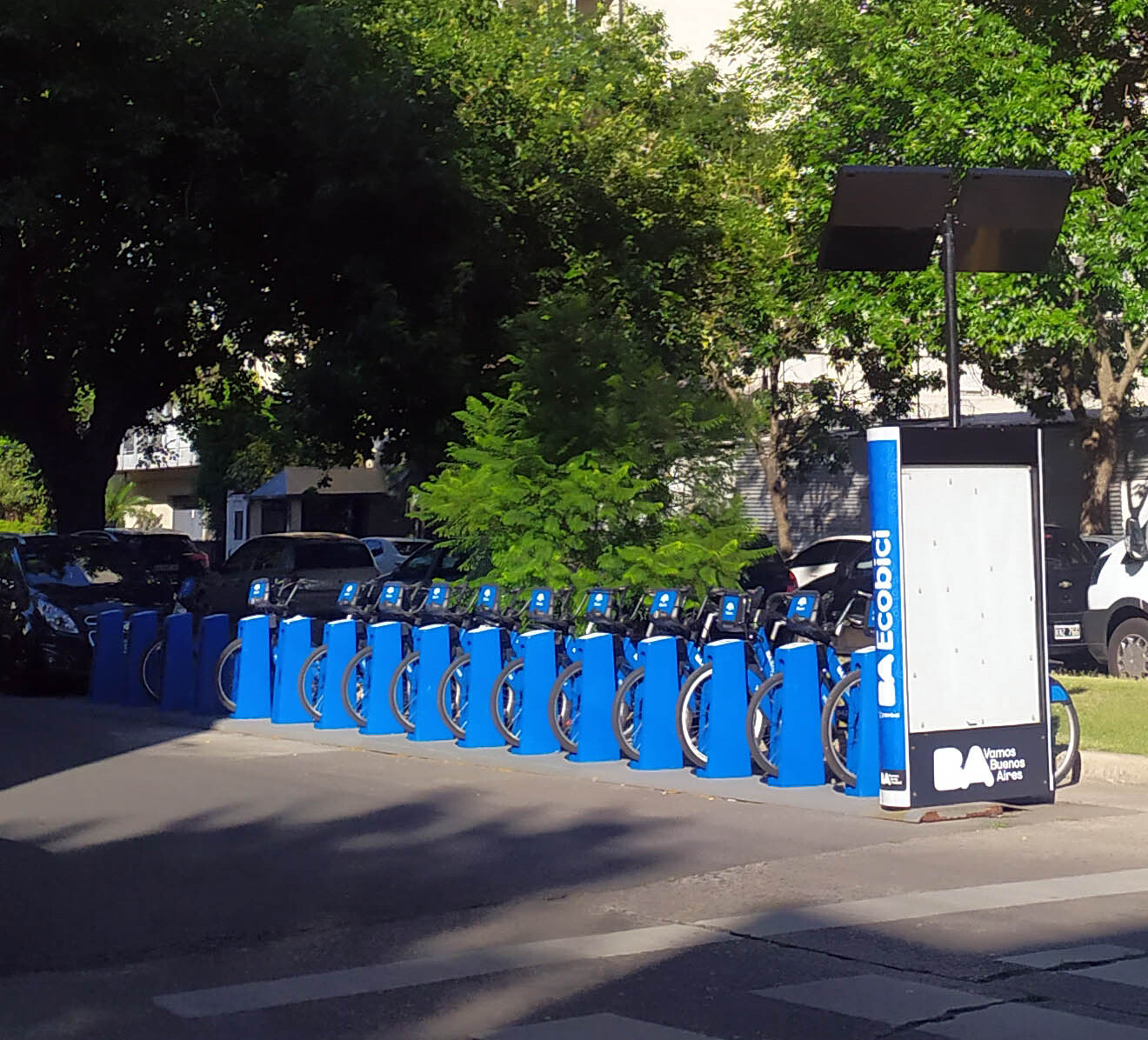
- An EcoBici stop in Saavedra neighborhood , Buenos Aires

Overview
- Owner: City of Buenos Aires
- Locale: Buenos Aires, Argentina
- Transit type: Bicycle-sharing system
- Website: ecobici.buenosaires.gob.ar

Operation
- Began operation: 2010

Technical
- System length: 155 km (96 mi) (2015)
System map
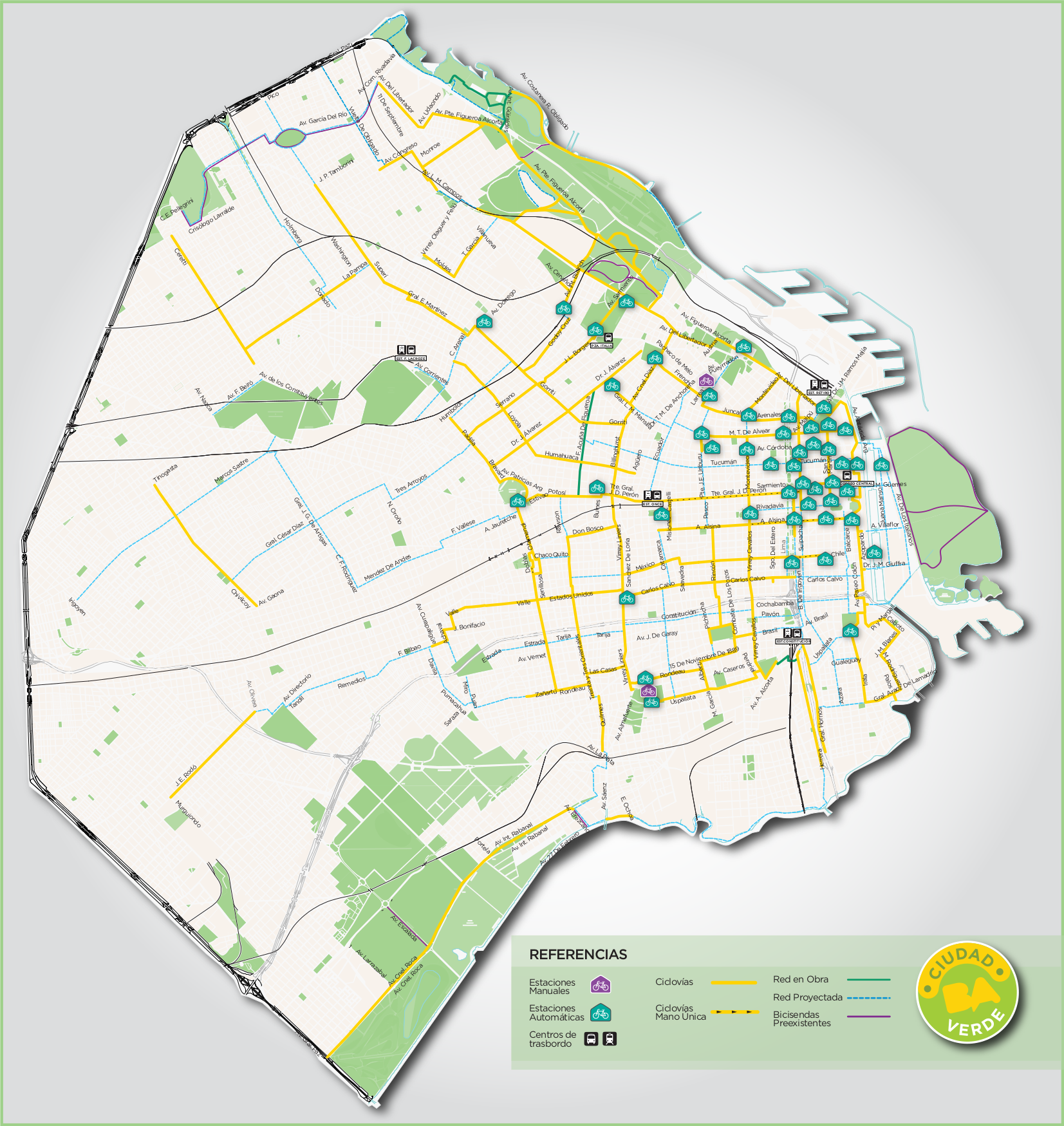
The network in 2014
Yellow indicates completed lanes, green indicates lanes under construction and blue indicates projected lanes.

EcoBici is a station-based bicycle-sharing system in Buenos Aires, Argentina, which began operating in 2010. The service is free of charge to both residents of the city and tourists, and is available 24 hours a day. After one hour of use on weekdays, two hours during the weekend and on holidays, the bike has to be returned and the user has to wait fifteen minutes to get another one. The system is still being expanded and, as of 2019, has 195 km (121 mi) of lanes completed. Stations are automatic and require the use of a smartphone application or a smart card, not in joint with the Sube card system, acquired upon registering for the service. Usage according to the terms of use is controlled via a rating system which can lead to restricted to total exclusion from the system.

== Overview ==
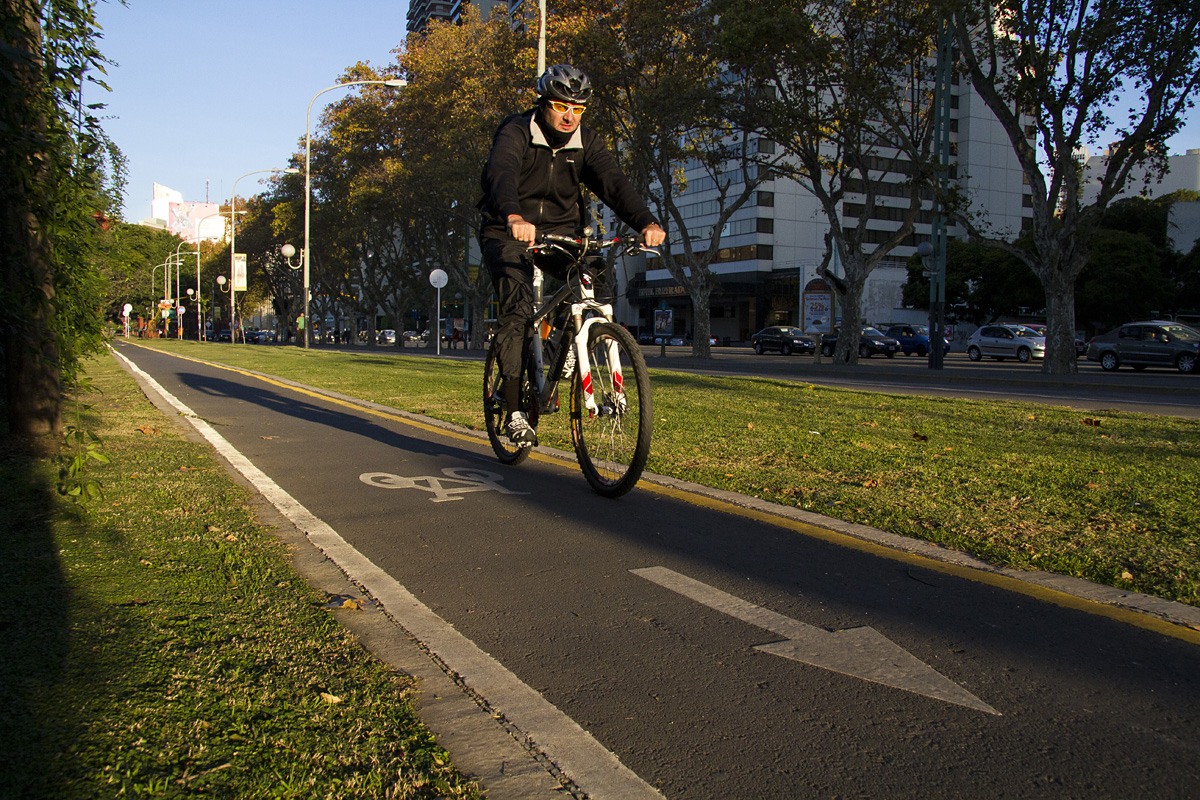
A cycle lane in the city.

As part of a so-called Sustainable Mobility Plan, supported by the World Bank, construction began on EcoBici's lanes and stations in 2009, and the service was opened to the public in 2010, with just 3 stations and 72 bicycles. However, by 2013 these numbers quickly grew to 29 stations and 800 bicycles. The system's expansion has been fairly rapid and will eventually have 200 km (120 mi) of lanes, 200 stations and 3,000 bicycles when completed.

By the end of 2014, the stations became automated (with the exception of a few) and registered users could now access bicycles 24 hours per day with use of a smart card, while the number of stations had grown to 49. With the expansion of the system, 5,000 additional parking areas for bicycles were added throughout the city.

Bikes can be retired with the use of a smart card or by use of a mobile phone application, which require proof of identification in order to attain. Tourists can register online using a scanned ID or by visiting a local municipality office. In both cases, the usage of the bicycles is free.

In the case that a bicycle is not returned on time, the user is banned from one week from the service, increasing exponentially with repeat offenders until the fourth offence when the user is banned indefinitely from using the service.

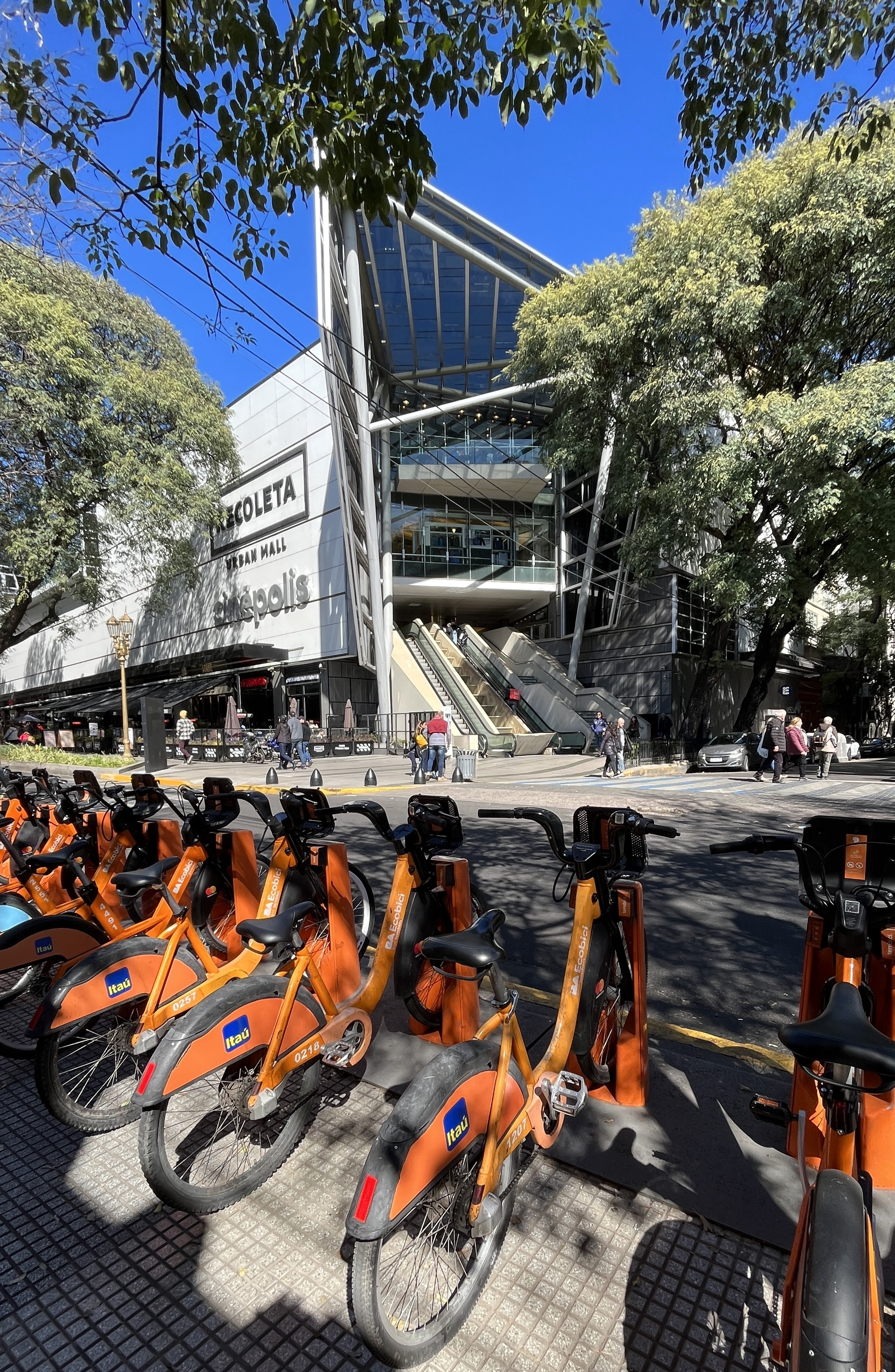
A station in Recoleta, August 2023

== Gallery ==
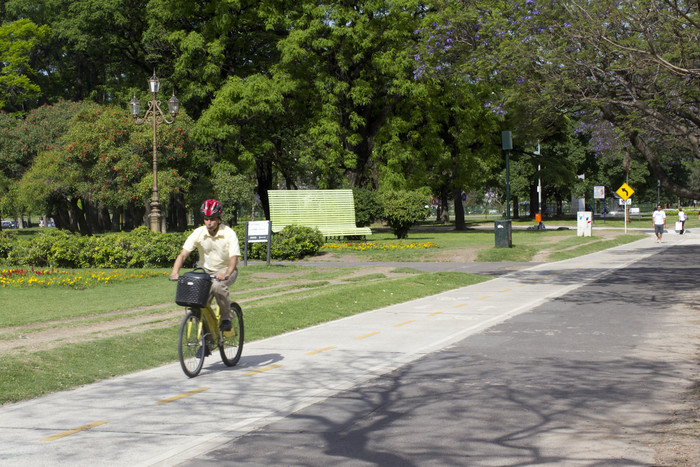
EcoBici bicycle in Palermo

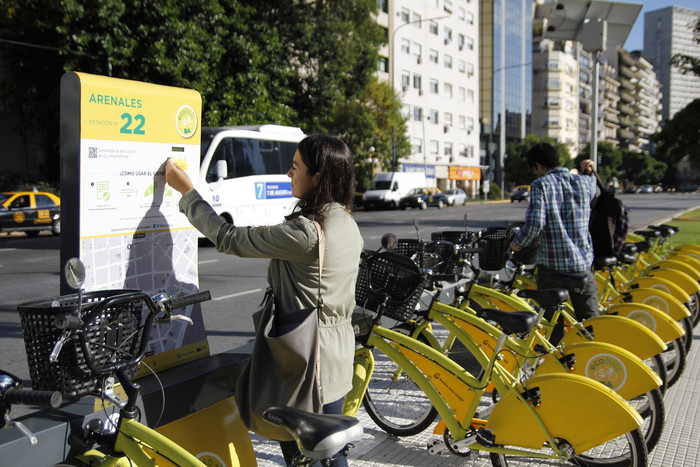
Passenger using smart card to obtain a bicycle

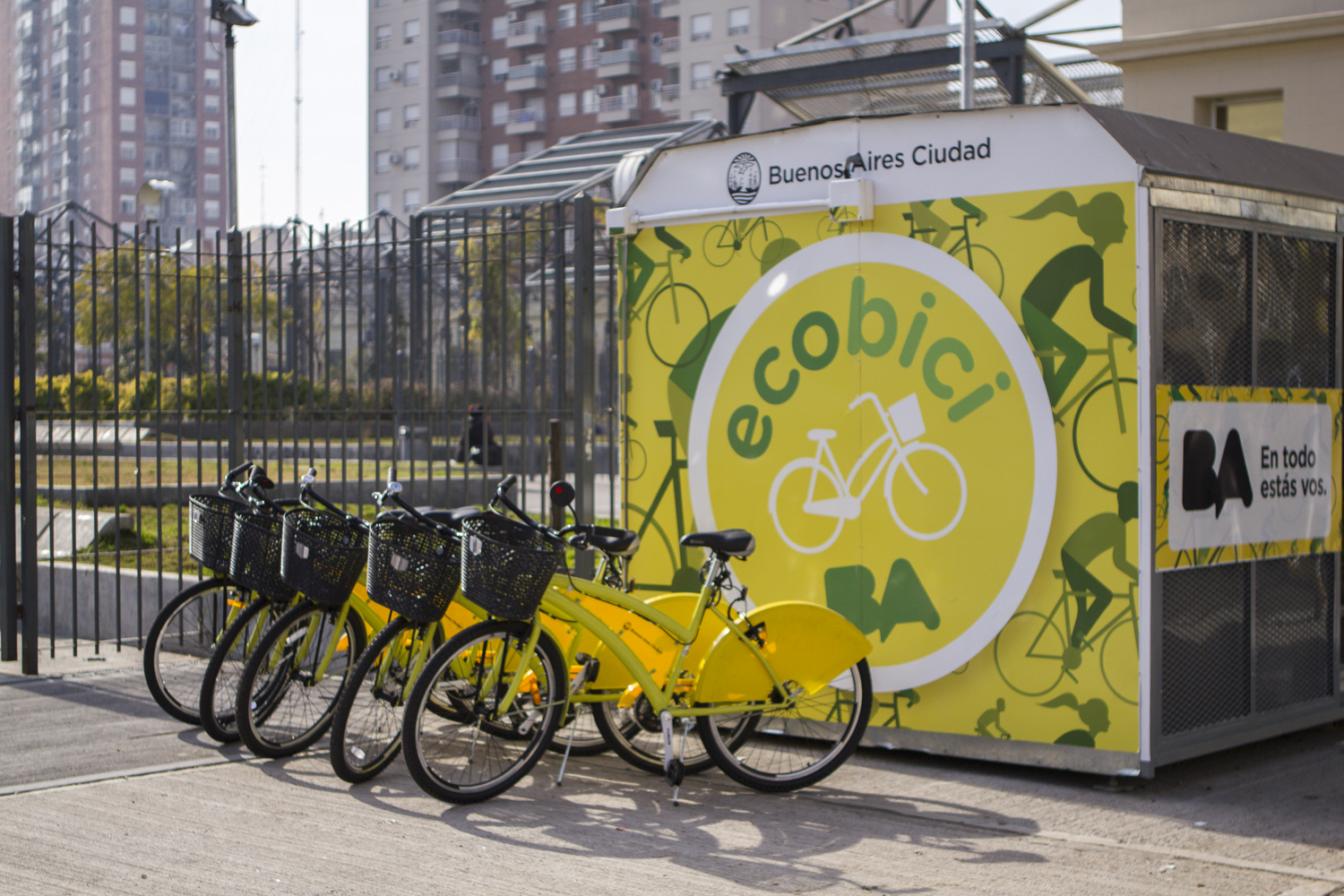
An EcoBici station

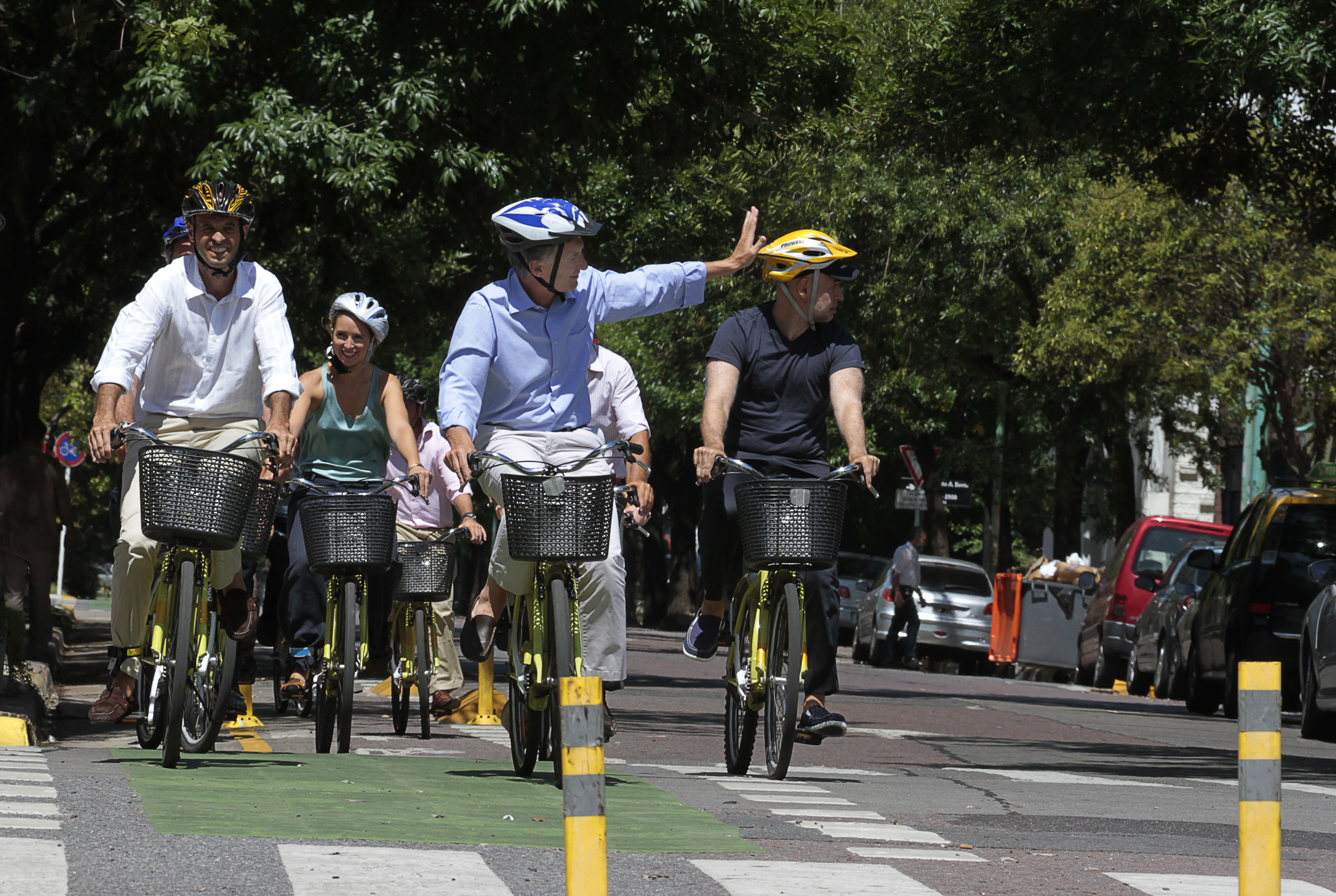
Buenos Aires ex-mayor Mauricio Macri using the system

== See also ==
- Transport in Argentina
