= Belgrano Cargas =

Former Argentine State-owned freight rail company (1999–2013)

Belgrano Cargas S.A.

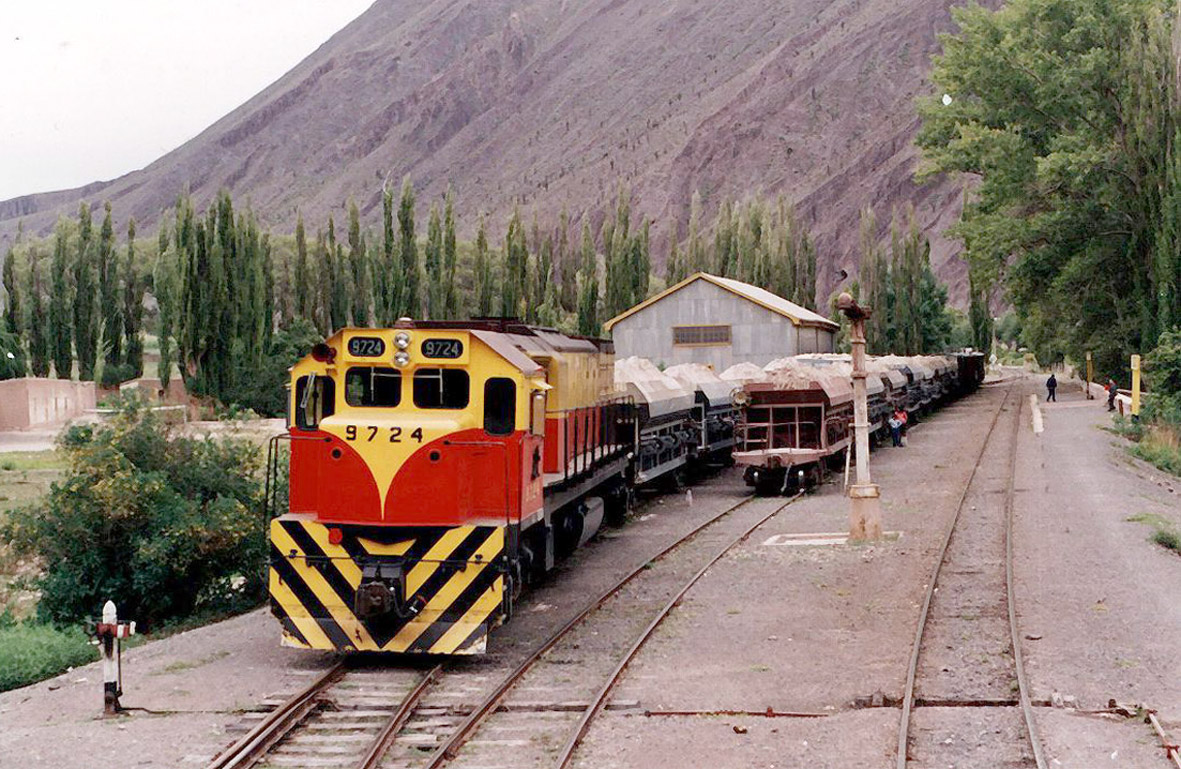
- Freight train at Ingeniero Maury station of Salta–Antofagasta railway, 1993.
- Company type: S.A.
- Industry: Railway
- Predecessor: Ferrocarriles Argentinos
- Founded: 1999
- Founder: Government of Argentina
- Defunct: 2013; 13 years ago
- Successor: Trenes Argentinos Cargas
- Headquarters: Buenos Aires, Argentina
- Area served: Centre and North of Argentina
- Services: Freight transport
- Owner: Government of Argentina

Belgrano Cargas S.A. was an Argentine state-owned company which operated the 10,841 km (6,736 mi) 1,000 mm (3 ft 3 3/8 in) metre gauge gauge freight rail network built by Central Northern and Province of Santa Fe Railways, which became part of Belgrano Railway network after railway nationalization of 1948.

The network operated by Belgrano Cargas extended through the provinces of Buenos Aires, Santa Fe, Córdoba, Mendoza, Santiago del Estero, San Juan, La Rioja, Catamarca, Tucumán, Chaco, Formosa, Salta and Jujuy. The line also reached all of Argentina's neighbouring countries, such as Bolivia, Uruguay, Brazil, Chile and Paraguay.

In more recent years, the name Belgrano Cargas is often erroneously used by the Argentine government and press to refer to the entirety of the country's freight network, and more specifically those parts operated by Belgrano Cargas y Logística. The name has stuck despite the freight network encompassing numerous other Argentine railways, of which the General Belgrano Railway is only one.

== History ==
As part of a national railway privatisation plan carried out under the presidency of Carlos Menem from 1992, a 30-year concession to operate the network was granted to "Belgrano Cargas S.A.", formed by the union of railway workers, "Unión Ferroviaria" (51%), and Laguna Paiva (48%), an industrial cooperative, on 16 November 1999. The government retained a 1% golden share and the right to elect one director.

Nevertheless, the union was involved in suspicions about the handling of the funds received to operate the line. The union alleged that the Government did not invest enough to reactivate the line which was in critical condition when they took over. In 1998, Belgrano Cargas carried 3,287,515 tonnes a year. In 2006, it decreased to 500,000 tonnes.

During presidency of Néstor Kirchner, two tenders failed due to lack of interested investors. Soon after, "Shima", a Chinese company associated with local entrepreneur Franco Macri presented an investment plan consisting of AR$ 1,400 million. This consortium finally withdrew when the Government imposed as a condition that private holdings Emepa Group and Grupo Roggio (owners of railway operators Ferrovías and Metrovías respectively) should be part of the operator holding along with Unión Ferroviaria and other transport unions of Argentina.

In 2008, the Government of Argentina ceased the concession granted to Belgrano Cargas S.A. to operate Ferrocarril Belgrano's freight services. Belgrano Cargas y Logística was established in May 2013 by National decree, to take over Ferrocarril Belgrano's freight services, formerly operated by Belgrano Cargas. In June that same year the company also took over some services from Urquiza, San Martín and Sarmiento railways.

== See also ==
- Trenes Argentinos Cargas, successor company
