= Nuevos Ferrocarriles Argentinos =

Argentine state-owned railway company

Ferrocarriles Argentinos Sociedad del Estado
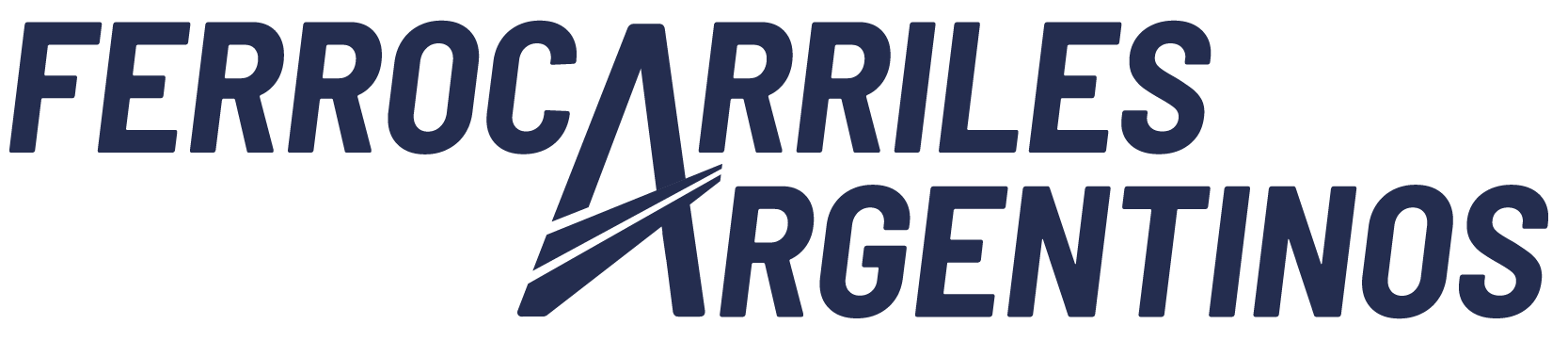

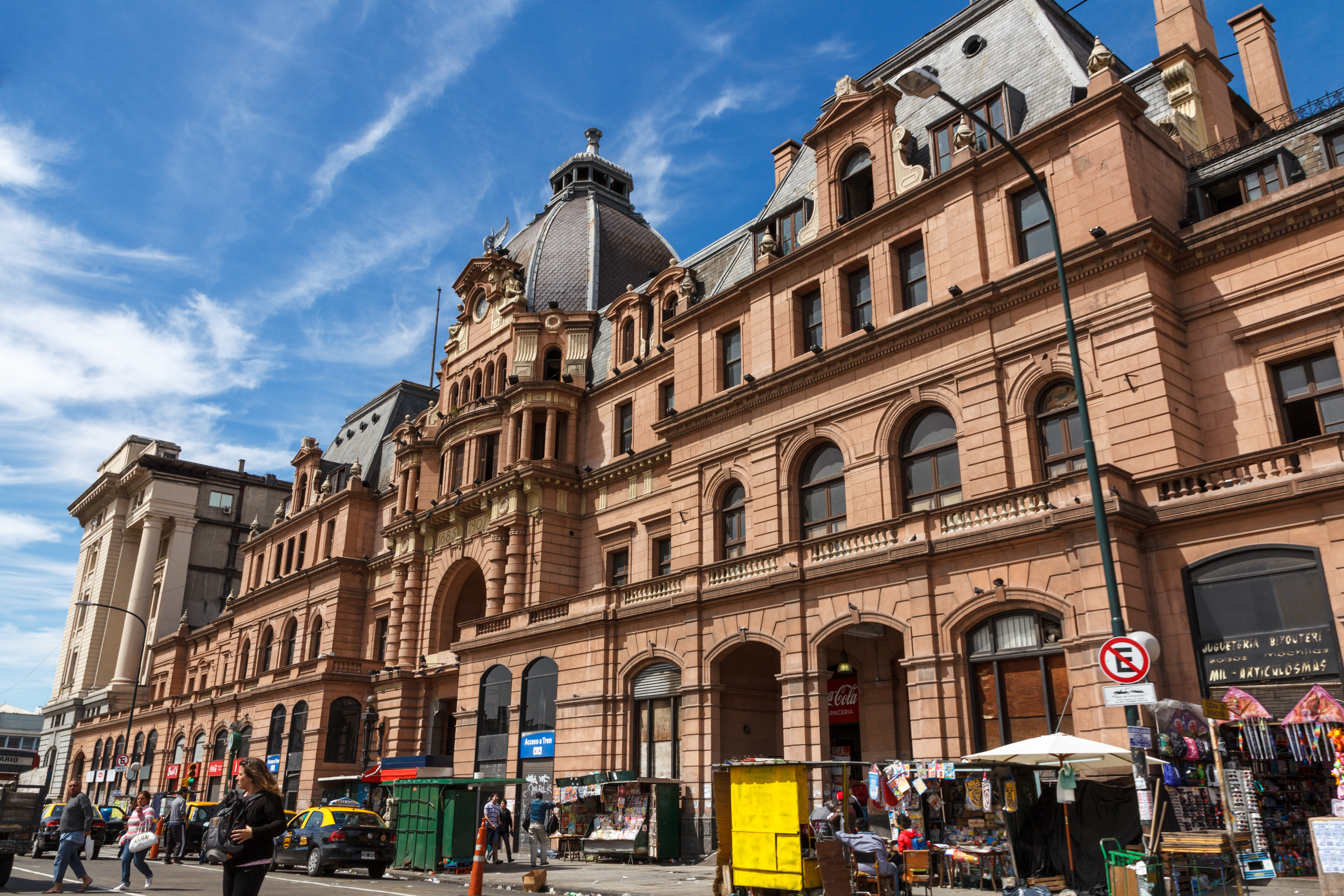
- Plaza Constitución station, company's headquarters
- Type: State-owned
- Industry: Railway
- Predecessor: Ferrocarriles Argentinos SE (2015–2025); Ferrocarriles Argentinos (1948–1993)
- Founded: May 20, 2015; 11 years ago
- Founder: Government of Argentina
- Headquarters: Constitución railway station, Buenos Aires, Argentina
- Area served: National
- Key people: José María Pirán (President)
- Services: Rail transport, maintenance
- Owner: Government of Argentina
- Number of employees: 30,102 (2022)
- Parent: Secretariat of Transport
- Divisions: Operaciones; Infraestructura; Cargas
- Website: argentina.gob.ar/fase

Ferrocarriles Argentinos Sociedad del Estado (abbreviated as FASE; lit. 'Argentine Railways'), is a state-owned railway company of Argentina, responsible for the administration, operation and maintenance of the country's railway network, including passenger and freight services, and rail infrastructure services.

The company shares its name with the previous national operator which was broken up during the privatisation process begun in 1989, and also uses a modified version of its original logo. FA is divided into three divisions: Trenes Argentinos Operaciones (passenger services), Trenes Argentinos Cargas (freight), and Trenes Argentinos Infraestructura (infrastructure).

In March 2021, the Minister of Transport announced that Ferrocarriles Argentinos S.E. would be made operative again, after an almost five-year hiatus during the presidency of Mauricio Macri.

As of May 2022, Ferrocarriles Argentinos had 30,102 employees, making it the Argentine company with the most employees.

== History ==
First company logo

The project to nationalise all the Argentine railway network had been announced by President Cristina Fernández de Kirchner during her speech at the Congress of Argentina's 133rd-year inaugural session on 1 March 2015.

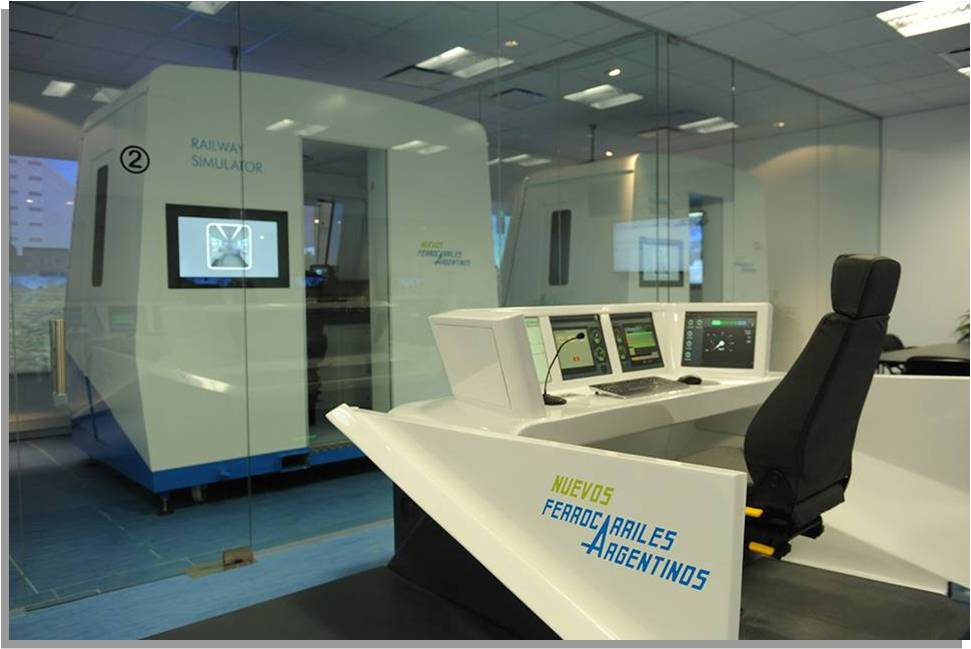
Train simulators with the NFA logo, July 2015

At the time the project was sent to the Congress to be discussed, only Belgrano Norte and Urquiza lines (operated by Ferrovías and Metrovías respectively) were under private concessions for passenger services, while Nuevo Central Argentino (NCA), Ferroexpreso Pampeano and Ferrosur companies operated freight trains.

On 15 April 2015, the Congress of Argentina adopted the creation of "Ferrocarriles Argentinos Sociedad del Estado", with 53 votes in favour and 2 votes against. Therefore, the Government of Argentina will take over the operation and maintenance of all the railway lines after they had granted to private companies during Carlos Menem's administration in the early 1990s. The re-nationalisation law was officially promulgated on May 20, 2015.

It was also announced that private companies still operating services at the time the law was promulgated, Nuevo Central Argentino, Ferroexpreso Pampeano, Ferrosur Roca, Metrovías and Ferrovías will continue their activities although Ferrocarriles Argentinos S.E. will be able to renegotiate or even cancel the contracts of concession.

As part of a plan of rail transport modernisation announced by the Ministry of Transport led by Mario Meoni, on March 8, 2021, "Ferrocarriles Argentinos S.E." was relaunched, setting its new offices at Constitución railway station. FASE had been inactive during the government of Mauricio Macri, when its divisions operated independently. The relaunch included a new logo, inspired on the homonymous company dissolved in 1993.

In October 2024, FASE's human resources division, "Trenes Argentinos Capital Humano", was dissolved by the national government led by Javier Milei. It was alleged that the dissolution would represent a cost saving of $42,000 million per year.

== Organizational structure ==
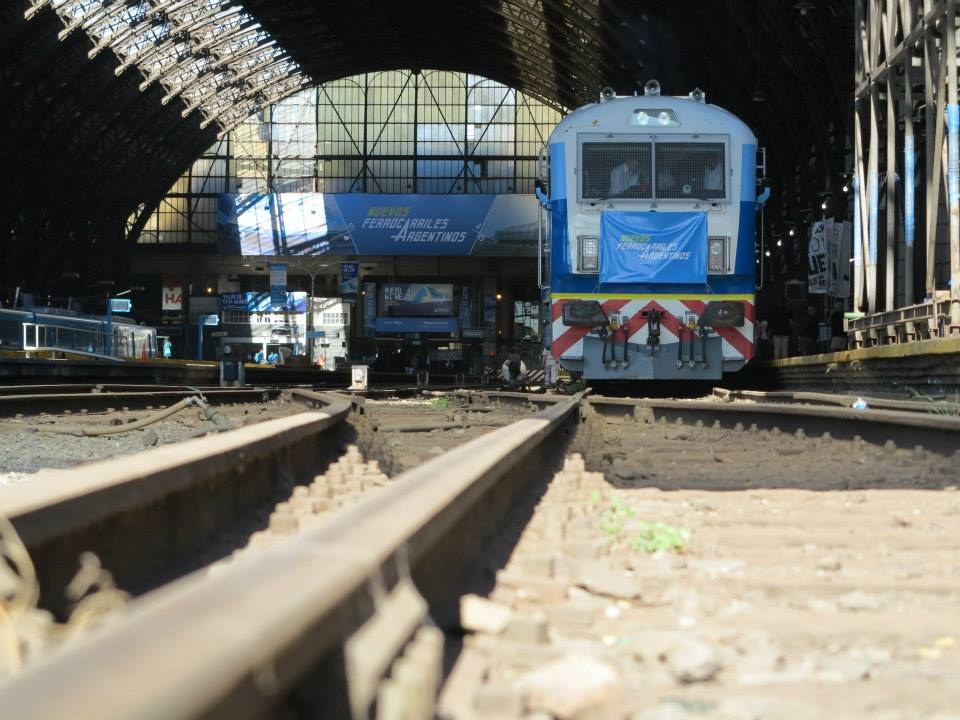
General Mitre Railway train at Retiro station in NFA livery, May 2015

By 2015, the board of directors had six members: a representative of the Secretary of Transport, the presidents of ADIF, SOFSE and Belgrano CyL and other two representatives appointed by the Ministry of Transport according to proposals sent by several railway unions registered.

The company also plans, operates and controls all the railway system in Argentina, both passenger and freight services. The railway system is managed under a model of "open access" where several private operators are able to serve freight services along the lines.

=== Divisions ===
Three divisions operate under the supervision of FASE, as of October 2024:

- Trenes Argentinos Operaciones – passenger services
- Trenes Argentinos Cargas – freight services
- Trenes Argentinos Infraestructura (ADIFSE) – infrastructure
