= Trenes Argentinos Cargas =

Freight state-owned railway company of Argentina

Belgrano Cargas y Logística S.A.

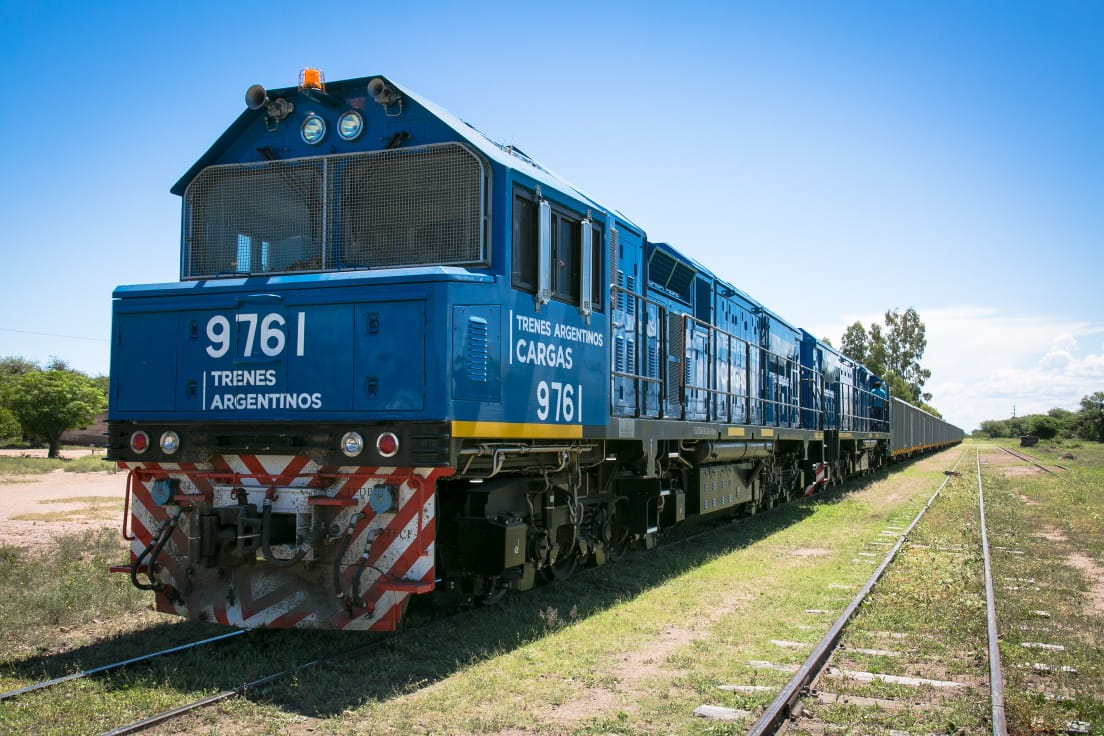
- CRRC Ziyang CDD6A1 locomotive leading a freight train, Jun 2020
- Trade name: Trenes Argentinos Cargas
- Company type: State-owned
- Industry: Rail transport
- Predecessor: Belgrano Cargas; América Latina Logística
- Founded: 2013; 13 years ago
- Founder: Government of Argentina
- Headquarters: Buenos Aires, Argentina
- Area served: Centre and North of Argentina
- Key people: Sergio Basich (President)
- Production output: 3,155,301 tonnes carried (2014)
- Services: Rail freight transport
- Total assets: 86 locomotives, 4,720 wagons
- Owner: Government of Argentina
- Number of employees: 3,740 (2013)
- Parent: Ferrocarriles Argentinos S.E.
- Divisions: Belgrano R Urquiza R San Martín R
- Website: argentina.gob.ar/cargas

Belgrano Cargas y Logística S.A., trading as Trenes Argentinos Cargas (abbreviated as TACyL), is an Argentine state-owned company which operates a 15,305 km (9,510 mi) freight rail network that includes Belgrano, Urquiza and San Martín railways. It is a division of Ferrocarriles Argentinos S.E.

It is often erroneously called Belgrano Cargas by the Argentine government and press, despite the freight network encompassing numerous other Argentine railways, of which the General Belgrano Railway is only one.

== Overview ==
The network extends through the provinces of Buenos Aires, Santa Fe, Córdoba, Mendoza, Santiago del Estero, San Juan, La Rioja, Catamarca, Tucumán, Chaco, Formosa, Salta and Jujuy. The line also reaches all of Argentina's neighbouring countries, such as Bolivia, Uruguay, Brazil, Chile and Paraguay.

TACyL currently operates 122 locomotives and 7,392 goods wagons, employing 3,140 workers whose jobs are guaranteed by the National government. In 2007, its predecessor Belgrano Cargas had transported nearly one million tonnes of merchandise, a figure which increased to over 3 million tonnes in 2014 following nationalisation.

== History ==
In 2008, the Government of Argentina ceased the concession granted to Belgrano Cargas S.A. to operate the 7,347 km. of Belgrano Railway's freight network. "Belgrano Cargas y Logística" was established in May 2013 by National decree, to take over Belgrano's freight services, formerly operated by Belgrano Cargas. In June that same year the company also took over some services from Urquiza (2,704 km) and San Martín (5,254 km) railways.

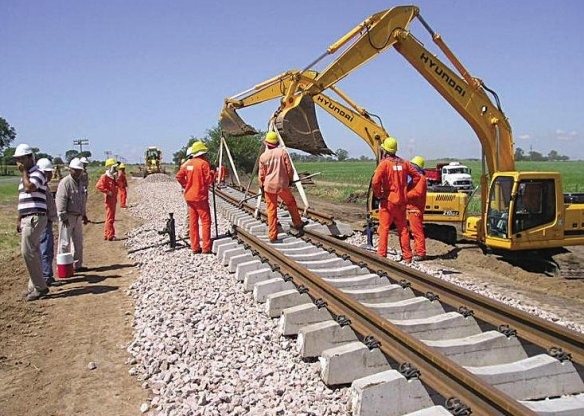
Railway workers laying track on the Belgrano Railway under the new investment plans, July 2014

That same year the National Government also rescinded the contract signed with América Latina Logística (ALL), taking over the services previously granted to the company, such as Urquiza and San Martín freight services that had been managed by ALL until then. The Government alleged that ALL had not complied with the terms of the contract, previously noted by the General Auditing Office of Argentina.

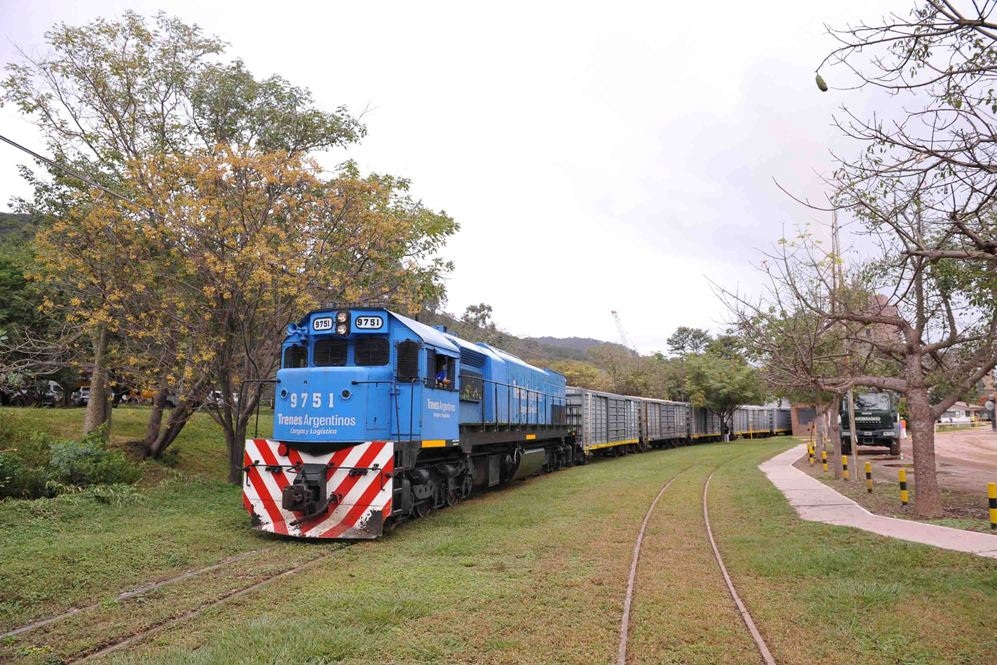
Train pulled by an EMD G22 locomotive, August 2015

Soon after nationalisation, the government began looking to expand the fleet of the company and began making orders both domestically and abroad. One order consisted of 1000 freight wagons from Argentine state-owned company Fabricaciones Militares. The company also ordered 100 locomotives and 3,500 carriages from China as part of a plan that also included the purchase of 30,000 rails to repair parts of the line.

In September 2015, the Government of Argentina announced the completion of the 100 new diesel locomotives by Chinese CRRC Corporation, being the first locomotives purchased exclusively for freight transport in Argentina. Later that month the Ministry of the Interior and Transport, together with China Machinery Engineering Corporation, announced that the original Chinese investment of US$2.4 billion in the Argentine freight network was being doubled to US$4.8 billion and new purchases and infrastructure projects would ensue.

In August 2016, the first brand-new locomotive manufactured by CRRC was finished, as part of a total of 20 units to be exported to Argentina.

== Privatization ==
In 2024, with the ratification of the Law of Bases and Starting Points for the Freedom of Argentines, the company was subject to privatization. In October, the national government announced the start of privatization using the slogan Open Access. They used a similar model to that utilized with the road network, implying that the rail road will be maintained by private companies while the competition to put trains on the tracks have been opened to competition.

The head of the Ministry of Deregulation and State Transformation, Federico Sturzenegger, explained that this model seeks multiple companies, both national and international, that can operate their own locomotives or establish new railroad transport companies. According to Sturzenegger, eliminating the state control and the monopoly and replacing them with free competition will facilitate the creation of new transport companies.
