= List of tram builders =

This is a worldwide list of tram builders. Trams may also be called streetcars or trolleys in certain countries. These companies are, or at one time were, manufacturers of genuine trams/streetcars. Makers of replica-tram buses are not listed.

Africa
Asia/Pacific	Australia · China · Hong Kong · India · Japan · New Zealand · South Korea · Turkey
Europe	Belarus · Bulgaria · Croatia · Czech Republic · Finland · France · Germany · Hungary · Italy · Latvia · Netherlands · Poland · Romania · Russia · Spain · Sweden · Switzerland · Ukraine · United Kingdom
North America	Canada · United States
South America	Argentina · Brazil
Defunct
See also

== Argentina ==
- Fabricaciones Militares
- Materfer

== Australia ==
- Bignall and Morrison, Sydney, New South Wales
- E. Chambers, Sydney
- Hudson Brothers, Sydney
- J.A. Lawton & Sons, Adelaide
- Noyes Brothers (Melbourne) Pty Ltd, Melbourne, Victoria
- Randwick Tramway Workshops, Sydney

== Belarus ==
- Belkommunmash (produced trams, ?–2022)

== Brazil ==
- Bom Sinal

== Bulgaria ==
- Tramkar

== China ==
- CRRC

== Croatia ==
- Crotram
- Đuro Đaković (factory) (produced trams, 1957–1993)
- ZET Zagreb (produced trams, 1922–1951)

== Czech Republic ==
- Pragoimex
- Škoda Transportation

== Finland ==
- Škoda Transtech

== France ==
- Alstom

== Germany ==
- Siemens

== Hong Kong ==
- Hong Kong Tramways

== Hungary ==
- Ganz (subsidiary of Škoda Transportation)

== India ==
- Bharat Earth Movers
- Jessop India
- Premier Manufacturer

== Italy ==
- AnsaldoBreda - Sold to Hitachi Rail in 2015.
- Firema Trasporti SpA
- Carminati & Toselli
- Officine Meccaniche della Stanga

== Japan ==
- ALNA Sharyo
- Japan Transport Engineering Company
- Kawasaki Heavy Industries Rolling Stock Company
- Kinki Sharyo
- Niigata Transys Company
- Nippon Sharyo
- Hitachi
- Sapporo Sougou Tekkou Kyodoukumiai

== New Zealand ==
- DSC Cousins & Cousins, formerly Cousins & Atkins
- Henderson & Pollard, Auckland
- Auckland City Corporation Tramways
- Auckland Transport Board
- Boon & Co, Christchurch
- Lyons and Co, Wellington
- Rouse & Hurrell, Wellington
- Rouse and Black, Wellington
- Wellington City Corporation
- Dunedin City Corporation Tramways

== Poland ==
- FPS "Cegielski"
- Konstal
- Newag
- Pesa Bydgoszcz
- Solaris
- Modertrans

== Romania ==
- Astra Vagoane Arad
- Electroputere VFU Pașcani
- URAC Bucharest

== Russia ==
- PK Transportnye Sistemy
- Sinara Transport Machines
- Ust-Katav Vagon-Building Plant
- Uraltransmash

== Spain ==
- Construcciones y Auxiliar de Ferrocarriles (CAF)

== South Korea ==
- Hyundai Rotem

== Switzerland ==
- Schindler Waggon
- SIG Combibloc Group
- Stadler

== Turkey ==
- Durmazlar (Durmaray)
- Bozankaya

== Ukraine ==
- Electron (concern)
- Tatra-Yug

== United Kingdom ==
- Tram Power

== United States ==
- Brookville Equipment Corporation (2002–)
- Gomaco Trolley Company (1982–) – Historic-streetcar replicas
- TIG/M Self-powered electric and hydrogen streetcars

== Defunct ==
=== Argentina ===
- CATITA

=== Austria ===
- Simmering-Graz-Pauker (SGP)

=== Australia ===
- Clyde Engineering, Sydney, NSW
- Commonwealth Engineering
- Duncan & Fraser, Adelaide, SA
- Holden Motor Body Builders, Adelaide
- Eveleigh Railway Workshops, Sydney, NSW
- Meadowbank Manufacturing Company, Sydney, NSW
- Melbourne & Metropolitan Tramways Board, Preston Workshops, Victoria.
- Municipal Tramways Trust, Adelaide
- A. Pengelley & Co, Adelaide
- Ritchie Brothers, Auburn, Sydney, NSW
- Walsh Island Dockyard, Newcastle, NSW

=== Canada ===
- Bombardier Transportation - Thunder Bay, Ontario - Sold to Alstom in 2020.
- Urban Transportation Development Corporation - Thunder Bay, Ontario 1973–1990s (used old CC&F plant)
- Hawker Siddeley Canada - Thunder Bay, Ontario, 1962–2001 (old CC&F plant)
- Canadian Car and Foundry - Montreal, Quebec, 1909–1913; 1940s
- Ottawa Car Company - Ottawa, Ontario, 1891–1948
- Preston Car Company - Preston, Ontario (now Cambridge, Ontario), 1908–1921, bought by Brill
- Toronto Railway Company - Toronto, Ontario, 1891–1920, wooden cars for mostly in-house use only, but built some cars for Mexico and Western Canadian operators by subsidiary Convertible Car Company of Toronto
- James Crossen-Cobourg Car Works - Cobourg, Ontario, 1890–1915

=== China ===
- Bombardier Transportation, China

=== Czech Republic ===
- ČKD (1951–1999)
- Vagónka Tatra Česká Lípa (produced trams, 1929–1954)
- Vagónka Tatra Studénka (produced trams, 1902–1951)
- Královopolská strojírna (produced trams, 1903–1951)
- Inekon Trams (2001–2018)

=== Germany ===
- Adtranz (also in Sweden; bought out by Bombardier in 2001)
- Bremer Waggonbau (founded 1975, closed 1995)
- Duewag (sold to Siemens in 1999)
- Gothaer Waggonfabrik
- Hansa Waggonbau (established 1946, closed 1975)
- Norddeutsche Waggonfabrik (established 1908, closed 1930)

=== Italy ===
- Officine Ferroviarie Meridionali

=== Latvia ===
- RVR (Rīgas Vagonu Rupnīca) (ex—"Fenikss")

=== Netherlands ===
- Allan
- Beijnes
- Werkspoor

=== New Zealand ===
- Auckland Electric Tramways

=== Poland ===
- Protram

=== Romania ===
- Societatea de Transport Public Timișoara (1921–1977)
- Electrometal Timișoara (Eltim) (1977–1990)
- Electroputere Craiova (1954–1982)

=== Russia ===
- Saint Petersburg Tramway-Mechanical Plant

=== Sweden ===
- Adtranz (also in Germany; bought out by Bombardier in 2001)

=== Switzerland ===
- Schweizerische Wagons- und Aufzügefabrik AG Schlieren-Zürich (SWS)

=== United Kingdom ===
- Brush Electrical Engineering Company
- Dick, Kerr & Co
- English Electric
- Maley & Taunton

=== United States ===
- American Car Company (1891–1931)
- JG Brill Company (1868–1956, but streetcar production ended in 1941)
- Brownell Car Company (1875-1902)
- Cincinnati Car Company (1902–1938)
- Edwards Rail Car Company (1997–2008) – Historic-streetcar replicas
- Gilbert Car Company (1840s–1895)
- W. L. Holman Car Company (1883–1913)
- Jewett Car Company (1894–1918)
- G. C. Kuhlman Car Company (1892–1932)
- Niles Car and Manufacturing Company (1901–1917)
- Pullman Company/Pullman Standard (1891–1952 for streetcars)
- St Louis Car Company (1887–1973)
- John Stephenson Company (1831–1917)
- Perley A. Thomas Car Works (1917–1936; bus manufacturer from 1936 on)
- United Streetcar (2005–2015) – Low-floor modern streetcars

== See also ==
- List of rolling stock manufacturers
- List of locomotive builders
- List of railway companies
