= Rosario Tramway =

Overview
- Locale: Rosario, Santa Fe
- Transit type: Tram

Technical
- System length: 20 km (planned first phase); 192 km (historical peak)
- Track gauge: 1,435 mm (4 ft 8 1/2 in) standard gauge

The Rosario Tramway was a planned mass transit tramway network in Rosario, Argentina. Nevertheless, the project never surpassed the bidding process stages. The project was assessed by Ferrocarrils de la Generalitat Valenciana and was largely inspired by the network the company runs in Valencia, though at one point a metro system was envisioned. The municipal and provincial governments undertaken discussions with the Industrial and Commercial Bank of China for financing the project, as well as Siemens to provide the rolling stock. Once the project was completed, it would be the first time trams have run in the city on a mass scale since the closure of the city's tramway network in 1963, which had reached a maximum extension of 192 km.

== Background ==
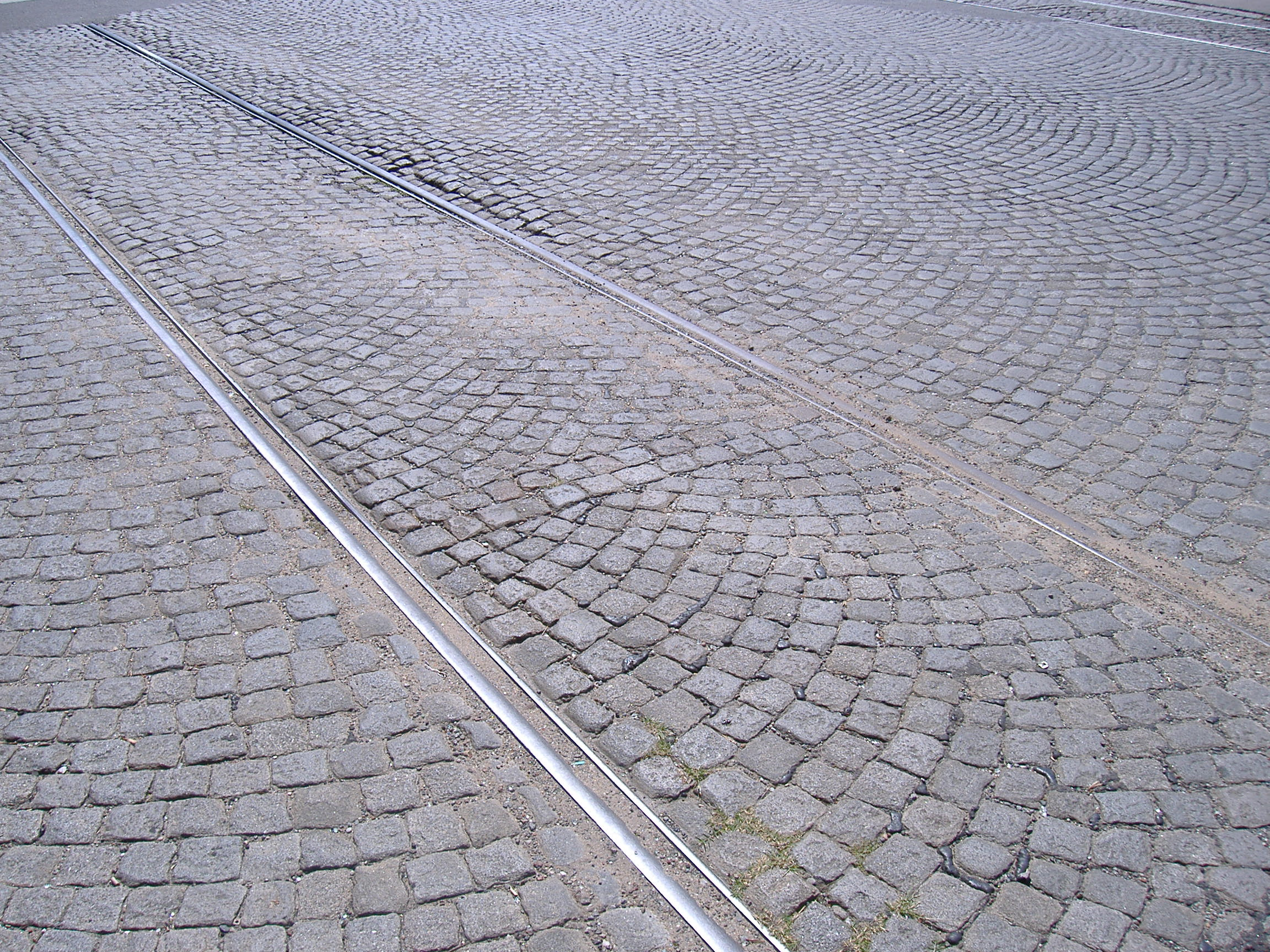
Tracks can still be seen in the city, though they are unlikely to be the ones used

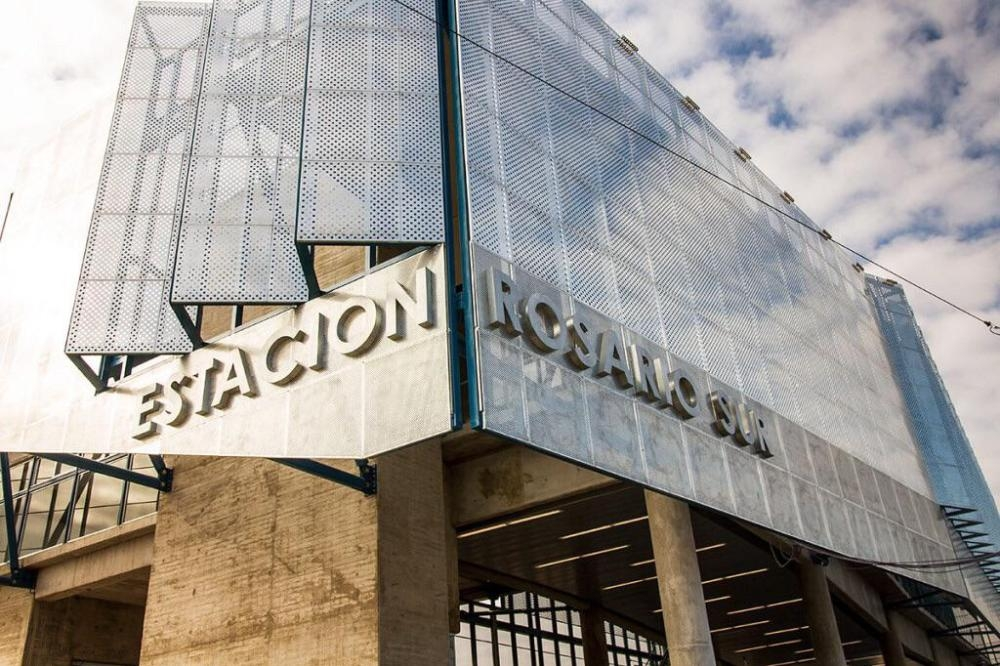
Rosario Sur Station was rebuilt in 2015 to operate long-distance services on the General Mitre Railway

The project was first put forward as a metro network which, upon the completion of the Córdoba Underground, would mean that the city would have become the third in the country with an underground network as currently only the Buenos Aires Underground is in operation. An underground system for the city had first been proposed in 1930 following the success of the Subte in Buenos Aires, though this was never carried-out, with trams being favoured instead.

The contemporary project to build a Metro in Rosario first appeared in 2008, but was dropped in 2010. After 4 years of silence on the project, it was again put on the table in July 2014 but was approached with caution, evaluating all possibilities before undertaking expensive underground works. By November of that year, the Chinese companies CITIC Group and China Machinery Engineering Corporation both showed interest in the project and both had invested in Argentine infrastructure before, in the purchase of CITIC-CNR cars for the Buenos Aires Underground and investment in infrastructure on the Belgrano Cargas network operated by the state-owned freight company Trenes Argentinos Cargas y Logística. Both an overground and underground network were put forward to the companies, while the chosen project would be carried-out on a turnkey basis.

The Metro proposal saw the creation of 20 km of tunnels starting from the recently rebuilt Rosario Sur Station at a cost of US$620 million. The rolling stock would consist of 35 trains with 4 cars each, while the frequency of services would be one train every 4 minutes. The proposal received the backing of the Ministry of the Interior and Transport on a national level, as well as politicians on a provincial level, but was opposed by delegates from the Socialist Party who favoured a tram system over a metro. Another proposal was a broader Sistema Integrado de Movilidad Urbana (Integrated System of Urban Mobility, or SIMU) which would combine street level transport with underground transport, monorails, the existing trolleybus network and other initiatives such as bicycle lanes and was deemed less costly than a Metro system by its proponents.

The governor of Santa Fe Province Antonio Bonfatti (also of the Socialist Party) also opposed the Metro plan, favouring instead an urban tramway system. He stated that a Metro system was unnecessary in a city whose population is not expected to grow significantly in the future, while a tramway system also has the advantages of being cheaper and is more feasible to run 24 hours a day in a country which has considerable nocturnal activity. In Contrast, the Asociación Amigos del Riel de Rosario (Association of Friends of the Rail of Rosario) responded by saying that the soil in the city is very suitable for the building of tunnels and supported the construction of a Metro system, though the organisation had some reservations on the project's time frame saying that it should be a long-term aim and only be carried-out after a series of commuter rail lines are established and the Rosario trolleybus network is improved along with the re-establishment of the former tram network.

== Current plans ==
Ultimately, the tramway proposal proved the most favourable and the bidding process began on 21 July 2015, one year after the metro project was re-initiated and numerous proposals put forward. The governor of the province said that more concrete plans would be announced by the end of the month and whether the network would maintain its original route or not, though it was confirmed that Siemens and the Industrial and Commercial Bank of China would put forward bids.

On 30 October 2015, it was announced that the project was accepting bids for the initial 20 km route. The total cost is expected to be a US$360 million and connect together the city's main bus and rail terminals, with an estimated completion year set at 2019 should this phase of the project remain on schedule. Officials further justified the decision of opting for a tramway instead of an underground, saying that each kilometre of tramway costs US$18 million, while for an underground this figure would have been US$120 million. Municipal officials proposed the reintroduction of a light rail transit system to ease urban congestion, dubbed the Rosario Tramway project. The initial phase envisioned a 20-kilometre (12 mi) network utilizing standard gauge tracks.

== Previous tramway network ==
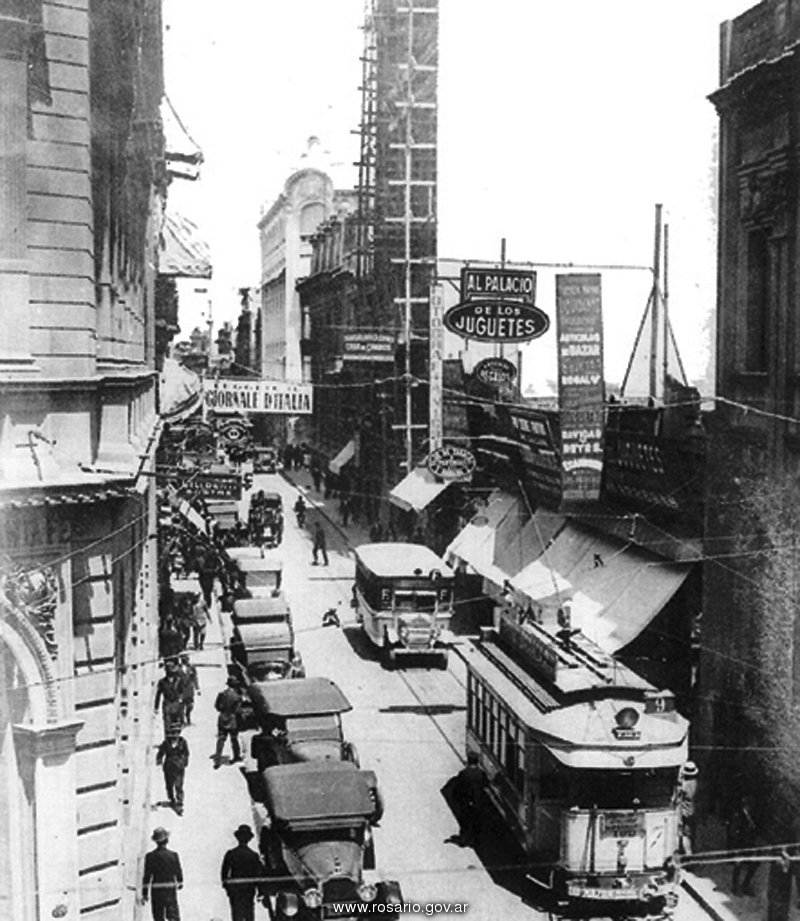
The city had a tramway network until 1963.

The city was the third in Argentina to receive an electrified tramway network, after La Plata and Buenos Aires. The first horse-drawn trams appeared in the city in 1872 and two lines were built in the city with Argentine capital. The network began growing at a faster pace when the Anglo-Argentine Tramways Company (AATC) which owned one of the most expansive tramway networks in the world in Buenos Aires, and later built Line A of the Buenos Aires Underground, began investing heavily in the city. Argentine companies also continued investing in the network, and by 1890 it was 77 km long and was transporting 7 million passengers annually.

In 1897 the Buenos Aires tramway network was electrified and the same was proposed for Rosario in 1899, however it would not be undertaken until 1905. In 1906 the first electric trams began operating in the city and were colloquially known as "The Belgians" since the Belgian company Sofina had bought the CTAA by this point. A total of 14 electric lines were built in the city as the network expanded.

At its peak, the network had 300 vehicles on its 192 km network, but by 1920, competition from bus transport began to take its toll and by 1927 the company was losing money. The situation continued to worsen and hit crisis point in 1932 when services were suspended. In the same year, the municipality decided to nationalise all bus and tram transport in the city in order to continue operating the trams and more effectively manage transport in the city. However, by the early 1950s the municipality was unable to keep up with the costs of running the network, so it was transferred to the provincial government.

In the early 1960s, it was decided to abandon tramways nationwide by the National Government of the time and privatise lines. Soon after, the private companies abandoned the tramways in favour of bus and trolleybus transport and trams were scrapped. The last tram in Rosario operated on 11 February 1963.

=== Heritage tramway ===
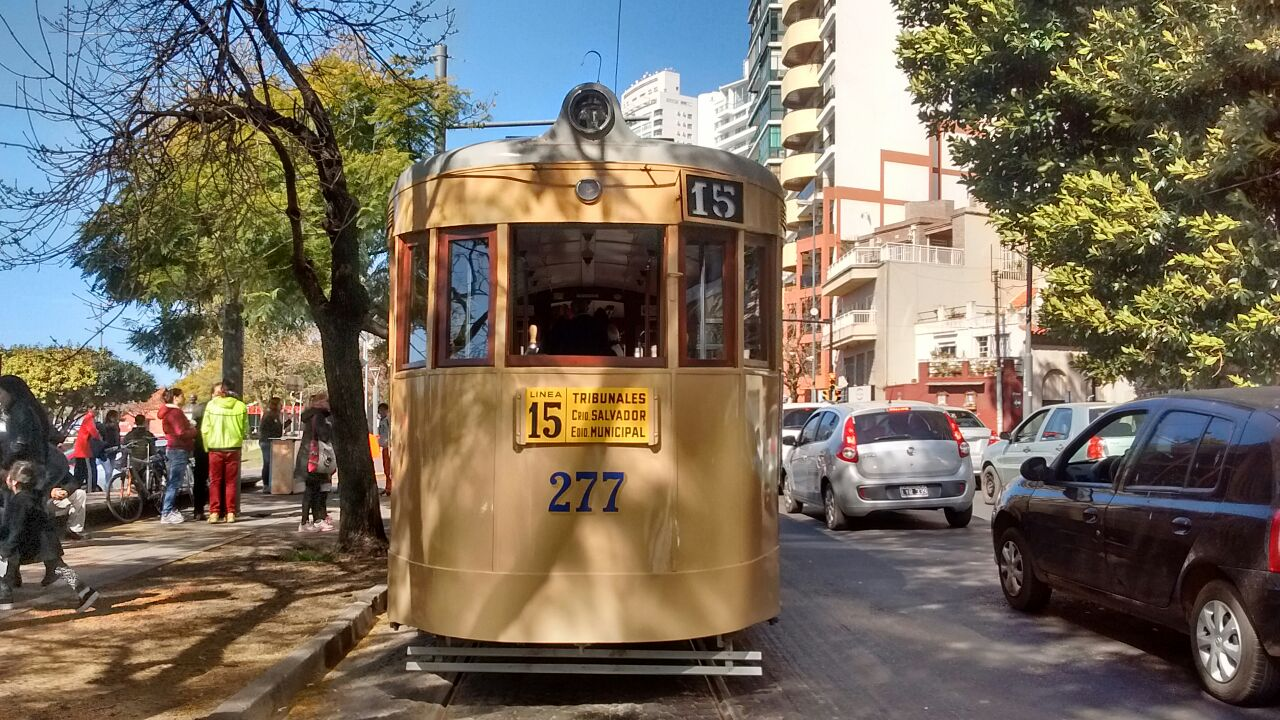
Heritage tramway operated by the Association of Friends of the Rail of Rosario.

There is a heritage tramway known as the Bicentennial Tramway which runs through the city with two different routes and a total of 19 stops using trams converted to run on rubber tyres with power from the overhead lines of the trolleybus network. In June 2015, a heritage tram operated by the Association of Friends of the Rail of Rosario began running on rails using one of the original trams from the network restored to its original state, with the intention of running more heritage services and restoring more trams in Rosario in the future.

== See also ==
- Trolleybuses in Rosario
- Buenos Aires Underground
- Córdoba Underground
- Trams in Buenos Aires
- Rail transport in Argentina
