= Plaza Sarmiento (Rosario) =

Plaza in city of Rosario, Santa Fe, Argentina

Coordinates: 32.94947°S 60.642541°W

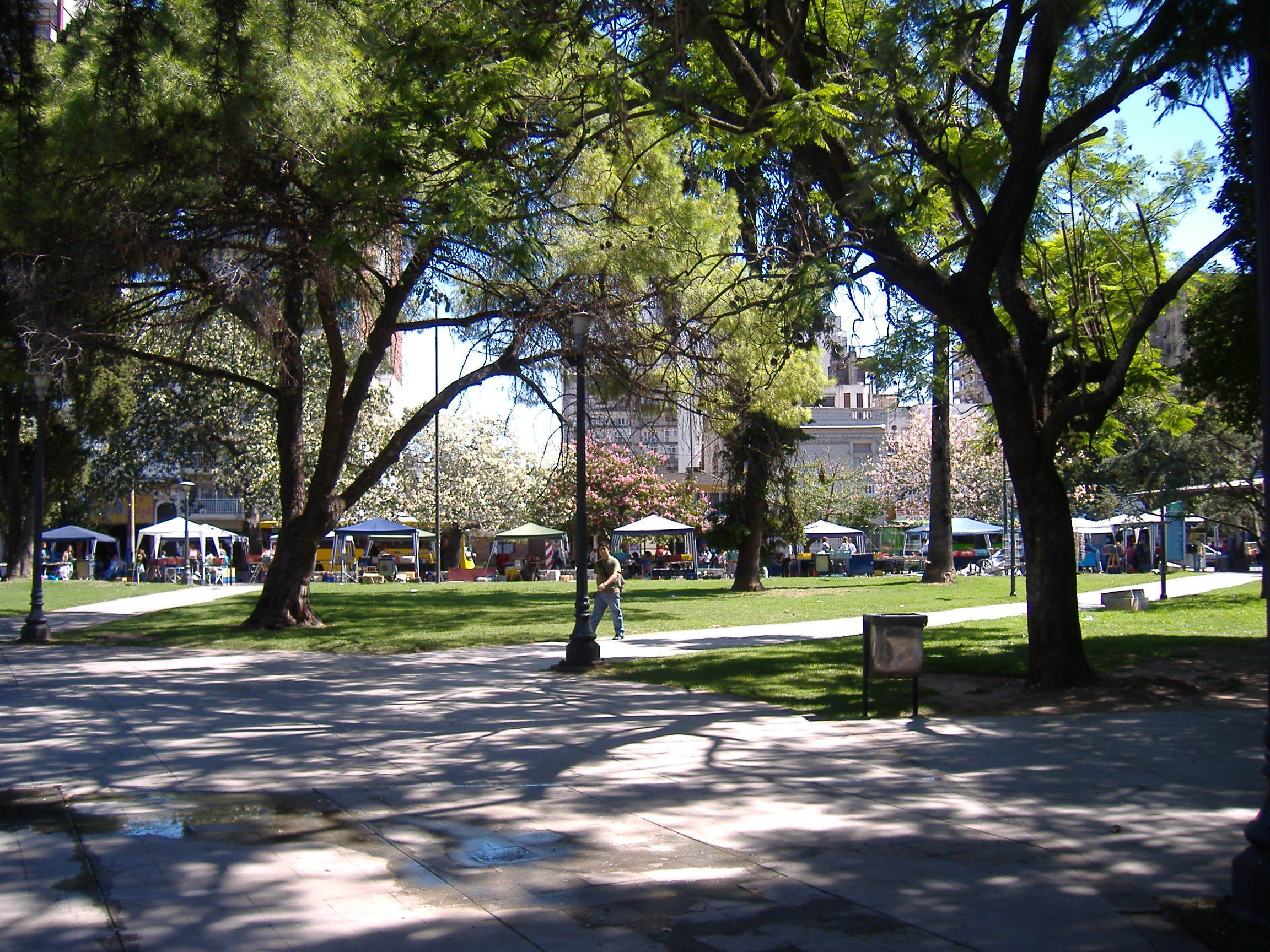
Looking into the plaza

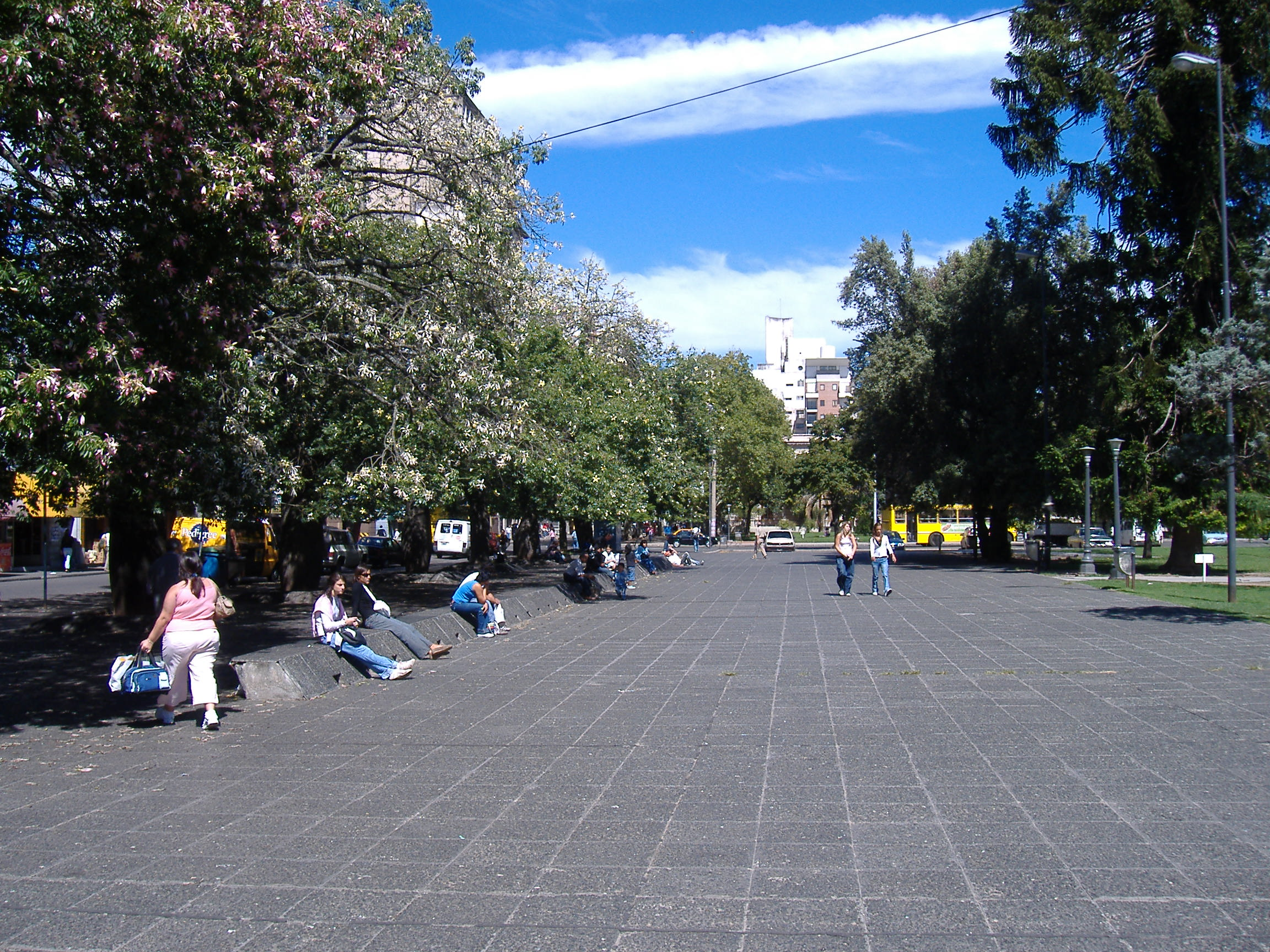
Facing south

Plaza Sarmiento is a plaza (urban square) in the city of Rosario, province of Santa Fe, Argentina. Its name is a homage to former Argentine president Domingo Faustino Sarmiento.

Plaza Sarmiento is situated in a strategic location within the Rosario downtown area, and serves as a transport node for many urban and short-distance interurban bus lines. It occupies almost two blocks, defined by San Luis St., Entre Ríos St., Mendoza St. and Corrientes St. It is divided by San Juan St. (running east–west). It features a monument crowned by a statue of Sarmiento, known as a pioneer and promoter of public education in Argentina. The only route of the Rosario trolleybus system, line K, passes through Plaza Sarmiento.

The plaza currently hosts an outdoors artisans' fair several days each week.

== History ==
The area where the current plaza is located was formerly occupied by a small lagoon (Laguna Sánchez). In 1867, the governor of Santa Fe, Nicasio Oroño, upon a request of the municipal government, ordered the terrain to be expropriated and four blocks to be set aside to establish a public square. In 1874, the Deliberative Council of Rosario requested terrain plans to be made for the future square, called Plaza Urquiza. The lagoon was emptied and refilled with earth.

The square was officially declared a public plaza on 16 March 1875. A strip of land on the southern edge was given to the national state for the construction of Normal School No. 1. The rest of the southern block was named Plaza Iriondo, although the public referred to it as Plaza Santa Rosa. The monument and statue of Domingo Faustino Sarmiento, in the center of the plaza, which was to carry Sarmiento's name, was inaugurated on 20 December 1911. The sculptor was Victor de Pol.
