= Trams in Buenos Aires =

Former transportation system in Buenos Aires

Map of the tramway network as it was in 1938.

The first trams in Buenos Aires began operating in 1863 in what quickly became a vast network of tramways with the city being known as the "City of Trams" for having the highest tramway-to-population ratio in the world. In the 1920s, Buenos Aires had 875 km (544 mi) of tramways and 99 tram lines using 3000 carriages running throughout the city. By 1963, the vast majority of the network began to be dismantled, though some minor tram services continue in the city today.

== History ==
=== Horse-drawn and steam-powered trams ===
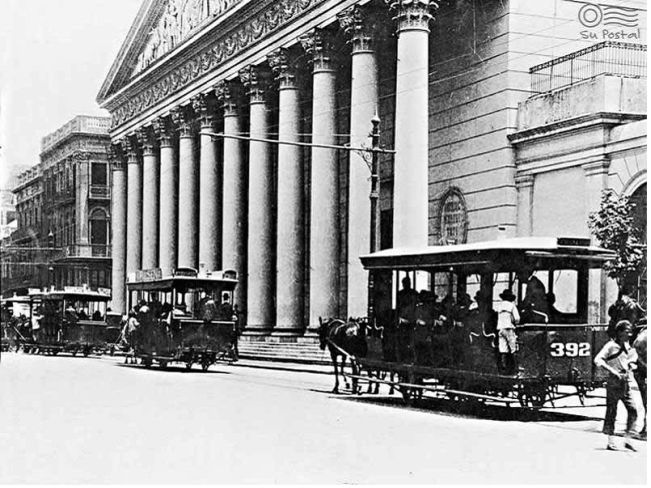
Horse-drawn trams in front of the Buenos Aires Metropolitan Cathedral.

The first horse-drawn trams began circulating the city in 1863 as a feeder service to the railways, taking passengers from Plaza de Mayo to the Retiro Terminal, where it connected to the Buenos Aires Northern Railway. A second similar horse-drawn feeder service was established between Monserrat and the Constitución railway terminal in 1866 to service the Buenos Aires Great Southern Railway.

The first urban tramways were inaugurated in 1870 by Argentine pioneer Federico Lacroze and his brother Julio. These two lines were the Lacroze brothers' Central Tramway (Tramway Central) and the Méndez brothers' Tramway 11 de Septiembre, which both ran parallel from Plaza de Mayo westwards to Plaza Miserere, currently the home of Once de Septiembre railway station. The tramways were first met with scepticism from the public, however by 1880 numerous other tram operators began to appear - such as the Anglo-Argentine Tramways Company - and the city would eventually emerge as having the largest tramway-to-population ratio in the world, gaining a global reputation for many decades as the "City of Trams". During this period, up until electrification, there was also an abundance of steam-powered trams which also gradually replaced the horse-drawn ones.

=== Electrification of the network ===
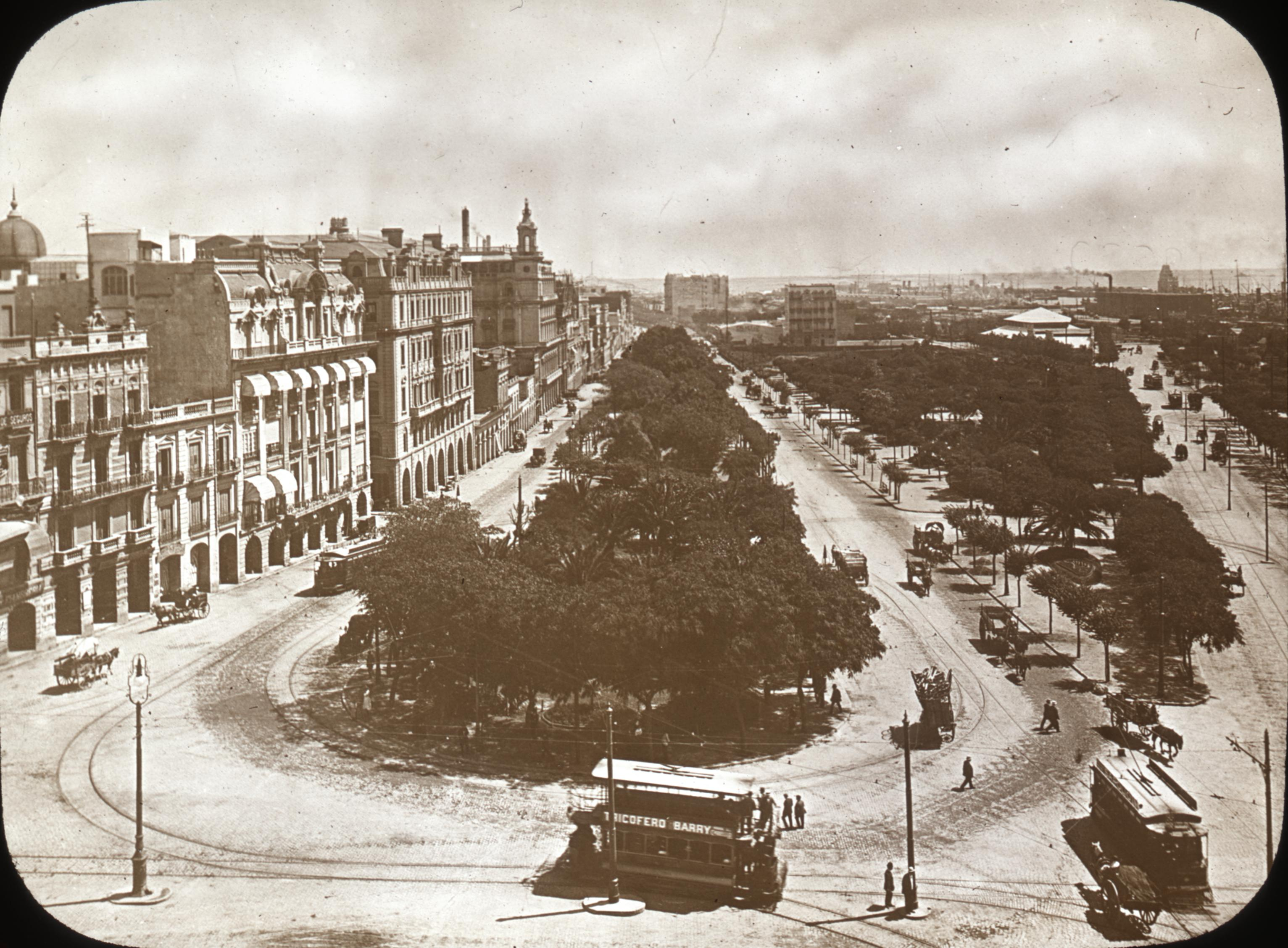
Electric trams circulating in Buenos Aires.

In 1880 Fyodor Pirotsky created the first electric tram in Saint Petersburg and Argentina opened its first electric tram in 1892 in the city of La Plata, south of Buenos Aires. Buenos Aires would not receive its first electric trams until 1897 when the North American engineer Charles Bright and the Argentine engineer Juan Mallol opened their "Buenos Ayres Electric Tramway" and "Tramways La Capital" lines in the city. These vehicles operated at 30 km/h, which was considered to be extremely fast for the time and led a journalist writing about an initial voyage to refer to the electric tram as "a furious vehicle that eats up the ground with its frightening speed". By 1914, the last of the horse-drawn trams were retired and the - now much larger - network was completely electrified.

The Belgian Compagnie Générale de Tramways de Buenos-Ayres took over the Anglo-Argentine Tramways Company in 1908 and standardised much of the network, though many Argentine companies such as the Lacroze Company remained. In the early 1900s the network expanded rapidly as a result of electrification and by the mid-1920s the system has reached its maximum extension of 875 km with 3,000 vehicles carrying 650 million passengers a year on 99 lines serviced by 12,000 employees. At the same time, some of the tramways began moving underground when the Anglo-Argentine Tramways Company opened the Buenos Aires Underground's Line A in 1913, becoming the first underground rail in Latin America, the southern hemisphere and the Spanish speaking world.

=== 20th Century ===
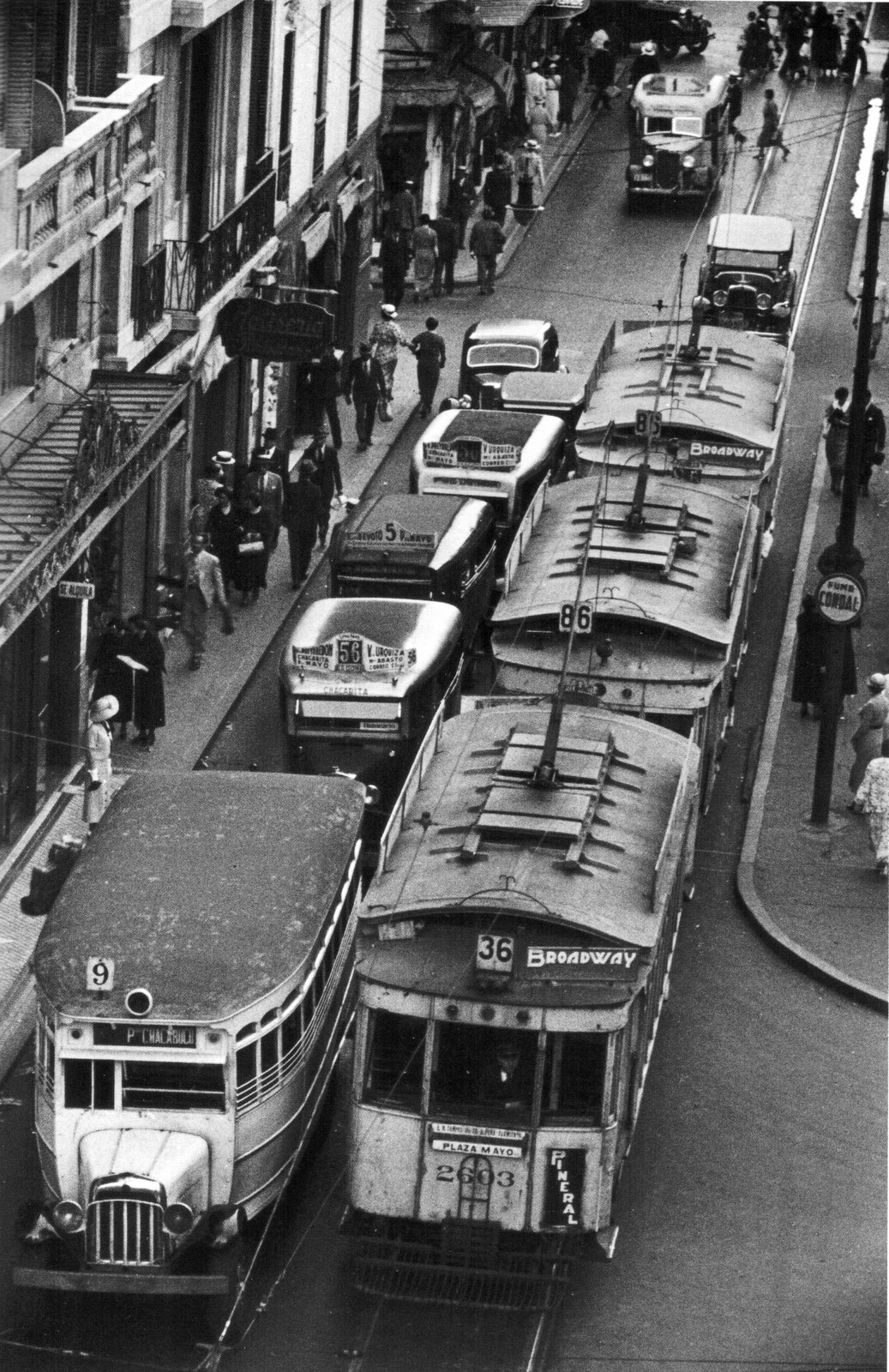
Buses competing with trams (1936).

In 1922 the first Colectivos (buses) began to appear in the city and by 1928 were competing fiercely with the trams, with many operators going as far as running their colectivos in front of the trams to try and steal their passengers. However, the trams did remain competitive, even going as far as offering a special "workers fare" in which people using trams from 5 until 7 in the morning could get a reduced fare at half the standard rate, something which was later abolished in 1949.

The network saw somewhat of a resurgence following the nationalisation of the country's railways in 1948, which also saw the creation of Transportes de Buenos Aires (TBA) which incorporated the city's trams and buses, while Subterráneos de Buenos Aires (SBA) managed the underground. Under this new administration, the network saw almost all the rails and overhead lines, as well as the rolling stock, almost completely replaced in the years from 1955 to 1961. At the same time, this period saw a significant increase in traffic, so much so that double-decker trams were re-incorporated into the network.

However, this resurgence and rapid growth of the network was to be short-lived, since in 1961 - under pressure from private interests threatened by what they perceived to be a state monopoly on public transport - the Argentine Congress passed a law which would see the dismantling of the network, citing "obsolescence as a means of transport" and TBA's budgetary deficit as motives. From 1961 to 1963 the system was gradually dismantled, despite what many saw as a golden age for the tramways.

The final trams ceased operating in February 1963, just a few days after the 100-year anniversary of the first tram in Buenos Aires. Most of the tram services saw direct replacements with the hundreds of buses purchased by the Government of Argentina from Leyland Motors.

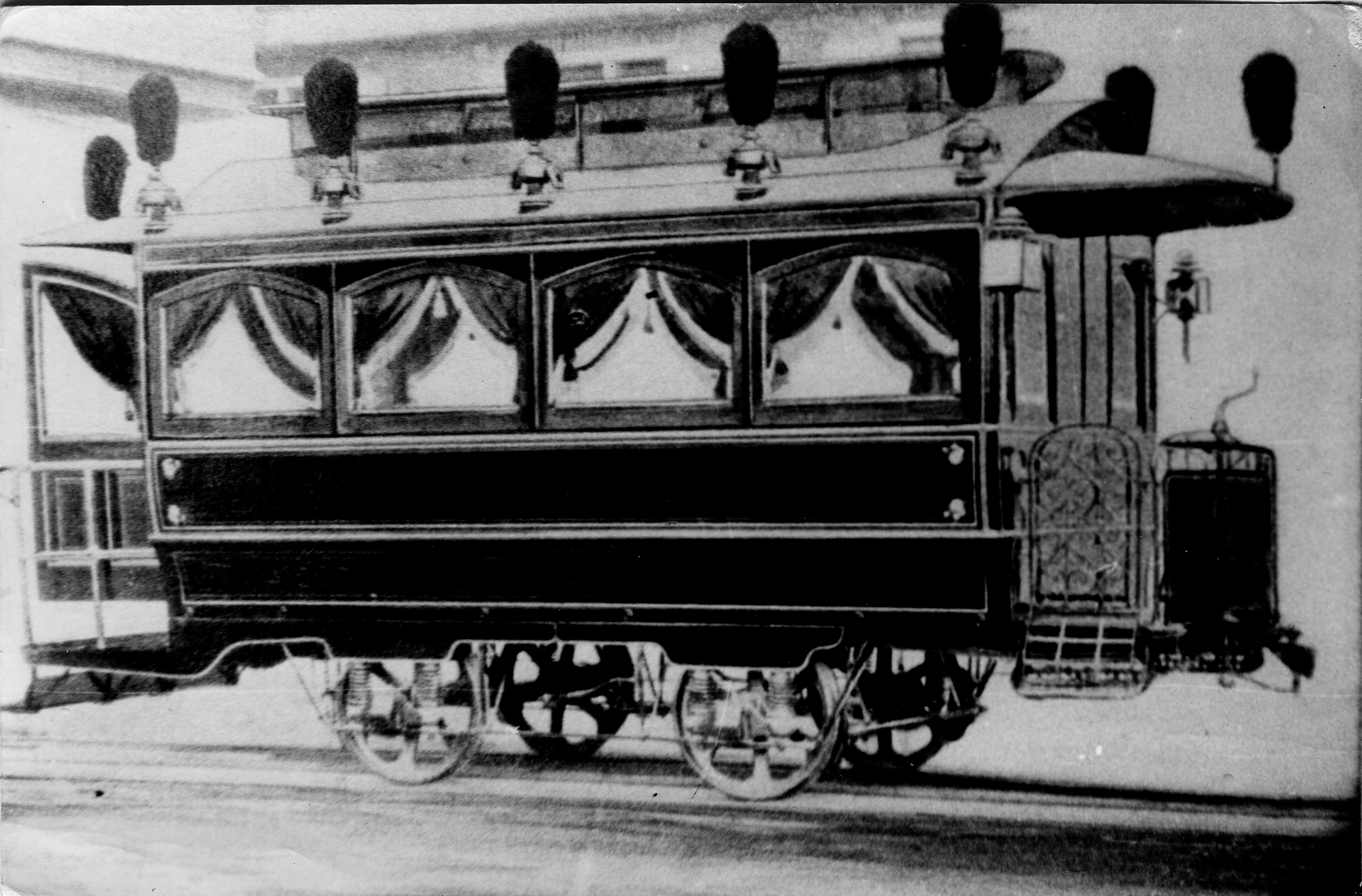
A Lacroze Company funeral tram

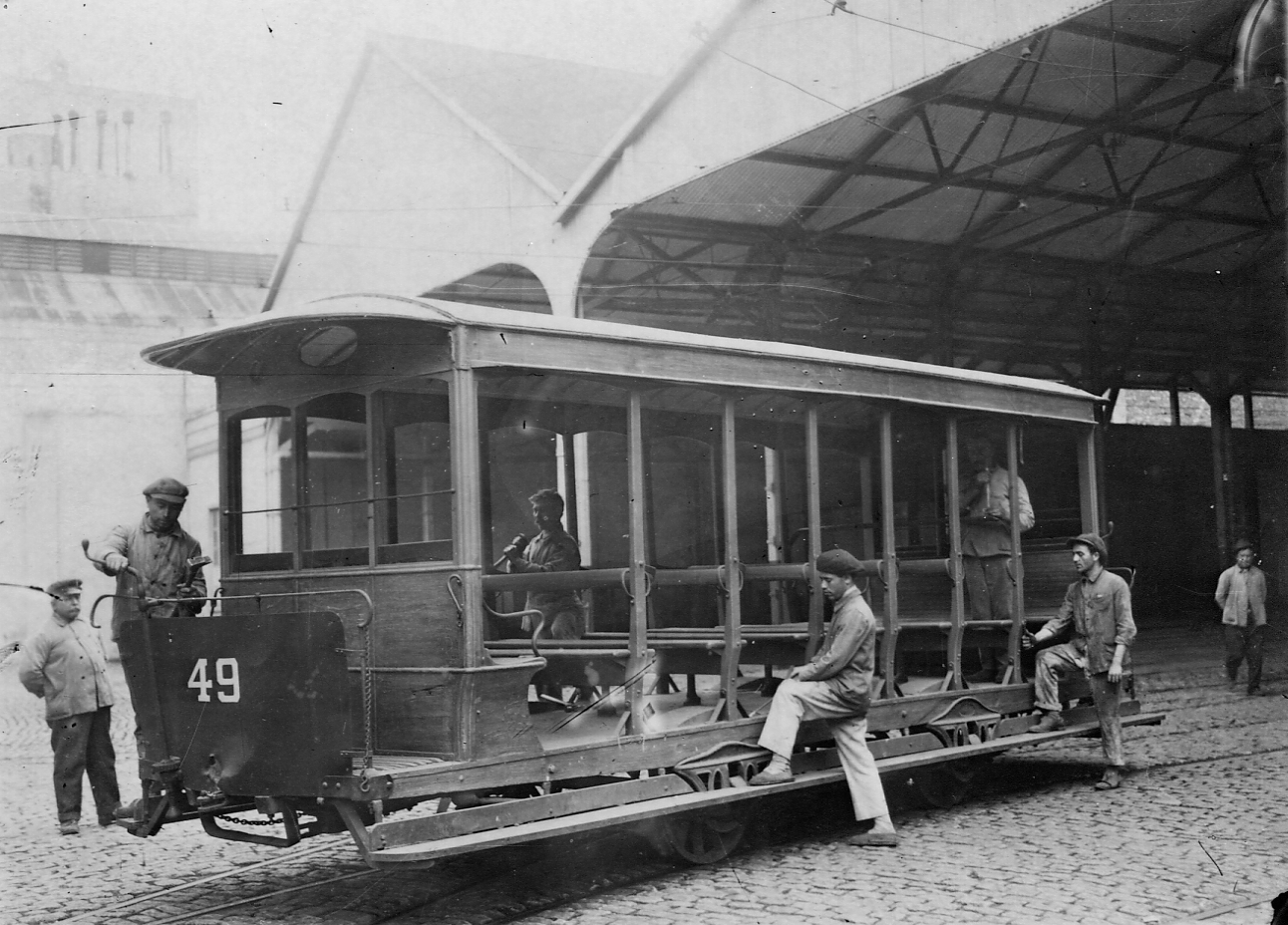
A Lacroze Company horse-drawn tram

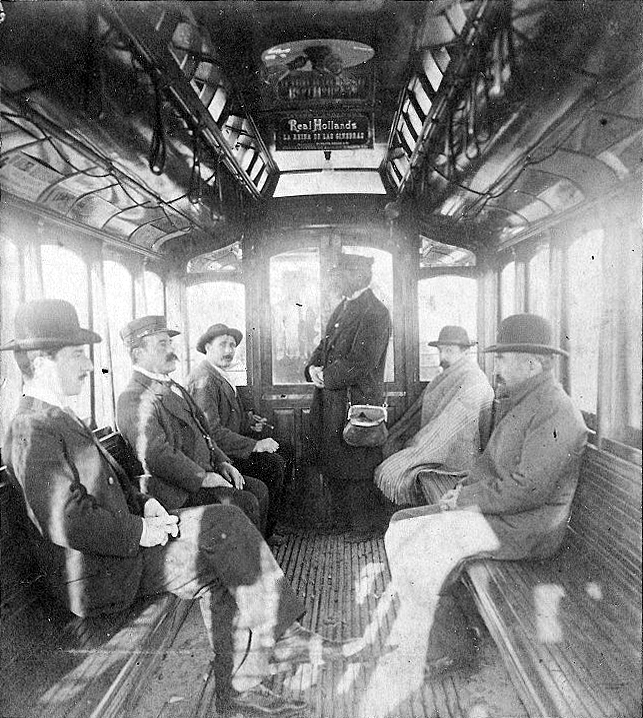
Passengers aboard early electric tram (1897)

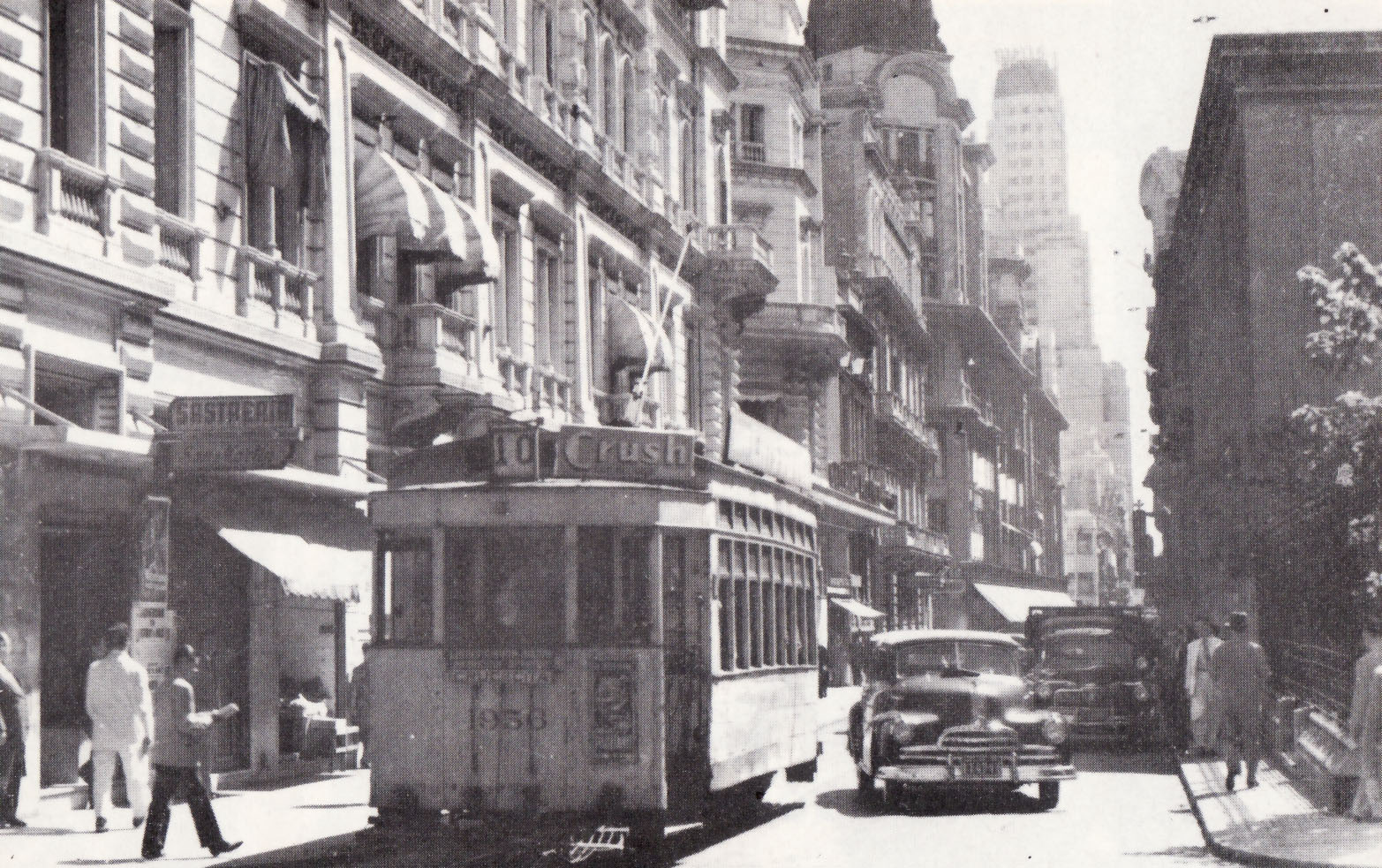
Electric tram (c.1940)

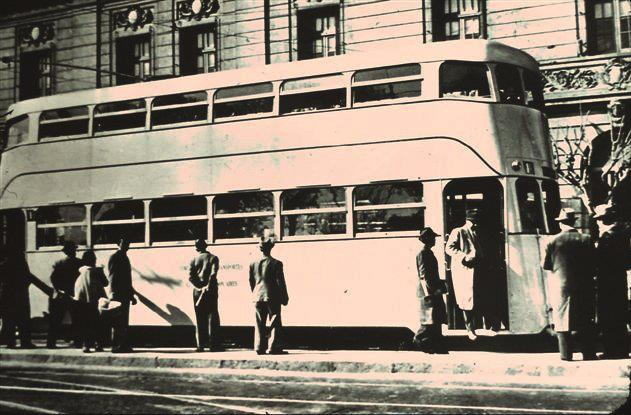
Double decker CATITA Imperial

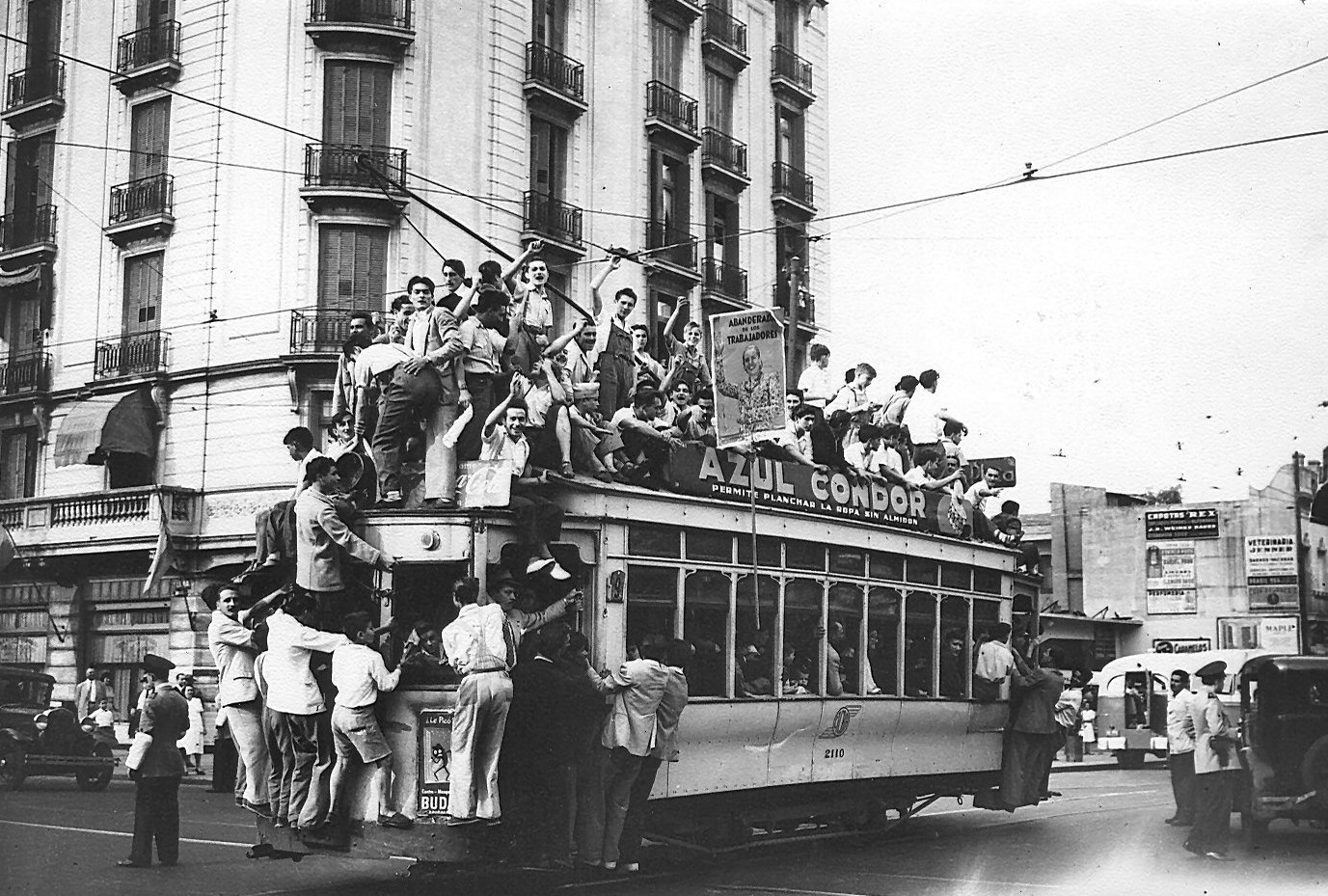
Workers celebrating the "birth of Peronism"

== PreMetro ==
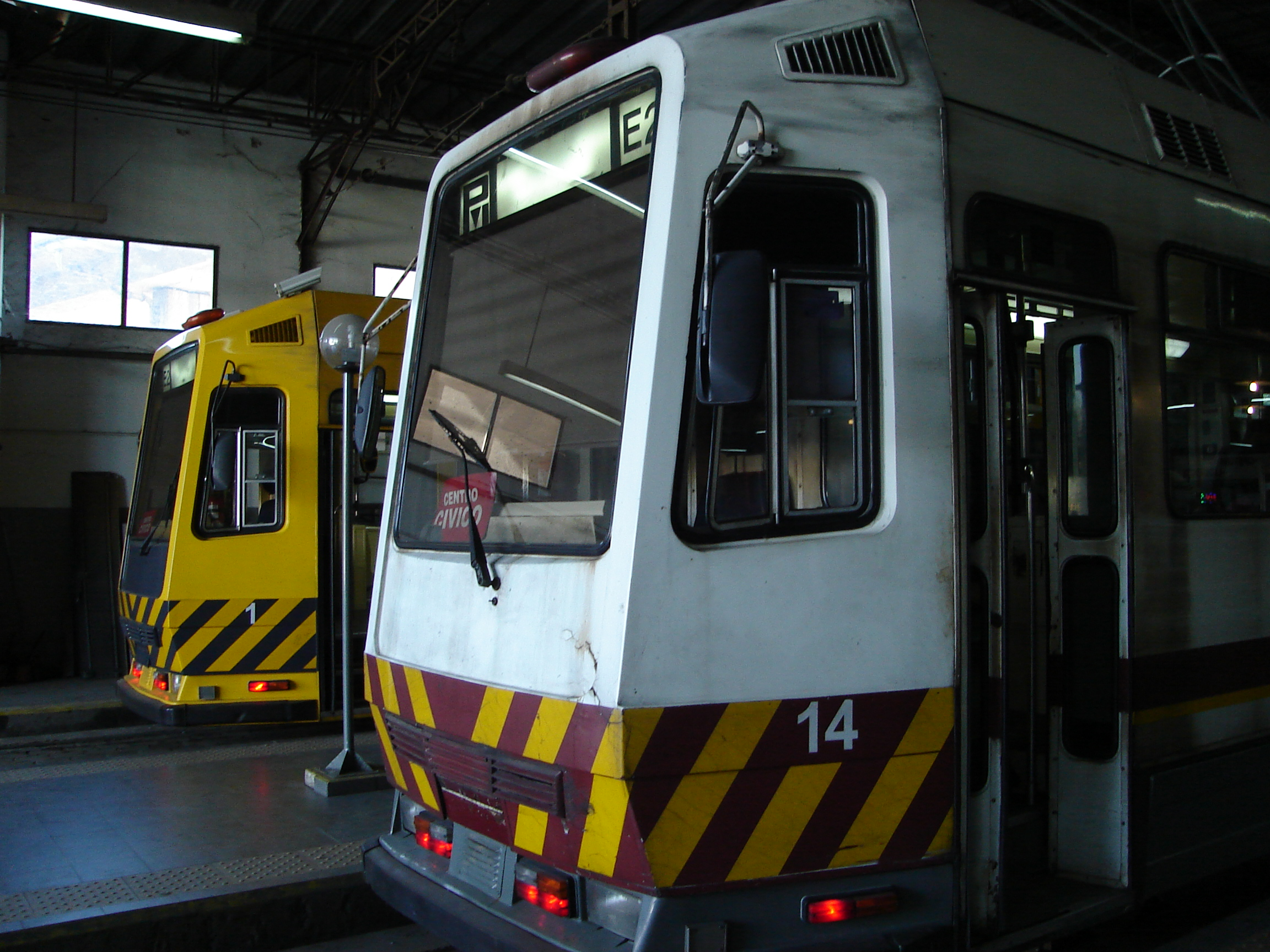
Original Materfer tram (foreground) with refurbished tram in the background.

The Buenos Aires PreMetro is a 7.4 km-long tram line which opened in 1987 with the intention of it functioning as a feeder service for Line E of the Buenos Aires Underground. It is currently operated by the private company Metrovías, who also operate the Underground and the Urquiza Line in the city. It uses Argentine-built Materfer trams, though for a brief period it used re-bodied La Brugeoise cars from the Underground while the Materfer trams were being constructed.

Originally there were supposed to be two PreMetro lines, however the second line (E1) was never built following the privatisation of the country's railways in the early 1990s. More recent plans to build the line (which, along with E2, would service some of the poorer parts of the city) were further thwarted after the construction of a MetroBus line to the south of the city. However, plans are underway to refurbish the existing E2 line, including the construction of a new terminal and the restoration of the line's stops.

== Heritage Tramway ==
A parade of trams to celebrate 150 years of trams in Buenos Aires.

Today, the Association of Friends of the Tramway (Spanish: Asociación Amigos del Tranvía) maintain and restore trams inside the Polvorín workshop in the neighborhood of Caballito. The Buenos Aires Historic Tramway is part of the city's heritage. The vehicle has been restored and preserved, allowing visitors to view the history of trams in the city.

Rides on this Historic Tramway of Caballito are free, and the tours are organized by the Association of Tramway Friends and Federico Lacroze Public Library. which also serves as the workshop for Line A of the Buenos Aires Underground.

The group formed in 1980 and runs a heritage tramway in the neighborhood, which often features jazz bands playing on the trams. The service is free and is open on Saturdays and Sundays and public holidays all year round from 4pm to 7.30pm. The tramway has many trams dating back as far as the early 1900s which are used on its 2 km circuit.

As part of the AAT's ongoing restoration and acquisition of more trams to add to its museum, it also acquired some La Brugeoise cars, which up until 2013 served Line A of the Underground, with the intention of restoring them and converting them to be used as trams, which was their original use before the Underground.

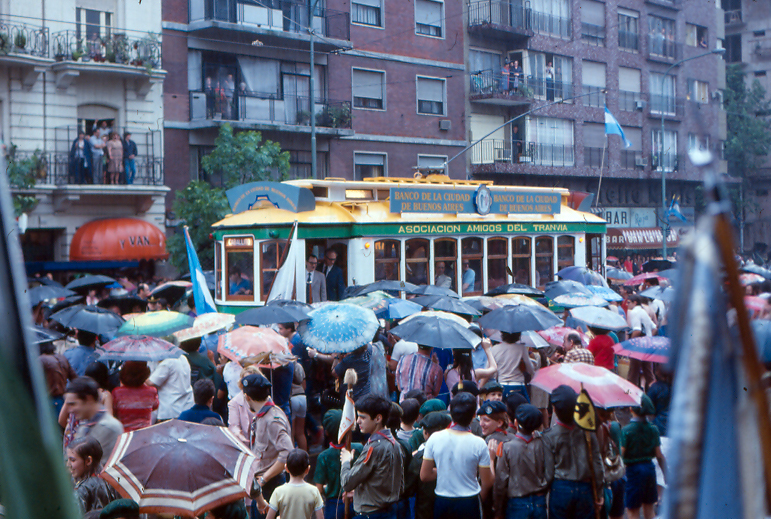
Inaugural heritage tramway trip in 1980

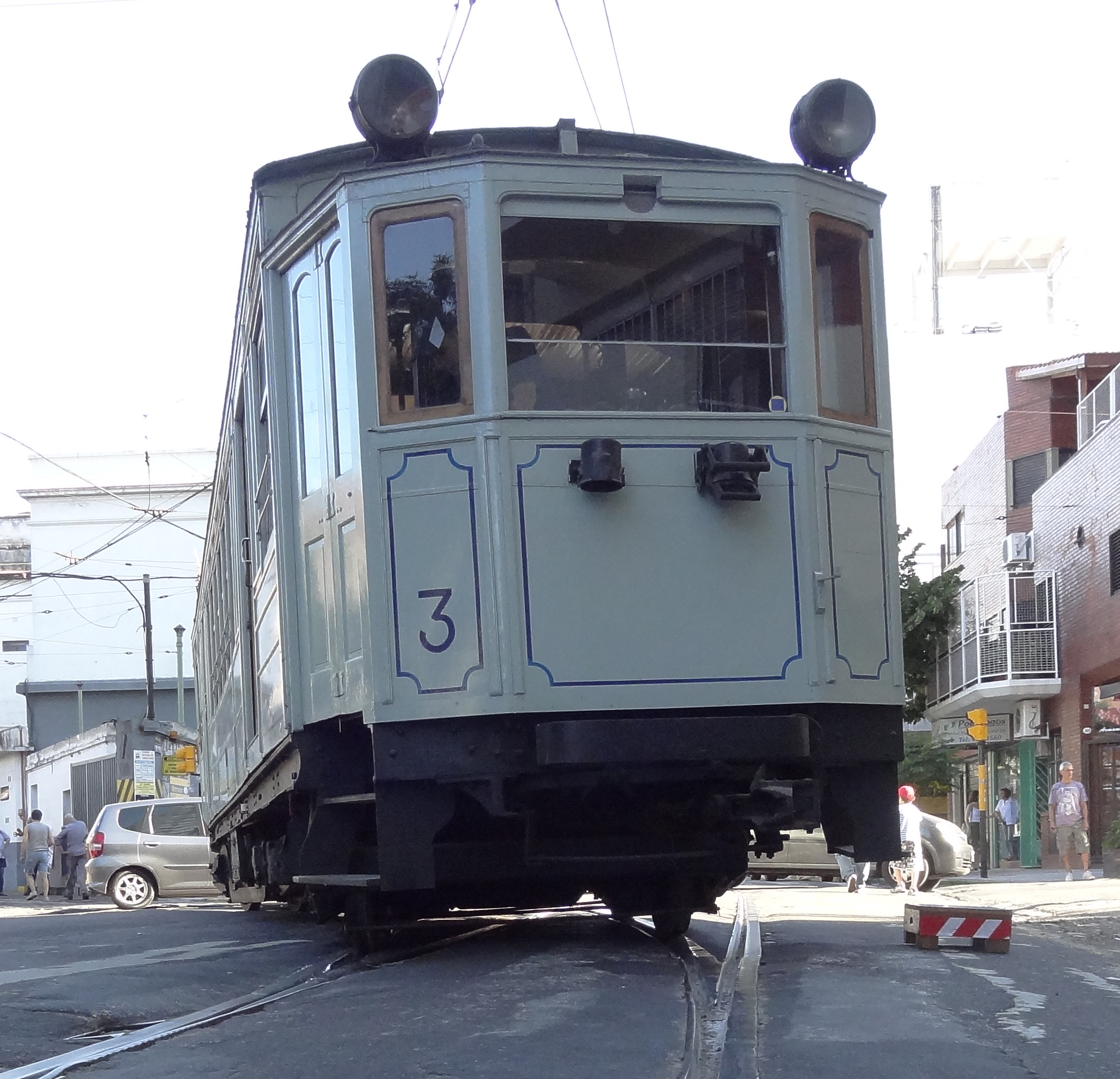
UEC Preston leaving the Polvorín workshop

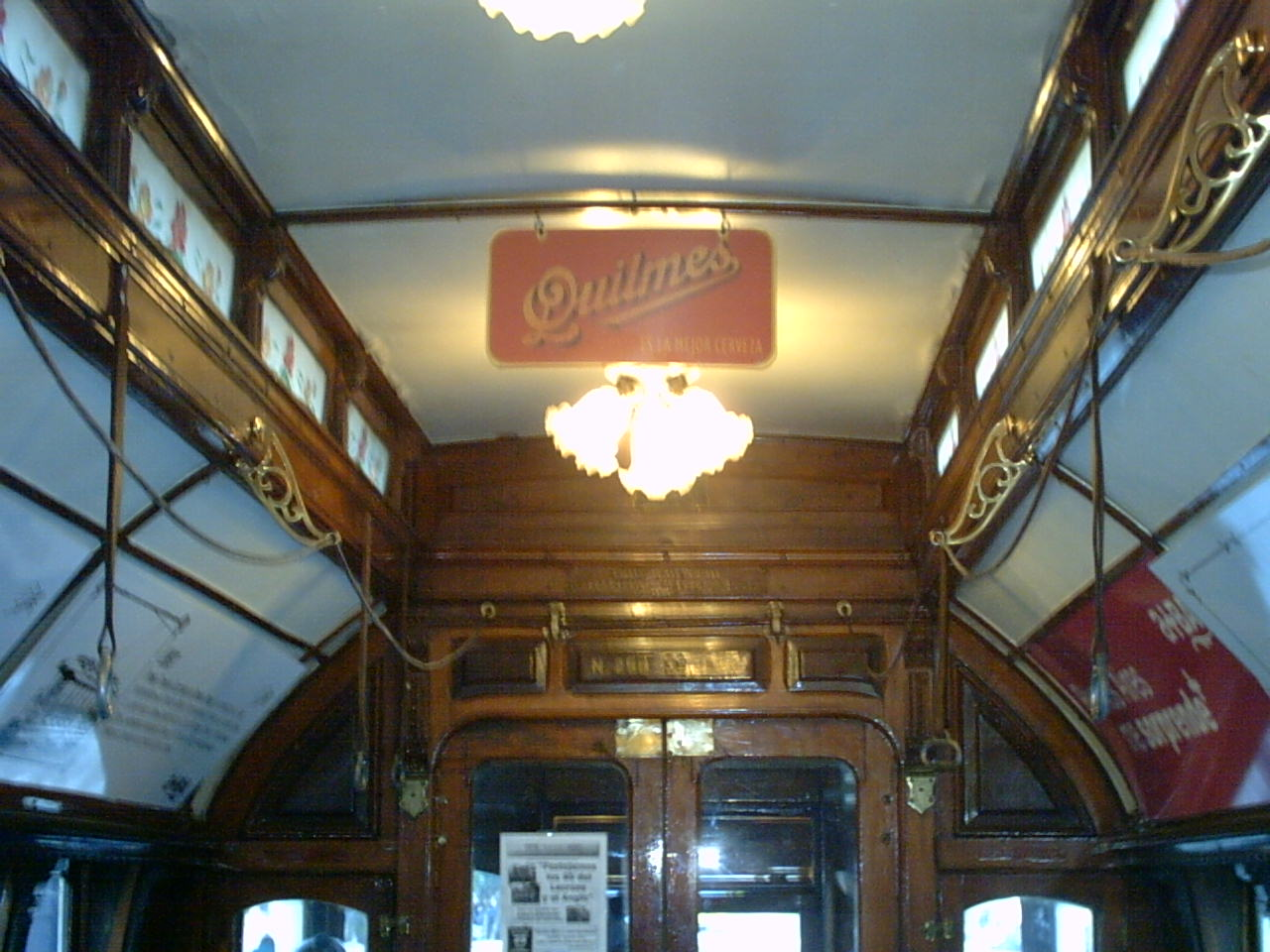
Interior of an AAT tram

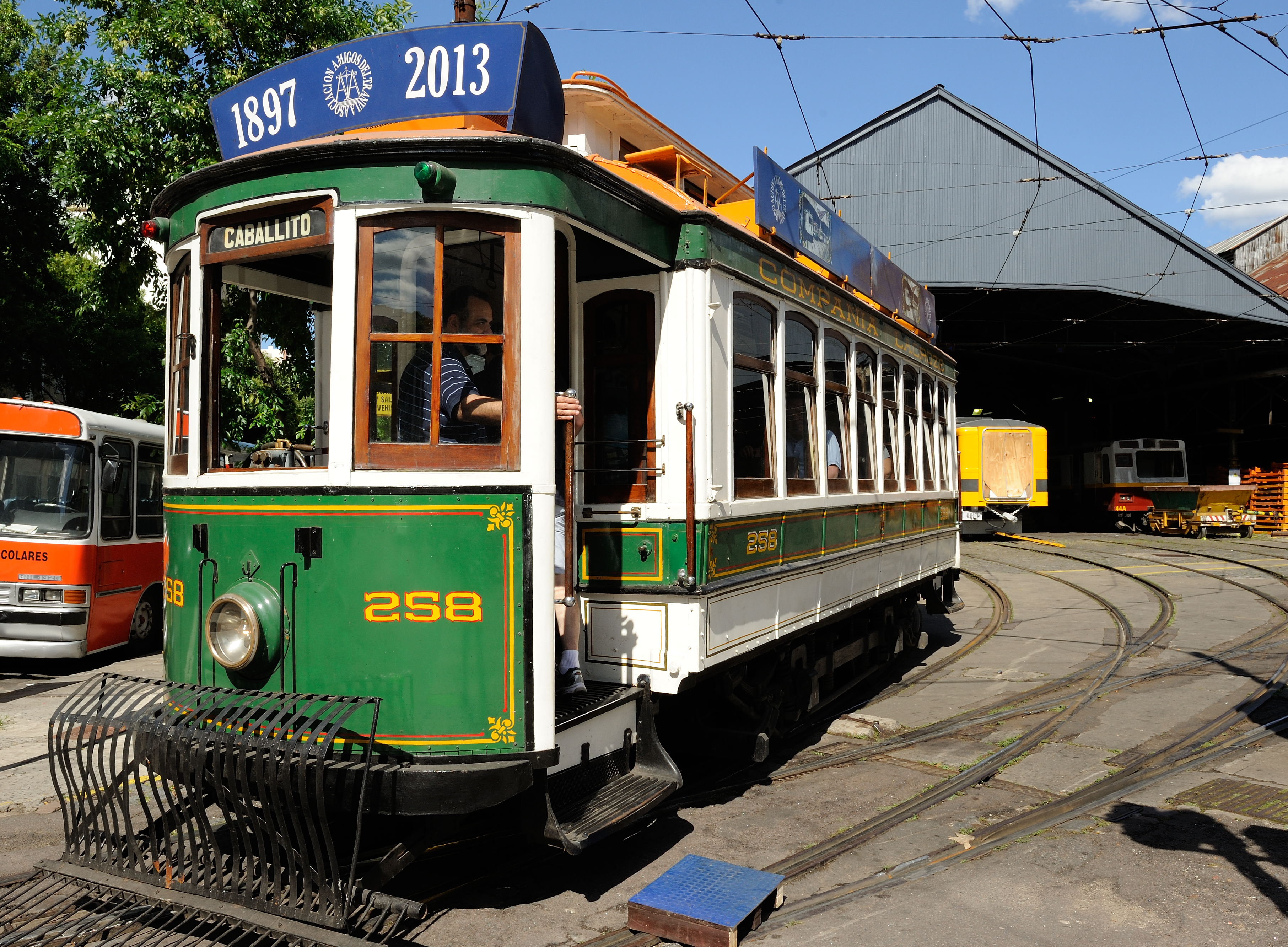
A 1927 tram at the Polvorín workshop

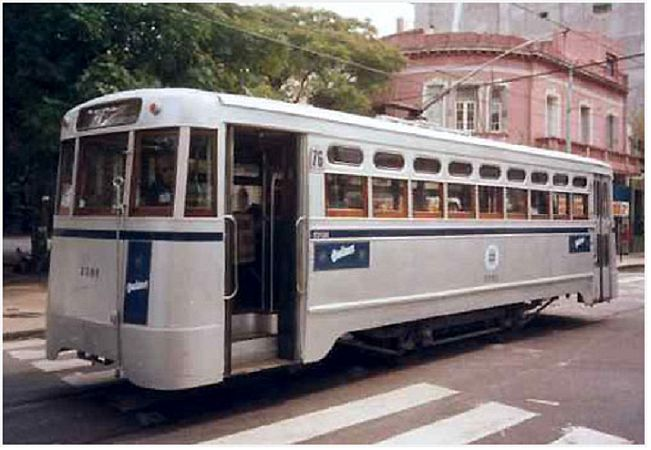
A 1950s Fabricaciones Militares tram

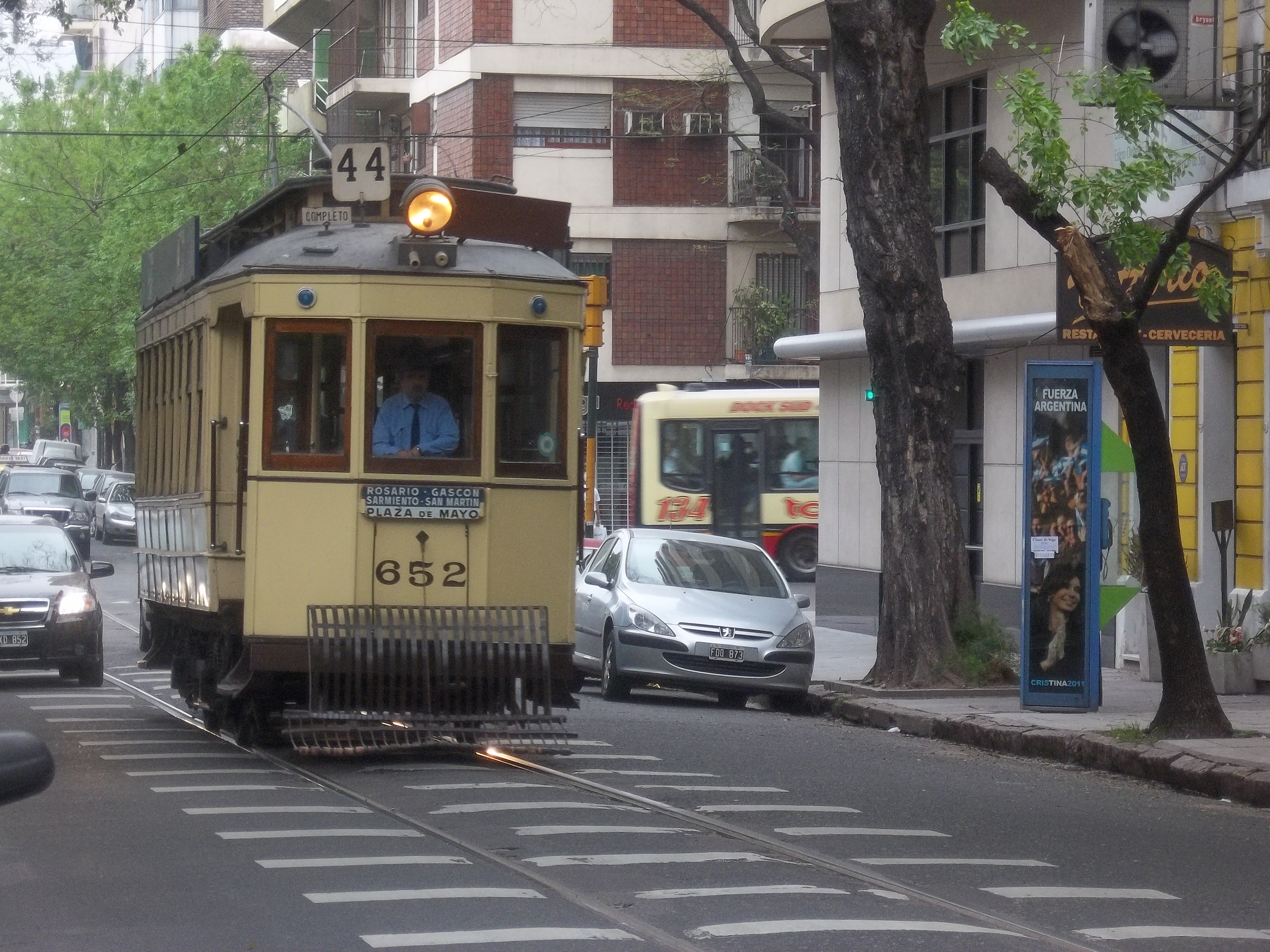
Tram in Caballito, Buenos Aires

== Other services ==
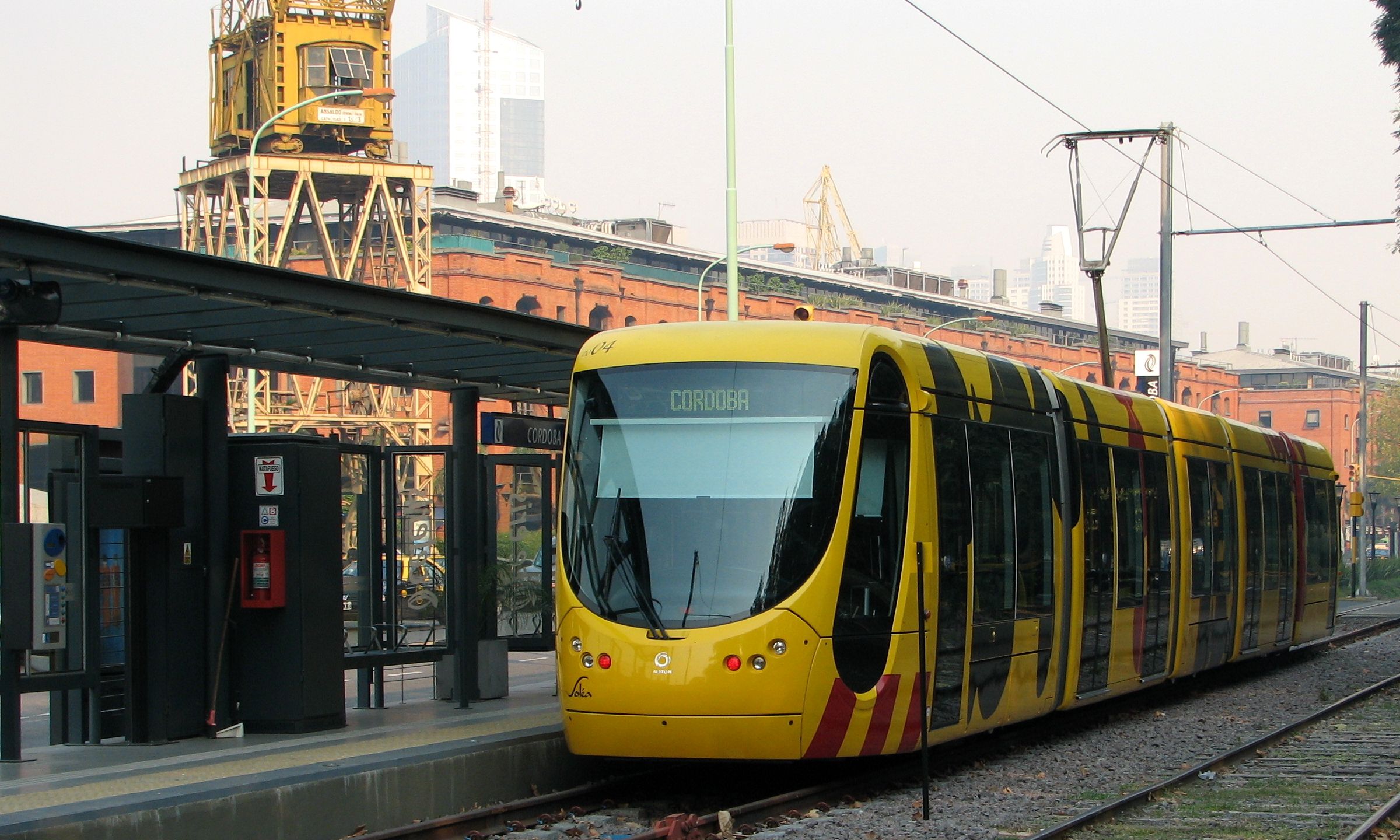
Puerto Madero Tramway.

The Puerto Madero Tramway was a tram which ran in Puerto Madero from 2007 to 2012 on a 2 km-long stretch with 4 stations. The tramway closed after experiencing low passenger numbers, largely due to the linear nature of the line which only operated in a sparsely populated part of the area. Extensions had been planned to the Retiro railway station and to La Boca, which would have added an extra 7 km to the line, however the plans were ultimately abandoned.

In Greater Buenos Aires the Tren de la Costa, which uses articulated CAF trams, was opened in 1995. It links to the General Mitre Railway in northern Buenos Aires and runs from Olivos to Tigre.

== See also ==
- Anglo-Argentine Tramways Company
- La Brugeoise cars
- Line A (Buenos Aires Underground)
- List of town tramway systems in Argentina
- Polvorín Workshop
- Rail transport in Argentina
- Trams in Rosario
