= SEMTUR =

- Parent: municipality of Rosario
- Founded: 2002
- Headquarters: Rosario, Santa Fe, Argentina
- Service type: bus service
- Routes: 20 (January 2014)
- Chief executive: Dr. C.P. Gustavo Héctor Perrone
- Website: www.semtur.com.ar

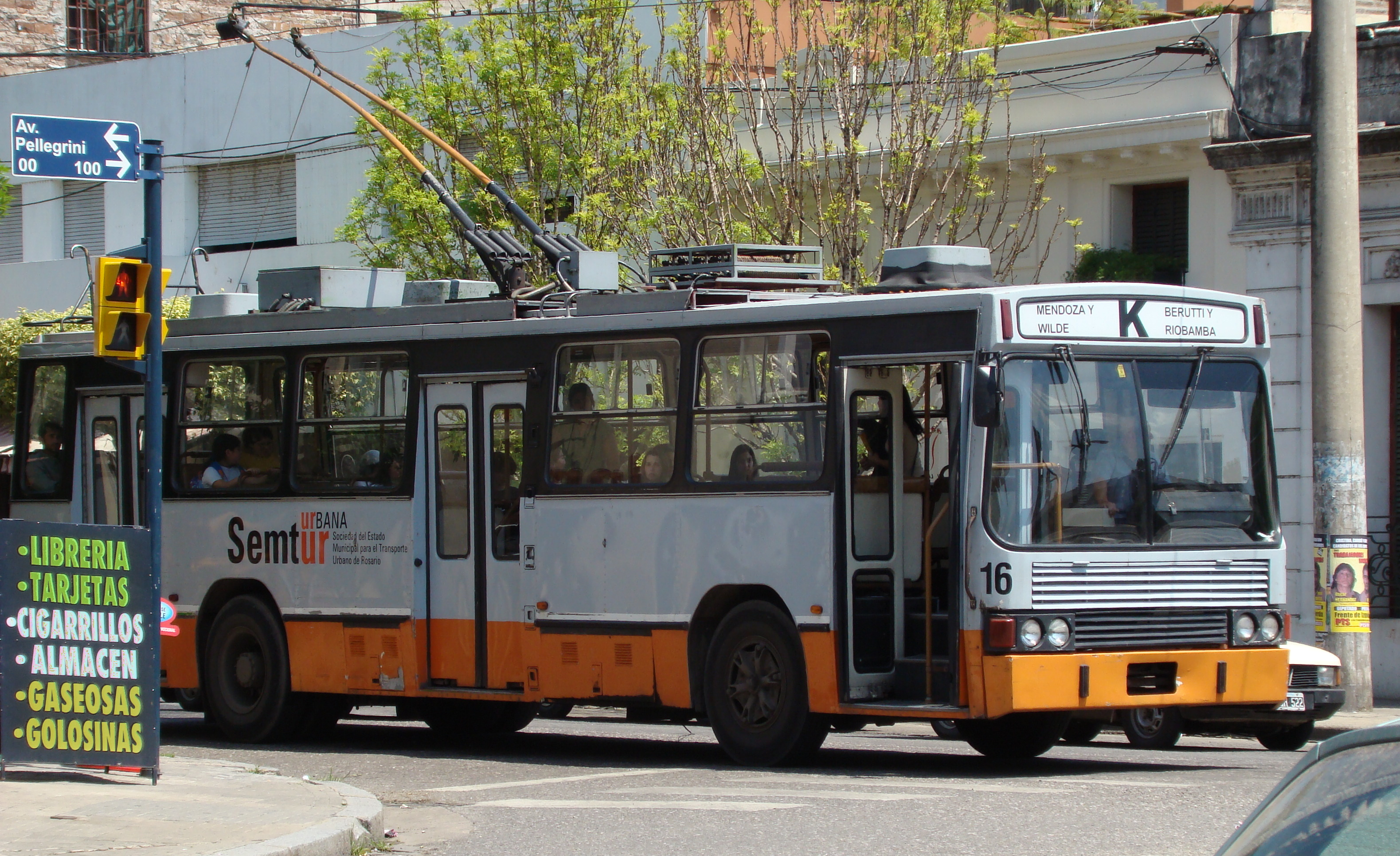
SEMTUR runs the only trolleybus line in Rosario.

SEMTUR (Sociedad del Estado Municipal para el Transporte Urbano de Rosario, "Municipal State Society for Rosario Urban Transport") was a government-owned corporation based in Rosario, province of Santa Fe, Argentina. It was managed by the municipality of Rosario and runs a number of urban bus lines, including the Rosario trolleybus system.

SEMTUR was created in 2002, after a private company which ran five bus lines had its authorization revoked due to deficient service. Though concessions for some of the lines were acquired by other companies, the other bids were left deserted. SEMTUR took over these and started renewing their fleet. This also had the effect of raising the standards for the competition.

As of 2014, the company operated twenty regular bus lines (113, 116, 120, 121, 122R, 122V 123, 133N, 133V, 134, 135, 136, 137 and Ronda del Centro), two intra-district lines (Enlace Noroeste and Enlace Sur), a special summer-season line to serve the northern coast and beaches of the city (Línea de la Costa), and a trolleybus line (Line "K"). SEMTUR's buses employed a light gray and orange horizontal colour pattern.
