= Trolleybuses in Rosario =

Transit system in Santa Fe, Argentina

Rosario trolleybus system
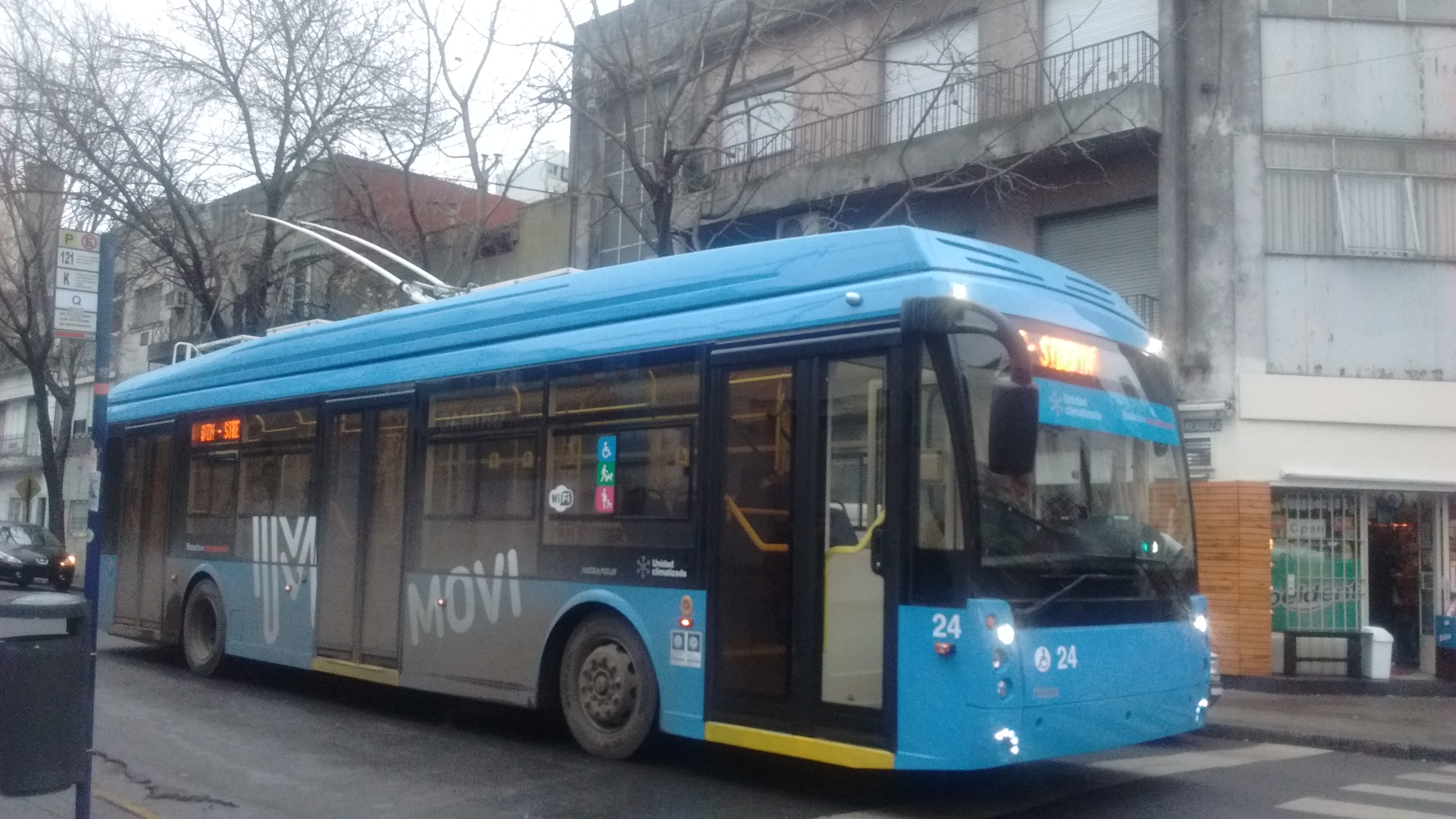
- A Trolza Megapolis trolleybus in service on Rosario's new line Q, in 2017

Operation
- Locale: Rosario, Argentina
- Open: 24 May 1959
- Status: Open
- Routes: 1 (line K)
- Operators: Movi Rosario (since 2019); Sociedad del Estado Municipal para el Transporte Urbano de Rosario (SEMTUR) (2004–2019); Ecobus (1994–2004); Empresa Martín Fierro, SRL (1979–1992); Municipality of Rosario (1959–1979)

Infrastructure
- Electrification: 600 V DC

Statistics
- Route length: 12.66 km (7.87 mi) (2026)
- Website: https://emr.gov.ar/ Mobility Site of Rosario Municipality (in Spanish)

The Rosario trolleybus system (Spanish: Sistema de trolebuses de Rosario) is part of the public transport network in Rosario, the largest city in the province of Santa Fe, Argentina.

Opened in 1959, the trolleybus system presently comprises one route, designated as line K. A second route Q operated between 2017 and 2023 using new Trolza Megapolis trolleybuses with traction batteries, and thus did not require any new overhead wires.

== History ==
=== Early years ===
The Rosario system opened on 24 May 1959. It replaced the old Rosario electric tramway network, which had been in existence since 1910. Initially, the system was operated by 10 German-made MAN trolleybuses. They worked the first line G, which linked the Plaza Sarmiento with the intersection of Avenida San Martín and Saavedra, where there was a mini terminal for connections to the south. Over time, the line was extended to the intersection between Salta and Paraguay, then to Calle San Nicolás, and, two years later, to the Mariano Moreno bus station.

In late 1959, 40 trolleybuses were acquired from the Italian Fiat - Alfa Romeo - CGE consortium. On 15 April 1960, line H was opened, with a route running from the Plaza Sarmiento to the city's northern boundary, with Granadero Baigorria. Between August and December 1961, brand new Fiat trolleybuses arrived in Rosario, allowing network expansion with the creation of new lines. To reinforce the line H service, line J was opened in September 1961, and linked Plaza Sarmiento with Plaza Alberdi.

On 3 December 1961, line K began operating, from the corner of Necochea and Avenida Pellegrini to the corner of Mendoza and Nicaragua. Its fleet was composed entirely of Fiat units.

As with line H, line K experienced strong demand, which led to the opening of line L on 8 January 1962. Line L connected Pellegrini and Necochea with Bv. Avellaneda and Mendoza. At the request of residents, it was extended in 1964 to the corner of Paraná and 9 de Julio, in front of the Rosario Oeste railway station of the Ferrocarril General Manuel Belgrano.

In 1967, to optimize fleet utilization, lines G and J were merged, and line M opened to connect San Martín and Muñoz with the Santa Fe–Cafferata bus terminal. Following these changes, lines M, H and K were operating with 45 trolleybuses in total.

=== Decline ===
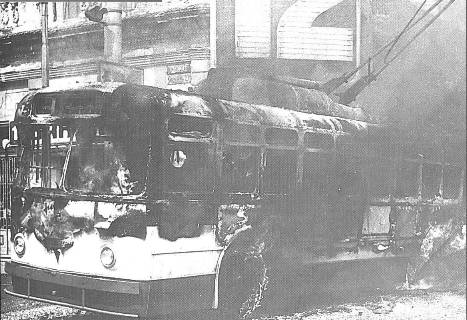
Fiat trolleybus burnt during the Rosariazo.

On 16 September 1969, during the protest movement known as the Rosariazo, eight Fiat vehicles were destroyed, and three MAN and 14 other vehicles were damaged to varying degrees. Following these events, services on line H were suspended, because the 32 surviving units could only cover the requirements of lines K and M.

In 1970, 23 Mercedes-Benz trolleybuses manufactured in 1953–54 were acquired, 12 from the transport company of Buenos Aires, where the trolleybus system had closed in 1964, and 11 from the Mendoza trolleybus system, where they had been withdrawn from service in 1963 and subsequently stored. The arrival of these 23 units enabled the reintroduction of services on line H in 1971. Two additional used Mercedes-Benz trolleybuses were acquired a few years later, these being ones also built around 1954 for a planned system in the city of Bahía Blanca that was built in 1957 but never opened, and this brought the total number of Mercedes-Benz trolleybuses in Rosario's fleet to 25.

In 1979, during the military dictatorship (1976–1983), the trolleybus system was privatised. The new operator was Empresa Martín Fierro SRL (the Martin Fierro Company, or EMF). Only two trolleybus routes were still operating at that time, K and M. Route H reopened in March 1980, but it was merged with route M on 10 September 1980. EMF began rebuilding some of the trolleybuses.

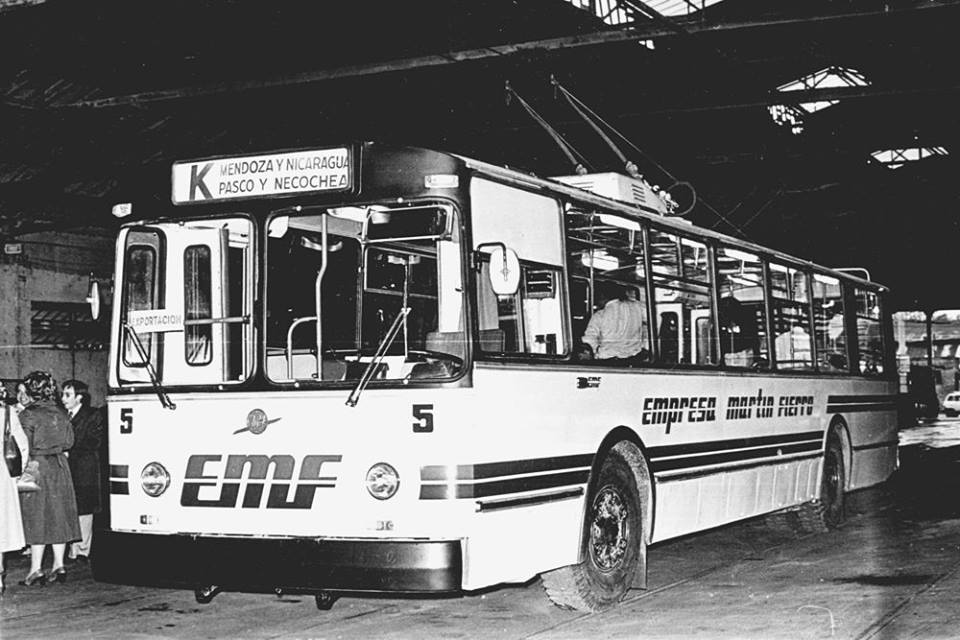
Rosario's first Russian-built ZIU trolleybus when brand new, in 1980

Around May 1980, concessionaire EMF acquired five large Soviet ZiU trolleybuses with three doors, but these vehicles had been poorly maintained, and were in service in Rosario for a very short time before being scrapped in 1984. During their limited time in service, they nevertheless created a favorable impression, due to their size and interior capacity, and air suspension. They had a front entrance door and two exit doors: one in the middle and another at the rear of the vehicle. Shortly after being put into service, the middle door was closed off.

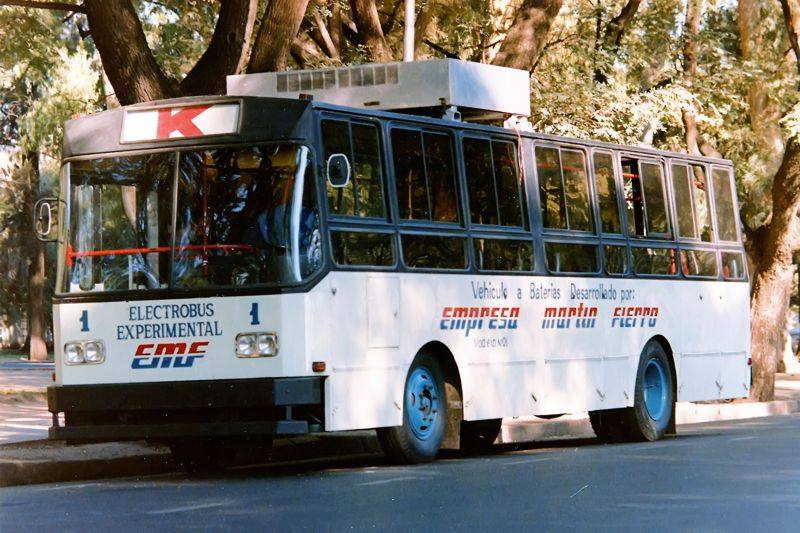
EMF battery bus No. 1, an experimental vehicle, in 1982. This bus was converted into a trolleybus, No. 24, in 1983.

Rebuilding of older vehicles was not found to be cost-effective, and EMF instead proceeded to construct a fleet of new trolleybuses, using new chassis purchased from Mercedes-Benz Argentina, new bodies constructed in EMF's own workshops, and electrical equipment recycled from old Mercedes-Benz trolleybuses withdrawn in the 1970s. A total of 15 such vehicles were built, in 1980–1983 (numbered 10–24).

Trolleybus service on line M (composed of former lines H and M) ended on 3 November 1984, its trolleybuses being transferred to line K. This left only route K, which was 10.2 km (6.3 mi) in length, in operation.

After a long series of vicissitudes and mismanagement by the private concessionaire, the trolleybuses on the system were declining in quality of service and maintenance. They had been gradually replaced by diesel-powered units, and one of two the two trolleybus lines had been converted to buses.

On 31 December 1992, trolleybus service ceased on line K, the last Rosario trolleybus line still in operation, after the municipal transport authority revoked the Martín Fierro Company's concession for the service. Only four trolleybuses were active at the time. The EMF-built vehicles were placed in storage, and eventually were scrapped.

=== Revival ===
Following a new call for tenders, the concession to operate line K was awarded in late November 1992 to a joint venture (Spanish: Unión Transitoria de Empresas (UTS)) composed of Capse SA (public lighting concessionaire) and Molino Blanco SRL (concessionaire of urban passenger transport lines 133 and 143). The joint venture then went on to be called Eco-Bus. Its concession was for a 15-year term, with an option for 5 more years.

The concessionaires were required to operate 20 trolleybuses, renovate feeder substations and make good the overhead wire network. They were also expected to extend the route network: Ciudad Universitaria at one end and Mendoza and Wilde at the other; the latter was only partially realised initially, as far as Calle Sánchez de Loria. Initially, the joint venturers were granted a period of 180 days to begin operating new trolleybuses, but that period had to be extended.

The new trolleybuses arrived in late 1993 in the form of 20 units with Volvo chassis, bodywork by Brazil's Marcopolo and electrical equipment by Powertronics. Although technically second-hand vehicles, having been manufactured in 1987 for a planned trolleybus system in Belo Horizonte, Brazil, that ultimately was never completed and opened, they had been stored continuously since the cancellation of the Belo Horizonte project and thus, effectively, were new vehicles when they arrived in Rosario. During the 1993 suspension of trolleybus service, construction of the planned extensions proceeded, east to Ciudad Universitaria and west to Calle Sánchez de Loria.

After a suspension of more than a year, the trolleybus system reopened on 25 January 1994, now with an entirely new fleet, a new operator (Ecobus) and extended at both ends of the single route, still line K, which now operated from Ciudad Universitaria to the intersection of Calle Mendoza and Calle Sánchez de Loria. The new trolleybuses entered service still wearing the red-and-cream livery they had been given when built, for Belo Horizonte, but this was short-lived. In the second quarter of 1994, the entire fleet was repainted into a modified livery with green replacing red along the skirt of each vehicle and green also applied to the roof-mounted equipment.

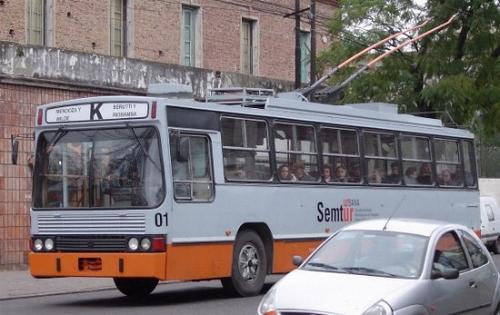
One of the Marcopolo/Volvo trolleybuses that entered service in 1994, seen here after repainting in SEMTUR livery in 2005

On 15 July 2003, route K was extended farther at its west end, by around 500 metres, to a roundabout at Bulevar Wilde, making its overall length 12.6 km end-to-end.

After more than a decade of operations, and following the crisis of 2002, Ecobus declared bankruptcy due to an inability to pay workers' arrears. Trade union disputes coupled with a poor relationship between the concessionaire and the municipality were the triggers for the termination of the concession in October 2004. On the 25th of that month, line K passed back into municipal control through Sociedad del Estado Municipal para el Transporte Urbano de Rosario (SEMTUR).

By June 2005, about half of the fleet of 20 trolleybuses had been repainted in SEMTUR's grey and orange colors. During the same month, one trolleybus that had been damaged by fire in 1995 and been in storage ever since, returned to service after being repaired by SEMTUR. Eventually, the fleet was recomposed with 14 units operating the Semtur service in place of the 20 that had comprised the whole fleet.

=== Expansion ===
In 2017, the first major expansion to the system in many years took place, with the opening of new line Q: Ciudad Universitaria – Centro Municipal de Distrito Sudoeste "Emilia Bertolé". Of the new route's 12.8 km (8.0 mi) length, half is shared with line K. Line Q's 5.7 km (3.5 mi) other half (along Avenida Francia) lacks any overhead wires, and to serve it, SEMTUR placed an order in March 2016 with the Russian manufacturer Trolza for 12 "Megapolis"-model trolleybuses capable of operating in regular service away from the trolleybus wires part of the time. The choice of manufacturer and model was influenced by the fact that another Argentine trolleybus system, the Córdoba system, had recently purchased the same type of trolleybuses; they entered service in February 2016.

Although new line Q did not require any new overhead wires, the project did require the purchase and installation of four additional traction substations. The 12 Trolza trolleybuses were delivered between mid-April 2017 and mid-May 2017. A public ceremony to celebrate the "inauguration" of new line Q was held on 13 July 2017, with all 12 new trolleybuses on display, and service began on 14 July.

Line Q was discontinued in January 2023 due to the traction batteries overheating on hot summer days. It was reinstated in May, but discontinued again, this time permanently, in December 2023.

In May 2019 a new trolleybus model called REBUS, built locally from a Tatsa Puma D12 diesel bus, was presented to the public. Between 2022 and 2025 further 14 trolleybuses were built using bodies of Metalpar Iguazu diesel buses. They are the result of a cooperation between Movi Rosario, National University of Rosario and technology company Inventu.

== Routes ==
The system currently comprises one route, designated as Line K (12.6 km long).

- K: Ciudad Universitaria – Bulevar Wilde

== Fleet ==
=== Past fleet ===
In the past, the fleet of the Rosario trolleybus system included the following vehicles at one time or another:

- 21 M.A.N. model MKE 3, with bodies by Kässbohrer or Rathgeber and Kiepe Elektrik propulsion; built 1953 for the Buenos Aires trolleybus system, acquired secondhand by Rosario in 1959 (Nos. 101–121).
- 40 Alfa Romeo/Fiat with CGE electrical equipment, built new in 1960–61 for Rosario (Nos. 1–40).
- 25 Mercedes-Benz/Kiepe, built 1953; acquired secondhand by Rosario and mostly entered service in 1971 (Nos. 41–65); 12 had been built for Buenos Aires, 11 for the Mendoza trolleybus system and the last two (Nos. 64–65) for a planned trolleybus system in Bahía Blanca that was built but never opened. Some of the 11 vehicles acquired from Mendoza may have also originally been purchased for the cancelled Bahía Blanca trolleybus system.
- 5 ZIU model ZIU-682B (alternatively known as ZIU-9), built 1980 by the Uritsky Factory in Engels, USSR (Nos. 5–9).
- 15 Martín Fierro-built trolleybuses on new Mercedes-Benz 1214 chassis, fitted with recycled electrical equipment, built in 1980–82, except for the 15th and last (No. 24), converted from a battery bus in 1983. These were relatively short trolleybuses, with chassis measuring only 7.7 metres (25 ft) in length (except No. 24, slightly longer).

The last use of any of the old Mercedes-Benz trolleybuses occurred in June 1980. The last active MAN trolleybuses were three units that had been rebodied by Martín Fierro in 1980 (Nos. 114, 118, and 121, renumbered 2–4), but the last of these was withdrawn in 1984. As mentioned in a previous section, the five ZIU-682 trolleybuses, built in 1980, were used in service for only around three years before being withdrawn. Martín Fierro also rebodied one of the Fiat vehicles (original No. 12, renumbered 1, later 20), but it was retired by late 1984. The last unrebodied Fiat (No. 25) was withdrawn with the conversion of line M to buses, on 4 November 1984.

==== Preserved ====
One of the Fiats, No. 11 (ex-39), was preserved and kept in indoor storage by the municipal authorities after the retirement of the last such units, and it was promised that the local railfan group, the Asociación Rosarina Amigos del Riel (Rosarian Association of Railfans), would be allowed to restore it. Because of a lack of funding, the start of restoration work was delayed for many years, but finally got under way in May 2010 and was completed in April 2011. The 1961-built trolleybus was fully restored to operating condition and historic paint scheme and was given its original fleet number, 39.

Marcopolo No. 08 has also been designated for eventual preservation as a historic trolleybus, and for this reason SEMTUR intentionally excluded it from a 2010–11 program under which all 19 others of the type were rebuilt by ArMar Carrocerías. No. 08 remained in regular passenger service until November 2025.

=== Current fleet ===
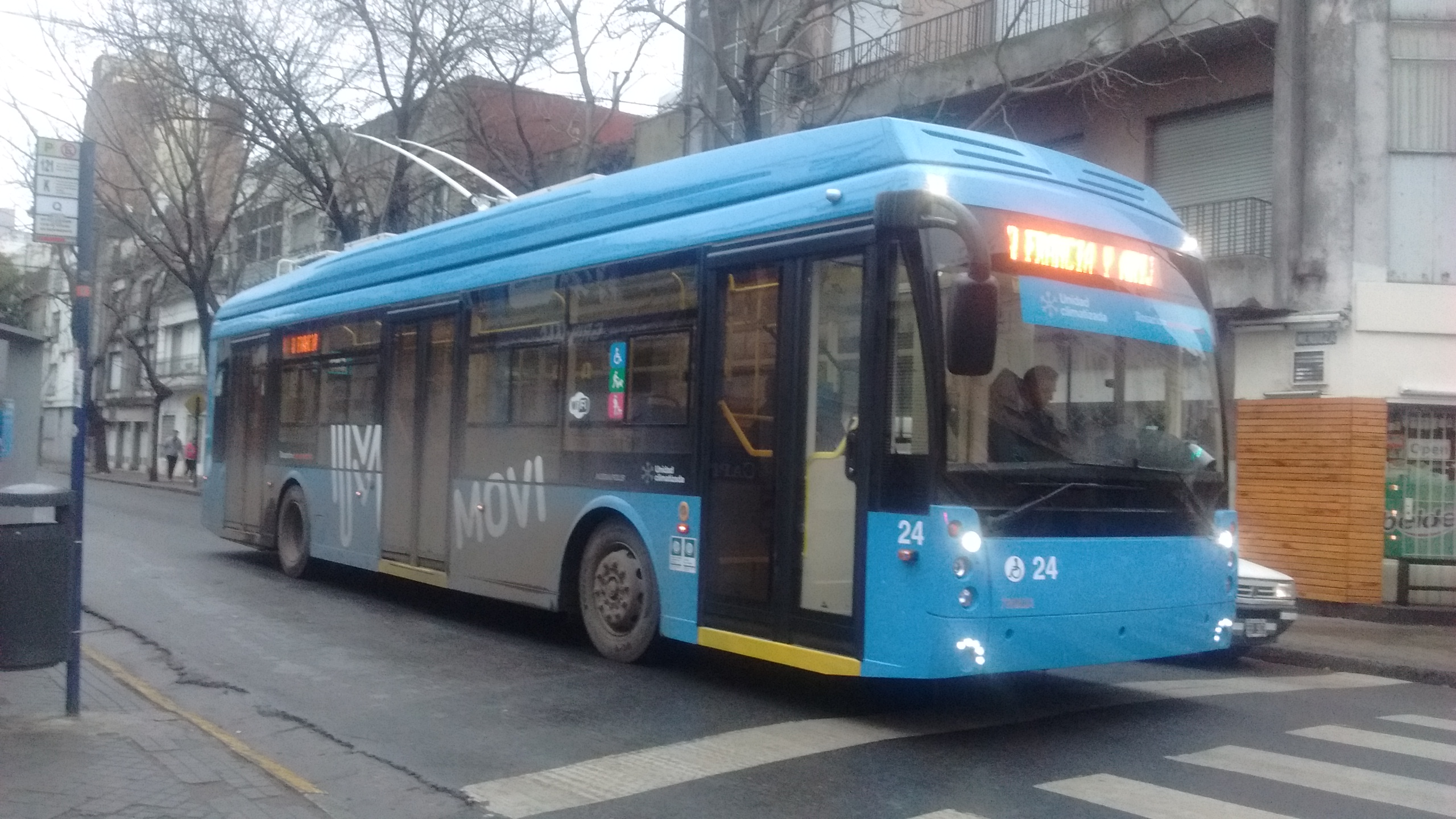
Trolza "Megapolis" trolleybus No. 24 on line Q in 2017

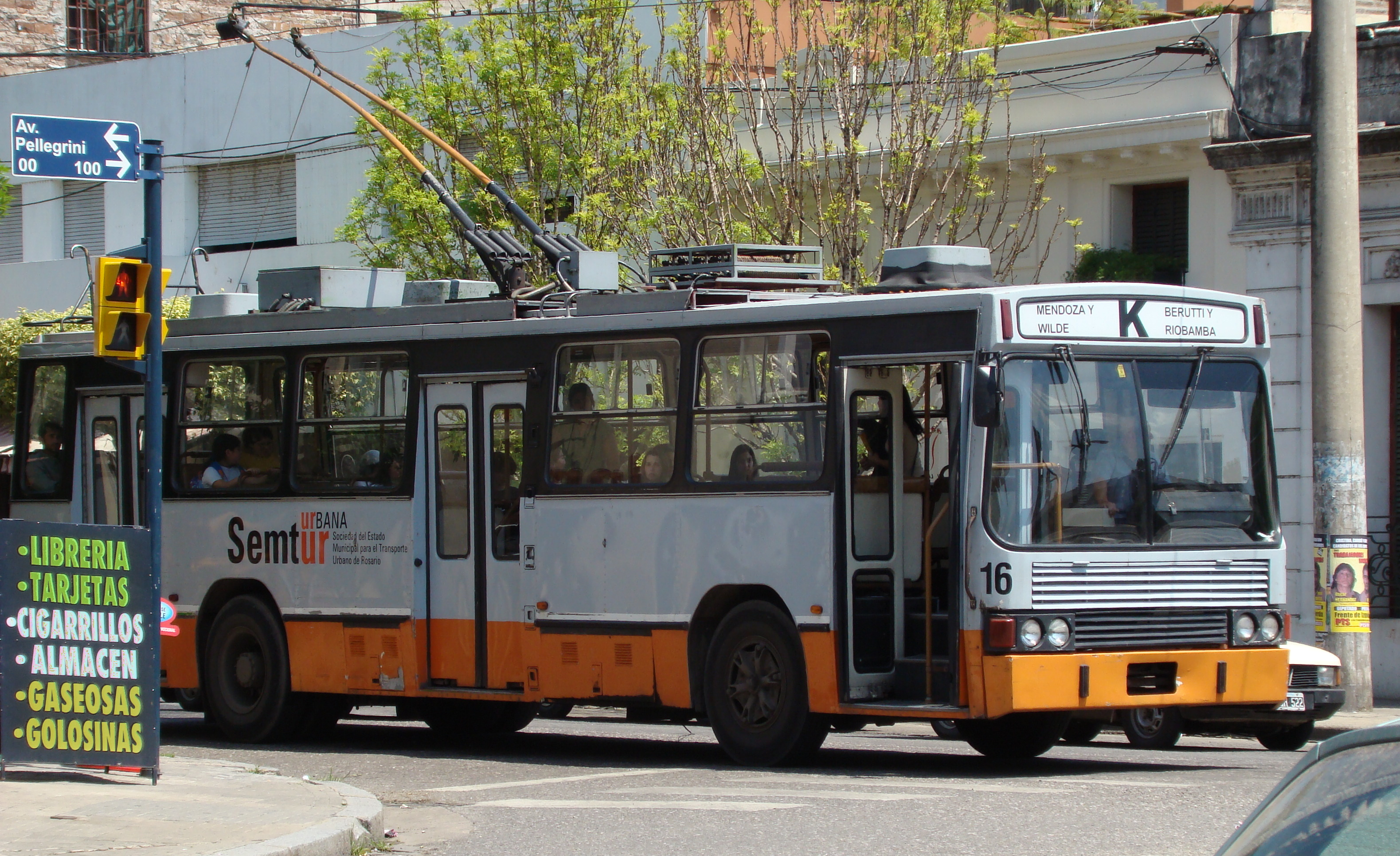
Rosario Marcopolo trolleybus No. 16 on line K in 2007

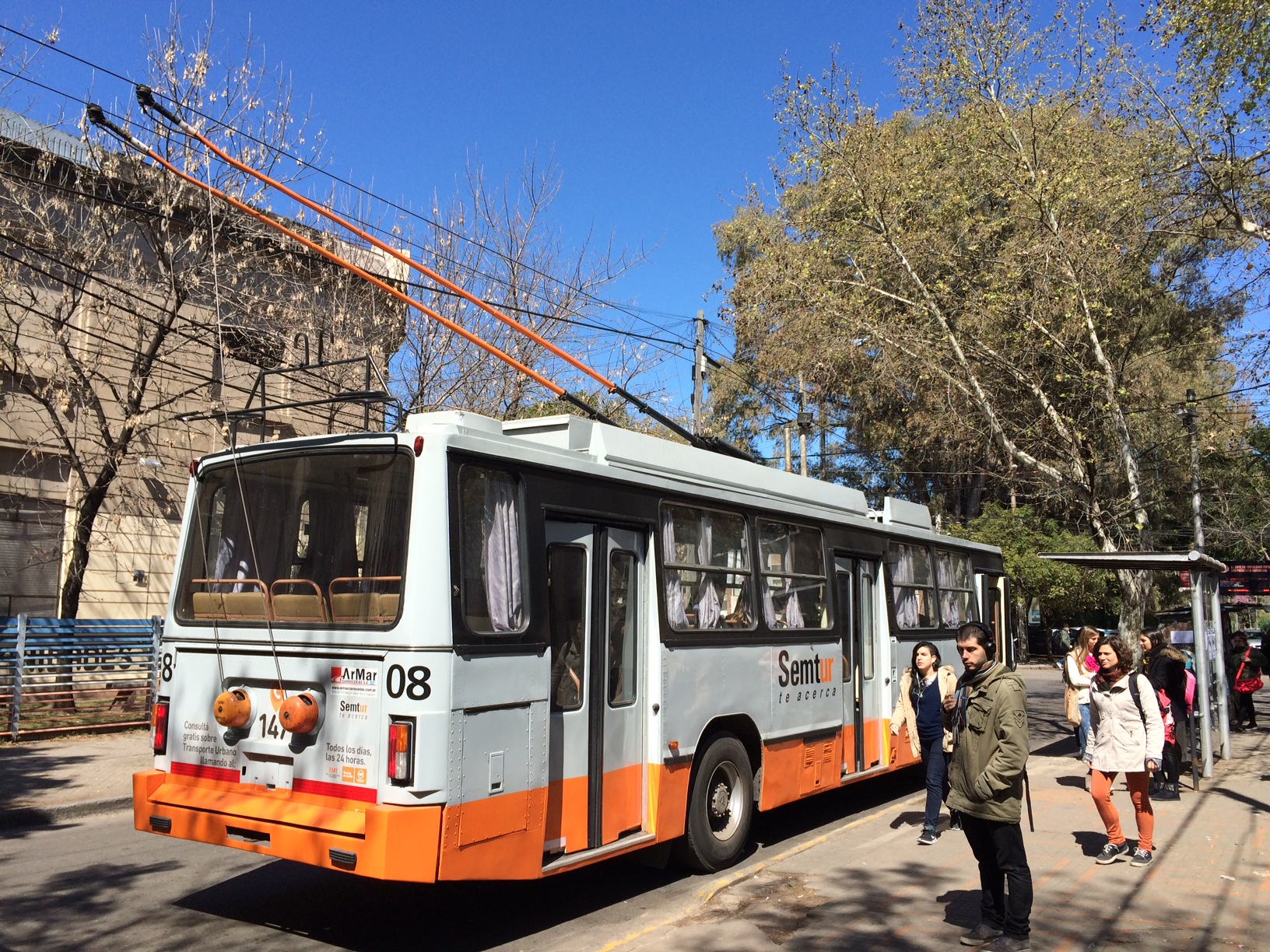
Rear view of Marcopolo trolleybus No. 08

As of November 2025, the fleet comprised around 26 trolleybuses:

- Nos. 01–20: Marcopolo/Volvo trolleybuses built in 1987 for a planned new trolleybus system in Belo Horizonte (Brazil) that never opened, which were placed into service in Rosario in 1994. All but one (No. 08) were partially rebuilt by ArMar Carrocerías SA in 2011–14. 4 remained in service as of November 2025 (Nos. 4, 7, 12, 14).
- Nos. 21–32: Trolza "Megapolis" 5265, built in 2016–17. Equipped with batteries powerful enough to allow part-time operation away from the overhead trolley wires in regular service. Entered service on 14 July 2017. 7 remained in service as of November 2025 (Nos. 23, 24, 26, 29–32).
- Nos. 33–38, 40–48: REBUS 380HP, built in 2019–25. Built locally from decommissioned Tatsa Puma (No. 33) and Metalpar Iguazu diesel buses.

The specifications of Rosario's Marcopolo trolleybuses are as follows:

Number and numbering	20 units (Nos. 01–20)
Year of manufacture / commissioning	1987 / 1994
Chassis and mechanicals	Volvo (Brazil)
Bodywork	Marcopolo Torino
Electrical equipment	Powertronics / Avibras
Length / width / height	12 / 2.54 / 3.48 m (from lowest point)
Passengers seated / total	39 / 110
Electrical control system	"Chopper" type electronics with fixed frequency
Traction motors / power output	Villares / 110 kW
Maximum speed	60 km/h
Maximum acceleration	1.3 m/s
Brakes / steering / suspension	Electric and pneumatic / hydraulic / pneumatic

The fleet also includes trolleybus 39, a 1961 Alfa Romeo/Fiat that was restored to operating condition in 2010–11, but it is used only on special occasions, not in regular service. Since 1998 it has been owned by the Asociación Rosarina Amigos del Riel. It carried Empresa Martín Fierro fleet number 11 at the time of its withdrawal from regular service, around 1983, but was restored to its original fleet number, 39.

== See also ==
- History of Rosario
- Rosario Tramway
- List of trolleybus systems
