= CATITA =

Argentine tram manufacturer

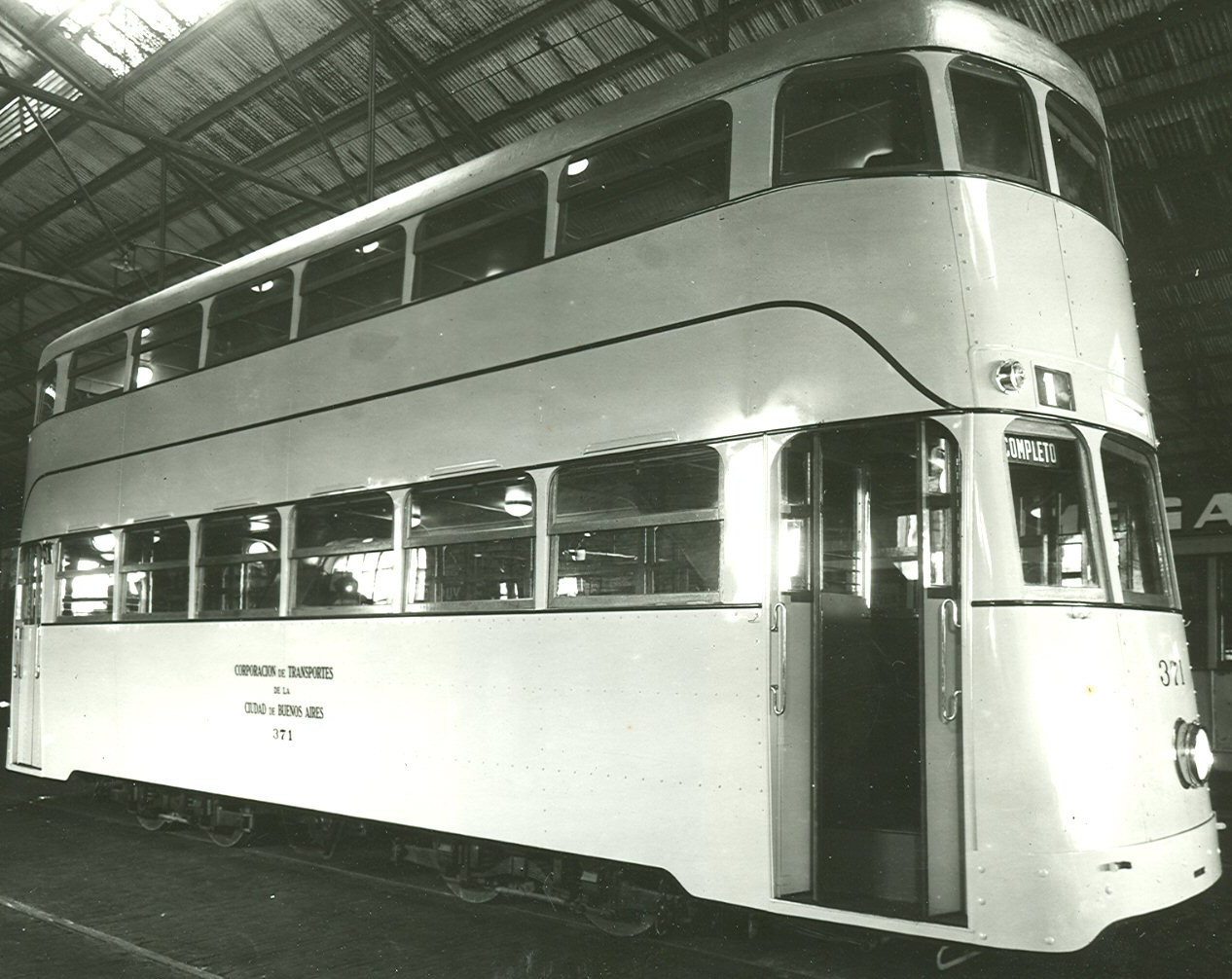
- A CATITA Imperial inside a workshop in Buenos Aires
- Industry: Transport
- Founded: May 1, 1932; 94 years ago
- Defunct: September 16, 1955; 70 years ago
- Headquarters: Argentina, Buenos Aires
- Products: Trams, Trains, Buses
- Number of employees: 2,000

Compañía de Talleres Industriales de Transportes y Afines (mostly known for its acronym CATITA) was an Argentine manufacturer of trams founded in 1932. At its peak during the golden years of the Buenos Aires tramways, the company employed around 2,000 people and was involved in diverse areas of manufacturing outside the production of rolling stock.

The company supplied trams and other vehicles to the city of Buenos Aires. However, the company also sold trams to the city of Asunción in Paraguay where they remained in service for many years.

== Catita Imperial ==
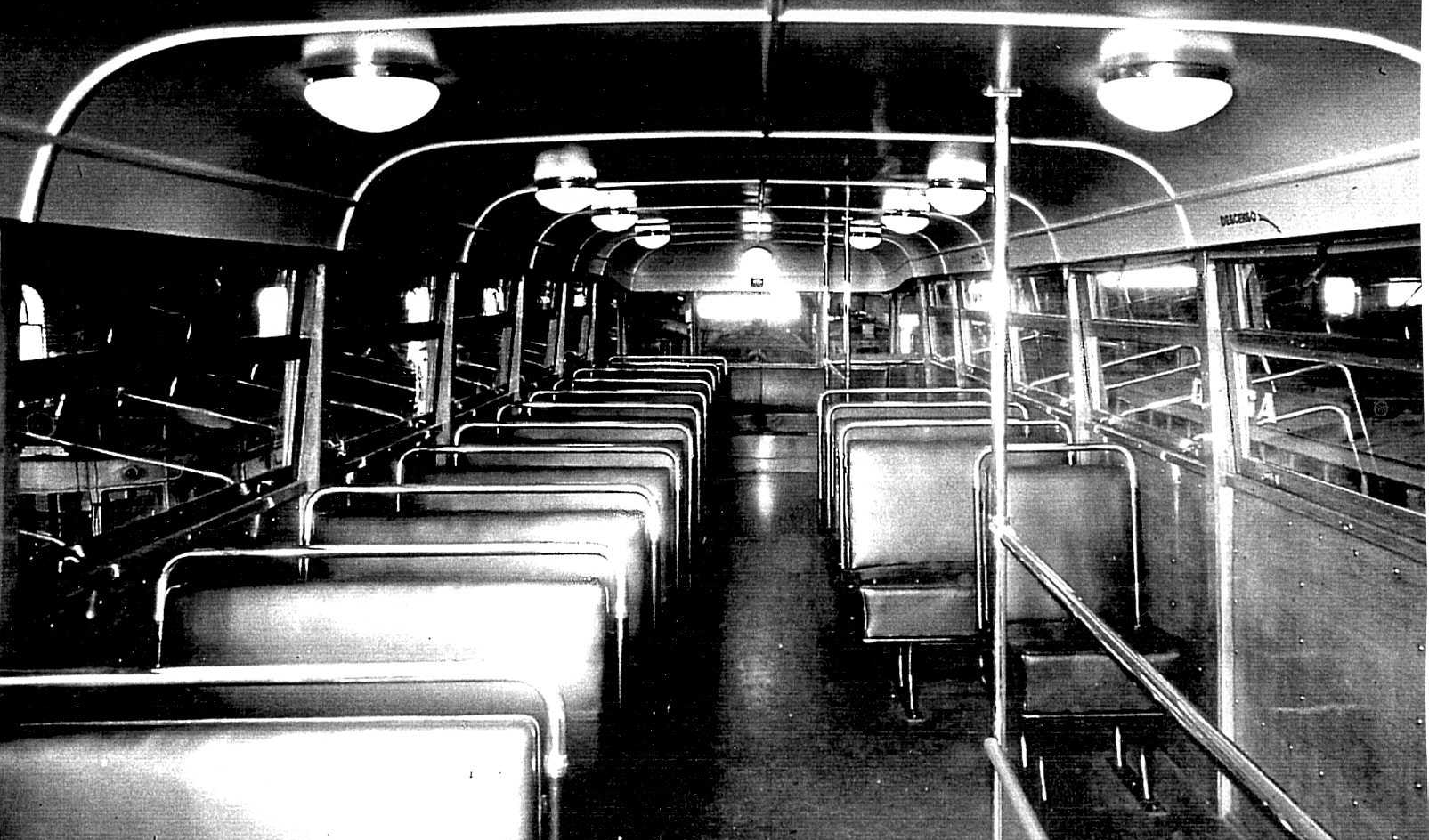
Upper deck of the "Imperial"

The Catita Imperial was a double decker tram based on the company's single deck Catita PCC. The tram was 11 metres long, 2.47 metres wide and 4.72 metres tall, weighing over 20 tonnes, and had capacity for 70 seated passengers. Rather than having a single staircase to the upper deck, the Imperial had two staircases, which also meant that there were only seats for 20 people upstairs.

The Tram was produced from 1942, however it was only in service for around 10 years since fierce competition from bus travel in Buenos Aires meant that there was less demand for high capacity trams of this kind. During its time in service, it was limited to lines that ran near the centre of the city since its great height meant that it was unsuitable for safe clearance under certain bridges, tunnels and underpasses.

== See also ==
- Trams in Buenos Aires
- Fabricaciones Militares
- Rail transport in Argentina
