= Córdoba Metro =

Proposed metro rail system for Córdoba, Argentina

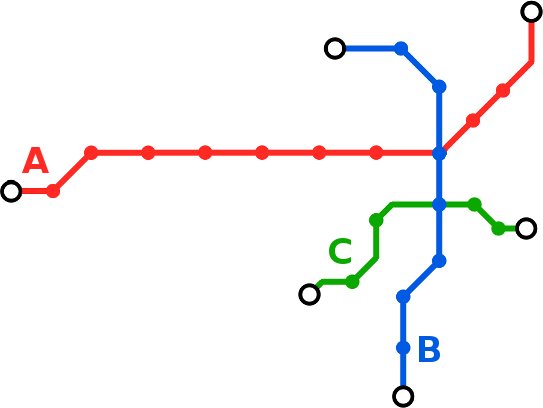
- Map of the current proposal for the system.

Overview
- Owner: Consorcio Metro Córdoba
- Locale: Córdoba, Argentina
- Transit type: Rapid transit
- Number of lines: 3 (proposed)
- Number of stations: 26 (proposed)

Technical
- System length: 32.9 km (20.4 mi) (proposed)
- Track gauge: 1,000 mm (3 ft 3 3/8 in) (metre gauge)

The Córdoba Metro was a project that was supposed to, according to its proponents, serve the city of Córdoba, the second-largest city in Argentina. The metro system would have become the second metro system in Argentina, after the Buenos Aires Underground. The project was dropped after several issues.

== Background ==
On December 10, 2007, the Secretary of Transport and Traffic of the Argentine Municipality announced an initiative of the Iecsa/Gela companies to build an underground system in the City of Córdoba. The announcement was made after a meeting with the Argentine Secretary of Transport, Ricardo Jaime and, on December 14, the municipality commenced Technical and Financial Feasibility studies.

=== First proposal ===
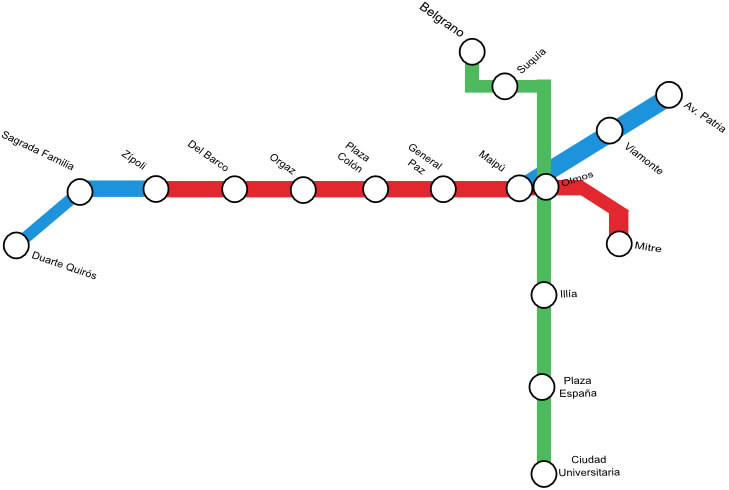
The first proposed routes

Finally on April 10, 2008, President Cristina Kirchner in a meeting with the mayor of the city of Córdoba, Daniel Giacomino confirmed the construction of the metro system. In the meeting, the Argentine president also announced granting the adjudication of the high-speed rail to the French engineering giant, Alstom. This original proposal was for a two line metro network comprising 15.8 kilometers (9.8 mi) of route.

Depending on which vehicles would be selected and other factors, the total planned cost of the system is of nearly US$1.1 billion. The preliminary design of the original project foresaw two principal lines. The first line would cross the city from west to south, over Colón and Duarte Quirós Avenues, up to Perón Boulevard, where it would reach the vicinity of the Mitre Railroad, near the bus terminal. The second line would run from north to south near the Ciudad Universitaria area, and under the Suquía river, continuing northwards to the Belgrano railway, near the Alta Córdoba train station. Plans were initially for the construction of 17 stations, 11 on the west-south line, and six in the south–north line.

However, an updated plan was announced in November 2010, with 29 stations on a 18.5 kilometers (11.5 mi) network built by China Railway International, costing US$1.8 billion.

=== Second proposal ===
The project was redesigned again in 2012. The redesigned project proposes a three-line metro network consisting of 32.9 kilometers (20.4 mi) of route and 26 stations to be built by China Railway International and financed by a US$1.8 billion loan from China. Line A would run 10.7 kilometers (6.6 mi) from Colón Avenue in the west to Bajada de Piedra and serve 11 stations. An interchange would be provided at Maipú with the proposed 6.5-kilometer (4.0 mi) north-south Line B, which would run from Alta Córdoba near the Belgrano Railway station to Rontonda las Flores, and would serve 8 stations. Shortest of the three routes, Line C would run 5.6 kilometers (3.5 mi) east-west from Fuerza Aérea Avenue to Sabattini Avenue, paralleling Line A but further south, serving 7 stations.

The new redesigned project was approved by the municipality in 2012, however no date for the commencement of the works was given by the national government. In November 2014, a member of the Radical Civic Union attempted to restart the project to get it back on track, however it was met with lukewarm responses from the national government.

== Construction features ==
Tunnel boring machines used in the construction will, according to experts of the Iecsa company, avoid surface traffic interruption when the tunnels from the start of the project are covered in 40 centimeters (16 in) thick prefabricated assembled units of concrete. The trains will have safety systems along the entire metro network.
