= BAP =

BAP or bap may refer to:

== Food ==
- Bap (bread), a bread roll
- Bap (rice dish), of Korea

== People ==
- Bap Kennedy (1962–2016), Northern Irish singer-songwriter
- Bronze Age Pervert, Romanian-American far-right writer

== Music ==
- BAP (German band), a Colognian rock group (formed 1976)
- BAP (Basque band), a hardcore punk group (1984–1996)
- B.A.P (South Korean band) (2012–2019)
- Build a Problem, 2021 indie album by Dodie

== Organizations ==
=== Political parties ===
- Balochistan Awami Party, Pakistan
- Bharat Adivasi Party, India
- Bright Armenia, Armenia

=== Rail companies ===
- Buenos Aires al Pacífico, Argentina (1993–2000)
- Buenos Aires and Pacific Railway (BA&P), Argentina (1886–1948)
- Butte, Anaconda and Pacific Railway, Montana, US (founded 1891)

=== Other organizations ===
- Basketball Association of the Philippines, defunct sports body (1938–2007)
- Beta Alpha Psi, an international honor society
- Bankruptcy Appellate Panel, form of American judicial body

== Places ==
- Bap, Rajasthan, a panchayat village in Jodhpur District, Rajasthan, India
  - Bap tehsil, its enclosing township

== Science and technology ==
- 6-Benzylaminopurine, a plant hormone
- Benzo[a]pyrene, a polycyclic aromatic hydrocarbon
- Backhaul Adaptation Protocol, a network protocol used in 5G
- Best Aquaculture Practices (BAP)
- Biodiversity action plan
- Blood agar plate
- Broader autism phenotype

== Other uses ==
- BAP System, a point system for chess
- Bali Action Plan
- Black American princess
- Browning Automatic Pistol, an alternative name for the Browning Hi-Power
- BAP (Buque Armada Peruana), the prefix for ships of the Peruvian Navy

== See also ==
- Baps (disambiguation)
