= Jacques Witjens =

Dutch artist (1881–1956)

Adrianus Hendrikus "Jacques" Witjens
- Born: April 11, 1881; The Hague, Netherlands
- Died: December 7, 1956 (aged 75); Buenos Aires, Argentina
- Known for: Paintings

Adrianus Hendrikus "Arie" “Jacques” Witjens (11 April 1881 – 7 December 1956) was a Dutch painter known for his landscapes, cityscapes and figures of his native Netherlands and Argentina, where he lived after 1920.

== Early life and education ==
Witjens was born in The Hague in 1881 and began to study painting aged 14. He studied at the Royal Academy of Art, The Hague, and privately with August Allebé who was professor and director of the Rijksakademie van beeldende kunsten (State Academy of Fine Arts).

In 1901 he opened his studio located near Mauritshuis and was part of the second generation of the Hague School.

In 1912 he won the 1st prize at the Bignall Competition. During the 1910s he lived in Utrecht, Haarlem, Voorburg, and Nieuwkoop. In 1918 he exhibited collectively in The Hague.

In 1920 he married Herta Maria Stephan and travelled to Argentina on their honeymoon. The two decided to settle in Buenos Aires, in Tigre for about 20 years and later in Belgrano. "Argentina was paradise to us so we stayed", he remarked. The couple had two sons, Rolando and Hermen.

== Career ==
Witjens was commonly addressed as "Arie" in the Netherlands and later added “Jacques” to his name to project a more artistic image. He would sometimes use his wife's surname together with his own to sign some of his paintings. He became a successful painter and exhibited regularly in prestigious salons of Argentina:

- 1925 Círculo Belga, Buenos Aires, collective exhibition.
- 1928 Galeria Neuman, Buenos Aires.
- 1931 Galería Clayton, Buenos Aires.
- 1932 to 1936, 1944, 1945, 1947 to 1949 Galería Nordiska
- 1940 Galería Viau, Buenos Aires.
- 1941 to 1944 Galería Renom, Rosario.
- 1949 Mar de Plata and Tandill rooms of San Fernando, Buenos Aires.
- 1958 Ateneo Esteban Echeverría of San Fernando, a retrospective.
- 1962 Netherlands Embassy, Buenos Aires.
- 1964 Dámaso Arce Museum, Buenos Aires.
- 1988 and 1989 Colección Alvear de Zurbarán.
- Several between 1985 and 2019 Zurbarán Gallery, Buenos Aires.

In 1947 Witjens won the award for the best landscape of the Delta in the Salón de San Fernando, Buenos Aires. In 1948 he was appointed the best foreign painter at the Museo Nacional de Bellas Artes, in Buenos Aires.

He died in Buenos Aires in 1956.

== Legacy ==
Witjens painted either plein-air or in his studio in Avenida Sarmiento, while listening to Mozart, Haydn and Beethoven. He produced oils, pastels and watercolors.

He was influenced by Jacob Maris, Hendrik Wessenbruch, Max Liebermann and Hans Von Bartels.

The paintings from his European period have abundance of greens, blues and browns, thick impasto. His Argentinian ones introduce a wider palette and much softer brushstrokes.

His style remained true to his roots, giving his delicate views of Buenos Aires, Tigre, Tandil, Balcarce and Córdoba a calm and airy feel. The water of the Dutch canals often flows through European towns and rural landscapes in his Argentinian creations.

Witjens also did illustrations for the books of poet Mario Luis Descotte. He befriended and exhibited with other artists, such as British Stephen Robert Koekkoek, and Argentinians José Félix Rolla, Fernando Fader, Miguel Burgoa Videla, Alberto M. Rossi, and Luis Aquino.

His works are part of collections in Europe and America, such as those of the Museum de Lakenhal in Leiden, Museum Helmond in Helmond, the Ushuaia Maritime Museum, the Museo de Arte Tigre, Amalia Lacroze de Fortabat Art Collection, Buenos Aires Stock Exchange, and Fundación Tres Pinos in Buenos Aires.

== Sources ==
- Jacques Witjens, VIII Exporisión Retrospectiva, catalogue, Zurbarán and ABN AMRO Bank, Buenos Aires, 1999.
- Carlos María Pinasco: "Jacques Witjens: El holandés sedentario", catalogue of the 10th retrospective. Buenos Aires, 2003.
- Arte de la Argentina
- Zurbarán Gallery
- Library of Congress
- Artnet
- Amalia Lacroze de Fortabat Foundation
- Worldcat
- RDK
- Art index
- NL Bio
- Grupo La Provincia newspaper 24 January 2021
- La Vereda magazine 25 January 2021
- Zomerlandschap met schuit by Arie Witjens, Museum De Lakenhal
