= AMALITA Collection =

Art Museum in Buenos Aires, Argentina

Coordinates: 34°35′58″S 58°21′54″W

- Colección de Arte Amalia Lacroze de Fortabat
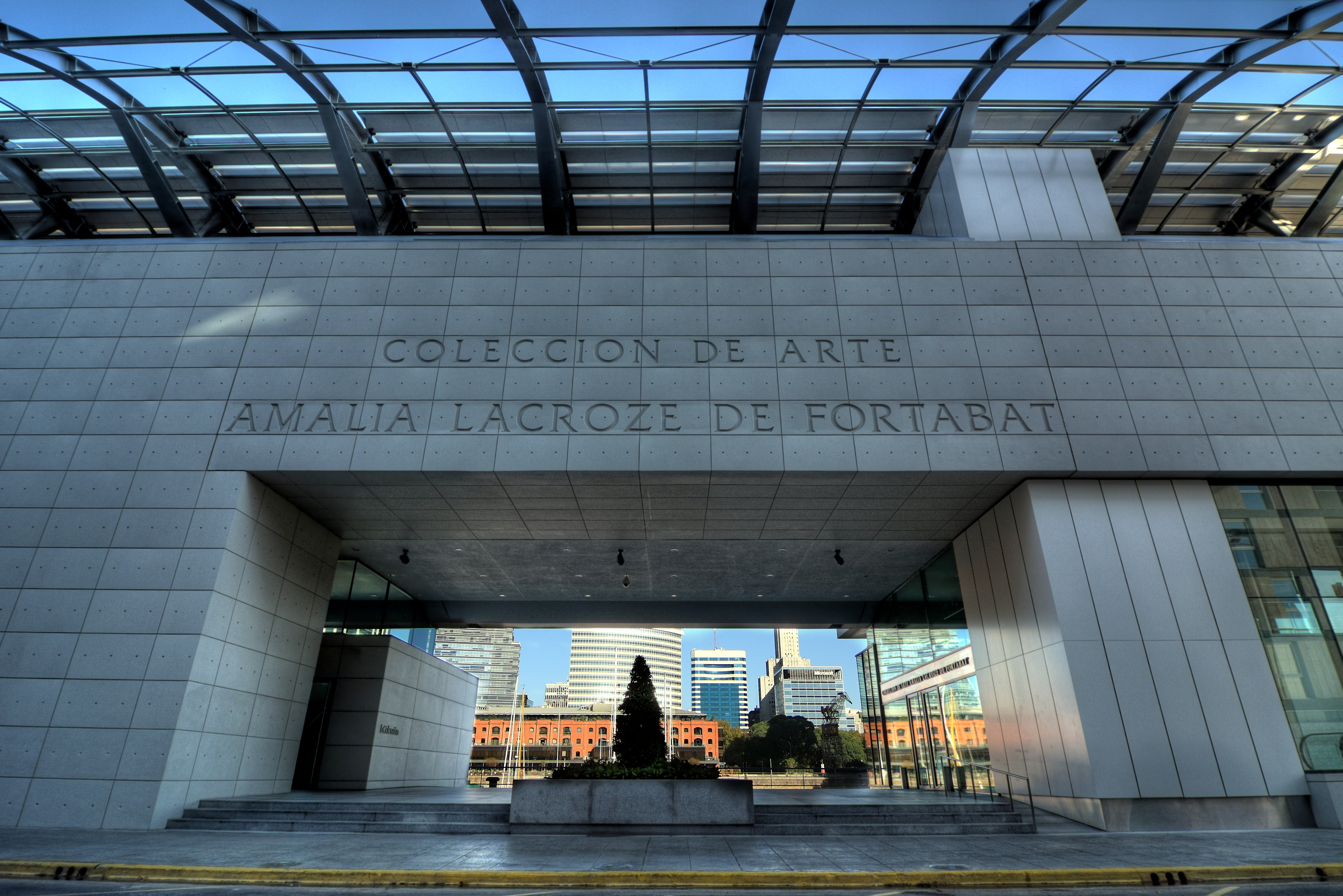
- The museum in 2009
- Established: 2008
- Location: Olga Cossettini 141, Buenos Aires, Argentina
- Type: Art museum
- Founder: María Amalia Lacroze de Fortabat
- Director: Germán Barraza
- Architect: Rafael Viñoly
- Website: coleccionamalita.org.ar/en

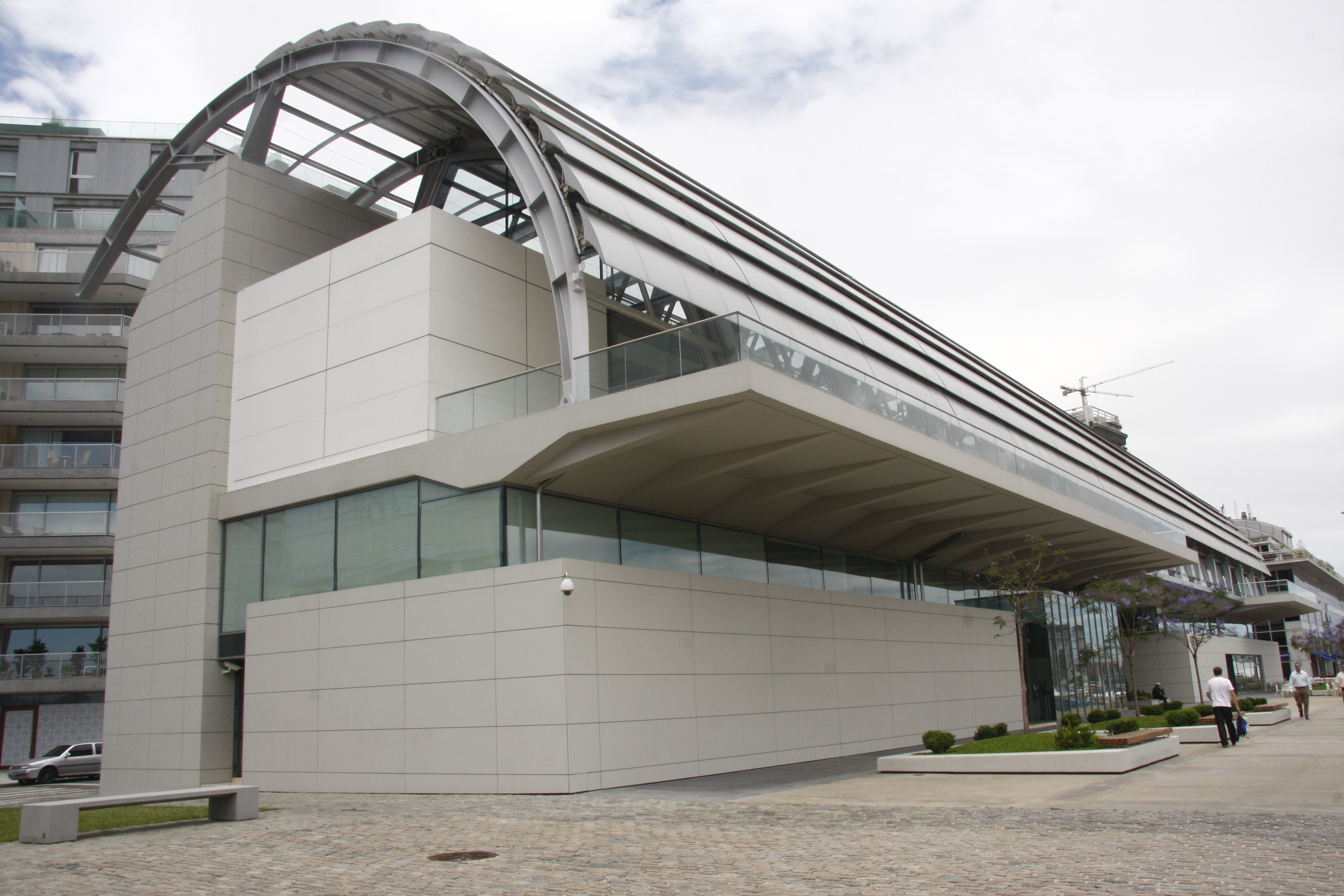
View of the museum from the side

The AMALITA Collection (Spanish: Colección AMALITA) officially the Amalia Lacroze de Fortabat Art Collection is an art museum in Buenos Aires, Argentina.

== Overview ==
The museum was initiated by María Amalia Lacroze de Fortabat, the longtime chairperson and chief stockholder of Loma Negra, the largest cement manufacturer in Argentina. She set aside a significant portion of her extensive art collection for the purpose, and her foundation contracted internationally acclaimed, Uruguayan born architect Rafael Viñoly for its design.

The building, a two-story modernist concrete, steel and glass structure, began construction in 2002 and provides over 6,000 square metres (65,000 sq ft) of indoor space. Built overlooking the northernmost dock in the Puerto Madero district, among its highlights include a roof with a system of mobile aluminum awnings that open and close with the sun's position. Mrs. Fortabat specifically requested this last design feature, remarking that "I've always wanted to look at pictures and the stars at the same time."

The museum was inaugurated on October 22, 2008, and includes two exhibition halls, a library, an auditorium, offices and a cafe-restaurant overlooking the renovated Puerto Madero docklands. At the time of the opening, two exhibition halls housed a collection of 230 works and were divided into seven galleries:

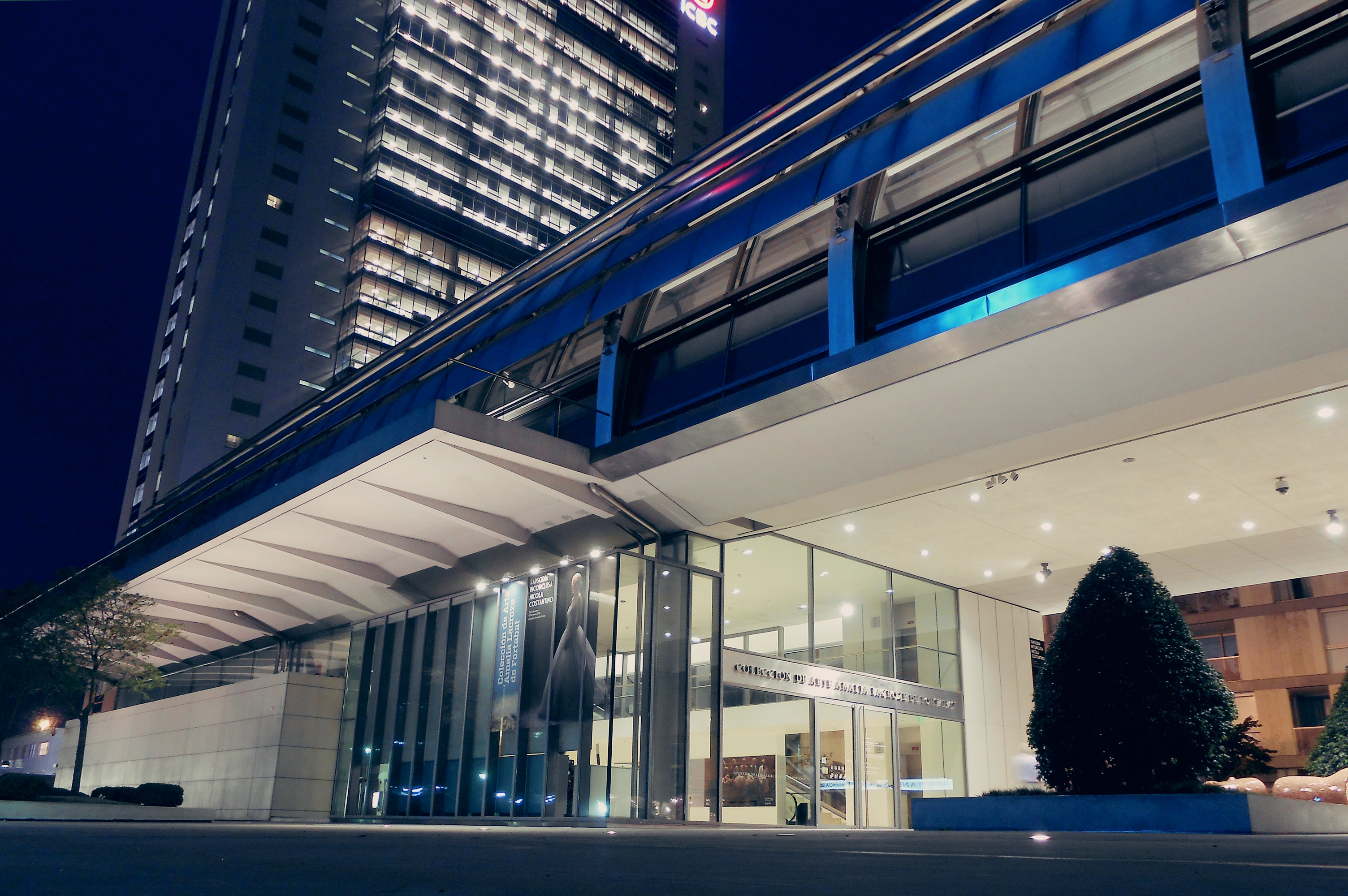
The museum at night

- The Family Gallery: featuring portraits of the Fortabat family.
- Landscapes, the City and Tradition: consisting mostly of 19th century Argentine landscape, naturalist and naïf art by Fernando Fader, Martín Malharro and Prilidiano Pueyrredón and Benito Quinquela Martín, among others.
- International Art: including works by Pieter Brueghel II, Marc Chagall, Salvador Dalí, Gustav Klimt, Auguste Rodin, Roberto Matta, Jacques Witjens and, among others, Andy Warhol, who created one of his iconic portraits for the patroness. This section also includes one of the few oil paintings from J. M. W. Turner remaining in private hands, undoubtlessly the highlight of the collection Juliet and her Nurse
- Modern Art: Displaying mainly 20th century Argentine works, such as those by Juan Del Prete, Raquel Forner, Emilio Pettoruti, Lino Enea Spilimbergo, Xul Solar and Juan Carlos Castagnino.
- Figurations, Halls I and II: set aside for Figurative art works, such as those by Roberto Aizenberg, Antonio Seguí and Clorindo Testa.
- Antonio Berni Gallery: devoted to the noted Argentine painter and muralist.

== Gallery ==
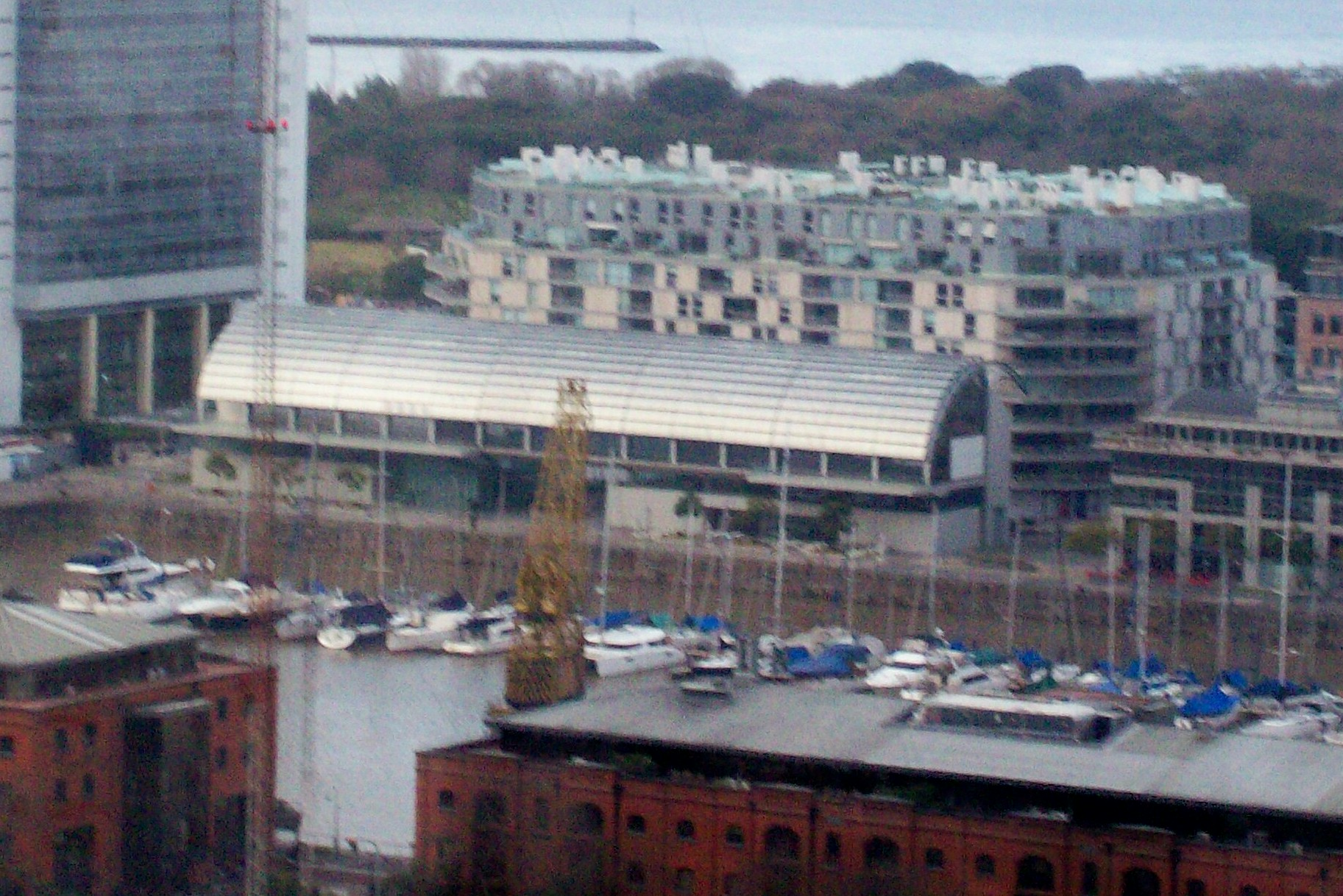

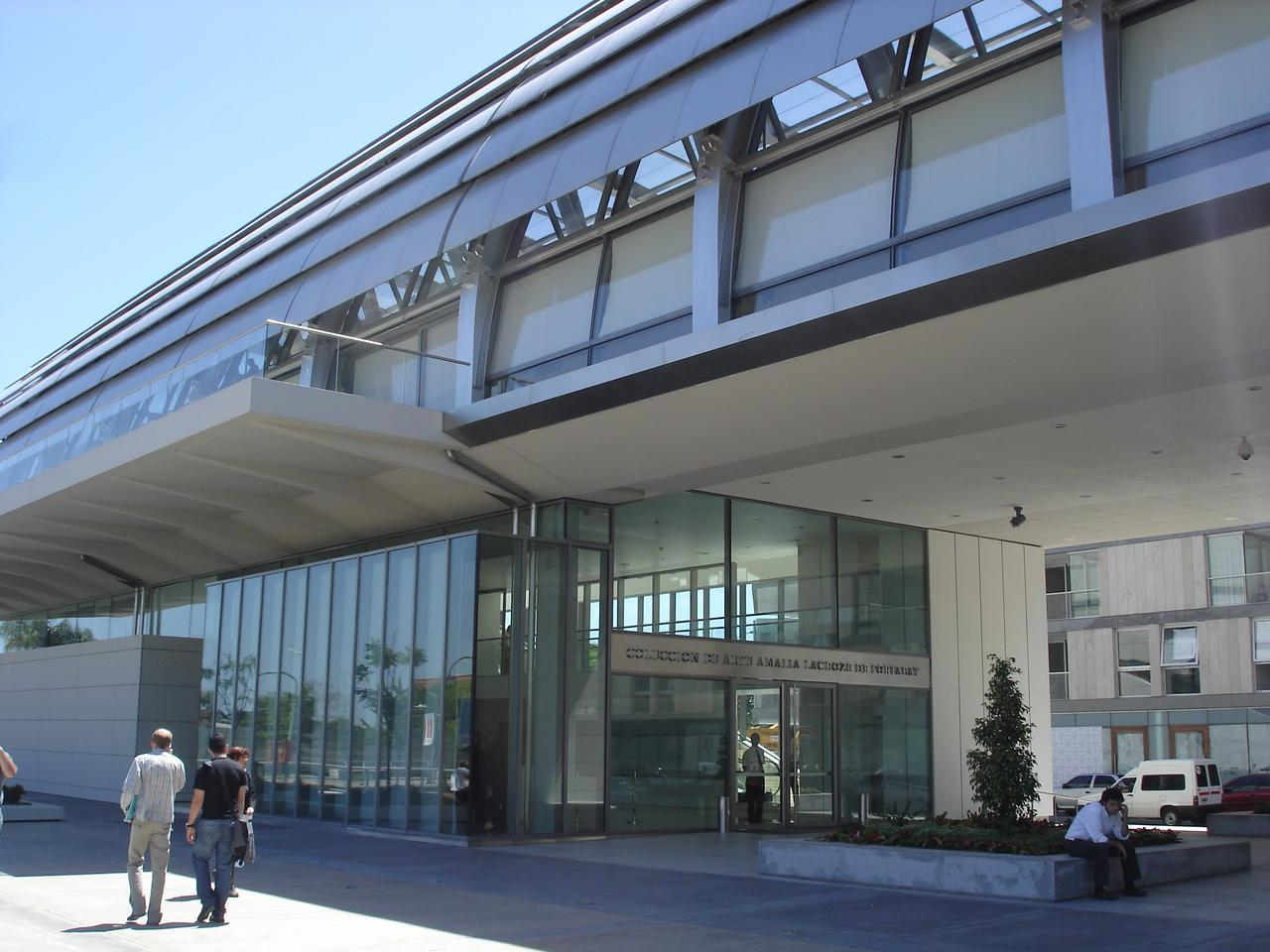

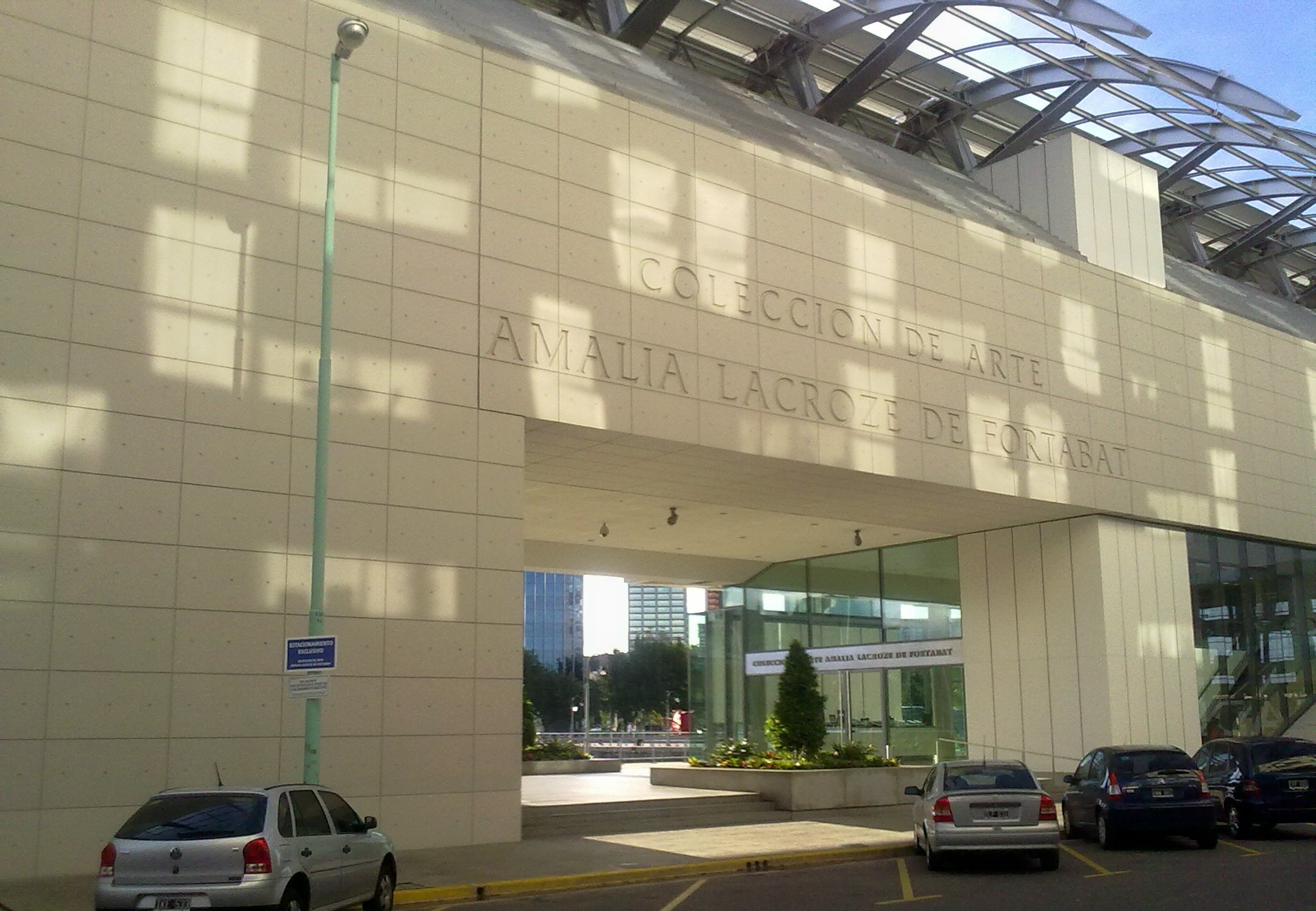

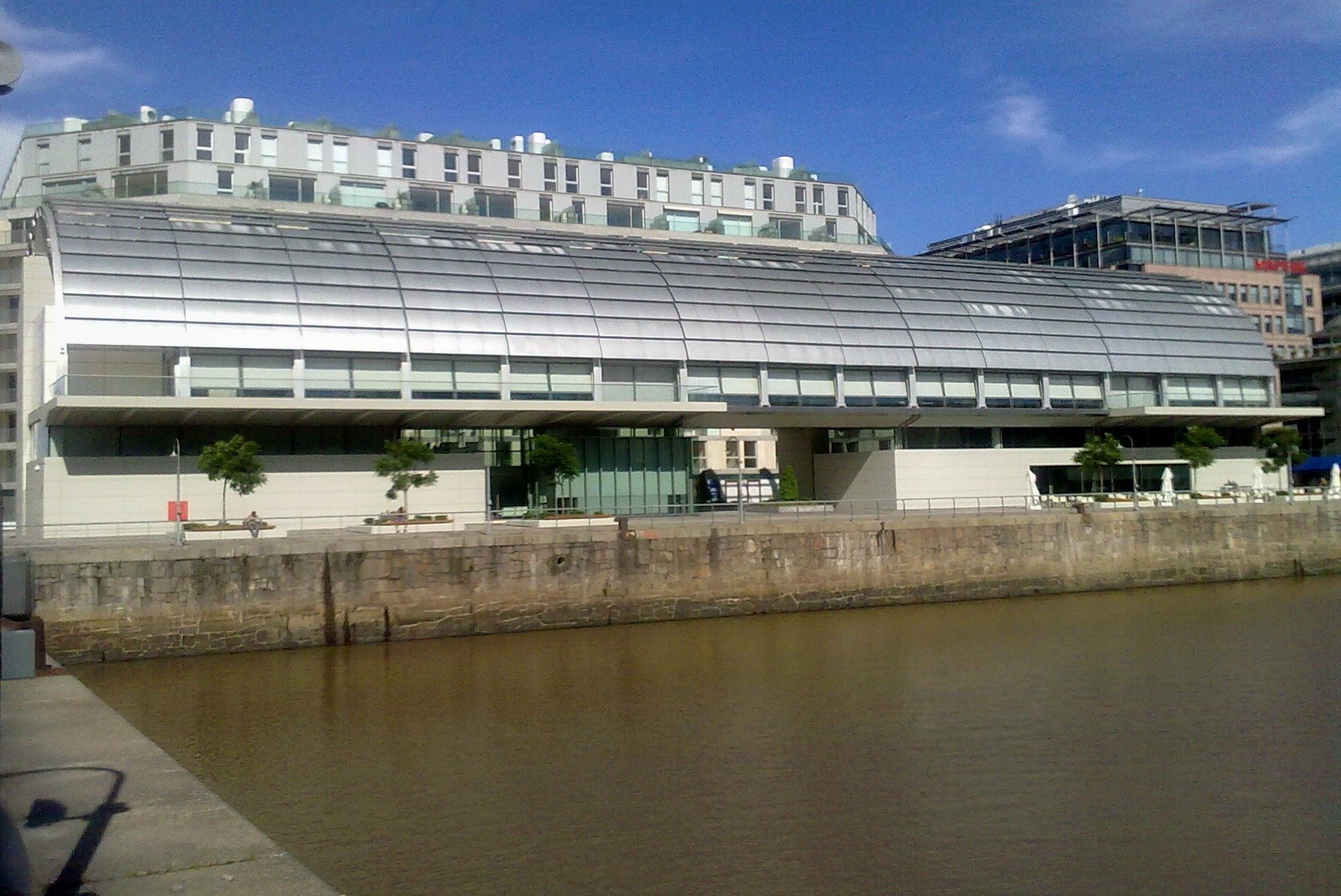

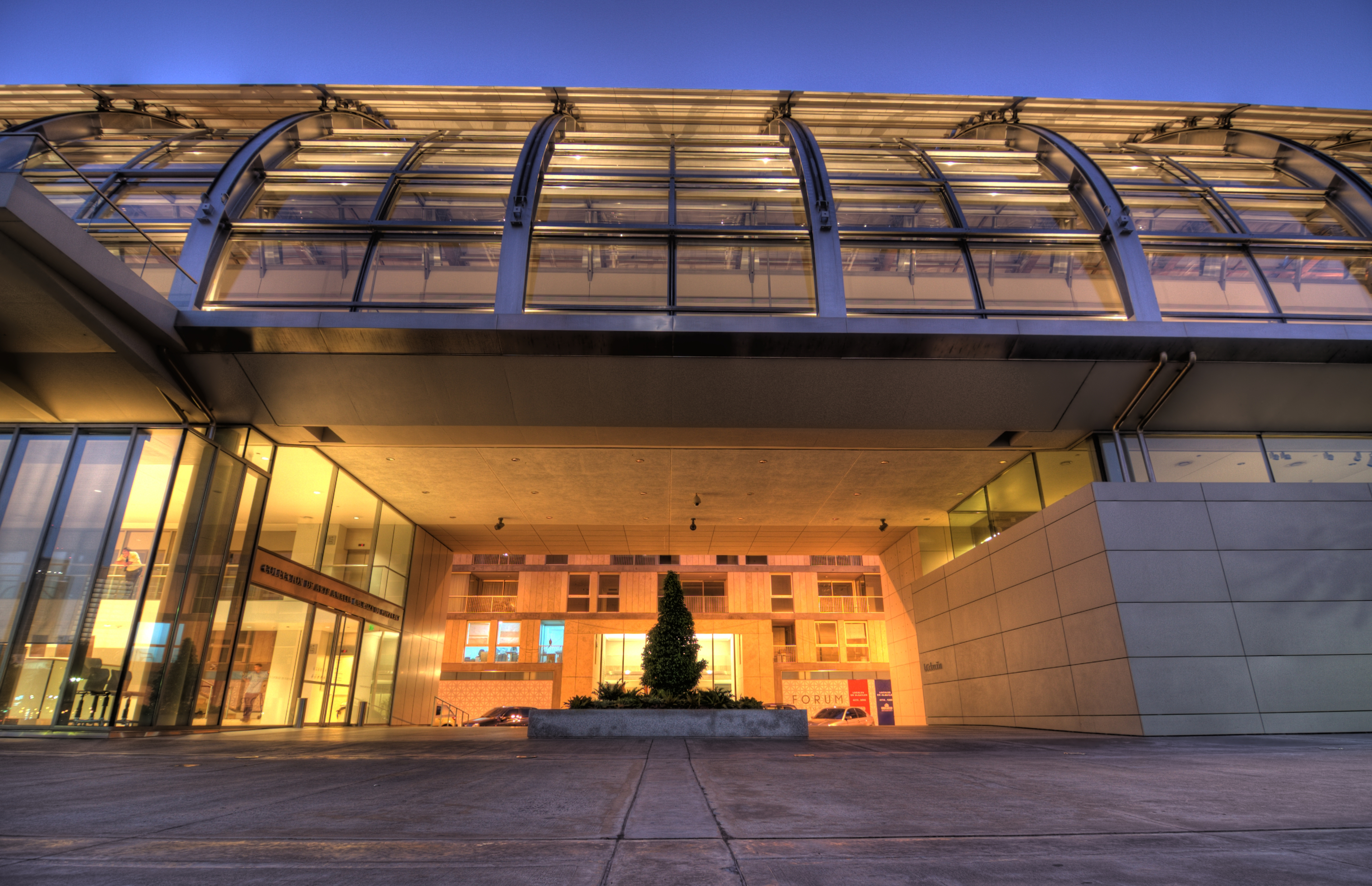

== See also ==
- Juliet and her Nurse – painting by J. M. W. Turner in the collection
