= Railway privatisation in Argentina =

Privatisation of Argentine railways

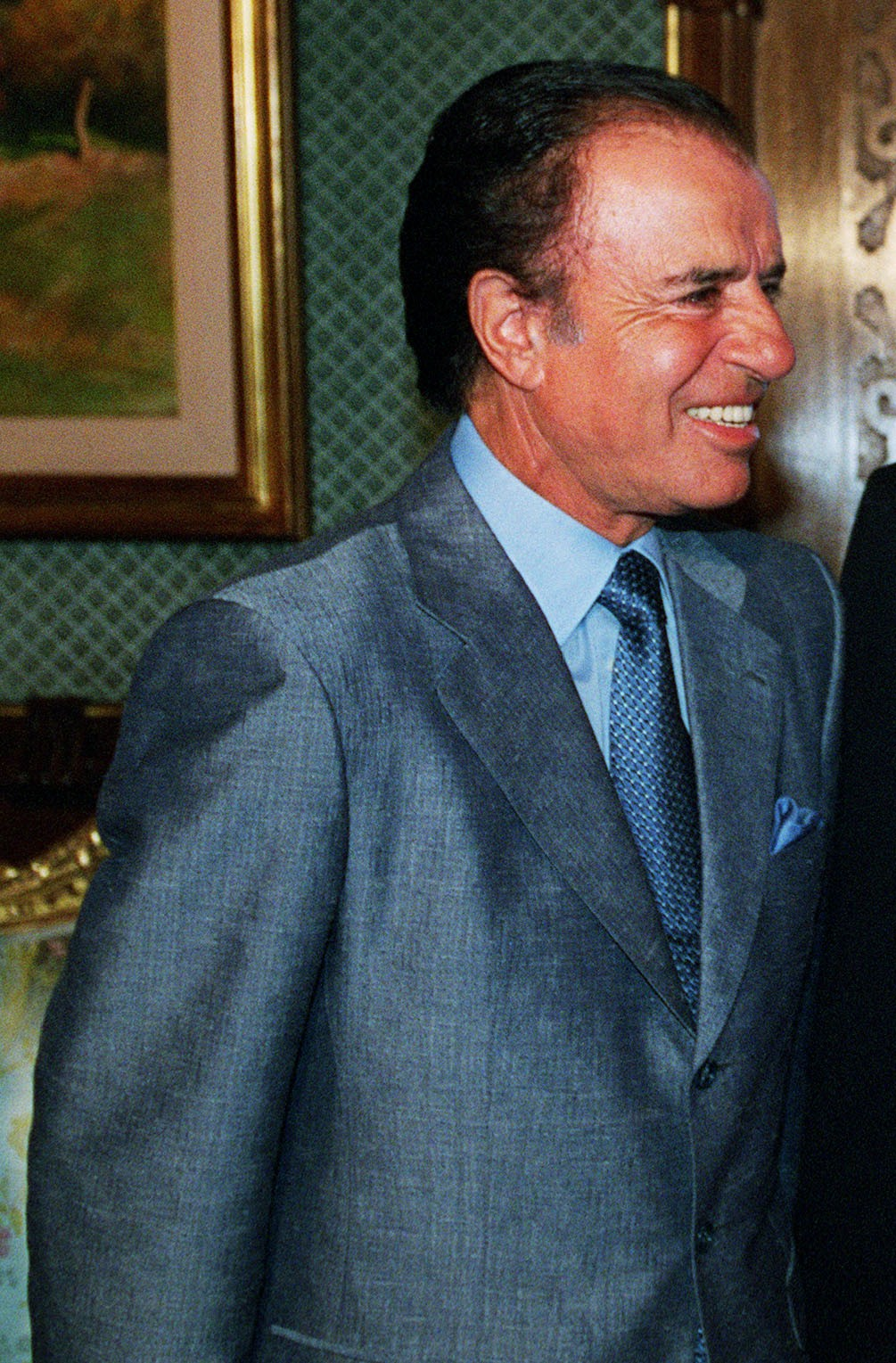
- Carlos Menem's administration carried out the privatisation process
- Duration: 1989–1999
- Location: Argentina
- Type: Privatisation
- Theme: Concessions granted to private companies to operate the Argentine rail transport network
- Motive: Ferrocarriles Argentinos deficit Reform of the state
- Participants: Government of Argentina; Private consortiums

Railway privatisation in Argentina was a process which began in 1989 under the presidency of Carlos Menem, following a series of neoliberal economic reforms. This primarily consisted of breaking up the state-owned railway company Ferrocarriles Argentinos (FA) and allowing the former lines to be operated by private companies instead of the state.

This policy was met with widespread criticism and proved catastrophic for the Argentine railways whose service worsened significantly in the years that followed, with entire lines closing and infrastructure deteriorating beyond repair. Privatisation was ultimately reversed in 2015 with the creation of Nuevos Ferrocarriles Argentinos.

== Background ==
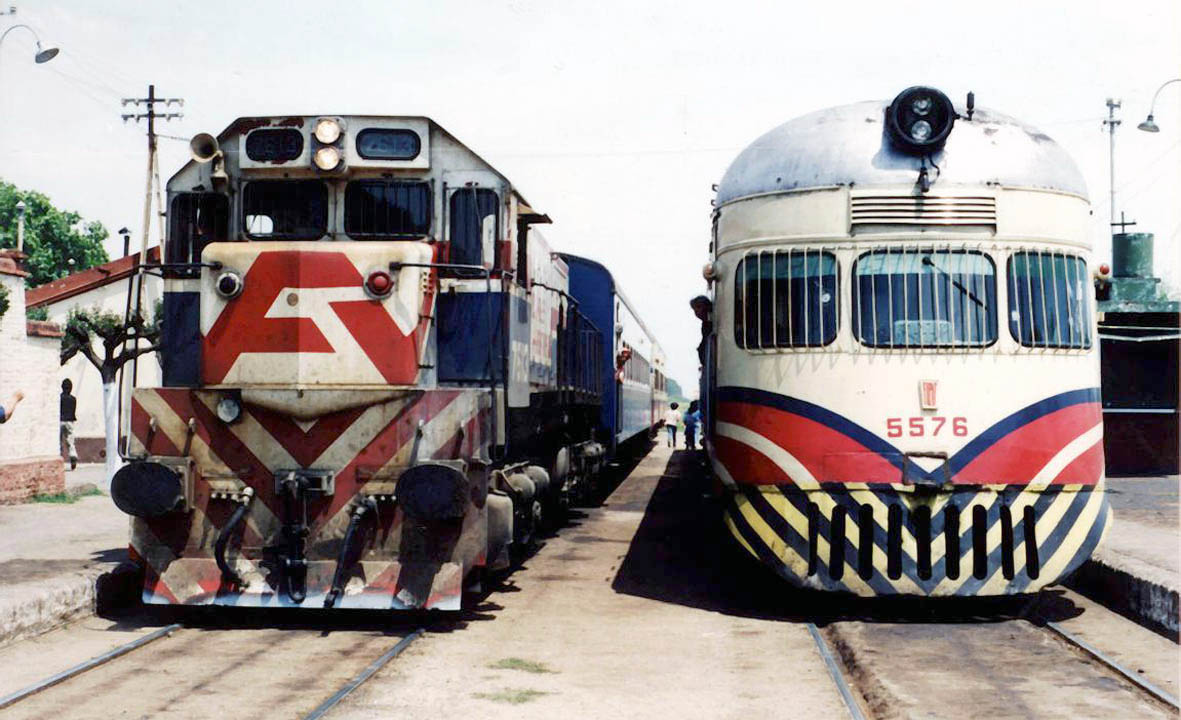
Sarmiento Railway rolling stock during the FA era

Since railway nationalisation in 1948, during the presidency of Juan Perón, the network had been operated by the state-owned company Ferrocarriles Argentinos (FA) which comprised the six relatively independent divisions, Sarmiento, Mitre, Urquiza, San Martín, Belgrano and Roca.

By the time President Carlos Menem's administration took over in 1989, FA had a serious economic deficit, with no investment projected and a high amount of social charges owed to the state. The amount of freight services had considerably decreased between 1970 and 1990, going from 13,500 million tons to 7,500 million twenty years later, almost a 45% decrease. The infrastructure and rolling stock were seriously deteriorated, with the exception of the central network. The majority of the locomotives and coaches had become obsolete, therefore maintenance costs also increased. The aim was to reduce FA's deficit previous to a major restructuring of the company.

With the railway network's chronic deficit having risen to US$355 million per year, the National Congress adopted Law 23,696 (named Ley de Reforma del Estado) which began the privatisation process in 1989.

The law allowed president Menem to declare a state of emergency over any state-owned company with the objective to proceed to a privatisation or closure of that company. In November 1989, Menem pronounced his famous threat to any rail workers contemplating strike action: "Ramal que para, ramal que cierra" ("A line that goes on strike is a line that will be closed").

== Freight services ==
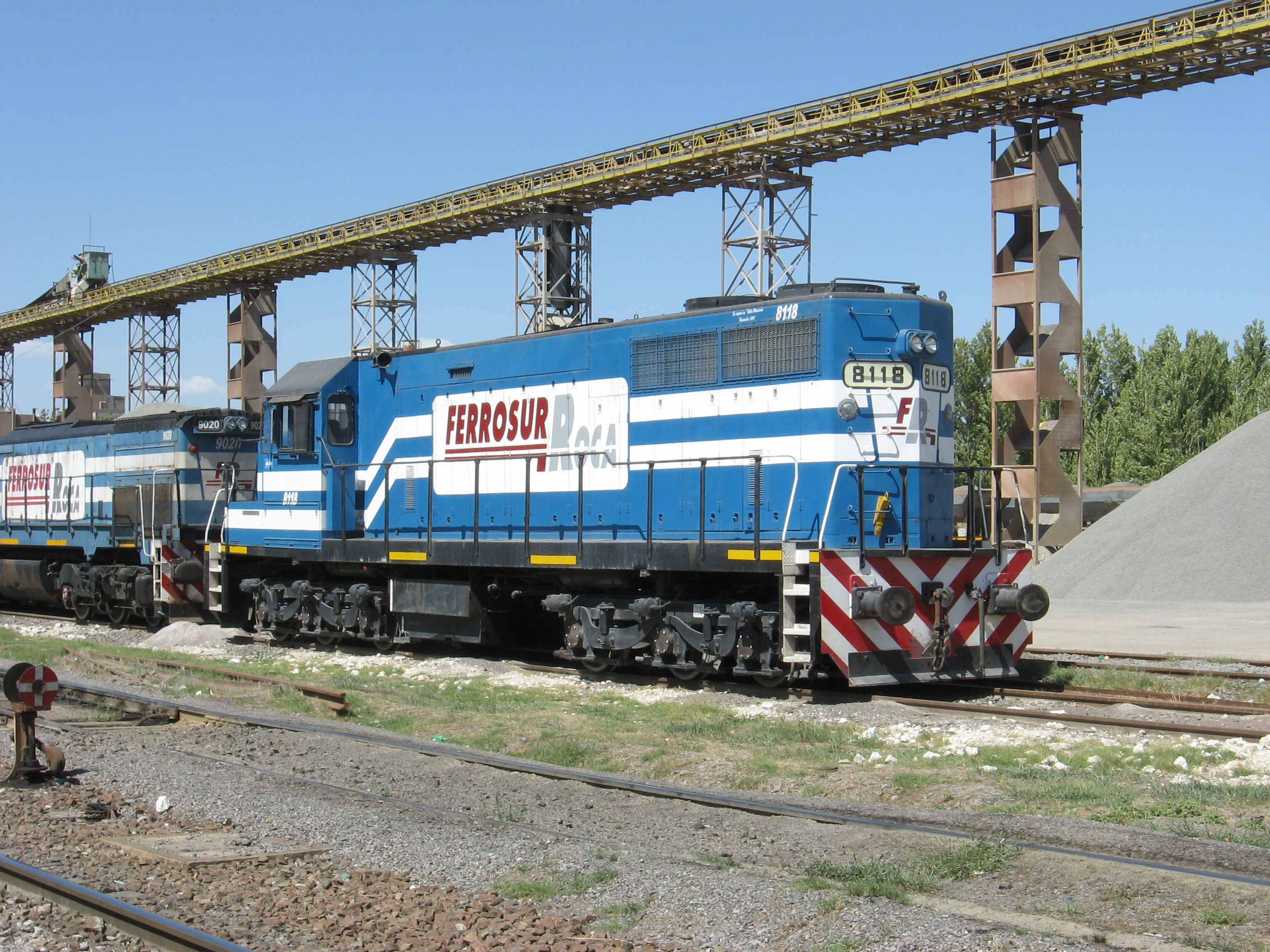
Ferrosur Roca was granted the Roca Railway concession

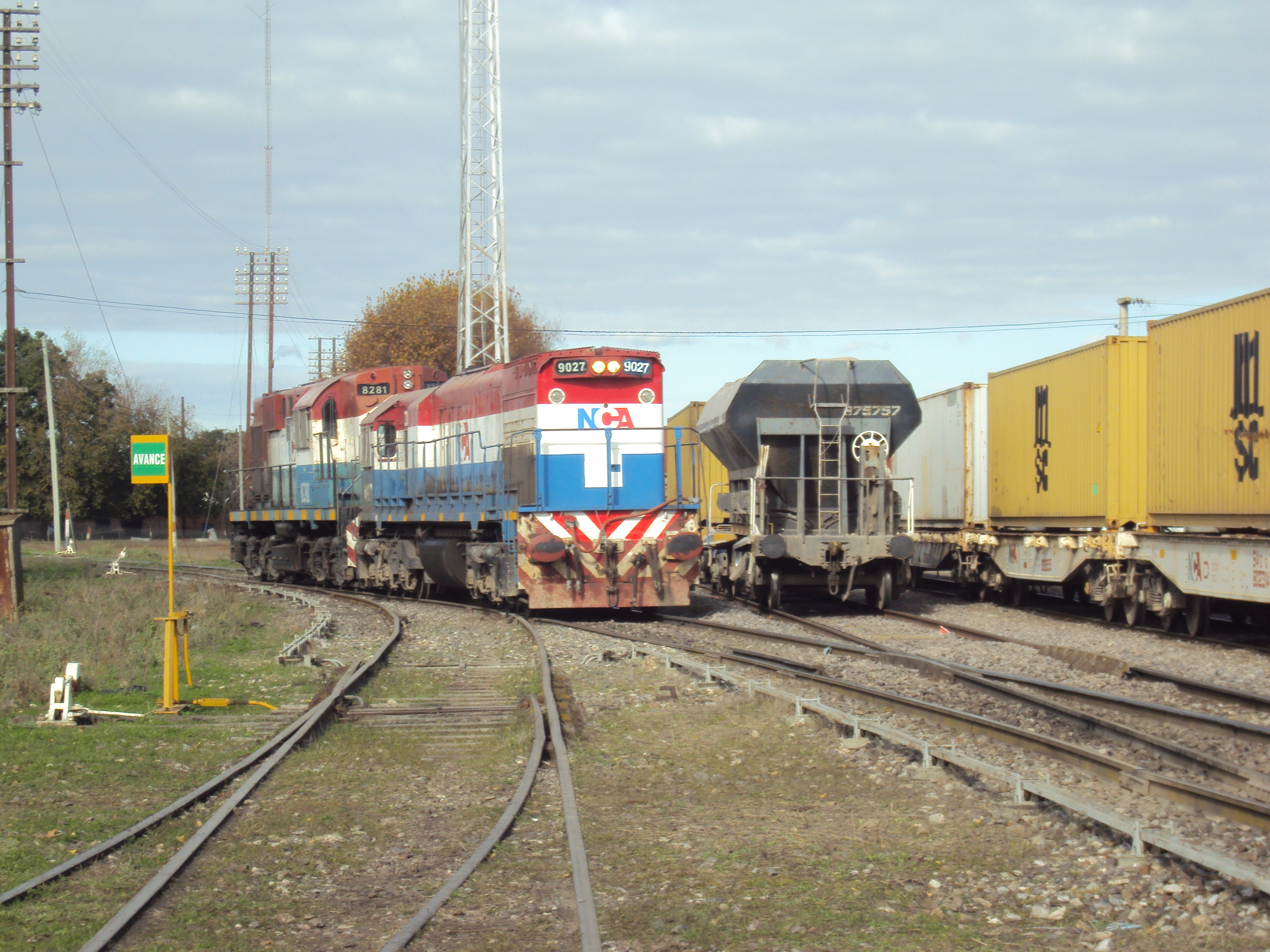
Nuevo Central Argentino took over Mitre Railway

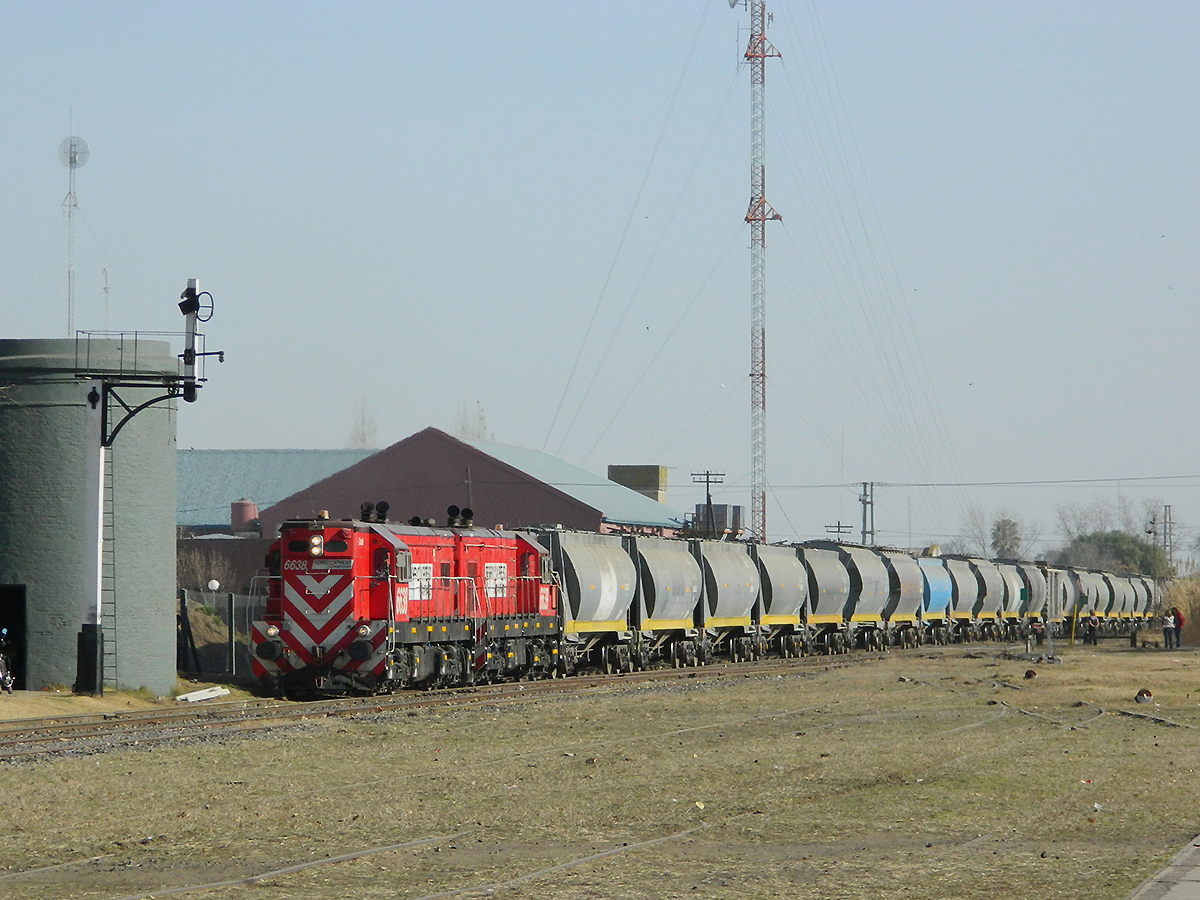
Ferroexpreso Pampeano operated Sarmiento Railway

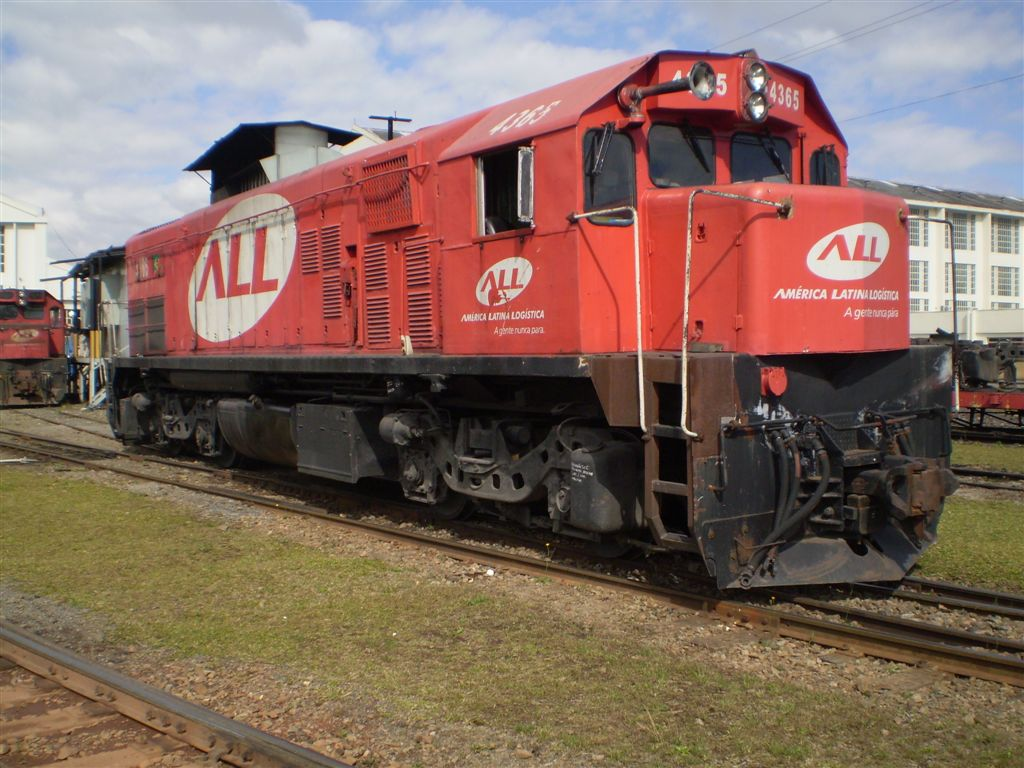
América Latina Logística worked on Urquiza and San Martín networks

Although FA supported the idea of operating the freight line in competition with private companies, the Ministry of Public Works (assisted by the World Bank) excluded FA from the activity, allowing only private concessionaires to operate the lines. In 1990 a program of restructuring was signed by FA, the Ministry and the World Bank. That agreement was the first official document to suggest the possibility to exclude FA from the operation of public transport.

The government granted concessions for a term of 30 years, extendable to 10 years. It was also established that investments made by private operators became property of the state when the contract of concession finished. The concessionaire only kept the rolling stock or other goods acquired during the term of concession.

For freight transport, the government established zones of interest according to traffic. The first section was Rosario–Bahía Blanca with a traffic estimated in 2,000,000 tons per year along its 5,300-km length. The second section was the Urquiza Railway with 1,200,000 tons per year along a length of 2,700 km. The third section was Mitre Railway with 2,500,000 tons (also considering the possibility of passenger services) along a length of 4,800 km. The San Martín Railway was included as the fourth section, with a length of 4,700 km.

The majority of Roca Railway was granted in concession to Ferrosur Roca, property of Loma Negra, the largest cement producer in Argentina. The San Martín was granted to Buenos Aires al Pacífico, while Sarmiento was granted to Ferroexpreso Pampeano (owned by Techint), Urquiza to Ferrocarril Mesopotámico, and Mitre to Nuevo Central Argentino.

Only the Belgrano Railway freight service remained under the control of the state due to lack of interest from private investors. Nevertheless, the railway would be granted to Belgrano Cargas, a consortium established by the railway union Unión Ferroviaria in 1999. That same year, Brazilian company América Latina Logística took over the Urquiza and San Martín lines, replacing Ferrocarril Mesopotámico and BAP respectively.

Freight services were granted in concession as follows:

Freight services privatisation
Concessionaire	Railway/s	Gauge (mm)	Length (km)	Period
Ferroexpreso Pampeano	Sarmiento, Roca (Note: Only the Rosario and Puerto Belgrano line.)	1,676	5,094	1991–2022
Nuevo Central Argentino	Mitre	1,676	4,900	1992–2022
Ferrosur Roca	Roca	1,676	3,145	1993–2023
Buenos Aires al Pacífico (Note: Not to be confused with the British-owned company Buenos Aires and Pacific Railway, the original concessionary and builder of the line that had been awarded concession in 1872.)	San Martín	1,676	5,690	1993–1999
Mesopotámico General Urquiza	Urquiza	1,435	2,704	1993–1999
América Latina Logística	Urquiza	1,435	2,704	1999–2013
América Latina Logística	San Martín	1,676	5,690	1999–2013
Belgrano Cargas (Note: Taken over by state-owned Belgrano Cargas y Logística in 2013.)	Belgrano	1,000	9,860	1999–2013

== Passenger services ==
=== Commuter rail (Buenos Aires) ===
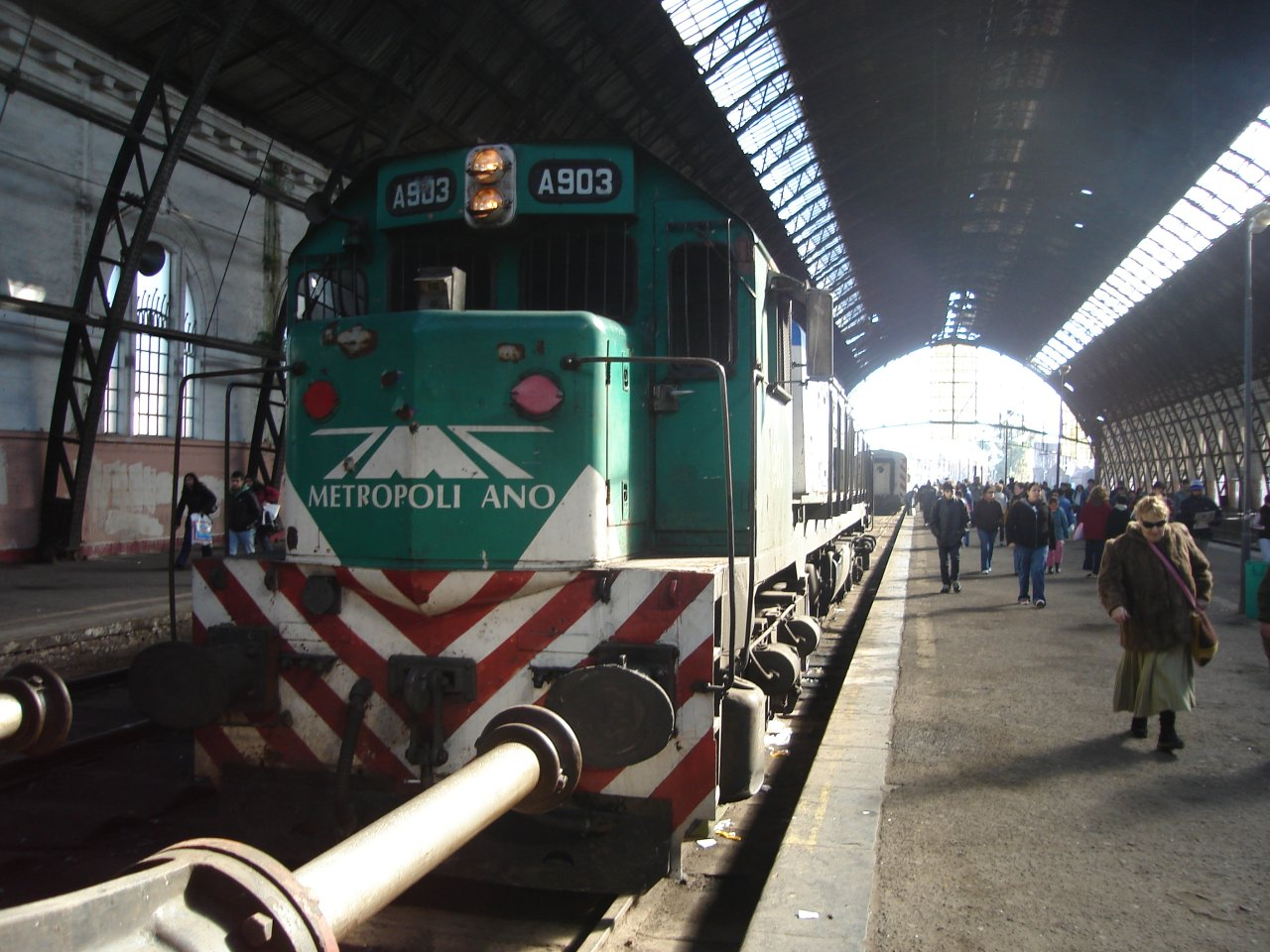
A EMD GT22CW hauled Metropolitano train in La Plata

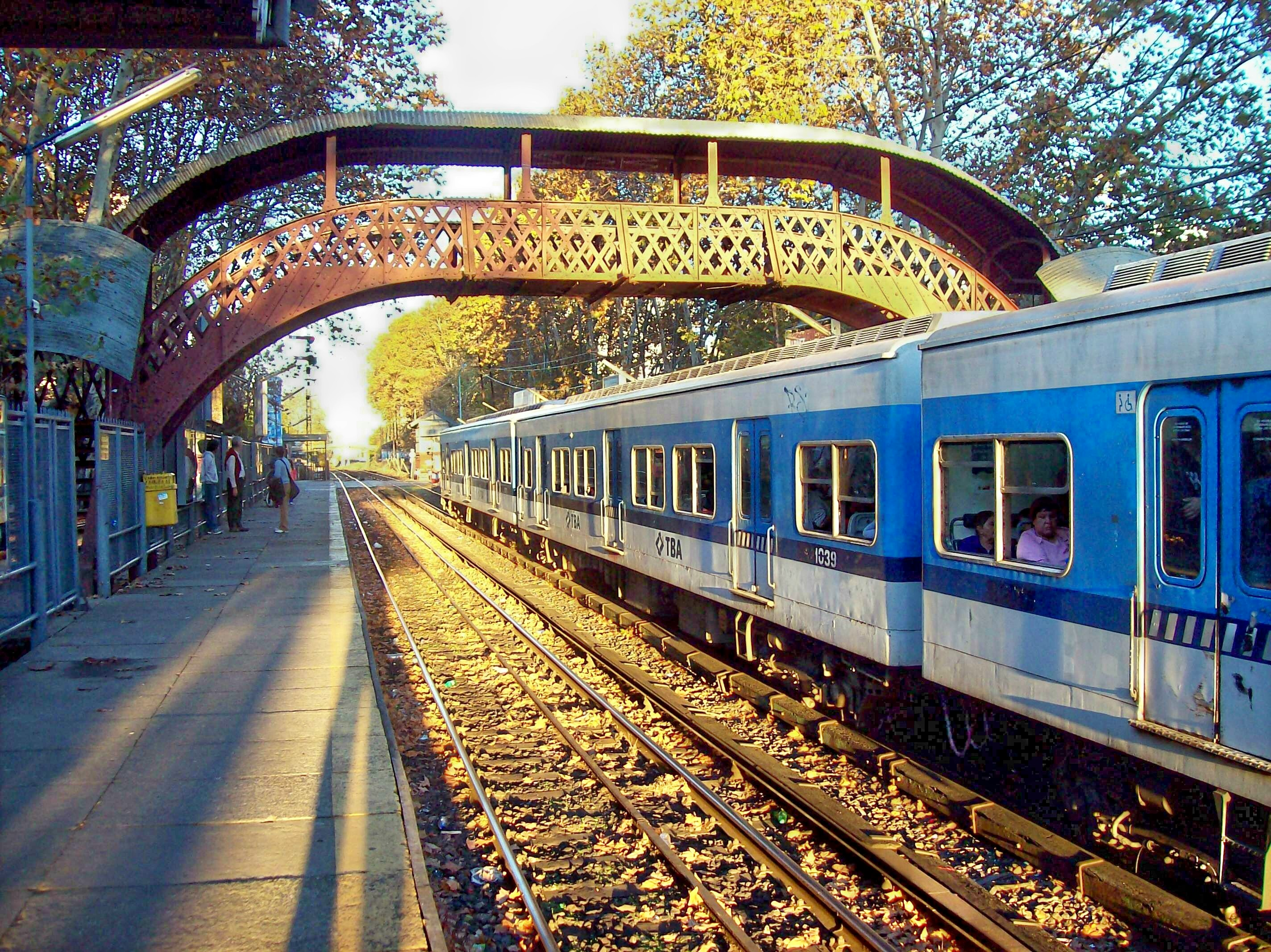
TBA operated Mitre and Sarmiento lines

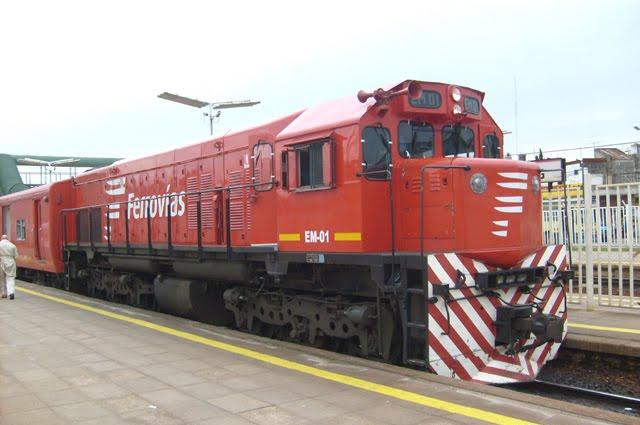
Ferrovías train at Grand Bourg

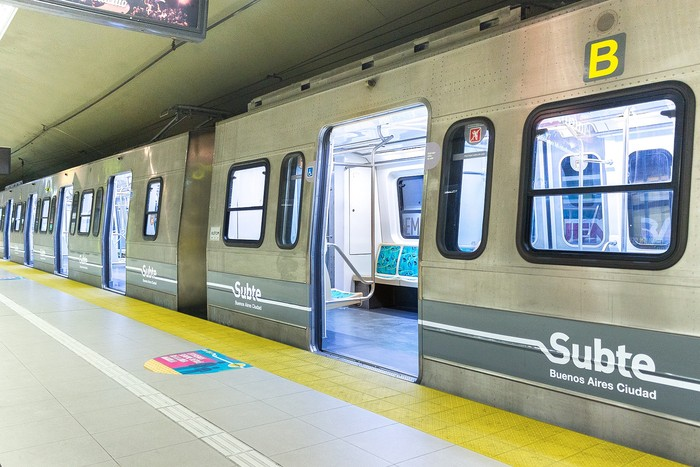
Buenos Aires Underground unit

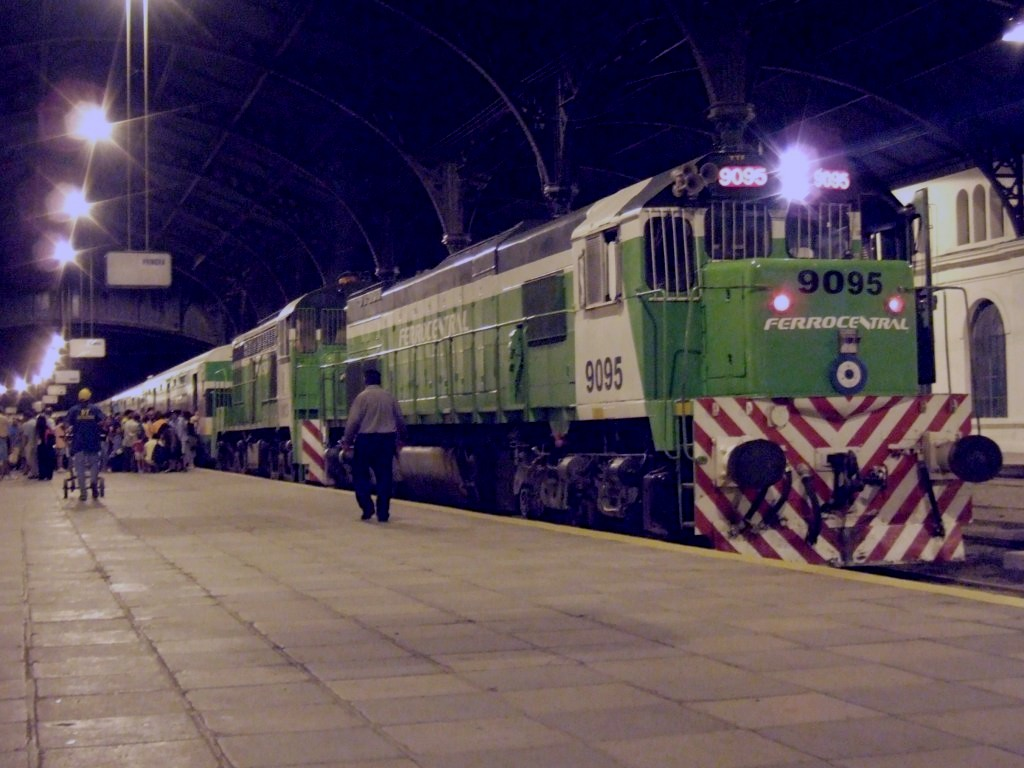
Ferrocentral ran trains to Tucumán

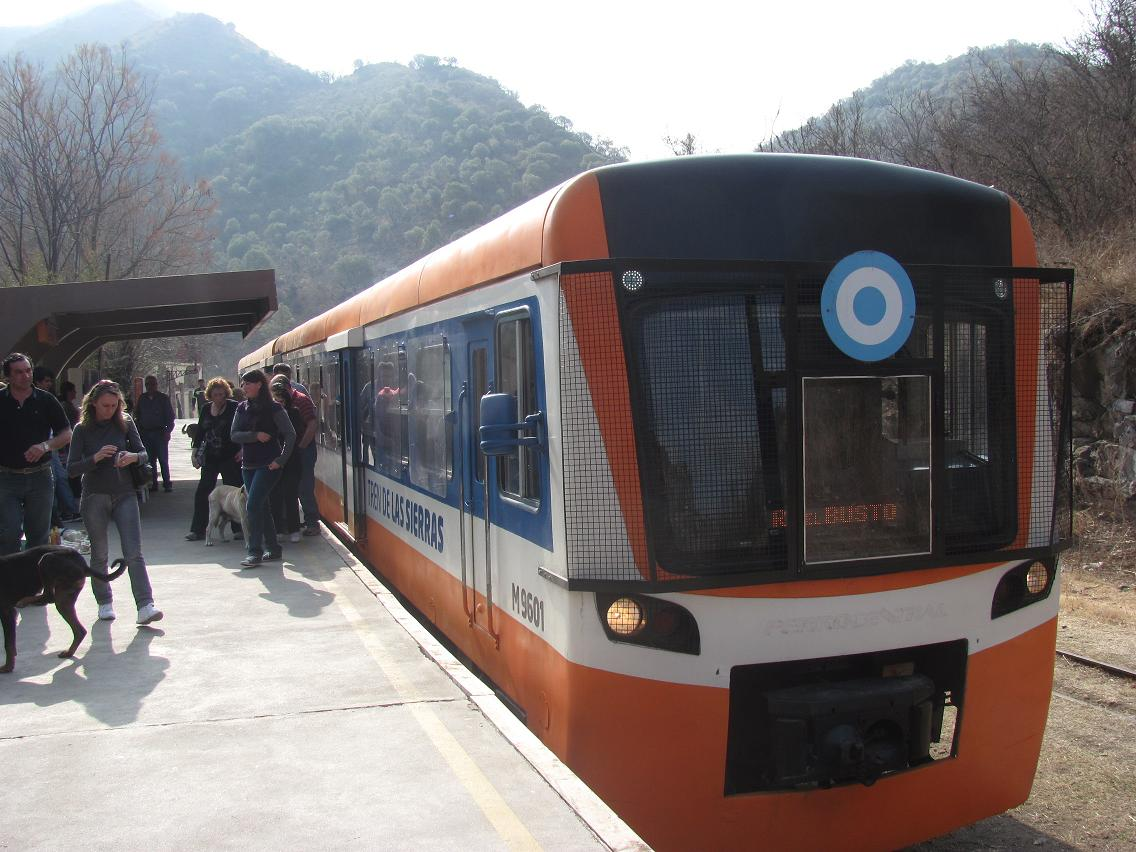
Tren de las Sierras served by Ferrocentral

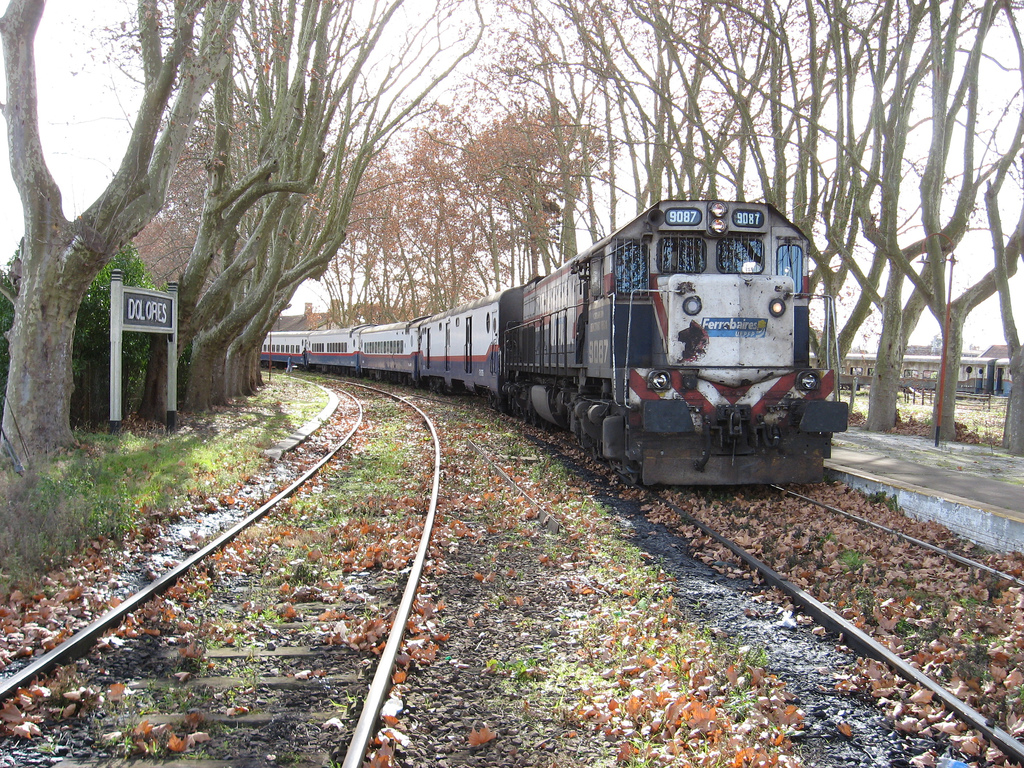
Ferrobaires was created by the government of Buenos Aires

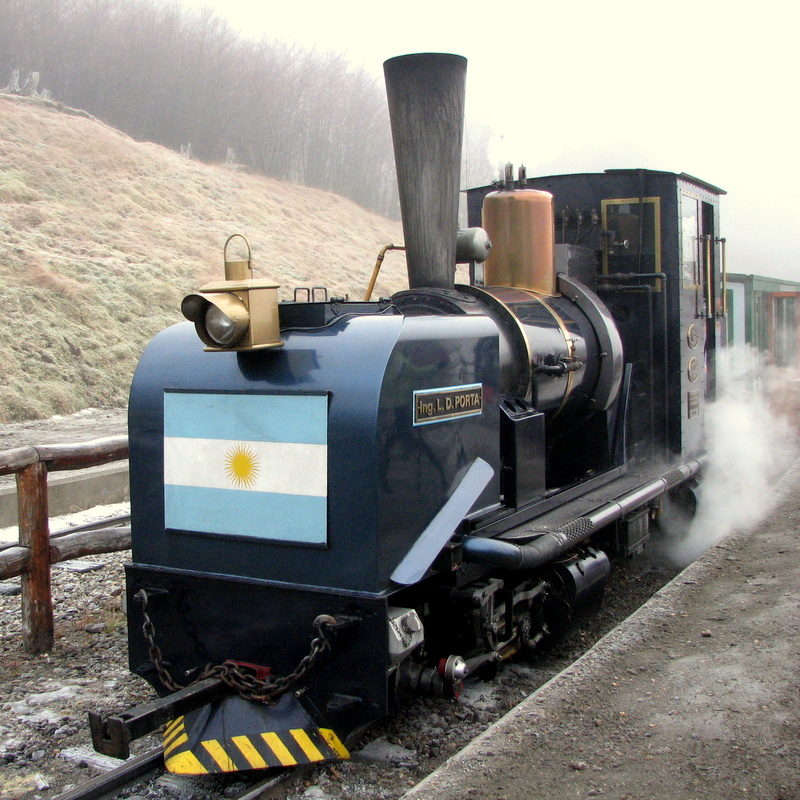
The Southern Fuegian Railway was revived in 1994

In March 1991 the government separated the urban passenger rail services and metro operating within the city of Buenos Aires from the rest of the rail network, and to this end created the holding company FEMESA. Whilst the freight concessionaires were expected to make a profit, it was recognized that the operation of these services would require public subsidy. Concessions were granted to the bidder who would require the lowest subsidy. Four companies bid successfully for the seven lines originally operated by the six divisions of Ferrocarriles Argentinos, together with the Subte, as shown below:

- Note: only concessionaires from the original privatisation process started in 1993 are listed.

Passenger services privatisation
Concessionaire	Line/s	Gauge (mm)	Length (km)	Period
Metrovías	Urquiza	1,435	26	1994–present
Metrovías	Subte	1,435	44	1994–present
Metropolitano	San Martín	1,676	55	1994–2007
Metropolitano	Roca	1,676	252	1995–2007
Metropolitano	Belgrano Sur	1,000	58	1994–2007
Ferrovías	Belgrano Norte	1,000	52	1994–present
Trenes de Buenos Aires	Mitre	1,676	182	1995–2012
Trenes de Buenos Aires	Sarmiento	1,676	167	1995–2012
Tren de la Costa (Note: Taken over by Trenes Argentinos Operadora Ferroviaria when contracts of concession were revoked or expired.)	Mitre	1,435	15,5	1995–2013

The concessions were mainly for 10 years, with an optional 10-year extension, except for the Metro and the Línea Urquiza which were for an initial term of 20 years. As in the case of the freight concessions, the government maintained ownership of the assets, whilst the concessionaires undertook the operation of their services as described in their original bids. Maximum fares were set by the government but were subject to automatic increases according to service quality and the prevailing rate of inflation. Financial penalties would be levied if agreed levels of service were not achieved.

In spite of these companies receiving large government subsidies, the services operated by Metropolitano deteriorated to a point where the concession for the operation of Línea San Martín was revoked in 2004 and concessions for the operation of the other two lines by the company were revoked in 2007. All three lines were subsequently operated by transitional private consortium UGOFE.

Trenes de Buenos Aires operated the Mitre and Sarmiento lines until the concession was revoked after the Once rail disaster on February 22, 2012, at Once Station, Buenos Aires, in which 51 people died and at least 703 people were injured, TBA was placed under federal intervention on February 28; its concessions to operate the Mitre and Sarmiento lines were ultimately revoked on May 24. After the cancellation of the contact, both lines were taken over by transitional consortium Unidad de Gestión Operativa Mitre Sarmiento (UGOMS). Metrovías took over the operation of the Buenos Aires Subte, the Buenos Aires Premetro, and the Urquiza Line in 1994, and established an earlier closing time of 23:00 on all three systems in order to conduct extensive maintenance and reconstruction, which was retained even after the reconstruction was completed. Numerous proposals to extend the operating hours of all three Metrovías-operated services have failed.

When UGOFE and UGOMS were dissolved, Corredores Ferroviarios (a company part of Grupo Roggio, which also owns Metrovías) and Argentren took over the Mitre/San Martín and Belgrano Sur/Roca lines, respectively. The company operated both lines until the government rescinded the agreement with the company in March 2015.

Apart from Corredores Ferroviarios, other private company, Argentren, was granted concession to operate the Roca and Belgrano Sur lines. The contract was also revoked by the government in March 2015.

=== Other rail services ===
On 20 May 1992 the government announced that all inter-city passenger services, other than Buenos Aires to Mar del Plata, would be discontinued on 1 January 1993, unless provincial authorities either agreed to assume responsibility for them or selected a private concessionaire to operate them on their behalf.

Provincial governments that took over the services to avoid closures were:

- Buenos Aires, establishing state-owned company Ferrobaires. The company started operating services in 1993 but was closed in 2016 after several accidents and derailment due to obsolete rolling stock and lack of maintenance.
- Chaco Province operated trains through state-owned Servicios Ferroviarios del Chaco (1999–2010)
- Tucumán also operated a railway service to Buenos Aires to keep the line active. Services started in 1992 but ceased in 1997.
- Río Negro created its own company named Tren Patagónico to operate trains from Viedma to Bariloche that had been under concession since 1993.

On the other hand, La Trochita was never privatised and closed in 1992 due to the lack of interest of private investors. Nevertheless, the line would be later reopened, being currently cooperatively operated by the governments of Río Negro and Chubut provinces.

Long-distance and tourist services granted to private companies are listed below:

Other passenger services privatisation
Concessionaire	Division	Gauge (mm)	Length (km)	Period
Tucumán Ferrocarriles	Retiro–Tucumán	1,676	1,260	1997–2000
Ferrocentral (Note: Taken over by Trenes Argentinos Operadora Ferroviaria when contracts of concession were revoked or expired.)	Retiro–Tucumán	1,676	1,260	2004–2014
Ferrocarriles Mediterráneos	Córdoba–Villa María	1,676	150	1992–2004
Ferrocentral	Tren de las Sierras	1,000	150	2007–13
Servicios Ferroviarios Patagónico	Viedma–Bariloche	1,676	826	1993–?
Trenes Especiales Argentinos	F. Lacroze–Posadas	1,435	1,060	2003–2011
(unknown)	Southern Fueguian (Note: The Southern Fueguian was not included into any railway division after 1948 nationalisation. It remained closed from 1952 until 1994 when the SF was granted in concession to a private company that completely rebuilt the line.)	0,500	7	1994–present
(unknown)	Tren a las Nubes (Note: Taken over by the Government of Salta after the last concession was revoked.)	1,000	217	1991–2005
EcoTren	Tren a las Nubes	1,000	217	2005–2014

== Bibliography ==
- Reshaping Argentina's Railways by Jorge H. Kogan & Louis S. Thompson – Japan Railway Review
