= Juliet and her Nurse =

Painting by J. M. W. Turner

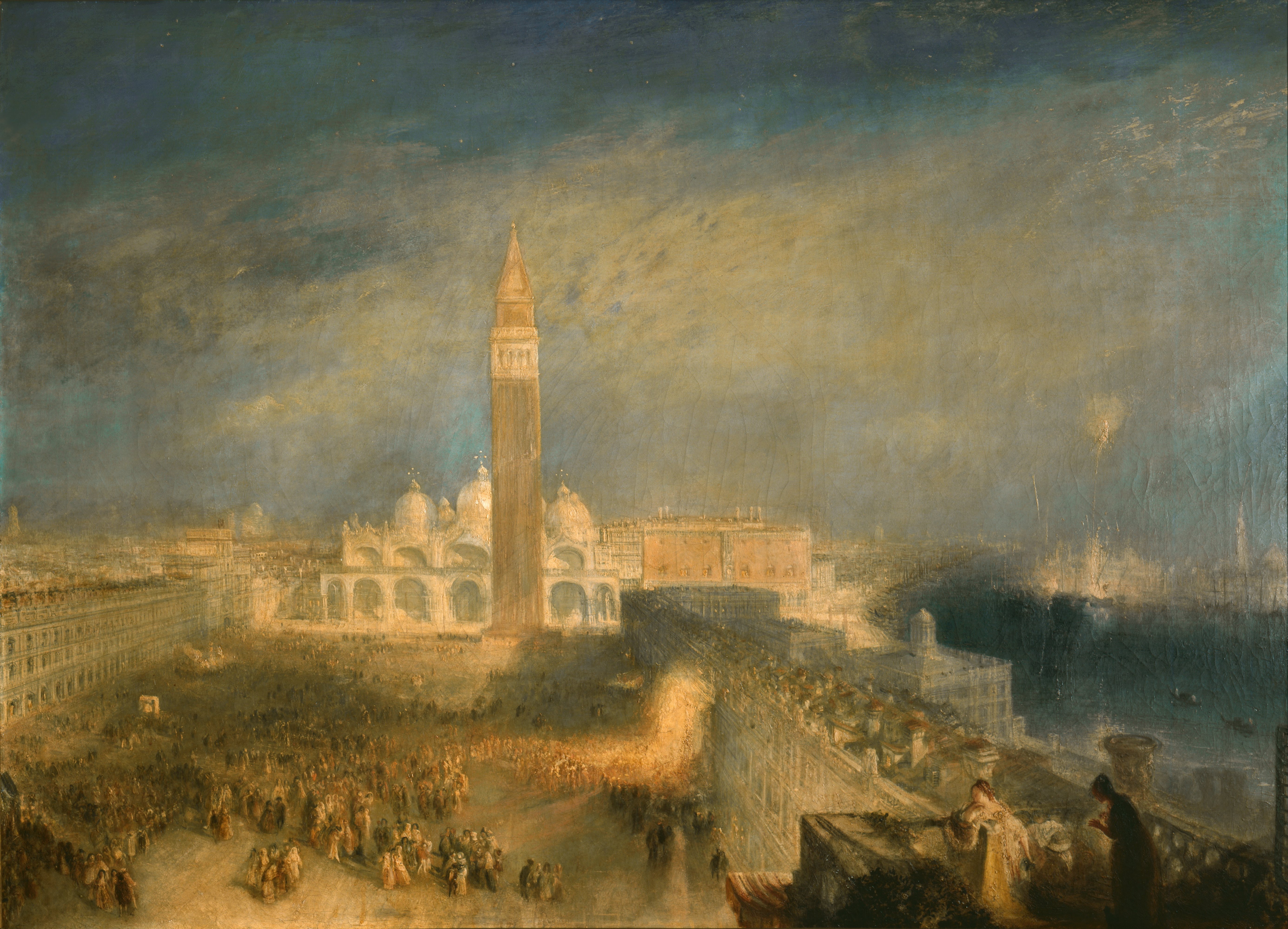
- Artist: J. M. W. Turner
- Year: 1836
- Medium: Oil on canvas
- Dimensions: 88 cm × 121 cm (35 in × 48 in)
- Location: AMALITA Collection, Buenos Aires
- Website: coleccionamalita.org.ar/...1836

Juliet and her Nurse is an oil painting by Joseph Mallord William Turner in the AMALITA Collection, Buenos Aires. Painted in 1836, it depicts a view of Venice at dusk. The scene features a crowd of Venetians who have assembled in St. Mark's Square to watch fireworks exploding against a blue and yellow sky. On a balcony in the lower right corner stand Juliet and her nurse, two characters from the play Romeo and Juliet by English playwright William Shakespeare. In a departure from Romeo and Juliet's Verona setting, Turner incongruously placed the characters in Venice instead.

Turner's first visit to Venice was in 1819 and he made his second visit in 1833, where he appears to have taken a room with rooftop views. Juliet and her Nurse was painted from an elevated perspective overlooking St. Mark's Square to the east with St Mark's Campanile dominating the composition. In 1842, it was engraved by George Hollis with the title St Mark's Place, Venice.

When it was exhibited at the Royal Academy in 1836, the painting received criticism due to its abstract elements. The Times remarked that the painting "set all the laws of that truth-telling science, both lineal and aerial, at defiance". A critic writing for the Literary Gazette complained about the placement of the two Shakespearean characters in the lower right corner, describing them as "perched, like sparrows, on a house-top". John Eagles writing for Blackwood's Magazine unfavourably critiqued the painting as "a strange jumble -- 'confusion worse confounded." John Ruskin wrote that the review had raised in him "black anger" and prompted him to write a response in defence of Turner. He wrote, "Turner is an exception to all rules... In a widely magnificent enthusiasm, he rushes through the ethereal dominions of the world of his own mind -- a place inhabited by the spirit of things... Turner thinks and feels in color; he cannot help doing so... Innumerable dogs are baying at the moon; do they think she will bate of her brightness, or abberate from the majesty of her path?"

On 29 May 1980, the painting was auctioned at Sotherby Parke-Bernet and sold for $6.4 million, making it the most expensive work of art sold at auction at that time. The sale was made by Flora Whitney Miller, honorary chairman of Whitney Museum of American Art, whose family had owned it since 1901. The buyer was Argentine heiress Amalia Lacroze de Fortabat. The AMALITA Collection, an art museum created to house Fortabat's collection, opened in 2008 where the work is displayed.

In The Washington Post, Paul Richard described the painting as an example of Turner's "poetic, visionary, cataclysmic pictures".

== See also ==
- List of paintings by J. M. W. Turner
