= Loma Negra =

Cement business in Argentina

Loma Negra C.I.A.S.A.
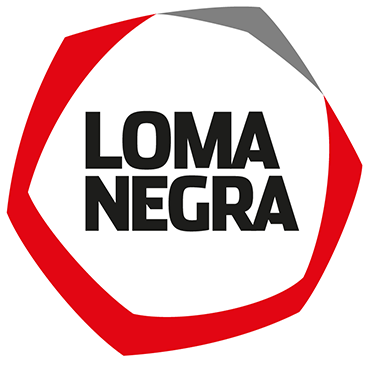
- Type: Public
- Traded as: BCBA: LOMA; NYSE: LOMA (ADS) MERVAL component
- Industry: Construction
- Founded: 1926; 100 years ago
- Founder: Alfredo Fortabat
- Headquarters: Buenos Aires, Argentina
- Key people: Amalia Lacroze (owner, president)
- Products: Cement; Portland cement Concrete; Lime
- Revenue: ▲US$ 1.8 billion (2010)
- Number of employees: 3,200
- Parent: InterCement
- Website: lomanegra.com

Loma Negra Companía Industrial Argentina S.A. is an Argentine manufacturer and the country's leading maker of cement, concrete, and lime. The company, established by businessman Alfredo Fortabat, also founded its own sports club, C.S.yD. Loma Negra three years later. After the passing of Alfredo Fortabat, his wife Amalia Lacroze took over the business.

Loma Negra is currently a subsidiary of InterCement Participações, a company of the Brazilian conglomerate Mover Participações, which acquired it for USD 1,000 million.

== History ==
The 1926 discovery of large limestone deposits by Alfredo Fortabat at his San Jacinto Estancia led to his decision to open a cement factory in the nearby pampas hamlet of Loma Negra (south of Olavarría); the choice of location prompted Fortabat to christen his new venture Loma Negra ("Black Hillock"). The cement plant was built in 1927, and by the early 1950s, this facility and one in nearby Barker produced 500,000 tons of cement annually.

New facilities in the Andes-range cities of San Juan and Zapala, opened during the 1960s, made Loma Negra the leader in cement and concrete production in Argentina; in the 1980s, the company opened its first Portland cement facility (in another Andes-range city, Catamarca).

Loma Negra lost its founder, Alfredo Fortabat, in 1976, following which his widow, María Amalia Lacroze de Fortabat, became the company's majority stakeholder, President and Chairperson. Loma Negra enhanced its market leadership position in its industry locally by acquiring the newly privatized Ferrosur Roca railway line and a chief competitor, Cementos San Martín S.A., in 1992; that year Fortabat inaugurated the group's new headquarters in downtown Buenos Aires.

The company diversified into the recycling industry in 1995 by launching Recycomb, whose plant was built in Cañuelas (west of Buenos Aires). The acquisition of five concrete producers in 1998-99 made Loma Negra the national leader in that construction staple, as well, and a plant opened in 2001 gave it a 1.6 million-ton production capacity of clinker for Portland cement. The Loma Negra Technical Center, opened in March 1999, is the only one of its type in Latin America.

Debts of US$270 million incurred largely during the economic crisis around 2001 and Mrs. Fortabat's own, advanced age prompted the grande dame of Argentine industry to sell her 80% stake in Loma Negra, however. The company was thus transferred to Brazilian conglomerate Camargo Corrêa in May 2005, for just over US$1 billion.

Loma Negra, at the time, accounted for half of the 6 million tons of cement produced nationwide. Following a period of rapid growth in the Argentine economy, nearly 10 million tons of cement were produced in Argentina annually in 2007-08 - of which Loma Negra retained a 48% market share; in 2008, Mexican cement giant Cemex expressed interest in acquiring a majority stake in Loma Negra.

Despite a modest decline in local construction activity since 2008 as a result of global financial instability, a US$235 million, five-year program to expand capacity by 20% was announced in November.
