= Dirce Camargo =

- Born: Dirce Navarro; 1913; Brazil
- Died: 20 April 2013 (aged 100); Brazil
- Occupation: Businesswoman
- Known for: Former chairman of Camargo Corrêa
- Spouse: Sebastião Camargo
- Children: 3

Dirce Navarro De Camargo 1913 — 20 April 2013) was a Brazilian billionaire businesswoman and the richest woman in Brazil, with a net worth of US$13.8 billion when she died.

Her husband, Sebastião Camargo, who died in 1994, founded the privately traded Brazilian conglomerate Camargo Corrêa. Dirce Camargo was chairman from 1994 to 1996, and was a major shareholder.

Camargo died on 20 April 2013, aged 100. Bloomberg reported in 2013, that her three daughters, Regina de Camargo Pires Oliveira Dias, Renata de Camargo Nascimento and Rosana Camargo de Arruda Botelho were "poised to inherit the family fortune", as each holds an equal share of the holding company. In 2013, the three daughter heiresses were ranked 15th, 16th and 17th in the list of the richest in the country. The individual fortune of each one added R$ 7.46 billion.
