= Baps =

Baps or BAPS may refer to:

- Ballarat Agricultural and Pastoral Society, operates an agricultural show at the Ballarat Showgrounds, Victoria, Australia
- B.A.P.S, a 1997 comedy feature film
- Plural of bap, a type of bread roll
- BAPS (song), 2019, by Trina and Nicki Minaj
- Becoming a Pop Star, 2019 EP by Yanga Chief
- Bochasanwasi Akshar Purushottam Swaminarayan Sanstha (BAPS), a Hindu denomination within the Swaminarayan Sampradaya
- British Association of Paediatric Surgeons
- Broken Arrow Public Schools, Oklahoma, United States

== See also ==
- BAP (disambiguation)
