= Alfredo Fortabat =

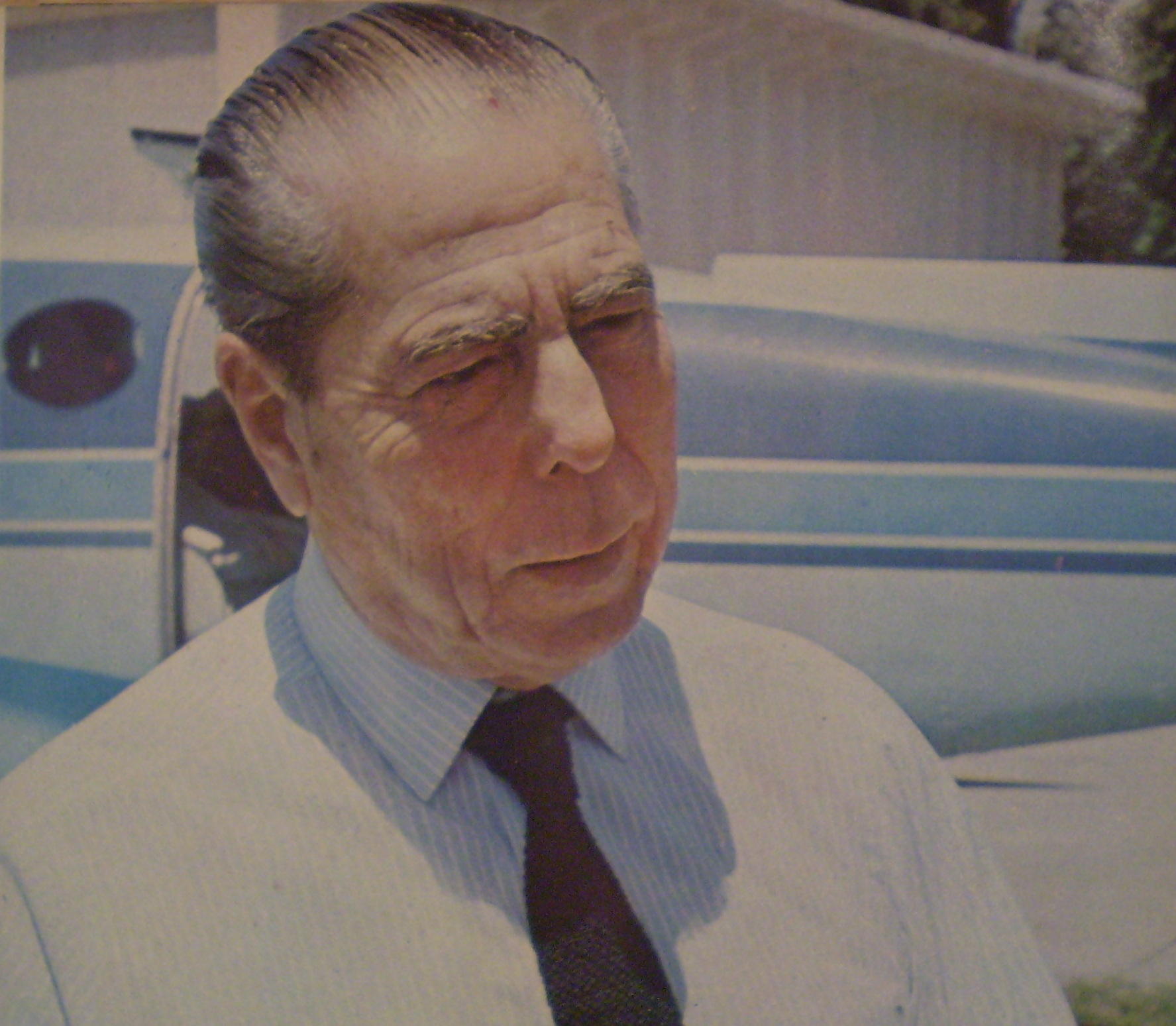
- Alfredo Fortabat in 1970
- Born: 13 May 1894; Buenos Aires, Argentina
- Died: 10 January 1976 (aged 81); Buenos Aires
- Occupation: Businessperson
- Spouse(s): Elisa Corti Maderna; María Amalia Lacroze de Fortabat (1947-1976)

== Life and times ==
Alfredo Fortabat was born in Azul, a small city in Buenos Aires Province, on 19 May 1894; his parents, Helene Pourtal and Lucien Fortabat, were recently arrived French Argentines. Lucien Fortabat was named Director of Azul's important French language school and later Director of the Banco Comercial, which enabled his son, Alfredo, to attend the Sorbonne. The elder Fortabat died in 1921, however, and upon Alfredo's return in 1924, local cement kiln owners encouraged him to invest in the growing industry.

The 1926 discovery of large limestone deposits at the San Jacinto Estancia inherited from his father led Fortabat to open a cement factory in the nearby pampas hamlet of Loma Negra (south of Olavarría); the choice of location prompted him to christen the company Loma Negra ("Black Mound"). The cement plant was built in 1927, and Fortabat protected his venture in its early years partly by buying voting shares in competitors' boards.

Fortabat, whose marriage to Magdalena Corti Maderna ended in divorce, met a young Buenos Aires heiress, Amalia Lacroze, during a 1941 Teatro Colón function, and the two began a relationship. Planning to wed, they were impeded by Argentina's then-conservative nuptial laws, which precluded separated couples from remarrying. The marriage, which ultimately took place in neighboring Uruguay, became recognized in Argentina following a reform signed into law by President Juan Perón, in 1951. Mrs. Fortabat's gregariousness and knowledge of four foreign languages helped create a close business partnership as well as marriage, though it later suffered from a number of publicly reported infidelities.

Loma Negra grew alongside the Argentine economy; by the early 1950s, the company produced 500,000 tons of cement annually and accounted for 70% of the cement sold to the Ministry of Public Works, for instance (his prominence as a building materials supplier during the Perón years triggered investigations against Loma Negra following the populist leader's 1955 overthrow, though charges were later dropped). New facilities in the Andes-range cities of San Juan and Zapala, opened during the 1960s, made Loma Negra the leader in cement and concrete production nationally.

The industrialist invested generously in employee housing and in 1930, established a largely self-contained community adjacent the cement works ("Villa Alfredo Fortabat"). The proprietor of 160,000 hectares (400,000 acres) of prime pampas land in his later years, he established the charitable Amalia Lacroze de Fortabat Foundation, in 1971.

Alfredo Fortabat died in Buenos Aires on January 19, 1976, upon which his widow became the President and nearly sole owner of Loma Negra.
