= Ferrocarriles Mediterráneos =

Former Argentina rail company (1999–2003)

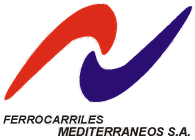
- Type: S.A.
- Industry: Railway
- Predecessor: Ferrocarriles Argentinos
- Founded: 1999 in Argentina
- Defunct: 2003; 23 years ago
- Fate: Defunct
- Successor: Ferrocentral
- Headquarters: Córdoba, Argentina
- Area served: Buenos Aires; Córdoba
- Services: Public transport

Ferrocarriles Mediterráneos S.A. (FEMED) was an Argentine company which operated a 5 ft 6 in (1,676 mm) broad gauge railway line between Córdoba and Villa María originally built by the British-owned Central Argentine Railway, which became part of Ferrocarril General Bartolomé Mitre after railway nationalization in 1948.

== History ==
As part of a national railway privatisation plan, carried out under the presidency of Carlos Menem, a concession to operate the line was granted to the government of Córdoba Province in 1992 and was later transferred to FEMED, a cooperative composed of former rail workers, in January 1999.

During its first months of existence FEMED focused on the repair and repainting of locomotives and coaches. The Córdoba Mitre station was also set as company headquarters. The company received some EMD GT-22 to operate.

Although plans included to run trains to Retiro, Villa María, Alta Gracia and Río Cuarto, the company could run only a daily service from Córdoba to Villa María.

At the end of 2003 the Government of Córdoba revoked the concession granted to FEMED, and private company Ferrocentral took over the service, beginning to operate trains to Villa María in August 2004, then adding services to Córdoba in April 2005.
