= Ferrosur Roca =

Argentine freight transport company

Ferrosur Roca S.A.

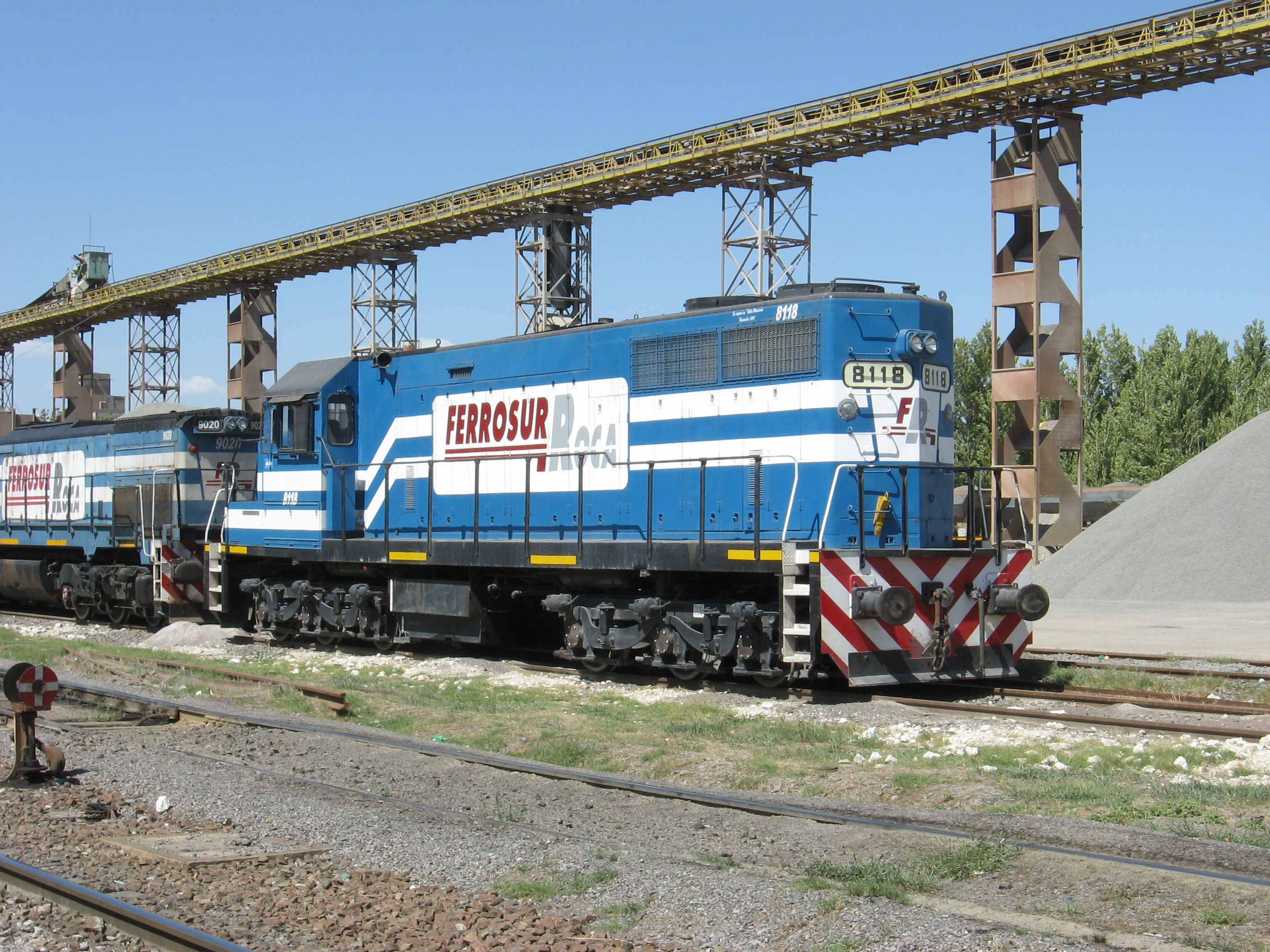
- Locomotive Brian 8118 (GE U18F reformated) stopped in Cañuelas station, Buenos Aires
- Company type: S.A.
- Industry: Transport
- Founded: 1993; 33 years ago in Argentina
- Headquarters: Argentina
- Area served: Buenos Aires; Río Negro; Neuquén
- Production output: 5,258,301 tonnes carried (2014)
- Services: Rail freight transport
- Parent: Mover Participações

Ferrosur Roca S.A. (FR) is a private company which operates freight services over part of the 5 ft 6 in (1,676 mm) broad gauge that belongs to General Roca Railway.

Some of the products transported by Ferrosur Roca include salt, clincker, plaster, cement, lime, cereals, fertilizers, coking coal, iron scrap, petroleum and fuel oil, among other items. The company transported a total of 5,258,301 tonnes of freight in 2014.

The company, property of Mover Participações (formerly, Camargo Correa), is 80% owned by the Cofesur group, 16% state-owned, and 4% owned by employees of the company through Personal de Ferrosur S.A.

== History ==
After all the Argentine rail network was privatised during Carlos Menem's administration in early 1990s, concession was granted to Ferrosur Roca to operate freight services in the center and south of Argentina running on Ferrocarril Roca tracks.

The company began its activities on March 12, 1993 over a 3,342 km (2,077 mi) rail network extending south and southwest from Buenos Aires through the provinces of Buenos Aires, Rio Negro and Neuquén and serving the ports of Bahía Blanca, Quequén and San Antonio Oeste. The branch from Bahía Blanca to Zapala serves the commercially important Rio Negro fruit-growing region.

Ferrosur's fleet include 2,550 wagons, 31 mainline diesel locomotives and 15 shunters and its rail network has points of connection with other freight services operated by Ferroexpreso Pampeano, Nuevo Central Argentino and Rumo Logística.
