= Buenos Aires al Pacífico =

Former Argentine freight rail company (1993–2000)

Buenos Aires al Pacífico S.A.
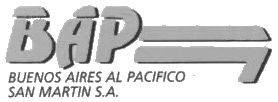

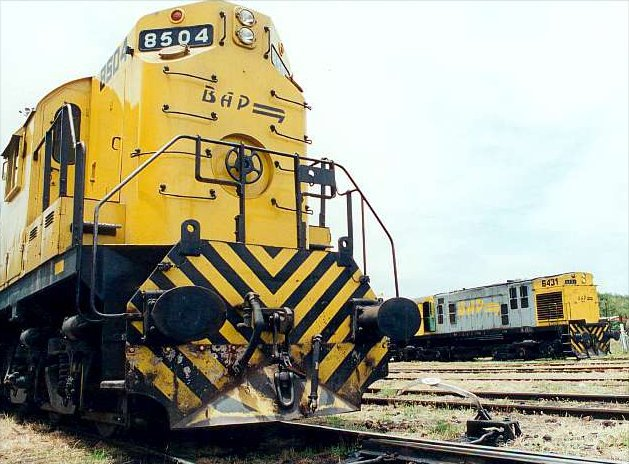
- BAP freight trains in 1999
- Type: Private S.A.
- Industry: Rail transport
- Predecessor: Ferrocarriles Argentinos
- Founded: 1993 in Mendoza, Argentina
- Founder: Enrique Pescarmona
- Defunct: 2000; 26 years ago
- Successor: América Latina Logística
- Headquarters: Mendoza, Argentina
- Area served: West of Argentina
- Key people: Enrique Pescarmona, owner
- Production output: 2,928,171 t (2,881,925 long tons; 3,227,756 short tons) (2000)
- Services: Rail freight transport
- Net income: 43,005 (2000)
- Owner: Industrias Metarlúgicas Pescarmona (IMPSA)

Buenos Aires al Pacífico S. A. (abbreviated BAP) was an Argentine company that exploited the operation and infrastructure of the 1,676 mm (5 ft 6 in) San Martín Railway freight rail transport system.

BAP operated 5,690 kilometres (3,540 mi) of 5 ft 6 in (1,676 mm) Indian gauge cargo in the provinces of Buenos Aires, San Juan, San Luis and Mendoza.

The San Martín Railway freight service is currently operated by Belgrano Cargas y Logística after the Government of Argentina rescinded the contract signed with América Latina Logística (ALL) in 2013.

== History ==
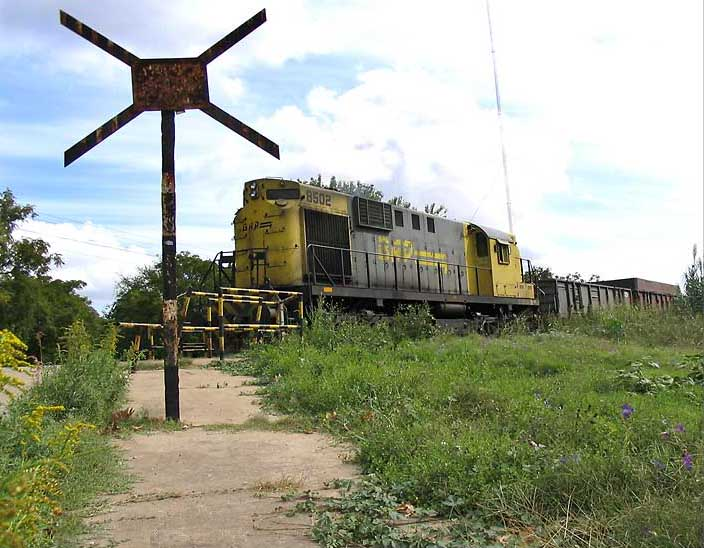
A train at a level crossing.

As part of the railway privatisation carried out during the presidency of Carlos Menem, BAP was granted a concession to operate the San Martín freight railway services that had been managed by defunct Ferrocarriles Argentinos since 1949. The company was part of the consortium "Industrias Metalúrgicas Pescarmona" (IMPSA) that had been also granted the Urquiza Railway system to be operated by sister company "Ferrocarril Mesopotámico-Urquiza".

During its first years of operation (1994) the company carried 2,439,729 tonnes (2,401,197 long tons; 2,689,341 short tons) of cargo. Nevertheless, in 1998, Industrias Metarlúgicas Pescamona (IMPSA), owner of BAP and Ferrocarril Mesopotámico (that had been granted concession to operate passenger services), announced that they would retire from the rail transport, selling the 73,5% of BAP and the 70,5% of FM to Brazilian company Ferrovía Sul Atlántico (FSA). Nevertheless, the Government of Argentina, owner of the entire railway network granted in concession, did not allow the operation due to the failure of IMPSA to comply with the terms and conditions of the contract of concession, with unpaid charges for over A$ 130 million.

In 2000, the operation of San Martín Railway line was taken over by "ALL Central", a subdivision of Brazilian company América Latina Logística.
