= Rumo Logística =

Brazilian logistic company

- Formerly: América Latina Logística
- Type: Sociedade Anônima
- Traded as: B3: RAIL3; Ibovespa Component
- Industry: Transport
- Founded: 2008; 18 years ago
- Headquarters: Curitiba, Brazil
- Area served: Brazil
- Key people: João Alberto Fernandez de Abreu, (CEO)
- Services: Intermodal freight transport
- Revenue: ▲US$ 1.7 billion (2018)
- Net income: ▲US$ 70.3 million (2018)
- Number of employees: 8,500
- Parent: Cosan
- Subsidiaries: Brado Logística
- Website: rumolog.com

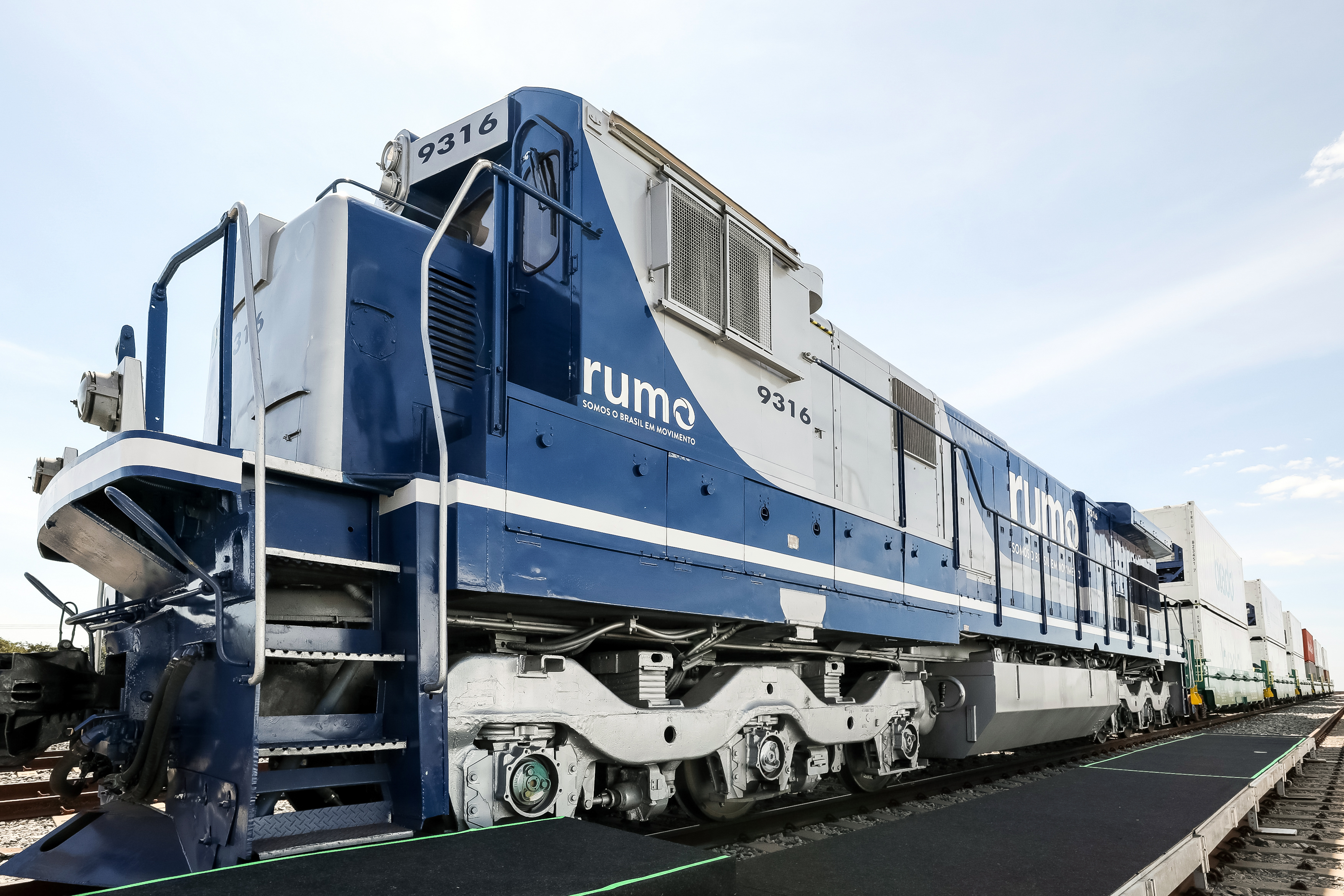
2019 North-South Railway Concession Contract Signing Ceremony

Rumo, formerly known as América Latina Logística (ALL), is a Brazilian logistic company, mainly focused in the railway line logistics in Brazil, being the largest company in Latin America in this segment. The company also provides transportation services such as logistics, intermodal transport, port operations, movement and storage of merchandise, administration of storage facilities and general storage.

It is also involved in leasing railroad equipment to third parties, and offers road transport services in Brazil through "América Latina Logística Intermodal S.A."

== History ==
Predecessor company América Latina Logística was founded as "Ferrovia Sul Atlântico" in 1997 and is headquartered in Curitiba, Paraná state. Pursuant to a privatization process it began operating lines in Paraná, Santa Catarina, and Rio Grande do Sul. It began operations in São Paulo state in 1998, and later (2001) acquired Delara Ltda, a Brazilian logistics company also operating in Argentina, Chile, and Uruguay. Operations were extended to Mato Grosso and Mato Grosso do Sul through acquisition in 2006. There are connections with the standard gauge rail networks in Paraguay and Uruguay and with the 1,000 mm (3 ft 3 3/8 in) metre gauge network in Brazil.

The company assumed its current name after acquisition of its Argentine railway interests in 1999. There it partnered with Railroad Development Corporation and the Argentine government until June 2013 in the operation of two freight services:

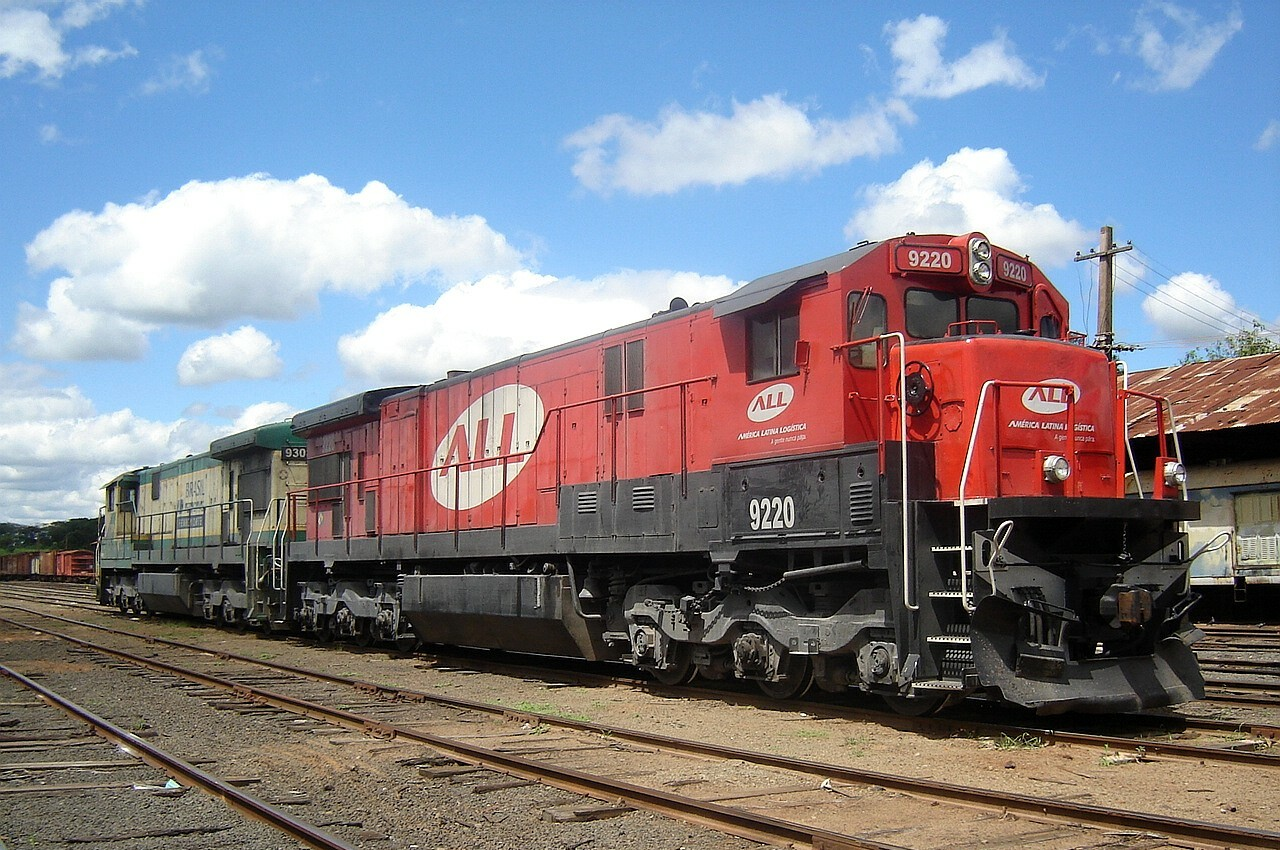
Diesel-electric locomotive GE C30-7 in former ALL livery

- "ALL Mesopotámica" operated the 1,435 mm (4 ft 8 1/2 in) standard gauge network built by the British-owned Entre Ríos and East Argentine railway companies which extends north from the city of Buenos Aires into the provinces of Entre Ríos, Corrientes and Misiones. Those lines had become part of the state-owned General Urquiza Railway after railway nationalisation in 1948. With the privatisation of the entire railway network in Argentina, the 2,739 km (1,702 mi) Urquiza Railway was given in concession to private company "Ferrocarril Mesopotámico – General Urquiza S.A." on October 22, 1993.
- "ALL Central" operated the 5 ft 6 in (1,676 mm) broad gauge network built by the British-owned Buenos Aires and Pacific Railway which extends westwards from the city of Buenos Aires into the western provinces of Mendoza and San Juan. Those lines had become part of the state-owned San Martín Railway after nationalisation. The 5,284 km (3,283 mi) had been previously operated by private company Buenos Aires al Pacífico (BAP) that took over on August 26, 1993.

On June 4, 2013, the Argentine government cancelled ALL's concessions due to contract violations by failing to invest and accumulating fines worth 30 percent of the concession. The head of Trenes Especiales Argentinos, which had operated passenger services on the General Urquiza Railway, has publicly supported the decision, claiming that ALL was responsible for the deterioration of the standard gauge network.

ALL operated a subsidiary named "Brado Logistics" which handled intermodal freight.

In 2014, ALL merged with Rumo (owned by Brazilian conglomerate Cosan) to form a company valued at R$11,000 million.

On 6 May 2024, Rumo announced a partial interruption of its activities due to the heavy rains and flooding affecting Rio Grande do Sul, the country's southernmost state.

== See also ==
- Rail transport in Brazil
- Rail transport in Argentina
- Railroad Development Corporation
