= Backhaul Adaptation Protocol =

Backhaul Adaptation Protocol (BAP) is a layer 2 Routing protocol used in 5G for Integrated Access and Backhaul (IAB) .

This protocol is specified by 3GPP in TS 38.340.

The purpose of BAP is to deliver packets to a destination node over multiple hops. BAP is located on top of the 3GPP RLC-layer.

A BAP PDU is either a Data PDU or a Control PDU.

Data PDUs are used to transport upper layer data along a path towards a destination. A BAP Data PDU has the following format:

- D/C bit to indicate if the PDU is BAP Control PDU (value 0) or a BAP Data PDU (value 1)
- 3 Reserved bits
- 10 bits destination BAP address
- 10 bits path id
- Data to be transported, e.g. an IP packet

Control PDUs are used to indicate backhaul radio link failures, to poll for flow control information and to provide flow control feedback. A BAP Control PDU has the following format:

- D/C bit to indicate if the PDU is BAP Control PDU (value 0) or a BAP Data PDU (value 1)
- 4 bits PDU type
  - 0000 = Flow control feedback per BH RLC channel
  - 0001 = Flow control feedback per routing ID
  - 0010 = Flow control feedback polling
  - 0011 = Backhaul Radio Link Failure (BH RLF) indication
- 3 Reserved bits

Further information is dependent on PDU type. For flow control feedback per BH RLC channel, available buffer size is given per BH RLC channel. For flow control feedback per routing ID, available buffer size is given per BAP routing ID (which consists of BAP address and path ID). No further information is given in the flow control feedback polling and the BH RLF indication.
