= Mover Participações =

Brazilian private conglomerate

Mover Participações S.A.
- Formerly: Camargo Corrêa S.A.
- Type: Private conglomerate
- Industry: Transport; Construction; Siderurgy
- Founded: 1939; 87 years ago
- Founder: Sebastião Camargo
- Headquarters: São Paulo, Brazil
- Area served: Worldwide
- Key people: Dirce Camargo
- Services: Real estate, construction, crude oil and natural gas, electric energy, transportation
- Revenue: ▼US$9.2 billion (2012)
- Net income: ▼US$460.7 million (2012)
- Number of employees: 61,000
- Subsidiaries: CCDI; Ferrosur Roca; InterCement
- Website: moverpar.com.br

Mover Participações (formerly Camargo Corrêa) is one of the biggest Brazilian private conglomerates. It is composed of publicly traded and closed companies, as well as shared management, and operates in Brazil and more than 20 countries. The company was founded in 1939 by Sebastião Camargo in the city of Jaú, in the interior of the State of Sao Paulo, but now is headquartered in São Paulo.

Camargo's widow Dirce Camargo was a major shareholder until her death in 2013, with a net worth of $11.5 billion.

The current Chairman of the Board is Wilson Brumer.
