= Southern Winds Airlines =

Argentine airline, 1996–2005

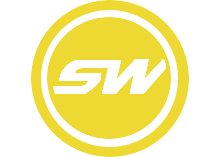
IATA	ICAO	Call sign
A4	SWD	SOUTHERN WINDS
- Founded: 1996
- Commenced operations: 1996
- Ceased operations: December 5, 2005
- Operating bases: Buenos Aires–Aeroparque; Buenos Aires-Ezeiza; Córdoba (AR)
- Frequent-flyer program: Value Miles
- Alliance: Líneas Aéreas Federales (2003-2005)
- Fleet size: 14
- Destinations: 19
- Headquarters: Córdoba, Argentina
- Key people: Juan Maggio (president and founder)
- Website: www.fly-sw.com

Southern Winds Airlines (also known as SW Airlines) was an Argentine commercial air carrier that operated from 1996 until 2005. Southern Winds was founded by Juan Maggio, who served as president of the company.

== History ==
Initially a domestic carrier, Southern Winds began offering connections to international flights in 1997. The airline's own international operations were authorized by the Argentine Government in 2001. At its peak, Southern Winds operated an extensive domestic network, international flights within the South American region, and intercontinental services from Buenos Aires to Miami and Madrid; and charter destinations like Florianopolis, Porto Seguro, Camboriu, Tacna and Punta Cana. Hubs were maintained in Córdoba (from 1996) and Buenos Aires (from 1999).

Southern Winds' fleet was composed initially by Bombardier and later the Boeing passenger planes.

Though the company was founded as a passenger carrier, cargo transport services began in 2000 under the brand name SW Cargo. In 2003, an alliance was struck between Southern Winds and the Argentine-state owned Líneas Aéreas Federales (LAFSA) that involved utilization by LAFSA of Southern Winds' flight infrastructure.

By 2004, Southern Winds was a leading commercial carrier in the troubled Argentine aviation industry. That September, however, airport police in Madrid discovered 60 kilograms (130 lb) of cocaine packed in four unaccompanied suitcases aboard an arriving Southern Winds flight. The resulting scandal cost the airline its government subsidy, and ultimately resulted in the carrier's collapse.

The last flight was operated on December 5, 2005, although several proposals for the airline's revival continued to surface by 2006.

== Records: ==
Southern Winds hold for several years in a row the world fleet record of hours and cycles per day in averange all year round with values between 10 to 12 cycles and with a ratio on 1,1 ~1,2 hr/cycle.

== Destinations ==
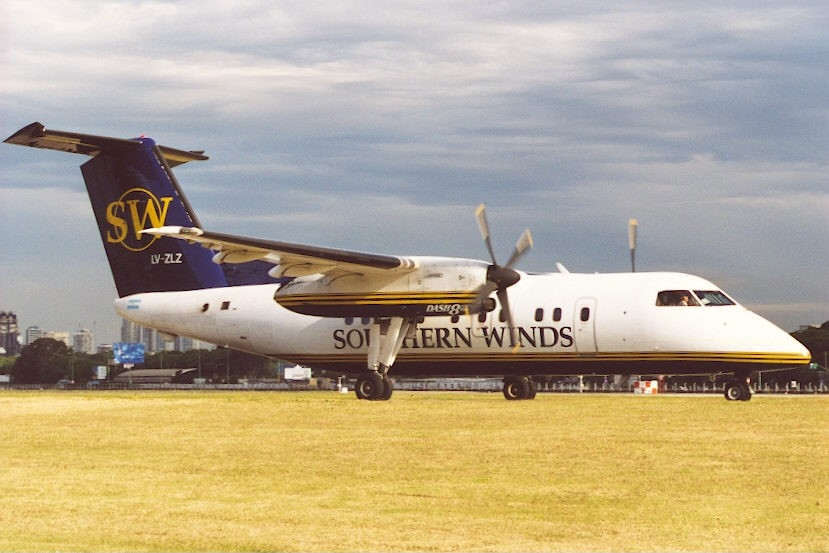
A Southern Winds De Havilland Canada Dash 8-100 at Aeroparque Jorge Newbery in 2000

- Argentina
  - Bariloche (San Carlos de Bariloche Airport)
  - Buenos Aires (Aeroparque Jorge Newbery) Base
  - Buenos Aires Ministro Pistarini International Airport) Base
  - Comodoro Rivadavia (General Enrique Mosconi International Airport)
  - Córdoba (Ingeniero Aeronáutico Ambrosio L.V. Taravella International Airport) Base
  - El Calafate (Comandante Armando Tola International Airport)
  - Mar del Plata (Astor Piazzolla International Airport)
  - Mendoza (Governor Francisco Gabrielli International Airport)
  - Neuquén (Presidente Perón International Airport)
  - Puerto Iguazú (Cataratas del Iguazú International Airport)
  - Resistencia (Resistencia International Airport)
  - Río Gallegos (Piloto Civil Norberto Fernández International Airport)
  - Salta (Martín Miguel de Güemes International Airport)
  - San Juan (Domingo Faustino Sarmiento Airport)
  - San Martín de los Andes (Aviador Carlos Campos Airport)
  - Tucumán (Teniente General Benjamín Matienzo International Airport)
  - San Salvador de Jujuy (Gobernador Horacio Guzmán International Airport)
  - Ushuaia (Ushuaia – Malvinas Argentinas International Airport)
- Peru
  - Tacna (Coronel FAP Carlos Ciriani Santa Rosa International Airport)
- Spain
  - Madrid (Adolfo Suárez Madrid–Barajas Airport)
- United States
  - Miami (Miami International Airport)

== Fleet ==
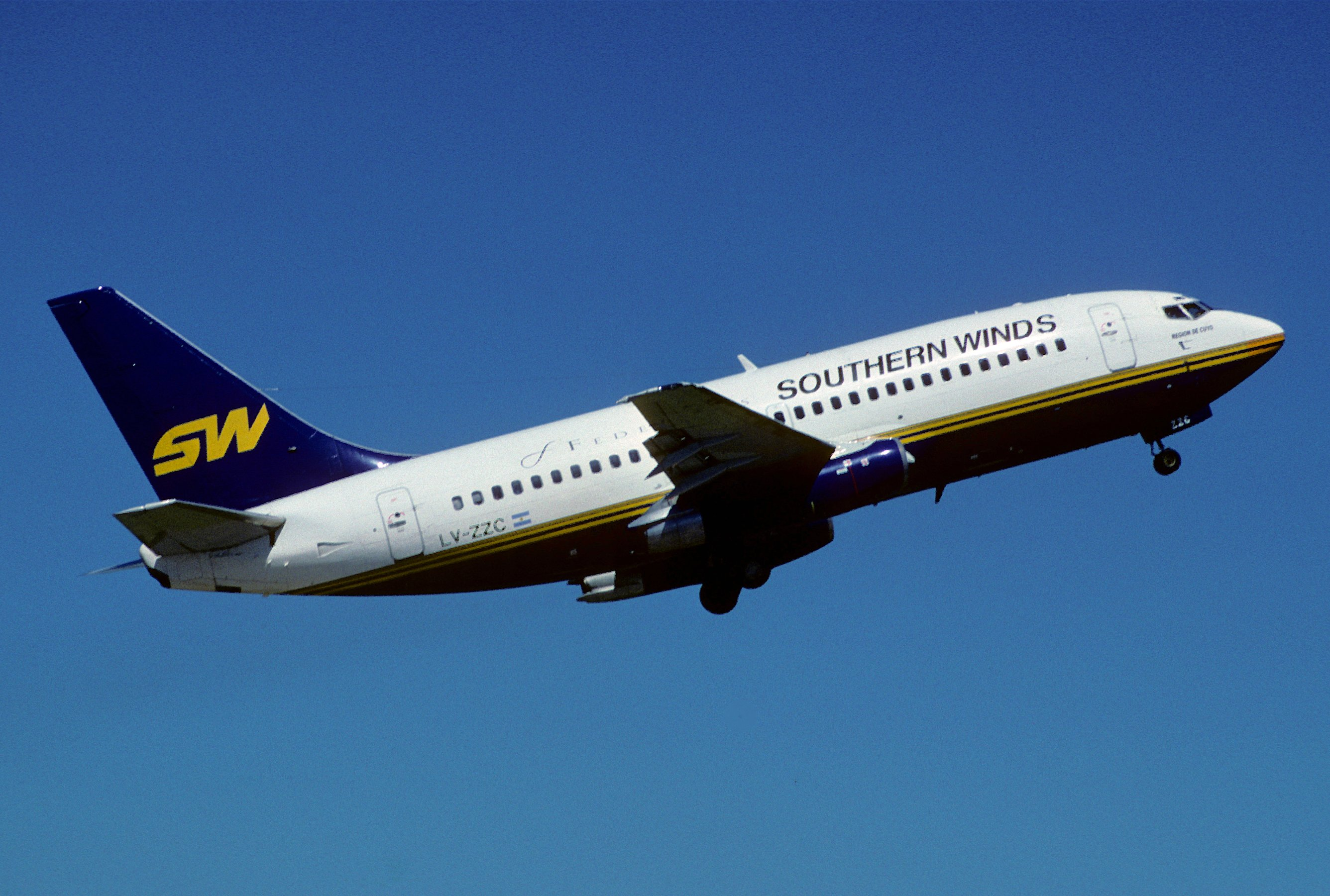
A Southern Winds Boeing 737-200 taking off from Aeroparque Jorge Newbery in 2004

Southern Winds operated the following aircraft during its operations:

Southern Winds fleet
Aircraft	Total	Introduced	Retired	Notes
Beechcraft 300 Super King	1	1996	2005	
Boeing 737-200	9	2002	2005	
Boeing 747-200B	1	2004	2005	
Boeing 767-300ER	3	2002	2005	Leased from Air Atlanta Icelandic and EuroAtlantic Airways
Bombardier CRJ-100	6	1996	2003	
Bombardier CRJ-200	3	1996	2003	
De Havilland Canada Dash 8-100	6	1998	2003	

== See also ==
- List of defunct airlines of Argentina
