= Santa Rosa Airport (Argentina) =

Airport in Argentina

Santa Rosa Airport Aeropuerto de Santa Rosa
- IATA: RSA; ICAO: SAZR

Summary
- Airport type: Public
- Operator: Aeropuertos Argentina 2000
- Serves: Santa Rosa, Argentina
- Elevation AMSL: 630 ft (190 m)
- Coordinates: 36°35′30″S 64°16′35″W

Map
- Location of airport in Argentina

Runways
Direction	Length		Surface
Direction	m	ft	Surface
01/19	2,300	7,546	Asphalt

Statistics (2016)
- Total passengers: 42,294
- Source: WAD SkyVector GCM

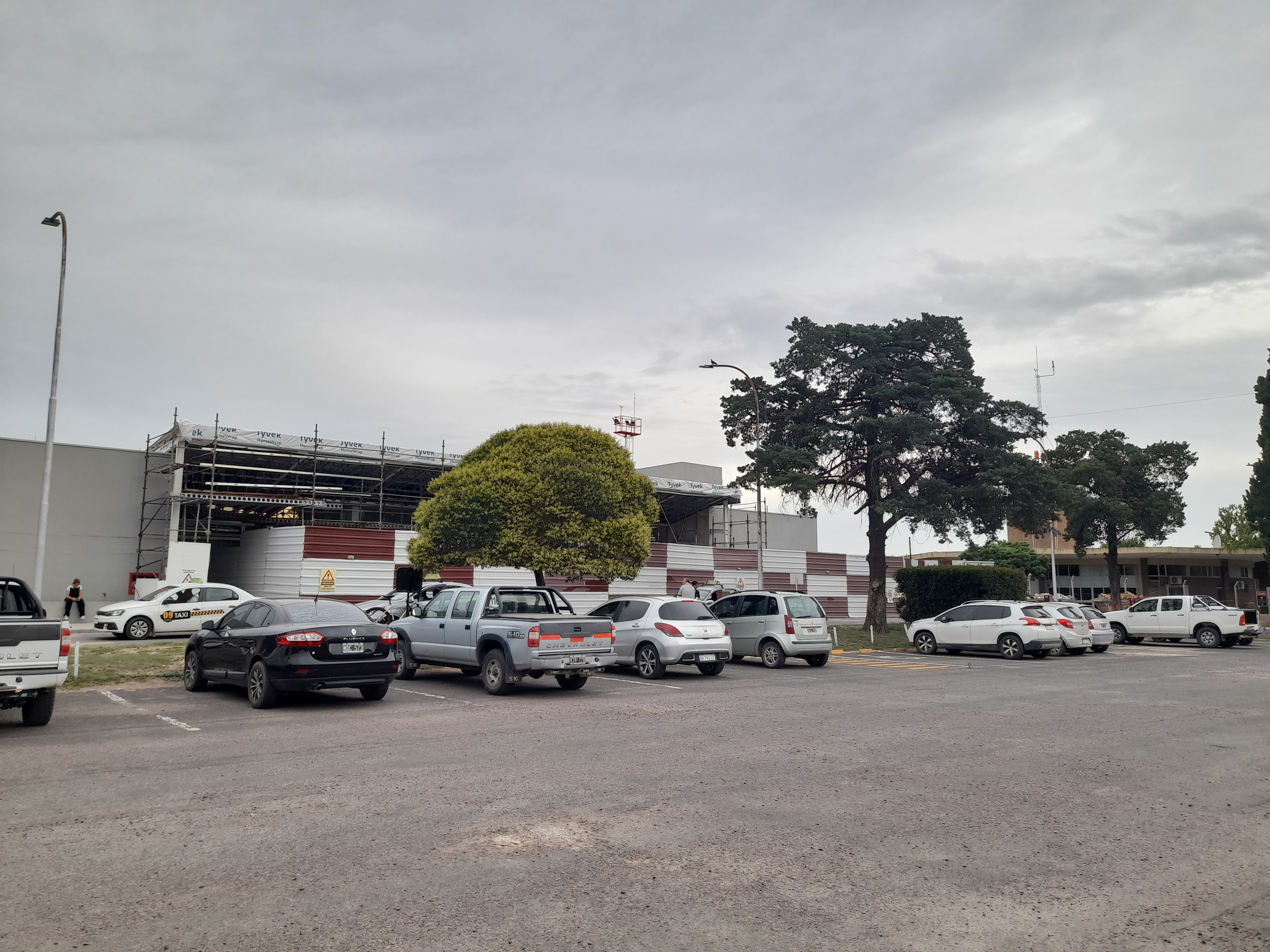

Santa Rosa Airport (Spanish: Aeropuerto de Santa Rosa) (IATA: RSA, ICAO: SAZR) is an airport in La Pampa Province, Argentina serving the cities of Santa Rosa and Toay. The airport is on the northeast corner of Santa Rosa.

== History ==
The airport was built in 1940. 1 September 1940 was the first regular flight to Santa Rosa, a military Junkers en route from Buenos Aires to Esquel Airport vía Santa Rosa, Neuquén, and San Carlos de Bariloche Airport.

The terminal was built in 1971. In 1988 the runway was extended to 2,300 metres (7,500 ft). An Instrument Landing System and radio beacon were installed in 1996, and in 1999, Aeropuertos Argentina 2000 took over management of the airport.

== Airlines and destinations ==
Santa Rosa was previously a destination of LADE, LAER, and Southern Winds. In 2007, 12915 passengers used the airport.

Airlines	Destinations
Aerolíneas Argentinas	Buenos Aires–Aeroparque

== See also ==
- Transport in Argentina
- List of airports in Argentina
