= Las Termas Airport =

Airport in Argentina

Termas de Río Hondo International Airport Aeropuerto Internacional de Termas de Río Hondo
- IATA: RHD; ICAO: SANR

Summary
- Airport type: Public / military
- Operator: Aeropuertos Argentina 2000
- Serves: Termas de Río Hondo, Argentina
- Elevation AMSL: 920 ft (280 m)
- Coordinates: 27°29′50″S 64°56′10″W

Map
- Location of airport in Argentina

Runways
Direction	Length		Surface
Direction	m	ft	Surface
01/19	2,500	8,202	Asphalt

Statistics (2016)
- Total passengers: 167.968
- Sources: AIP ORSNA SkyVector Google Maps

Termas de Río Hondo International Airport (Spanish: Aeropuerto Internacional de Termas de Río Hondo) (IATA: RHD, ICAO: SANR) is an airport serving the city of Termas de Río Hondo in Santiago del Estero Province, Argentina.

It was built between 2010 and 2012 by Aeropuertos Argentina 2000. The airport was inaugurated on 24 July 2012 by President Cristina Fernández de Kirchner; one month later the first flight from Buenos Aires landed at the airport.

Until the late 1970s, there was an airport here, but it was closed, as both Santiago del Estero, 60 kilometres (37 mi) away from Termas de Río Hondo, and San Miguel de Tucumán, 90 kilometres (56 mi) away, had airports with paved runways.

The airport is beside the Río Hondo Reservoir (es), 6 kilometres (4 mi) west of the city. South approach and departure are over the water. There is a 350 metres (1,150 ft) blast pad on Runway 19. The Termas de Río Hondo VOR-DME (Ident: TRH) is located on the field.

== Airlines and destinations ==
Airlines	Destinations
Aerolíneas Argentinas	Buenos Aires–Aeroparque

== See also ==
- Transport in Argentina
- List of airports in Argentina
