= Comandante Espora Airport =

Airport in Bahía Blanca, Argentina

Comandante Espora Airport Aeropuerto de Bahía Blanca - Comandante Espora
- IATA: BHI; ICAO: SAZB

Summary
- Airport type: Public / Military
- Owner/Operator: Municipalidad de Bahía Blanca
- Serves: Bahía Blanca, Argentina
- Elevation AMSL: 246 ft / 75 m
- Coordinates: 38°43′29″S 62°10′09″W
- Website: AeropuertoBahiaBlanca.com

Map
- Location of airport in Buenos Aires Province

Runways
Direction	Length		Surface
Direction	m	ft	Surface
06/24	2,030	6,660	Asphalt
17R/35L	1,498	4,915	Asphalt
17L/35R	2,616	8,583	Asphalt

Statistics (2024)
- Passengers: 238,900
- Passenger change 23-24: ▼16.2%
- Aircraft movements: 3,962
- Movements change 15–16: ▼33.2%
- Source: DAFIF, 2010 World Airport Traffic Report.

Comandante Espora Airport (IATA: BHI, ICAO: SAZB), also known as Bahía Blanca Airport, is a domestic airport in Bahía Blanca, Argentina, which is served by Aerolíneas Argentinas and LADE.

The airport shares its runways and its name with Comandante Espora Air Naval Base (Base Aeronaval Comandante Espora), named after Tomás Espora, a naval officer who fought in the 1810-25 Argentine War of Independence. Comandante Espora is the main base of the Argentine Navy‘s air arm, the Argentine Naval Aviation. The base was given the identifier BACE by the navy.

== History ==
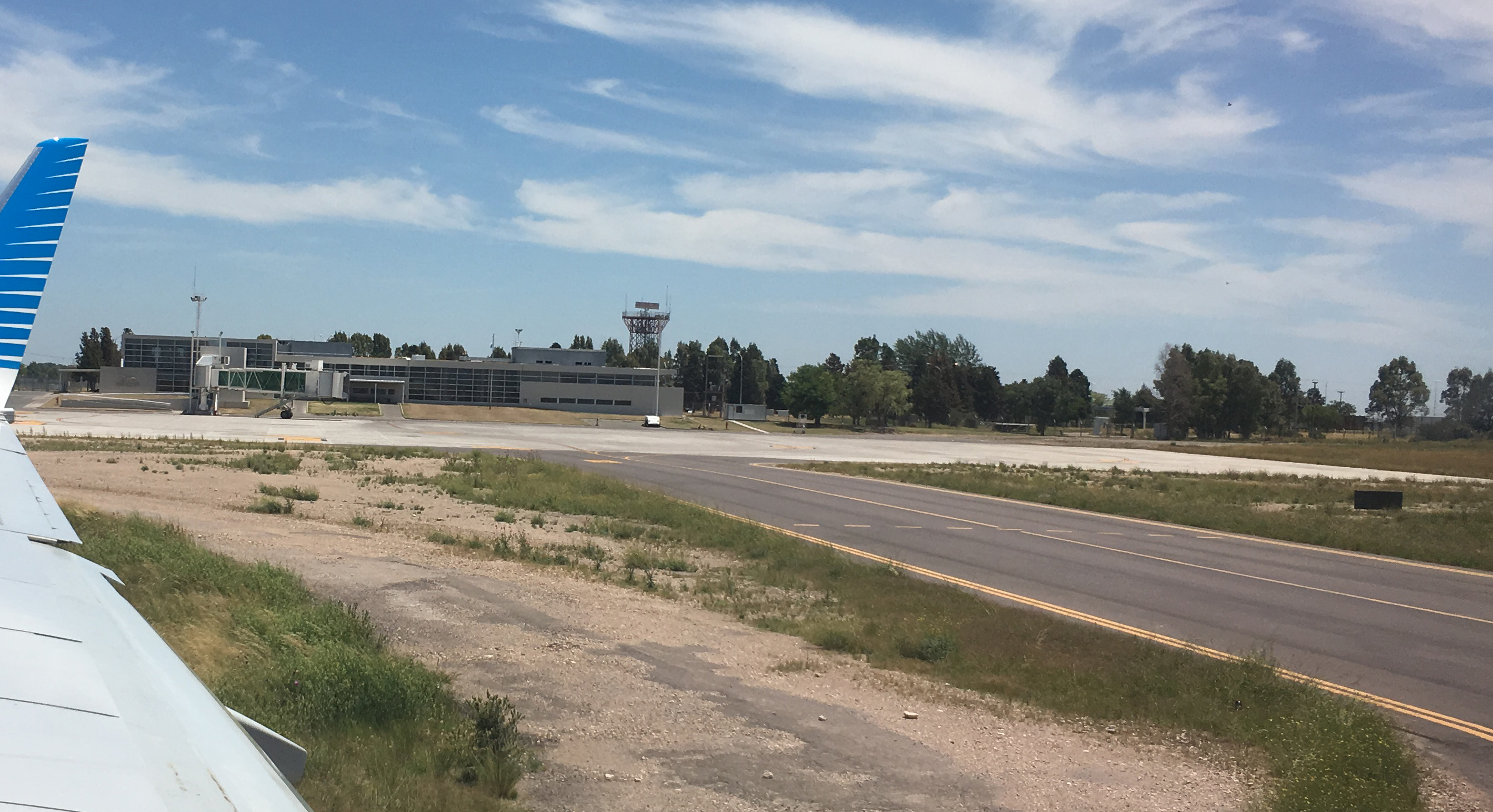
The terminal

Comandante Espora Air Naval Base was built in the 1930s to replace the old Puerto Belgrano Air Naval Base, which could not support the more modern aircraft that the Argentine Naval Aviation was adding. The new base was built in grounds close to the existing Bahía Blanca Airfield (Spanish: Aeródromo Civil de Bahía Blanca, also known as Villa Harding Green), located approximately 5 kilometers from Bahía Blanca and 25 kilometers from Puerto Belgrano Naval Base. The new airfield was opened on 16 June 1939.

Between 1945 and 1964 it was the location of the Naval Aviation School, and in 1970 the headquarters of Naval Aviation Command were relocated to Comandante Espora.

From 1968 the airport was opened to civil and commercial traffic replacing the old civil airstrip at Villa Harding Green. The installations and runway were expanded and in 1972 were released to the commercial traffic linking the Argentine South. In September 1977, the runways were extended to allow aircraft of Boeing 767 size.

== Airlines and destinations ==
Airlines	Destinations
Aerolíneas Argentinas	Buenos Aires–Aeroparque, Mar del Plata, Trelew; Seasonal: San Carlos de Bariloche
LADE	Comodoro Rivadavia, Malargüe, Mendoza, Neuquén, Puerto Madryn
