= General Enrique Mosconi International Airport =

International airport serving Comodoro Rivadavia, Chubut, Argentina

General Enrique Mosconi International Airport Aeropuerto de Comodoro Rivadavia "Gral. Enrique Mosconi"
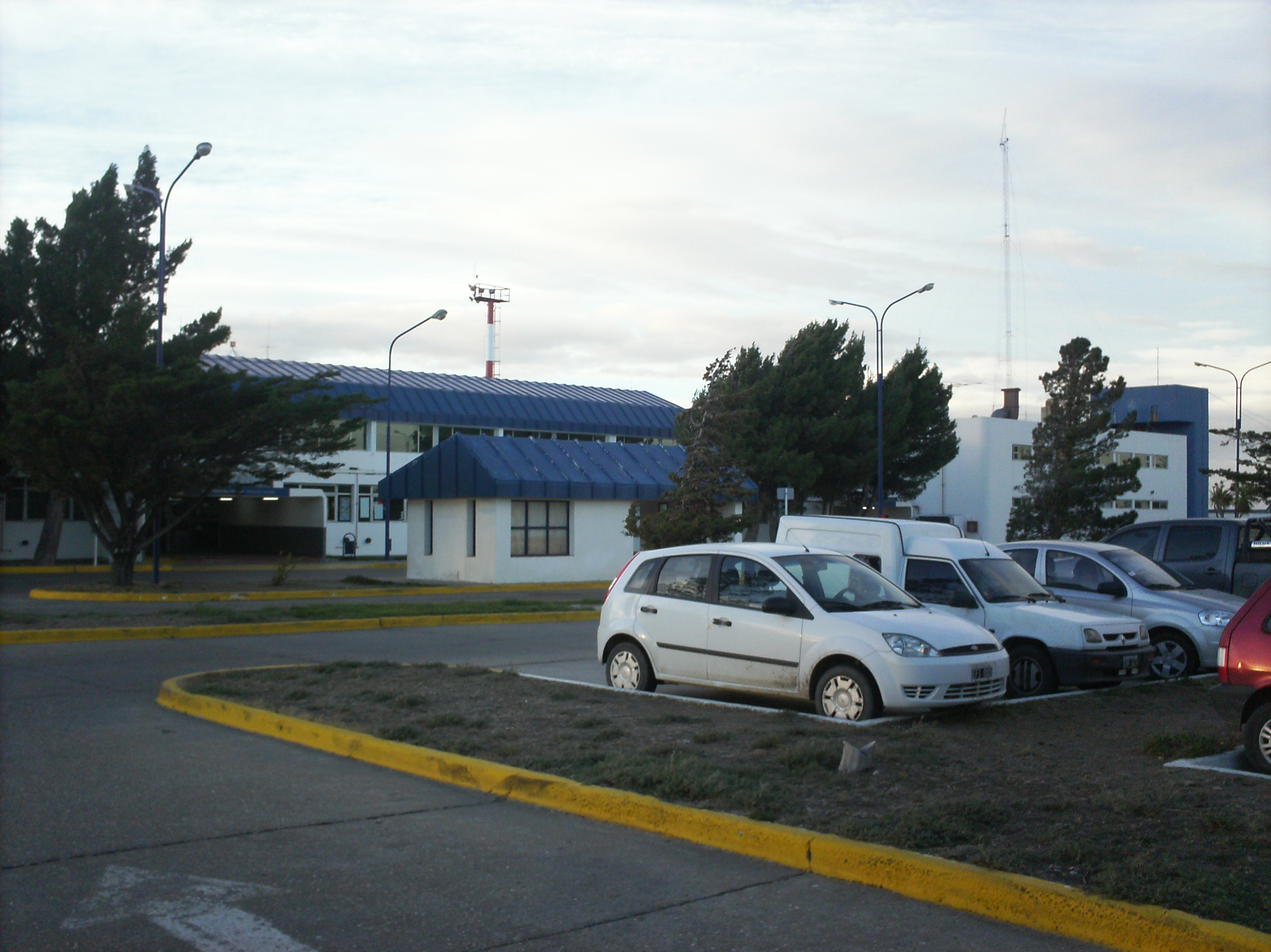
- IATA: CRD; ICAO: SAVC; WMO: 87860

Summary
- Airport type: Public/Military
- Operator: Aeropuertos Argentina 2000
- Serves: Comodoro Rivadavia, Argentina
- Hub for: LADE
- Elevation AMSL: 190 ft (58 m)
- Coordinates: 45°47′07″S 67°27′56″W
- Website: www.aeropuertosargentina.com.ar/en/CRD

Map
- Location of the airport in Argentina

Runways
Direction	Length		Surface
Direction	m	ft	Surface
07/25	2,810	9,219	Concrete

Statistics (2023)
- Passengers: 567,000
- Sources: ORSNA World Aero Data 2010 World Airport Traffic Report.

General Enrique Mosconi International Airport (Spanish: Aeropuerto Internacional General Enrigue Mosconi) (IATA: CRD, ICAO: SAVC) is an international airport in the Chubut Province, Argentina, serving Comodoro Rivadavia. The airfield is located 8 kilometres (5 mi) north of the city, covers an area of 810 hectares (2,000 acres; 3.1 sq mi), and has a 4,000-square-metre (43,000 sq ft) terminal.

The airport is the main hub of Líneas Aéreas del Estado (LADE).

It was named after Enrique Carlos Alberto Mosconi (21 February 1877 – 4 June 1940), who was a military engineer for the Armed Forces of the Argentine Republic, best known as the pioneer and organizer of petroleum surveyance and exploitation in Argentina.

== History ==
It was built in 1929, and was officially inaugurated with an Aeroposta Argentina flight between Bahía Blanca and Comodoro Rivadavia vía San Antonio Oeste and Trelew on 1 November 1929. The new terminal was constructed in 1952. The airport was named after the Argentine military engineer Enrique Mosconi.

Since the early 2000s, the airport has been operated by Aeropuertos Argentina 2000.

The airport previously served international flights to Chile, including to Balmaceda and Santiago. which was operated by Ladeco but the service was suspended by following year.

On 22 November 2017, the longest non-stop flight ever made by the Royal Air Force (RAF) of the United Kingdom landed at the airport. The flight was part of the RAF's support in the search for the ARA San Juan (S-42) submarine which had disappeared days before. This flight also marked the first time an RAF airplane had landed at the airport since the Falklands War era.

== Airlines and destinations ==
Airlines	Destinations
Aerolíneas Argentinas	Buenos Aires–Aeroparque, Córdoba (AR), Neuquén, Río Gallegos, Trelew
JetSmart Argentina	Buenos Aires–Aeroparque, Buenos Aires–Ezeiza
LADE	Bahía Blanca, El Calafate, Malargüe, Mendoza, Neuquén, Puerto Madryn, Rio Gallegos, Rio Grande, Ushuaia

== Statistics ==
Traffic by calendar year. Official ACI Statistics
	Passengers	Change from previous year	Aircraft operations	Change from previous year	Cargo (metric tons)	Change from previous year
2005	271,777	▼6.34%	8,331	▼9.85%	1,128	▲5.42%
2006	277,009	▲1.93%	7,981	▼4.20%	1,361	▲20.66%
2007	289,750	▲4.60%	8,621	▲8.02%	1,080	▼20.65%
2008	235,292	▼18.79%	8,552	▼0.80%	1,849	▲71.20%
2009	338,473	▲43.85%	9,704	▲13.47%	868	▼53.06%
2010	389,595	▲15.10%	9,779	▲0.77%	1,203	▲38.59%
Source: Airports Council International. World Airport Traffic Statistics (Years 2005-2010)

== Accidents and incidents ==
- 1956: An Argentine Army Douglas C-54A, tail number CTA-4, was damaged beyond economical repair at the airport, under unspecified circumstances. There were no reported fatalities.
- 8 April 2004: An Argentine Air Force Twin Otter, registration T-84, force-landed 10 kilometres (6.2 mi) off the airport. Despite the aircraft sustaining substantial damage, there were no reported fatalities among the six occupants.

== See also ==
- Transport in Argentina
- List of airports in Argentina
