= Comodoro D. Ricardo Salomón Airport =

Airport in Mendoza Province, Argentina

Comodoro D. Ricardo Salomón Airport Aeropuerto de Malargüe "Comodoro D. Ricardo Salomón"
- IATA: LGS; ICAO: SAMM

Summary
- Airport type: Public
- Operator: Aeropuertos Argentina 2000
- Serves: Malargüe, Argentina
- Elevation AMSL: 4,685 ft (1,428 m)
- Coordinates: 35°29′36″S 69°34′27″W

Map
- Location of airport in Argentina

Runways
Direction	Length		Surface
Direction	m	ft	Surface
14/32	2,880	9,449	Asphalt
- Source: WAD GCM SkyVector

Comodoro D. Ricardo Salomón Airport (Spanish: Aeropuerto de Malargüe "Comodoro D. Ricardo Salomón", (IATA: LGS, ICAO: SAMM)) is an airport serving Malargüe, a city in the Mendoza Province of Argentina. The airport is in the southeastern corner of the city, and is an access to Las Leñas ski resort.

The airport was built in 1947, and re-constructed in 1983. Since 1999, it has been operated by Aeropuertos Argentina 2000. It has a 1,195 square metres (12,860 sq ft) passenger terminal and parking space for 70 cars.

There is distant rising terrain to the west. Runway length includes a 235 metres (771 ft) aligned taxiway and a 470 m (1,540 ft) displaced threshold on Runway 14. The former Runway 09/27 is marked closed.

== Airlines and destinations ==
Airlines	Destinations
Aerolíneas Argentinas	Seasonal: Buenos Aires–Aeroparque
LADE	Bahía Blanca, Comodoro Rivadavia, Mendoza, Neuquén, Puerto Madryn

== See also ==
- Transport in Argentina
- List of airports in Argentina
