= Aeropuertos Argentina =

- Nickname: AA2000
- Formation: 1998
- Headquarters: Buenos Aires, Argentina
- Services: Airport infrastructure and services
- Website: www.aa2000.com.ar

Aeropuertos Argentina, commonly referred to by its former name Aeropuertos Argentina 2000, is a Buenos Aires-based consortium established in 1998 to manage and modernize Argentina's airport infrastructure through a 30-year, $2.2 billion build-operate-transfer concession. The company handles more than 41 million passengers annually and is responsible for major terminal upgrades at Ezeiza and Córdoba. It is increasingly integrating advanced AI-driven technologies to optimize passenger flow and streamline modern airport operations.

== History ==
Aeropuertos Argentina 2000 (AA2000) was established in February 1998 as a consortium by securing a 30-year contract with an option to extend it for 10 additional years which based in Buenos Aires. At its inception, the company's ownership was divided among Corporacion America Sudamericana led by Eduardo Eurnekian (35%), Ogden Corporation (28%), Societa Per Azioni Esercizi Aeroportuali (28%), Simest Spa Italy (8%), and RIVA (1%). The concession was operating under a Build–Operate–Transfer (BOT) system, with an investment commitment of $2.2 billion over the concession period and an annual license fee of $171.2 million. These funds have primarily been directed toward major upgrade projects, including the development of new passenger terminals at the Ezeiza International Airport and Córdoba Airport, as well as the expansion of the San Carlos de Bariloche Airport.

== Operation ==
In 2019, more than 41 million passengers passed through the airports operated by the company. In May 2022, Aeropuertos Argentina announced a partnership with Veovo, a company that provides airport software and technology. According to the announcement, the cloud-based software uses artificial intelligence to measure passenger movement and provide predictive and real-time insights on passenger behaviour.

== Ownership ==
The ownership divided into four corporation below:

- Corporación América S.A (45,90 %)
- Corporación América SUDAMERICANA S.A. (29,75 %)
- Department of Transportation (15 %)
- Cedicor S.A (9,35 %)

== Chairmanship ==
At a meeting held on 26 April 2017, Martín Eurnekian was appointed president of Aeropuertos Argentina, succeeding Rafael Bielsa, who stepped down after four years in the role.

== Airports ==
The airports managed by AA2000 are:

Airport	City served	Province/District	Type of airport	ICAO	IATA	FAA
Aeroparque Jorge Newbery	Buenos Aires	CABA	International	SABE	AEP	AER
Ministro Pistarini	Ezeiza	Buenos Aires	International	SAEZ	EZE	EZE
San Fernando	San Fernando	Buenos Aires	International	SADF	FDO	FDO
El Palomar	El Palomar	Buenos Aires	International	SADP	EPA	PAL
Astor Piazzolla	Mar del Plata	Buenos Aires	International	SAZM	MDQ	MDP
Coronel Felipe Varela	San Fernando del Valle de Catamarca	Catamarca	Cabotage	SANC	CTC	CAT
Resistencia	Resistencia	Chaco	International	SARE	RES	SIS
General Enrique Mosconi	Comodoro Rivadavia	Chubut	International	SAVC	CRD	CRV
Esquel Airport	Esquel	Chubut	Cabotaje	SAVE	EQS	EQS
El Tehuelche	Puerto Madryn	Chubut	Cabotaje	SAVY	PMY	PMY
Ingeniero Aeronáutico Ambrosio Taravella	Córdoba	Córdoba	International	SACO	COR	CBA
Las Higueras Airport	Río Cuarto	Córdoba	Cabotaje	SAOC	RCU	TRC
General Justo José de Urquiza	Paraná	Entre Ríos	Cabotaje	SAAP	PRA	PAR
Formosa	Formosa	Formosa	International	SARF	FMA	FSA
Governor Horacio Guzmán	San Salvador de Jujuy	Jujuy	International	SASJ	JUJ	JUJ
General Pico	General Pico	La Pampa	Cabotaje	SAZG	GPO	GPI
Santa Rosa	Santa Rosa	La Pampa	Cabotaje	SAZR	RSA	OSA
Captain Vicente Almandos Almonacid	La Rioja	La Rioja	Cabotaje	SANL	IRJ	LAR
Commodore Ricardo Salomón	Malargüe	Mendoza	International	SAMM	LGS	MLG
Governor Francisco Gabrielli	Mendoza	Mendoza	International	SAME	MDZ	DOZ
San Rafael	San Rafael	Mendoza	Cabotaje	SAMR	AFA	SRA
Cataratas del Iguazú	Puerto Iguazú	Misiones	International	SARI	IGR	IGU
Libertador General José de San Martín	Posadas	Misiones	International	SARP	PSS	POS
San Carlos de Bariloche	San Carlos de Bariloche	Río Negro	International	SAZS	BRC	BAR
Gobernador Edgardo Castello	Viedma	Río Negro	Cabotaje	SAVV	VDM	VIE
Martín Miguel de Güemes	Salta	Salta	International	SASA	SLA	SAL
Domingo Faustino Sarmiento	San Juan	San Juan	Cabotaje	SANU	UAQ	JUA
Brigadier Mayor César Raúl Ojeda	San Luis	San Luis	Cabotaje	SAOU	LUQ	UIS
Villa Reynolds	Villa Mercedes	San Luis	Cabotaje	SAOR	VME	RYD
Piloto Civil Norberto Fernández	Río Gallegos	Santa Cruz	International	SAWG	RGL	GAL
Reconquista	Reconquista	Santa Fe	Cabotaje	SATR	RCQ	RTA
Vicecomodoro Ángel de la Paz Aragonés	Santiago del Estero	Santiago del Estero	Cabotaje	SANE	SDE	SDE
Termas de Río Hondo	Termas de Río Hondo	Santiago del Estero	International	SANR	RHD	MRA
Hermes Quijada	Río Grande	Tierra del Fuego	International	SAWE	RGA	GRA
Teniente Benjamín Matienzo	San Miguel de Tucumán	Tucumán	International	SANT	TUC	TUC

== See also ==
- Transport in Argentina
- List of airports in Argentina
