= Eduardo Eurnekian =

Argentine billionaire businessman

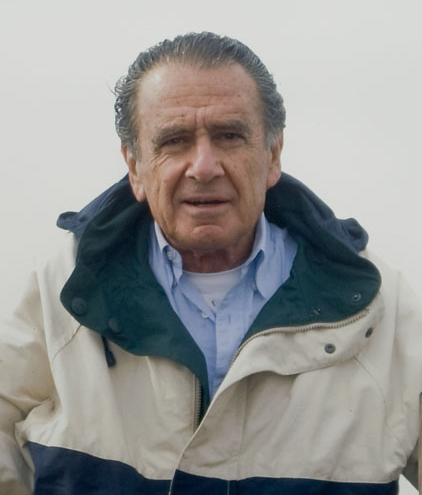
- Born: 4 December 1932 (age 93); Buenos Aires, Argentina
- Occupation: Businessman
- Known for: Founder of Corporación América; Aeropuertos Argentina 2000; Former owner of Cablevisión
- Awards: National Hero of Armenia (2017); Oslo Business for Peace Award (2012); Honorary OBE (2020)

Eduardo Eurnekian (Note: Western Armenian: Էտուարտօ Էռնէկեան; Eastern Armenian: Էդուարդո Էռնեկյան.) (born 4 December 1932) is an Argentine billionaire businessman of Armenian heritage. As of 2024, he is Argentina’s fourth-richest person, with a net worth of $3.4 billion.

== Early life ==
Eurnekian was born in Argentina to Armenian immigrant parents. His family ran a textile business that thrived for years and supplied Puma. However, in 1981, the company nearly collapsed due to Argentina’s economic deregulation under Minister José Alfredo Martínez de Hoz.

== Career ==
The Eurnekian family reportedly borrowed heavily from the former Argentine small business lender, BANADE, and in 1988, Eduardo Eurnekian purchased ‘Cablevisión S.A,’ then a failing local cable TV station. His investment became increasingly lucrative following Economy Minister Domingo Cavallo’s implementation of the Convertibility Plan in 1991, which brought financial and price stability to Argentina during the 1990s. In 1994 he sold a 51% stake in Cablevision S.A. (by then Argentina's second-largest cable operator), to Tele-Communications Inc. for US$350 million and in 1997, netted US$320 million by selling most of his remaining shares to local investment giant CEI Citicorp Holdings SA.

Eurnekian also held controlling interest in "América TV", four radio stations and a Buenos Aires financial daily, El Cronista. "Aeropuertos Argentina 2000," a consortium led by Eurnekian won a 30-year concession in 1998 to run 33 of the Argentina's main airports. He also bought the Howard Johnson's master franchise in Argentina from Cendant, and invested in a regional airline company, LAPA.

== Investments in Armenia ==
In 2001, Eurnekian’s company, Corporación América, signed a 30-year contract to manage Armenia’s Zvartnots International Airport. It later built a new terminal to meet international standards, a project costing over $50 million.

Eurnekian unveiled plans to invest millions of dollars into Armenia's agribusiness sector as he set up a joint venture with a local firm. Senior executives from Tierras de Armenia, a Yerevan-based company belonging to Eurnekian, and the Max Group (owned by Harutiun Pambukian, a parliamentarian close to former President Robert Kocharian), reported a US$25 million joint venture to develop 60 km^{2} (24 mi^{2}) of arid land in the southern Armavir region into fruit orchards and a fruit processing plant.

Eurnekian has built an almost $1 billion media empire since the early 1990s and is now the majority owner of a consortium operating 76 airports worldwide, mostly across Argentina and elsewhere in South America as well as in Armenia. He also owns 2,000 square kilometres of land and food processing factories in northern Argentina.

== Awards ==
Eurnekian has received multiple awards, including Businessman of the Year (1995), Italy’s Leonardo Award (1999), and Armenia’s highest honors. He was named National Hero of Armenia in 2017 and received the Oslo Business for Peace Award in 2012. In 2020, he was appointed an Honorary Officer of the Order of the British Empire (OBE) for contributions to UK-Argentina relations.

On 4 February 2023 the Mayor of the city of Florence, Dario Nardella, has handed over the keys to the city to Eurnekian. “His Argentine and Armenian descent and the fact that he created the Raoul Wallenberg Foundation (…) is a very important symbol for us,” the Mayor said.

== Personal life ==
Eurnekian is single, and his "chosen successor" is his nephew Martin Eurnekian.

== See also ==
- Zvartnots International Airport
- Shirak International Airport
- Corporación América
