= San Fernando Airport (Argentina) =

Airport in Argentina

San Fernando International Airport Aeropuerto Internacional de San Fernando
- IATA: QAE; ICAO: SADF

Summary
- Airport type: Public
- Operator: Aeropuertos Argentina 2000 S.A.
- Serves: San Fernando, Argentina
- Elevation AMSL: 10 ft (3.0 m)
- Coordinates: 34°27′10″S 58°35′20″W
- Website: aa2000.com.ar/eng/home/index.php

Map
- Location of airport in Argentina

Runways
Direction	Length		Surface
Direction	m	ft	Surface
05/23	1,800	5,906	Asphalt

Statistics (2010)
- Passengers: 30,542
- Passenger change 09–10: ▲64.4%
- Aircraft movements: 65,139
- Movements change 09–10: ▼6.1%
- Sources: AIP ORSNA, WAD

San Fernando International Airport (Spanish: Aeropuerto Internacional de San Fernando) (IATA: QAE, ICAO: SADF) is located 2 km (1.2 mi) southwest of the center of San Fernando, a northwest suburb of Buenos Aires in Argentina. The airport is operated by Aeropuertos Argentina 2000.

== Statistics ==
Traffic by calendar year. Official ACI Statistics
	Passengers	Change from previous year	Aircraft operations	Change from previous year	Cargo (metric tons)	Change from previous year
2005	14,304	▼5.73%	47,329	▲20.19%	N.A.	N.A.
2006	17,810	▲24.51%	62,097	▲31.20%	N.A.	N.A.
2007	20,553	▲15.40%	70,715	▲13.88%	N.A.	N.A.
2008	21,265	▲3.46%	73,673	▲4.18%	N.A.	N.A.
2009	18,577	▼12.64%	69,365	▼5.85%	N.A.	N.A.
2010	30,542	▲64.41%	65,139	▼6.09%	N.A.	N.A.
Source: Airports Council International. World Airport Traffic Statistics (Years 2005-2010)

== Accidents and incidents ==
On 18 December 2024, a Bombardier Challenger 300 overran the runway while attempting to land at the airport. The plane hit the front of a house bordering the airport. Both pilots were killed, but nobody was killed or hurt on the ground.

== See also ==
- Transport in Argentina
- List of airports in Argentina
