= Resistencia International Airport =

Resistencia International Airport Aeropuerto Internacional de Resistencia
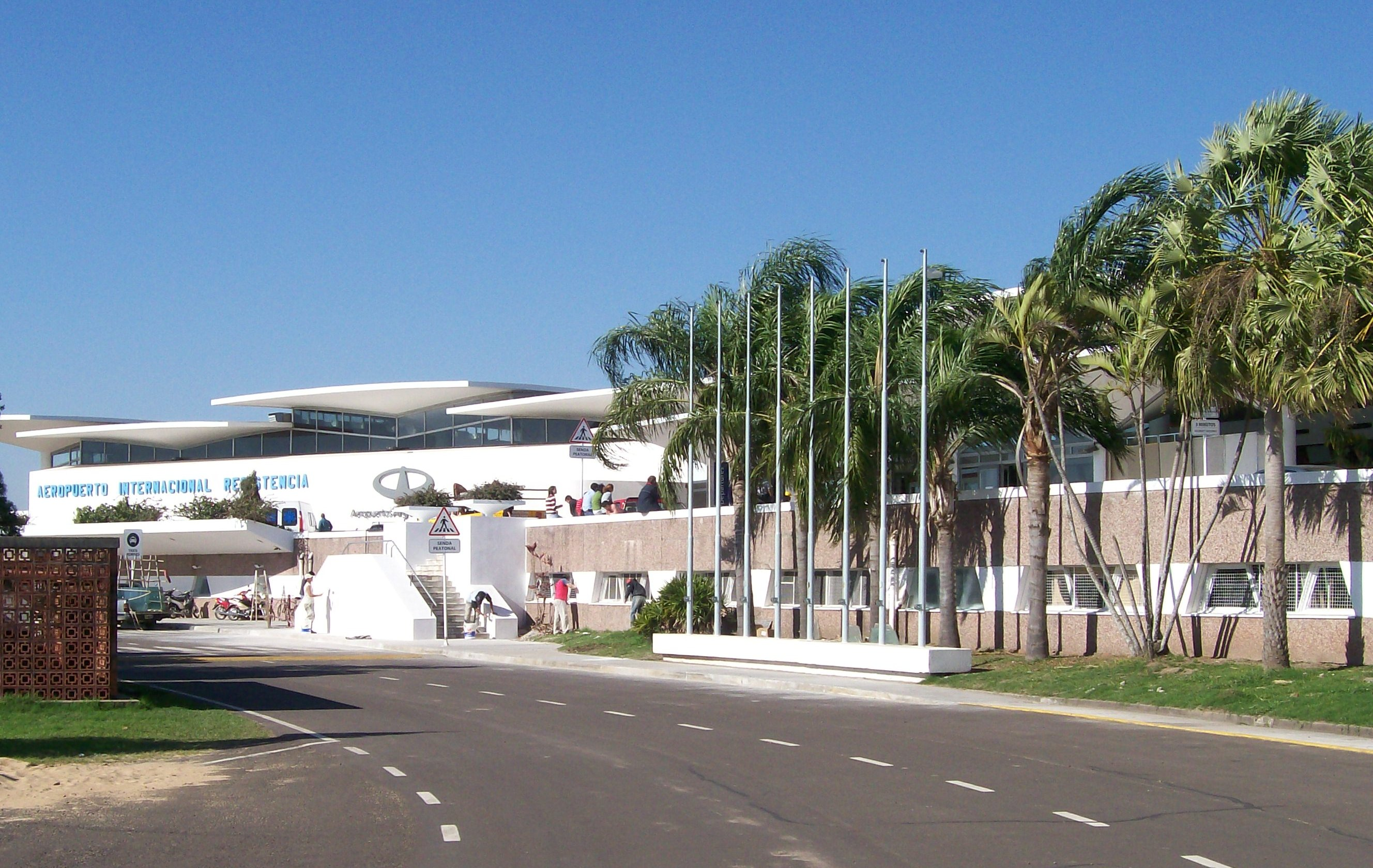
- IATA: RES; ICAO: SARE; WMO: 87155

Summary
- Airport type: Public
- Operator: Aeropuertos Argentina 2000
- Serves: Resistencia, Argentina
- Elevation AMSL: 170 ft (52 m)
- Coordinates: 27°27′00″S 59°03′22″W
- Website: www.aeropuertosargentina.com/en/RES

Map
- Location of airport in Argentina

Runways
Direction	Length		Surface
Direction	m	ft	Surface
03/21	2,770	9,088	Asphalt

Statistics (2016)
- Passengers: 219,125
- Passenger change 15–16: ▼16.5%
- Aircraft movements: 3,685
- Movements change 15–16: ▼18.6%
- Source: WAD GCM Google Maps

Resistencia International Airport (Spanish: Aeropuerto Internacional de Resistencia, IATA: RES, ICAO: SARE) is an airport in Chaco Province, Argentina serving the city of Resistencia. It is also known as Aeropuerto de Resistencia General José de San Martín. The airport is operated by Aeropuertos Argentina 2000.

Corrientes airport is 28 kilometres (17 mi) to the east.

Despite being classified as an international airport, it only serves domestic flights. Previously, it also served international flights to Paraguay and Chile.

== Facilities ==
The airport was built in 1965, and the 6,500 square metres (70,000 sq ft) passenger terminal was completed in 1971. It has a 3.5 hectares (8.6 acres) apron that can support Boeing 777-size aircraft. Parking is available for 150 cars.

== Airlines and destinations ==
Airlines	Destinations
Aerolíneas Argentinas	Buenos Aires–Aeroparque, Córdoba (AR), Salta; Seasonal: Puerto Iguazu
JetSmart Argentina	Buenos Aires–Aeroparque

== Statistics ==
Traffic by calendar year. Official ACI Statistics
	Passengers	Change from previous year	Aircraft operations	Change from previous year	Cargo (metric tons)	Change from previous year
2005	113,092	▼13.57%	3,550	▼0.31%	587	▲40.43%
2006	103,784	▼8.23%	3,600	▲1.41%	594	▲1.19%
2007	99,169	▼4.45%	2,957	▼17.86%	424	▼28.62%
2008	84,936	▼14.35%	3,088	▲4.43%	411	▼3.07%
2009	158,629	▲86.76%	4,069	▲31.71%	491	▲19.46%
2010	125,905	▼20.63%	3,437	▼15.53%	326	▼33.60%
Source: Airports Council International. World Airport Traffic Statistics (Years 2005-2010)

== See also ==
- Transport in Argentina
- List of airports in Argentina
