= San Rafael Airport (Argentina) =

San Rafael Airport Aeropuerto San Rafael "Santiago Germano"
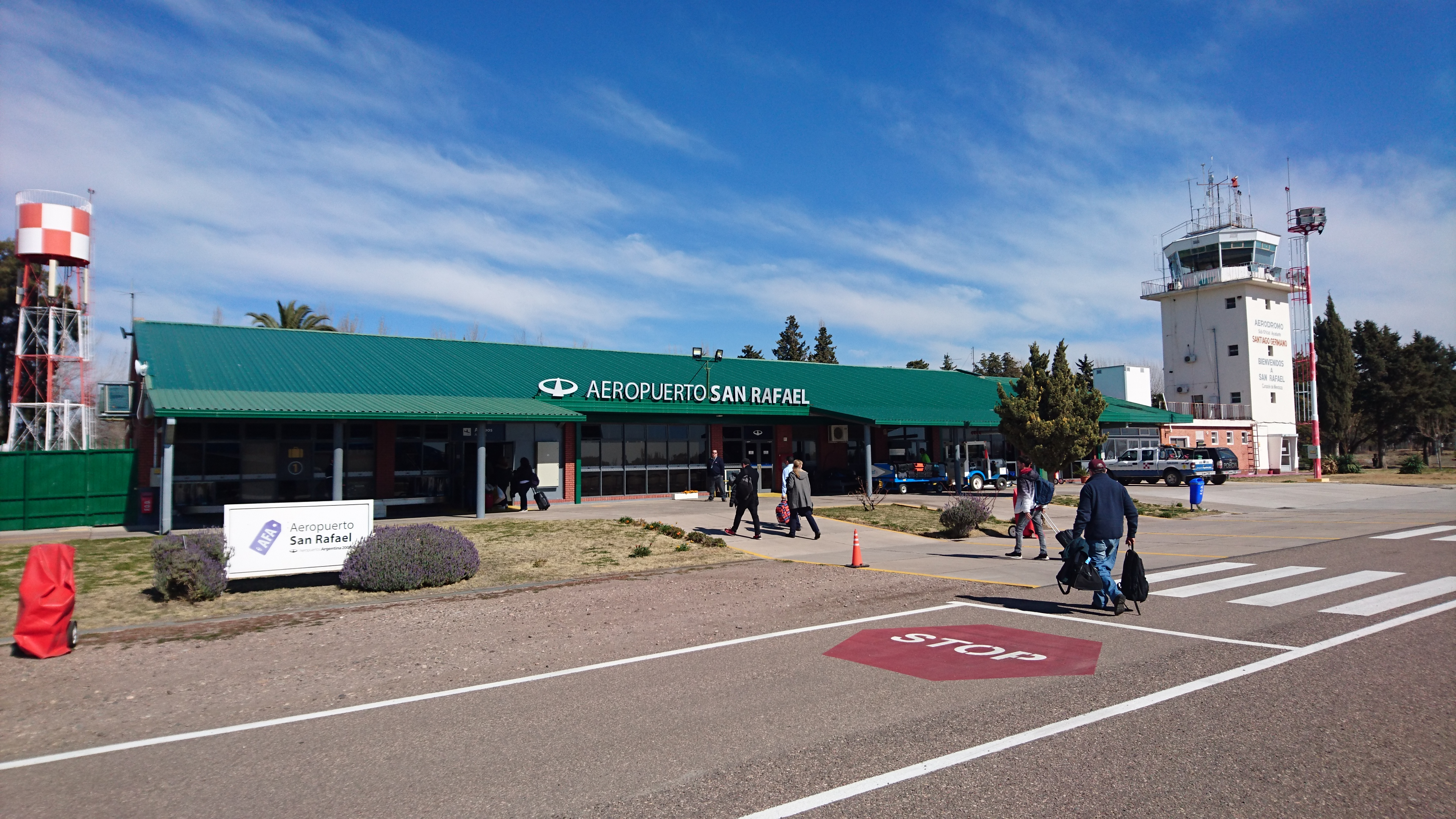
- IATA: AFA; ICAO: SAMR

Summary
- Airport type: Public
- Operator: Aeropuertos Argentina 2000
- Serves: San Rafael, Argentina
- Elevation AMSL: 2,470 ft (750 m)
- Coordinates: 34°35′17″S 68°24′10″W

Map
- Location of airport in Argentina

Runways
Direction	Length		Surface
Direction	m	ft	Surface
11/29	2,355	7,726	Asphalt

Statistics (2016)
- Total passengers: 60,800
- Source: WAD GCM Google Maps

San Rafael Airport (IATA: AFA, ICAO: SAMR) is a public airport located 6 kilometres (4 mi) west of San Rafael, a city in the Mendoza Province of Argentina. It is also known as Suboficial Ayudante Santiago Germano Airport.

Runway length includes displaced thresholds of 100 metres (330 ft) on Runway 11 and 155 metres (509 ft) on Runway 29. The San Rafael VOR (Ident: SRA) is located on the field.

== Airlines and destinations ==
Airlines	Destinations
Aerolíneas Argentinas	Buenos Aires–Aeroparque

== See also ==
- Transport in Argentina
- List of airports in Argentina
