= Hermes Quijada International Airport =

Airport in Argentina

Hermes Quijada International Airport Aeropuerto Internacional de Río Grande
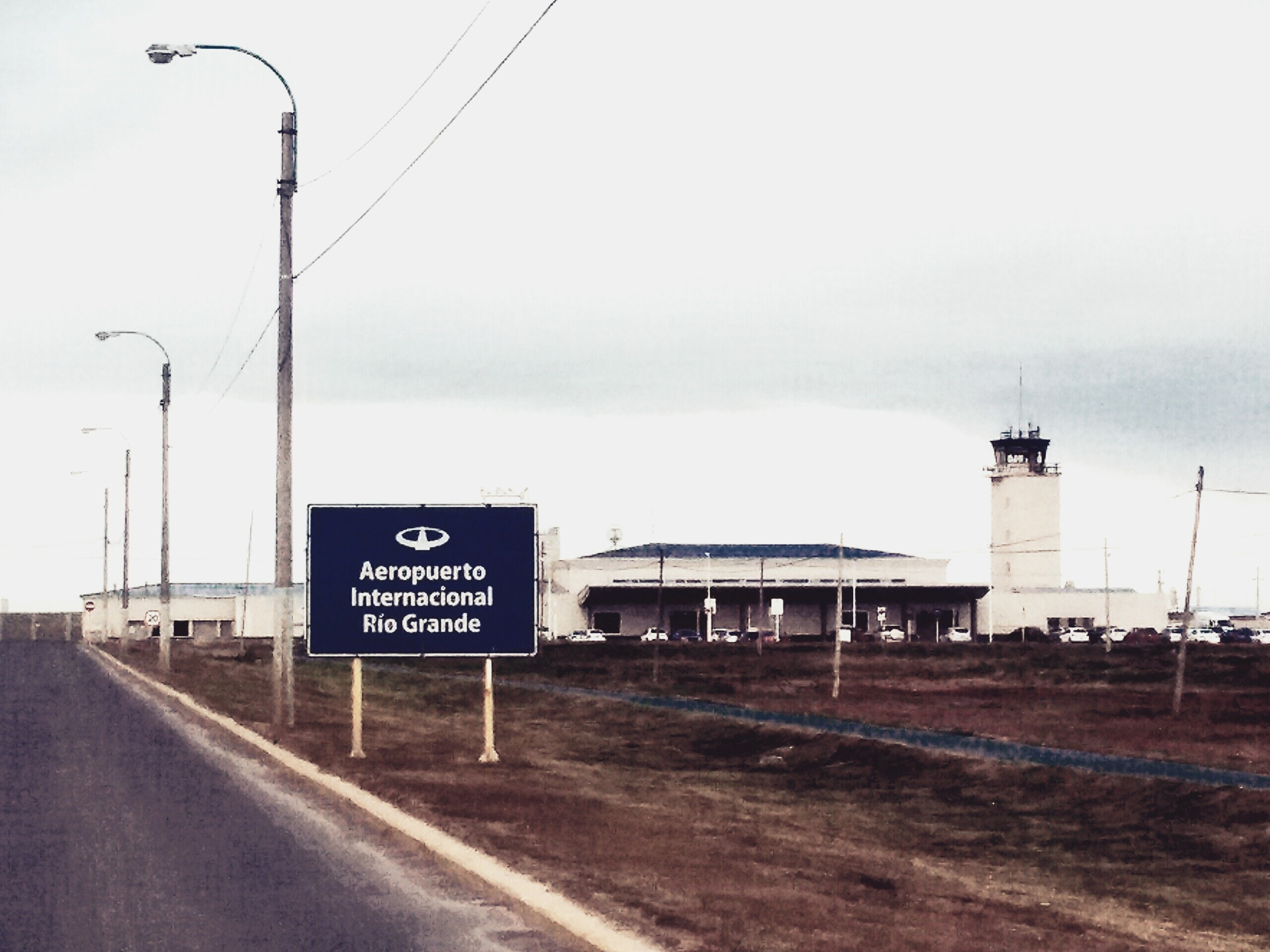
- IATA: RGA; ICAO: SAWE

Summary
- Airport type: Public / military
- Operator: Aeropuertos Argentina 2000
- Serves: Río Grande, Tierra del Fuego, Argentina
- Elevation AMSL: 65 ft (20 m)
- Coordinates: 53°46′40″S 67°45′15″W

Map
- Location of airport in Tierra del Fuego

Runways
Direction	Length		Surface
Direction	m	ft	Surface
08/26	2,000	6,562	Asphalt

Statistics (2019)
- Total passengers: 150,849
- Source: GCM SkyVector

Hermes Quijada International Airport (Spanish: Aeropuerto International de Río Grande - Hermes Quijada) (IATA: RGA, ICAO: SAWE) is an airport in Tierra del Fuego Province, Argentina serving the city of Río Grande. It is operated by Aeropuertos Argentina 2000.

== Airlines and destinations ==
=== Passenger ===
Airlines	Destinations
Aerolíneas Argentinas	Buenos Aires–Aeroparque
LADE	Comodoro Rivadavia, El Calafate, Río Gallegos, Ushuaia

=== Cargo ===
Airlines	Destinations
Aerolíneas Argentinas Cargo	Buenos Aires–Ezeiza

== Statistics ==
Traffic by calendar year, official ACI statistics
	Passengers	Change from previous year	Aircraft operations	Change from previous year	Cargo (metric tons)	Change from previous year
2005	98,828	▼6.37%	4,114	▼35.88%	1,033	▲5.73%
2006	103,560	▲4.79%	3,359	▼18.35%	1,283	▲24.20%
2007	100,973	▼2.50%	3,898	▲16.05%	910	▼29.07%
2008	78,455	▼22.30%	3,423	▼12.19%	288	▼68.35%
2009	89,789	▲14.45%	4,112	▲20.13%	175	▼39.24%
2010	99,017	▲10.28%	4,563	▲10.97%	580	▲231.43%
Source: Airports Council International. World Airport Traffic Statistics (Years 2005-2010)

== See also ==
- Transport in Argentina
- List of airports in Argentina
