= General Justo José de Urquiza Airport =

Airport in Paraná, Argentina

General Justo José de Urquiza Airport Aeropuerto de Entre Ríos "General Justo José de Urquiza"
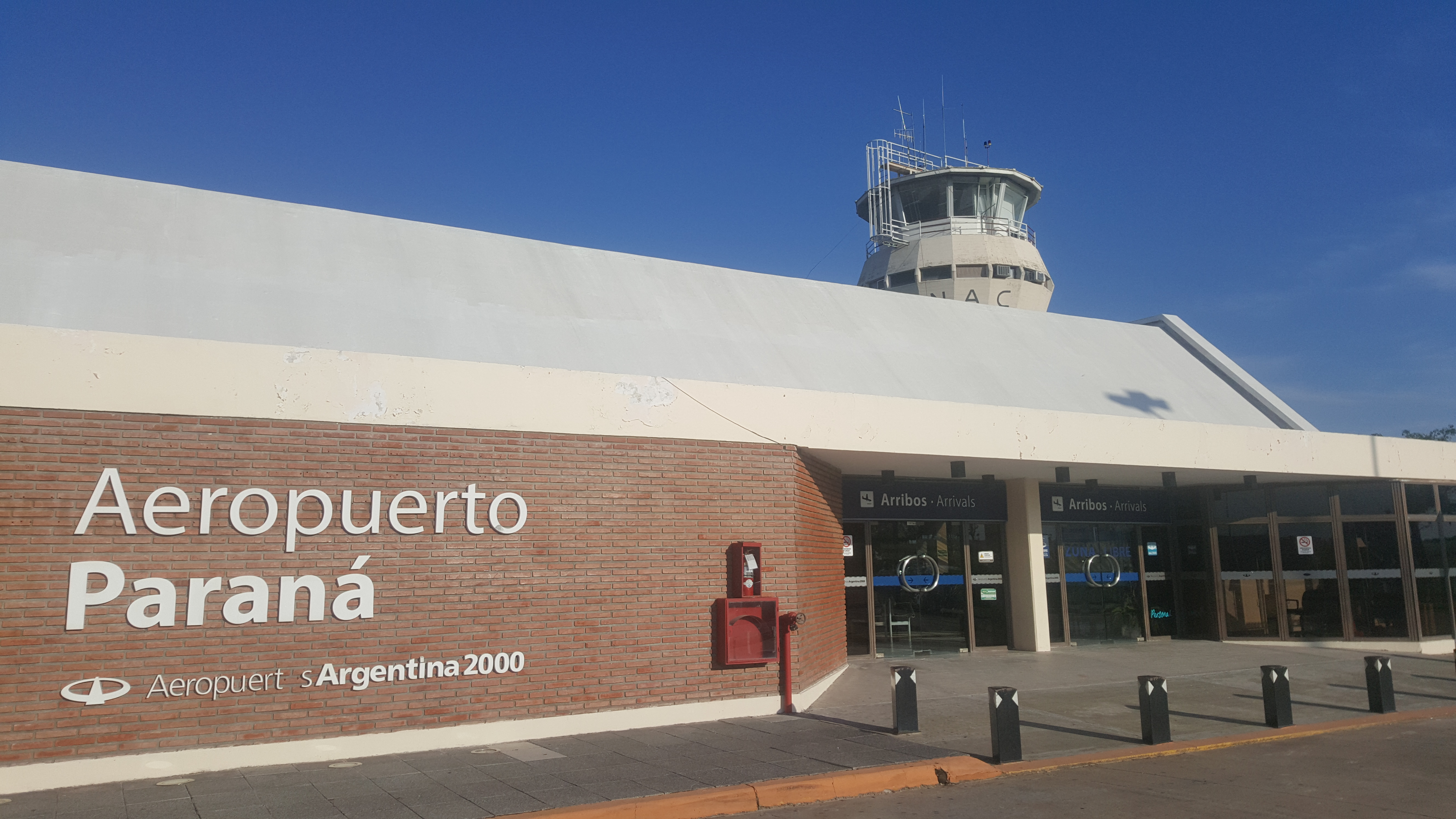
- IATA: PRA; ICAO: SAAP

Summary
- Airport type: Public / Military
- Operator: Aeropuertos Argentina 2000
- Location: Paraná, Argentina
- Elevation AMSL: 243 ft (74 m)
- Coordinates: 31°47′40″S 60°28′49″W

Map
- Location of airport in Argentina

Runways
Direction	Length		Surface
Direction	m	ft	Surface
02/20	2,100	6,890	Asphalt

Statistics (2016)
- Passengers: 43,307
- Passenger change 15–16: ▲11.8%
- Aircraft movements: 2,667
- Movements change 15-16: ▲4.17%
- Sources: ORSNA WAD GCM

General Justo José de Urquiza Airport (Spanish: Aeropuerto de Entre Ríos "General Justo José de Urquiza") (IATA: PRA, ICAO: SAAP) is located on the southeast side of Paraná, a city in the Entre Ríos Province of Argentina. The airport covers an area of 425 hectares (1,050 acres) and is operated by Aeropuertos Argentina 2000. The airport is named for Justo José de Urquiza, president of the Argentine Confederation from 1854 to 1860.

The Argentine Air Force Second Air Brigade, Paraná is based on the north side of the airport, while the public terminal facilities are on the west side.

== Airlines and destinations ==
Airlines	Destinations
Aerolíneas Argentinas	Buenos Aires–Aeroparque
Humming Airways	Buenos Aires–Aeroparque

== Statistics ==
Traffic by calendar year. Official ACI Statistics
	Passengers	Change from previous year	Aircraft operations	Change from previous year	Cargo (metric tons)	Change from previous year
2005	3,955	▼68.56%	3,940	▲2.36%	4	▲100.00%
2006	6,208	▲56.97%	3,560	▼9.64%	13	▲225.00%
2007	4,152	▼33.12%	3,120	▼12.36%	2	▼84.62%
2008	12,647	▲204.60%	4,766	▲52.76%	20	▲900.00%
2009	10,754	▼14.97%	4,053	▼14.96%	17	▼15.00%
2010	9,117	▼15.22%	4,771	▲17.72%	N.A.	N.A.
Source: Airports Council International. World Airport Traffic Statistics (Years 2005-2010)

== See also ==
- Transport in Argentina
- List of airports in Argentina
