= Cataratas del Iguazú International Airport =

Airport in Misiones Province, Argentina

Cataratas del Iguazú International Airport Aeropuerto Internacional de Puerto Iguazú
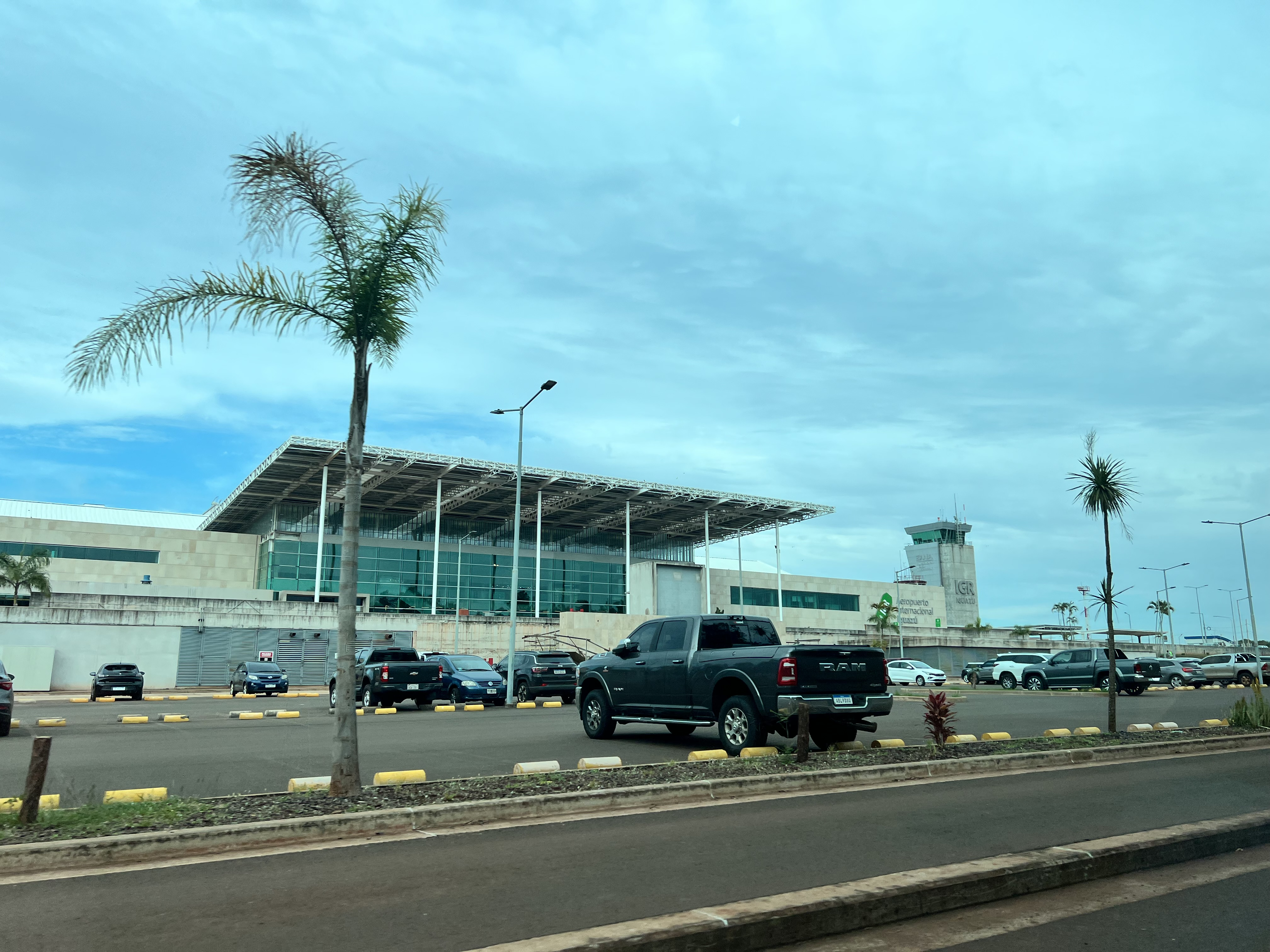
- IATA: IGR; ICAO: SARI

Summary
- Airport type: Public
- Operator: Aeropuertos Argentina 2000
- Serves: Puerto Iguazú, Argentina
- Elevation AMSL: 916 ft (279 m)
- Coordinates: 25°44′10″S 54°28′25″W
- Website: www.aa2000.com.ar/iguazu

Map
- Location of airport in Argentina

Runways
Direction	Length		Surface
Direction	m	ft	Surface
13/31	3,300	10,827	Asphalt

Statistics (2021)
- Total passengers: 401,000
- Sources: AIP ORSNA WAD GCM

Cataratas del Iguazú International Airport (Spanish: Aeropuerto Internacional Cataratas del Iguazú) (IATA: IGR, ICAO: SARI), also known as Mayor Carlos Eduardo Krause Airport, is an airport in Misiones Province, Argentina, serving the city of Puerto Iguazú and providing access to the nearby Iguazú Falls (Spanish: Cataratas del Iguazú). It is the easternmost Argentine airport served by scheduled flights. The airport covers an area of 1,804 ha (4,460 acres) and is operated by Aeropuertos Argentina 2000.

The airport is in forested countryside 16 kilometres (10 mi) southeast of Puerto Iguazú, and 6 kilometres (4 mi) south of the falls.

== Airlines and destinations ==
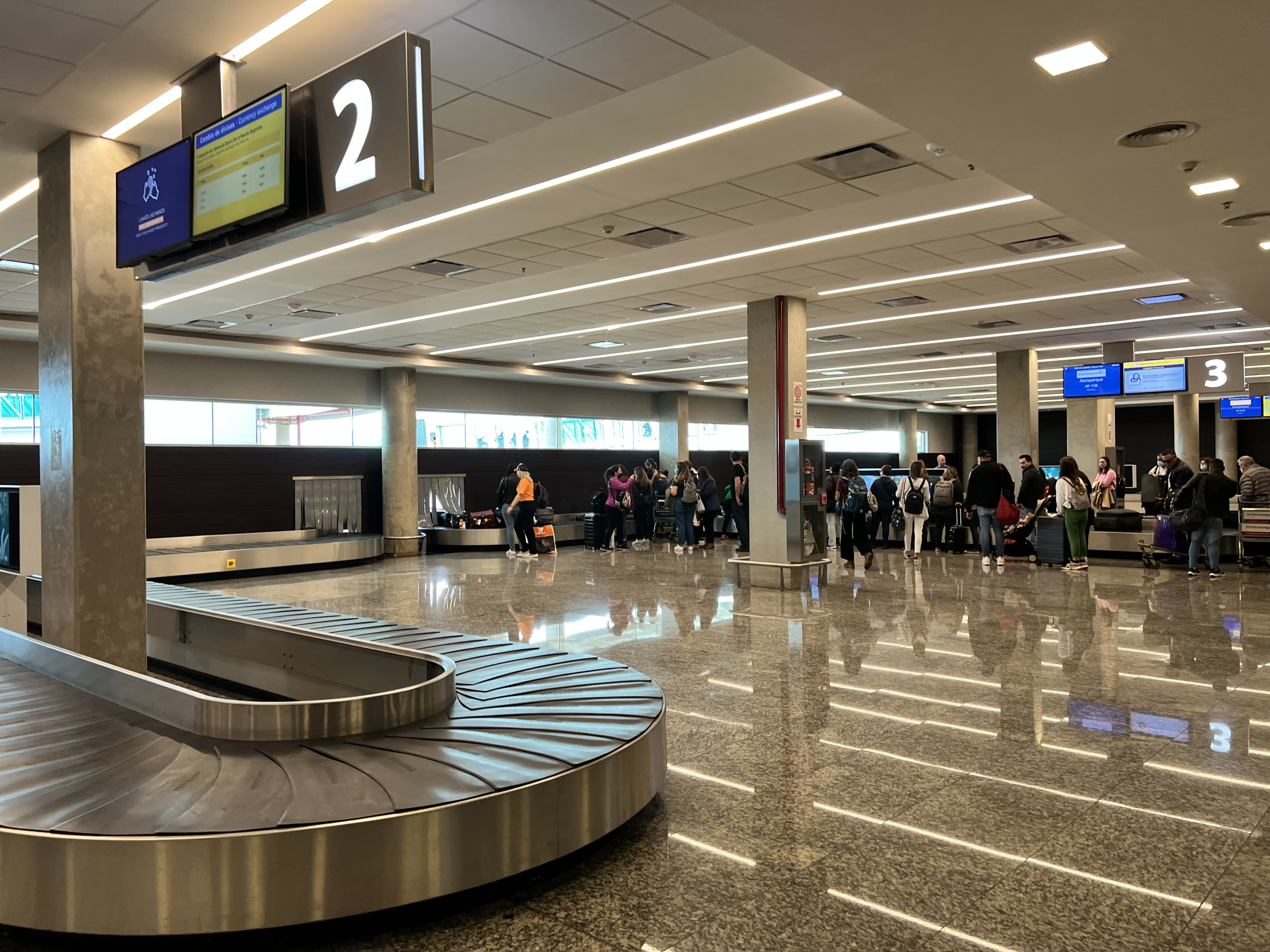
Baggage claim area

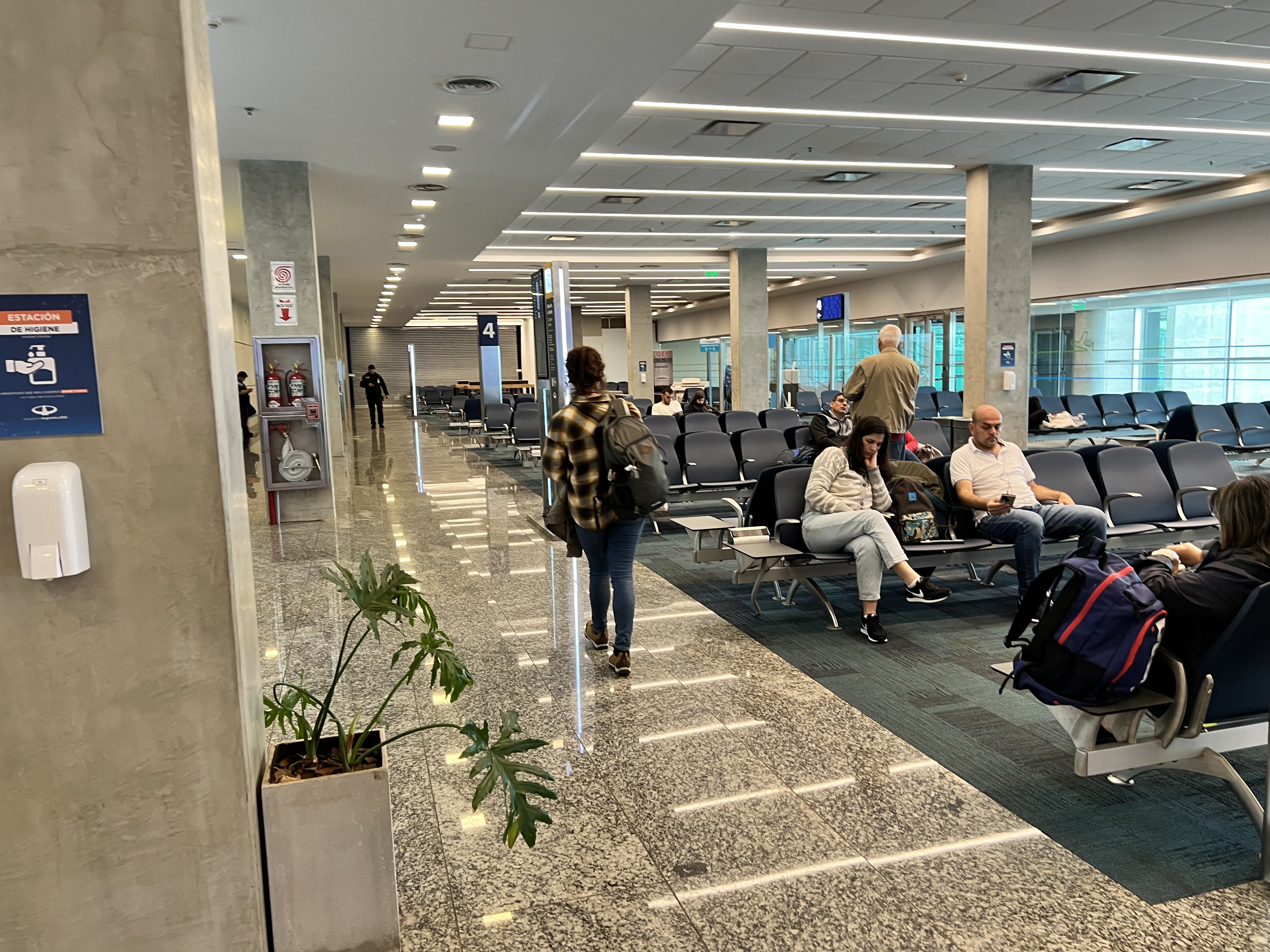
Last waiting gates at the airport

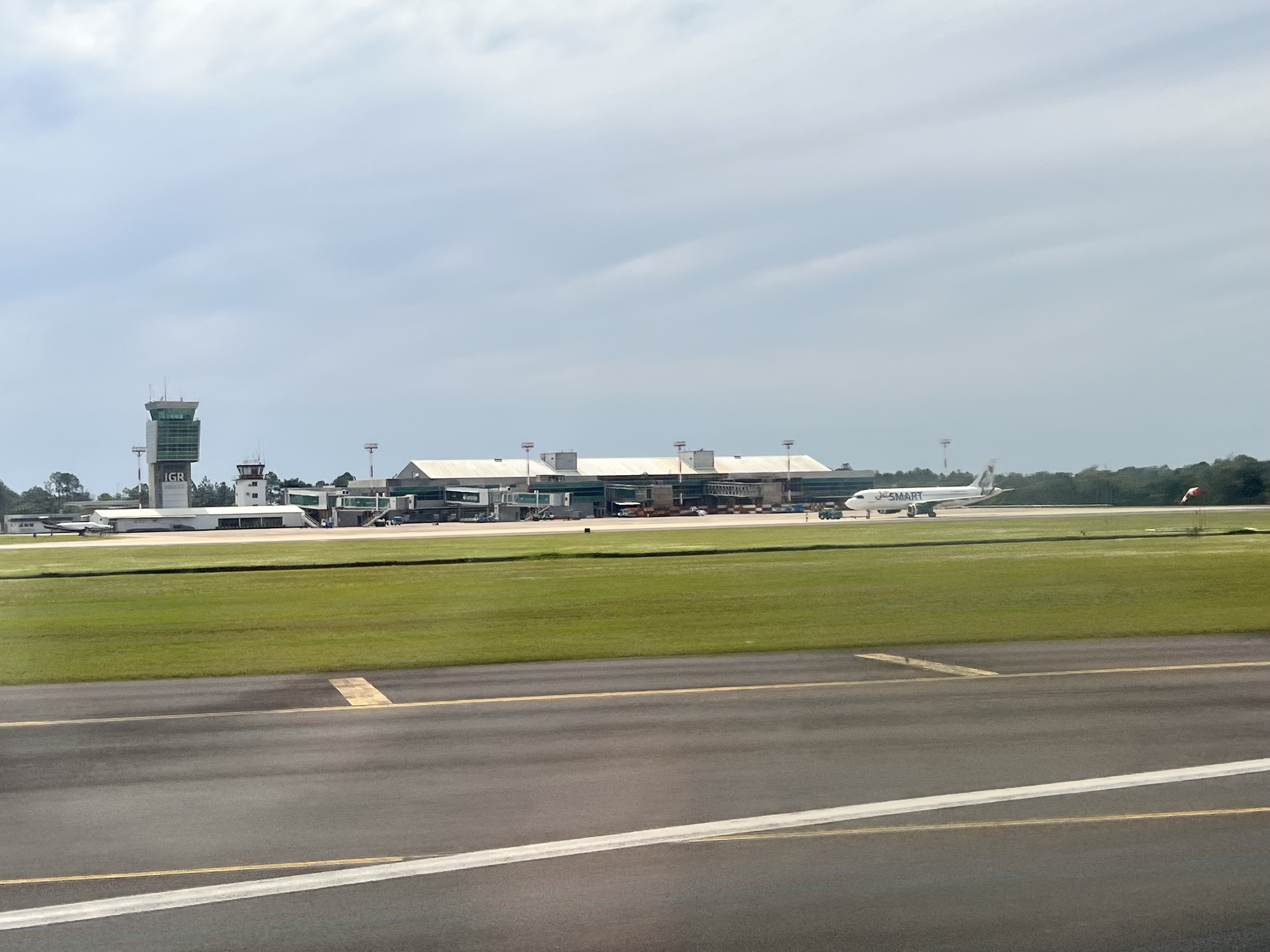
Airside of the airport

Airlines	Destinations
Aerolíneas Argentinas	Buenos Aires–Aeroparque, Buenos Aires–Ezeiza, Córdoba (AR), Rosario, Salta, San Salvador de Jujuy, Tucumán; Seasonal: Resistencia
JetSmart Argentina	Buenos Aires–Aeroparque, Buenos Aires–Ezeiza

== Statistics ==
Traffic by calendar year - official ACI statistics
	Passengers	Change from previous year	Aircraft operations	Change from previous year	Cargo (metric tons)	Change from previous year
2005	489,100	▲10.74%	5,779	▲8.28%	173	▼10.82%
2006	490,083	▲0.20%	5,913	▲2.32%	198	▲14.45%
2007	569,497	▲16.20%	6,005	▲1.56%	234	▲18.18%
2008	606,876	▲6.56%	6,637	▲10.52%	314	▲34.19%
2009	568,764	▼6.28%	6,275	▼5.45%	226	▼28.03%
2010	620,755	▲9.14%	6,788	▲8.18%	200	▼11.50%
Source: Airports Council International. World Airport Traffic Statistics (Years 2005–2010)

Traffic by calendar year - official EANA statistics
	Passengers	Change from previous year	Aircraft operations	Change from previous year	Cargo (metric tons)	Change from previous year
2015	861,000	▲	_	▲	_	▲
2016	890,000	▲	_	▲	_	▲
2017	999,000	▲	_	▲	_	▲
2018	1,089,000	▲	_	▲	_	▲
2019	1,566,035	▲	_	▲	_	▲
2020	355,000	▼	_	▲	_	▲
2021	401,000	▲	_	▲	_	▲
EANA

== See also ==
- Transport in Argentina
- List of airports in Argentina
