= Presidente Perón International Airport =

Presidente Perón Internacional Airport Aeropuerto Internacional de Neuquén – Presidente Perón
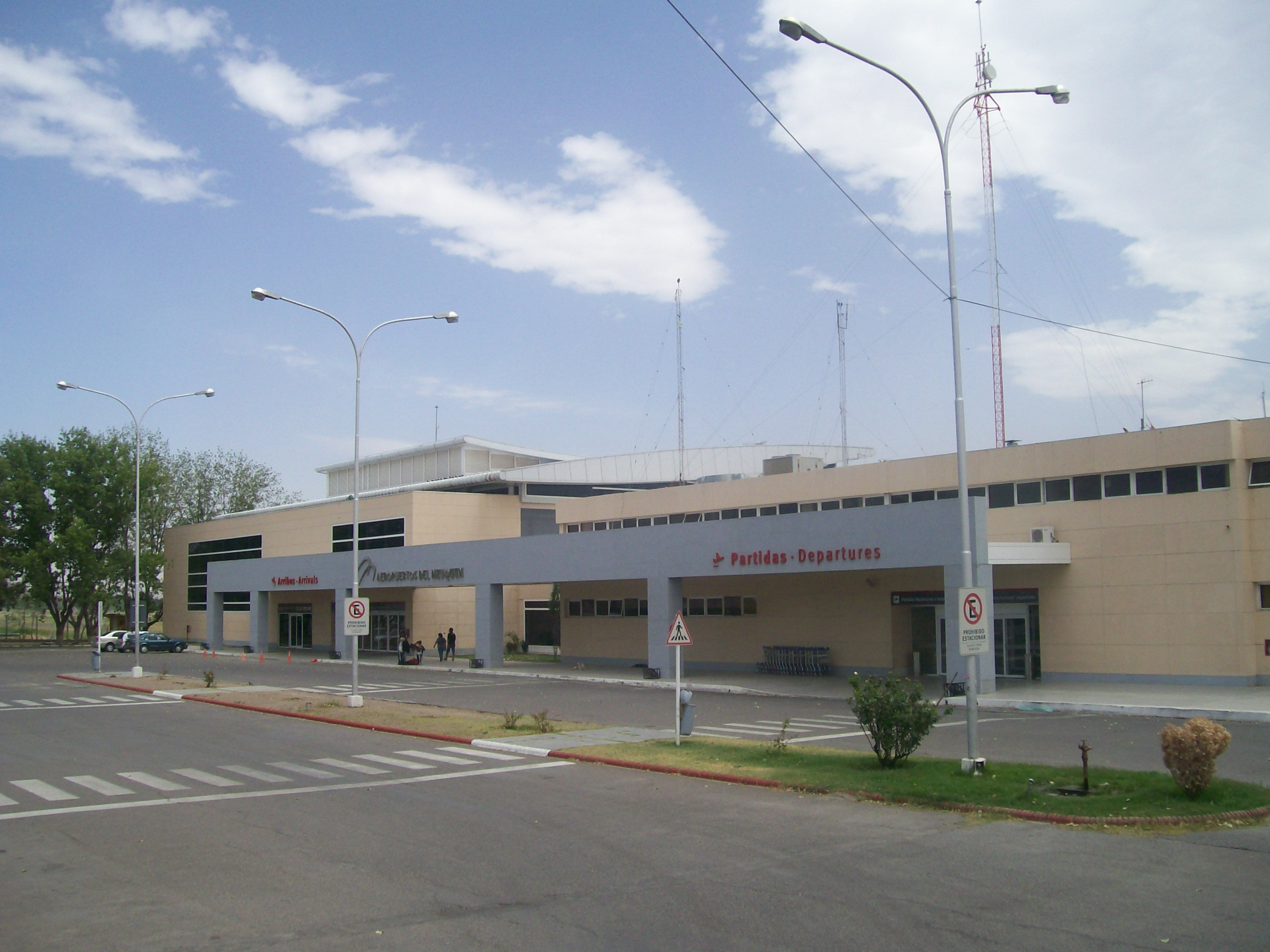
- IATA: NQN; ICAO: SAZN

Summary
- Airport type: Public / Military
- Operator: Government and Aeropuertos del Neuquén
- Serves: Neuquén, Argentina
- Elevation AMSL: 961 ft (293 m)
- Coordinates: 38°56′56″S 68°09′20″W

Map
- Location of airport in Argentina

Runways
Direction	Length		Surface
Direction	m	ft	Surface
09/27	2,570	8,432	Asphalt

Statistics (2016)
- Passengers: 777,942
- Passenger change 15–16: ▲0.5%
- Aircraft movements: 14,147
- Movements change 15–16: ▼3.8%
- Source: WAD GCM

Presidente Perón International Airport (Spanish: Aeropuerto Internacional de Neuquén – Presidente Perón) (IATA: NQN, ICAO: SAZN) is an airport in Neuquén Province, Argentina, serving the cities of Neuquén, Cipolletti, Plottier, Centenario, and General Roca. The airport is on the west side of Neuquén, a city at the confluence of the Limay and Neuquén Rivers.

== Overview ==
The airport is suitable for landing large aircraft such as the Boeing 757 or the Boeing 767. It has seven hangars, an Instrument landing system, and Precision Approach Path Indicator (PAPI) system.

== Airlines and destinations ==
Airlines	Destinations
Aerolíneas Argentinas	Buenos Aires–Aeroparque, Comodoro Rivadavia, Córdoba (AR), Mendoza, Rosario, Salta
American Jet	Chos Malal, San Martín de los Andes
JetSmart Argentina	Buenos Aires–Aeroparque, Buenos Aires–Ezeiza, Salta
LATAM Chile	Santiago de Chile
LADE	Bahía Blanca, Comodoro Rivadavia, Malargüe, Mendoza, Puerto Madryn

== Accidents and incidents ==
- 18 May 2011: Sol Líneas Aéreas Flight 5428 – On a Córdoba-Mendoza-Neuquén-Comodoro Rivadavia route, the plane crashed shortly after takeoff, killing everyone on board.

== See also ==
- Transport in Argentina
- List of airports in Argentina
