= Rosario – Islas Malvinas International Airport =

Airport in Argentina

Rosario – Islas Malvinas International Airport Aeropuerto Internacional de Rosario – Islas Malvinas
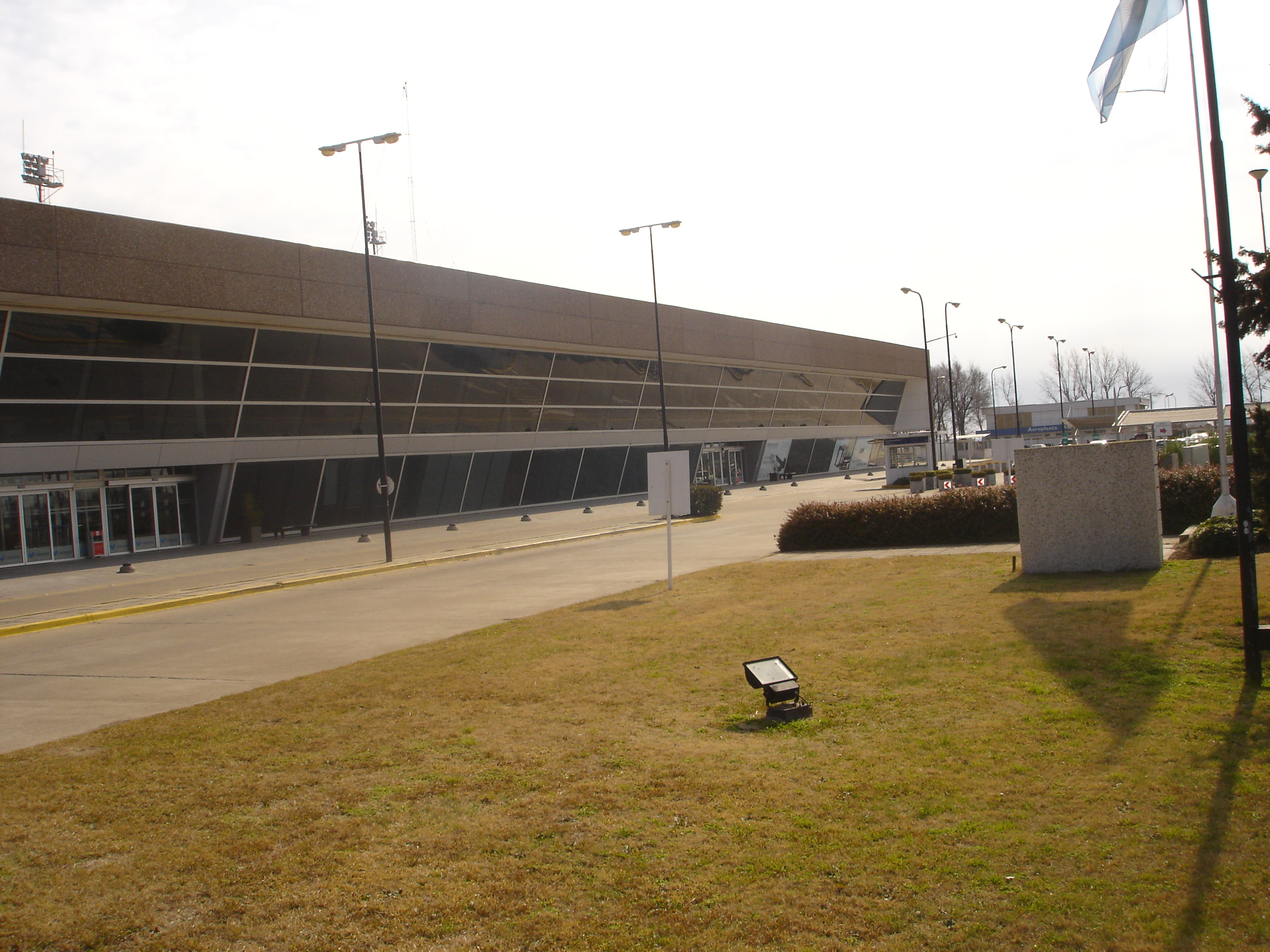
- IATA: ROS; ICAO: SAAR

Summary
- Airport type: Public
- Operator: Province of Santa Fe
- Serves: Rosario, Argentina
- Elevation AMSL: 85 ft (26 m)
- Coordinates: 32°54′13″S 60°47′04″W

Map
- Location of airport in Argentina

Runways
Direction	Length		Surface
Direction	m	ft	Surface
02/20	3,000	9,843	Concrete

Statistics (2016)
- Total passengers: 510.056
- Sources: Argentinian AIP, ORSNA

Rosario – Islas Malvinas International Airport (Spanish: Aeropuerto Internacional de Rosario – Islas Malvinas) (IATA: ROS, ICAO: SAAR), formerly known as Fisherton International Airport, is located 13 km (8.1 mi) west-northwest from the center of Rosario, a city in the Santa Fe Province of Argentina. The airport covers an area of 550 ha (1,400 acres) and is operated by the province of Santa Fe.

The airport serves the Greater Rosario area and is served by Aerolíneas Argentinas and COPA. There are domestic flights within Argentina from Rosario to Buenos Aires, Córdoba, Salta, Puerto Iguazú, San Carlos de Bariloche, El Calafate, Mar del Plata (via Buenos Aires), Mendoza (vía Córdoba), Santa Fe (via Buenos Aires) and Villa Gesell (only in summer, via Buenos Aires), as well as international services to Panama and Rio de Janeiro.

The airport is at an elevation of 26 m (85 ft) and the runway is 3,000 m × 60 m (9,843 ft × 197 ft). A new terminal was constructed between 2003 and 2004, effectively making Rosario an international airport.

During the first years of the 21st century the Rosario Airport lost a considerable volume of air traffic, even after being updated and expanded in 2003–2004. In 2005 there were only 1,807 flights, about 75% less than in 2000. Since 2013, however, it has been steadily growing in both traffic and connectivity.

The airport's name reflects Argentina's claims of sovereignty over the Falkland Islands (Islas Malvinas in Spanish).

== Airlines and destinations ==
Airlines	Destinations
Aerolíneas Argentinas	Buenos Aires–Aeroparque, Mendoza, Neuquen, Puerto Iguazú, Punta Cana, Salta, San Carlos de Bariloche; Seasonal: Florianópolis, Rio de Janeiro–Galeão; Seasonal charter: Cabo Frio
Arajet	Punta Cana
Copa Airlines	Panama City–Tocumen
Gol Linhas Aéreas	Rio de Janeiro–Galeão; Seasonal: Florianópolis, São Paulo–Guarulhos
LADE	Reconquista
LATAM Brasil	São Paulo–Guarulhos; Seasonal charter: Natal (begins 3 January 2027)
LATAM Peru	Lima
World2Fly	Madrid

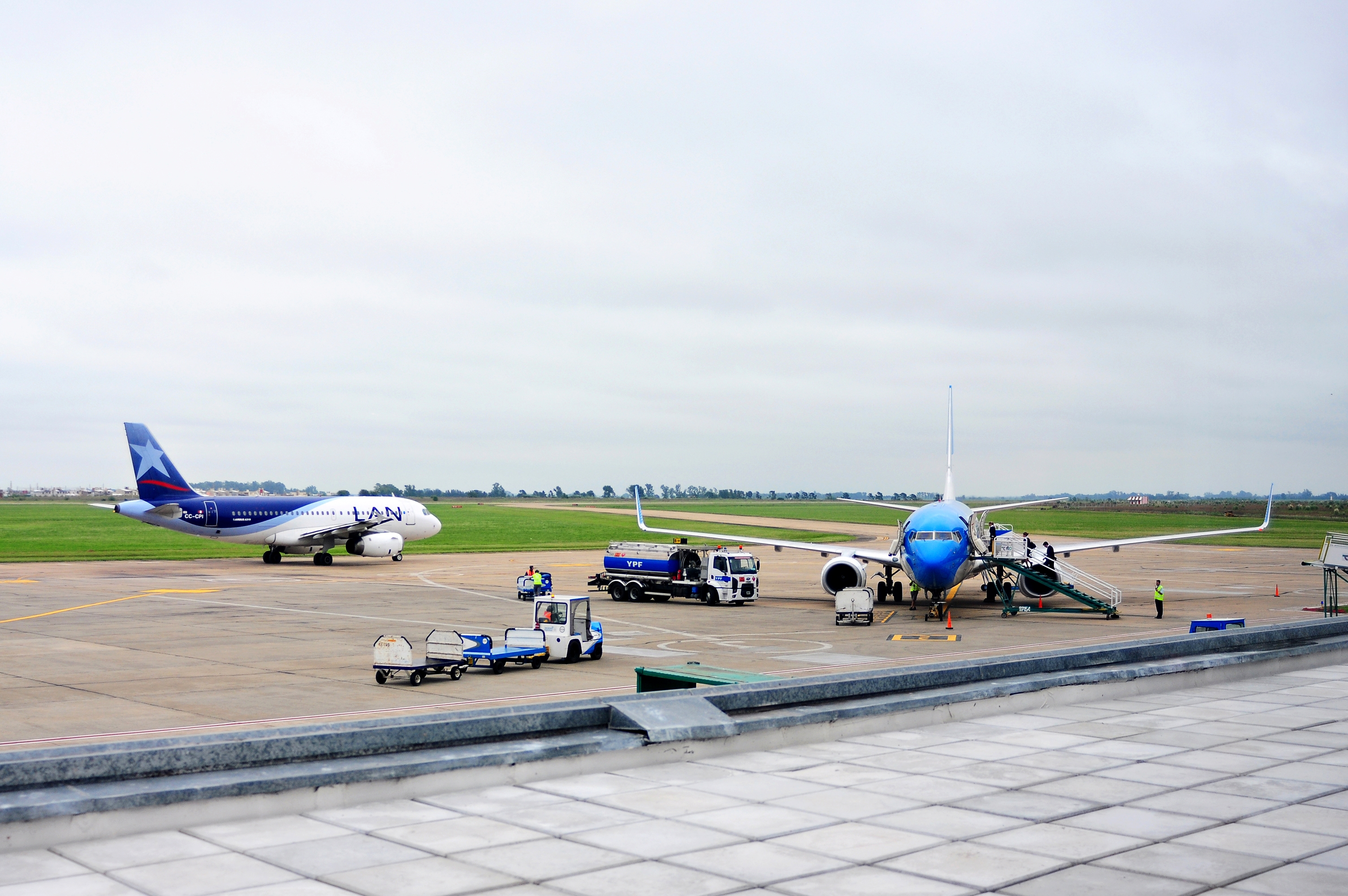
Lan Peru (now LATAM Perú ) and Aerolíneas Argentinas jets in Rosario.

== See also ==
- Transport in Argentina
- List of airports in Argentina
