= Astor Piazzolla Airport =

Airport in Mar del Plata, Argentina

Astor Piazzolla International Airport Aeropuerto Internacional de Mar del Plata "Ástor Piazzolla"
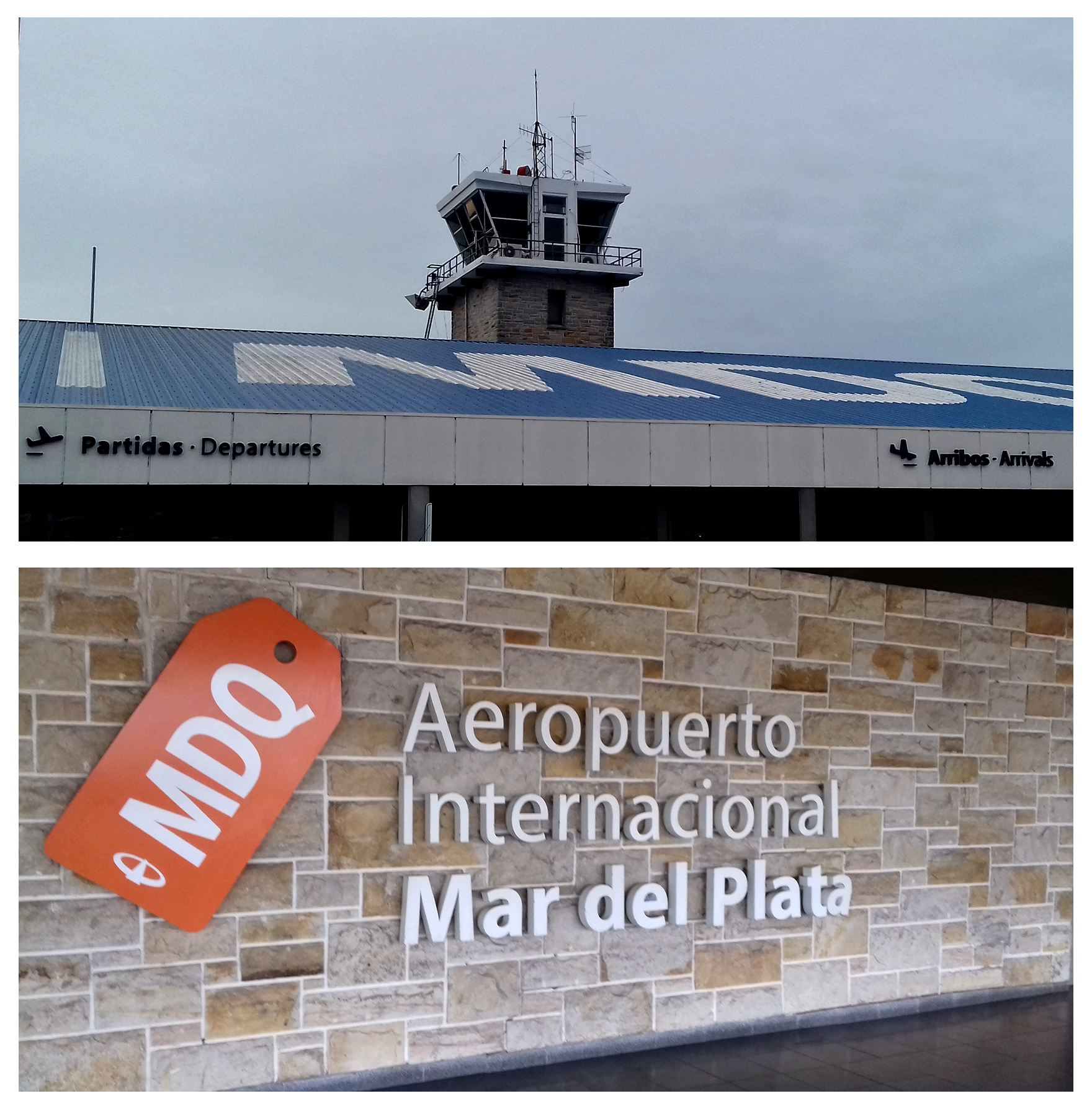
- IATA: MDQ; ICAO: SAZM

Summary
- Airport type: Public / Military
- Owner/Operator: Aeropuertos Argentina 2000
- Serves: Mar del Plata, Argentina
- Elevation AMSL: 71 ft (22 m)
- Coordinates: 37°56′03″S 57°34′25″W

Map
- Location of airport in Buenos Aires Province

Runways
Direction	Length		Surface
Direction	m	ft	Surface
13/31	2,200	7,218	Asphalt

Statistics (2017)
- Total passengers: 301,684
- Sources: ORSNA WAD GCM

Astor Piazzolla International Airport (Spanish: Aeropuerto Internacional de Mar del Plata Astor Piazzolla, IATA: MDQ, ICAO: SAZM), also known as Mar del Plata Airport, is an airport serving Mar del Plata, an Atlantic coastal city in the Buenos Aires Province of Argentina.

The airport was named after Brigadier General Bartolomé de la Colina, one of the founders of the Argentine Air Force. In August 2008 it was renamed in honour of composer and musician Astor Piazzolla, who was born in Mar del Plata.

The airport covers an area of 436 hectares (1,080 acres) and is operated by Aeropuertos Argentina 2000. The present terminal building was constructed in 1978 for the FIFA World Cup. In 1994 the terminal was expanded for the Pan American Games. Aeropuertos Argentina 2000 took over airport operation in October 1998.

== Airlines and destinations ==
Airlines	Destinations
Aerolíneas Argentinas	Bahía Blanca, Buenos Aires–Aeroparque, Córdoba (AR), Mendoza, Trelew
LADE	Bahía Blanca, Buenos Aires–Aeroparque, Puerto Madryn, San Carlos de Bariloche

== Statistics ==
Traffic by calendar year. Official ACI Statistics
	Passengers	Change from previous year	Aircraft operations	Change from previous year	Cargo (metric tons)	Change from previous year
2005	188,174	▼5.13%	6,320	▼2.86%	501	▼1.57%
2006	159,682	▼15.14%	5,456	▼13.67%	327	▼34.73%
2007	110,565	▼30.76%	5,267	▼3.46%	133	▼59.33%
2008	90,328	▼18.30%	5,955	▲13.06%	101	▼24.06%
2009	110,855	▲22.72%	6,037	▲1.38%	95	▼5.94%
2010	122,939	▲10.90%	6,238	▲3.33%	274	▲188.42%
2011	104,774	▼14.70%	5,734	▼8.10%	49	▼82.2%
2012	122,915	▲17.30%	6,066	▲5.70%	47	▼4.1%
2013	141,918	▲15.40%	6,571	▲8.3%	20	▼57.5%
2014	141,620	▼0.00%	6,727	▲2.30%	5	▼75%
2015	201,289	▲42.11%	7.356	▲9.30%	89	▲1680%
2016	204,931	▲1.80%	5.889	▼20.00%	77	▼13.5%
2017	301,684	▲32.70%	6.992	▲15.77%	170	▲120.8%
Source: ORSNA

== See also ==
- Transport in Argentina
- List of airports in Argentina
