= Martín Miguel de Güemes International Airport =

Airport in Argentina

Martín Miguel de Güemes International Airport Aeropuerto Internacional de Salta "Martín Miguel de Güemes"
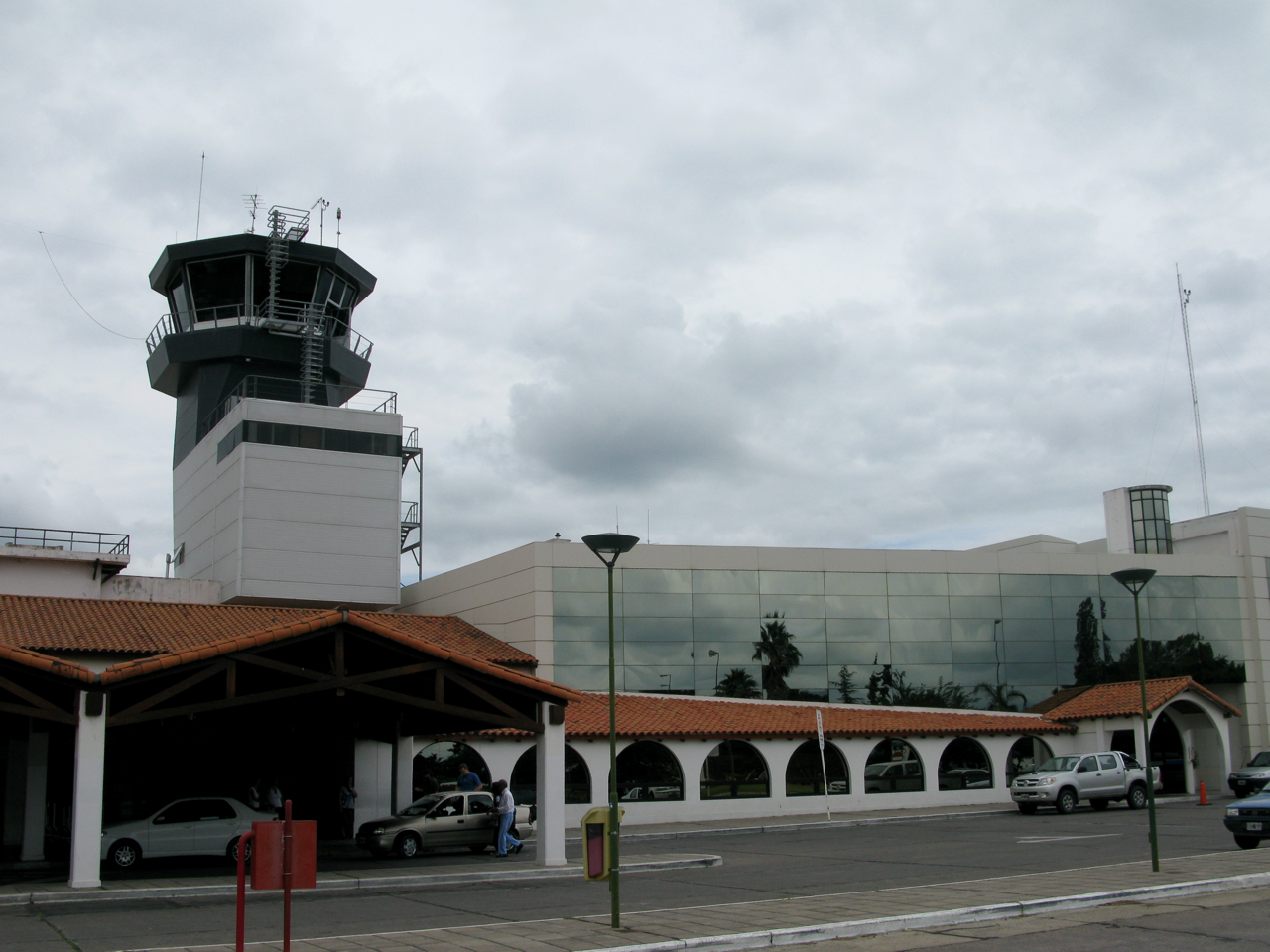
- IATA: SLA; ICAO: SASA

Summary
- Airport type: Public
- Operator: Aeropuertos Argentina
- Serves: Salta, Argentina
- Elevation AMSL: 4,091 ft (1,247 m)
- Coordinates: 24°50′40″S 65°28′43″W

Map
- Location of airport in Argentina

Runways
Direction	Length		Surface
Direction	m	ft	Surface
02/20	3,025	9,925	Asphalt
06/24	2,400	7,874	Asphalt

Statistics (2023)
- Total passengers: 1,460,349
- Source: AIP, ORSNA, WAD

Martín Miguel de Güemes International Airport (Spanish: Aeropuerto Internacional de Salta "Martín Miguel de Güemes") (IATA: SLA, ICAO: SASA) is located 7 km (4.3 mi) southwest of the center of Salta, capital city of Salta Province, in Argentina. The airport covers an area of 208 hectares (510 acres) and is operated by Aeropuertos Argentina 2000

Also known as El Aybal Airport, it is the main hub of the Argentine Andes, served by Aerolíneas Argentinas and Andes Líneas Aéreas. In 2023 it handled 1.460.349 passengers, making it the most used airport in northern Argentina and the seven most used in Argentina. . The new terminal was built in 2000 by Aeropuertos Argentina 2000.

In late 2023, LATAM Perú returned to Salta Airport, restarting its route to Lima. This is an important connection to international destinations, such as São Paulo-Guarulhos, Madrid-Barajas and Miami outside Buenos Aires.

As of 2024, the passenger terminal is being modernized to handle over 1.5 million passengers per year.

== Airlines and destinations ==
Airlines	Destinations
Aerolíneas Argentinas	Buenos Aires–Aeroparque, Córdoba (AR), Mendoza, Neuquén, Puerto Iguazú, Resistencia, Rosario, San Carlos de Bariloche, São Paulo–Guarulhos, Tucumán; Seasonal: Florianópolis
Copa Airlines	Panama City–Tocumen
Gol Linhas Aéreas	Seasonal: Rio de Janeiro–Galeão (begins 18 December 2026)
JetSmart Argentina	Buenos Aires–Aeroparque, Buenos Aires–Ezeiza, Mendoza, Neuquén
LATAM Perú	Lima
Paranair	Asunción

== Statistics ==
Traffic by calendar year. Official ACI Statistics
	Passengers	Change from previous year	Aircraft operations	Change from previous year	Cargo (metric tons)	Change from previous year
2005	294,708	▼8.18%	6,948	▼13.34%	1,336	▲4.95%
2006	298,342	▲1.23%	6,751	▼2.84%	1,434	▲7.34%
2007	397,578	▲33.26%	7,678	▲13.73%	1,387	▼3.28%
2008	466,492	▲17.33%	8,684	▲13.10%	1,624	▲17.09%
2009	557,417	▲19.49%	9,707	▲11.78%	1,564	▼3.69%
2010	614,012	▲10.15%	10,372	▲6.85%	1,438	▼8.06%
Source: Airports Council International. World Airport Traffic Statistics (Years 2005-2010)

== See also ==
- Transport in Argentina
- List of airports in Argentina
