= JetSmart Argentina =

Argentine airline

IATA	ICAO	Call sign
WJ	JES	SMARTBIRD
- Founded: 2016 (as Alas del Sur)
- Commenced operations: 10 April 2019
- Operating bases: Aeroparque Jorge Newbery; Ministro Pistarini International Airport
- Fleet size: 15
- Destinations: 21
- Parent company: JetSmart
- Headquarters: Buenos Aires, Argentina
- Website: jetsmart.com

JetSmart Airlines S.A., styled as JetSMART, is an Argentine airline owned by ultra low-cost carrier JetSmart, itself owned by Indigo Partners, a firm that also has stakes in US-based Frontier Airlines, Mexico-based Volaris, and Hungary-based Wizz Air. The airline uses the branding and corporate identity of JetSmart, its parent company, and operates a fleet of Airbus A320 family aircraft with a base at Aeroparque Jorge Newbery in Buenos Aires. Its aircraft are registered in Argentina.

== History ==
The airline was originally established in 2016 as Alas del Sur Líneas Aéreas (English: Southern Wing Airlines), with plans to establish a hub in Córdoba. The plans consisted of an April 2017 launch date with short-haul flights from Córdoba to South American destinations added throughout 2017, and long-haul flights from Argentina to North America, Europe, and Asia by 2022. The airline planned to operate a fleet of Airbus A320 and Boeing 777 aircraft. However, as the airline did not receive an air operator's certificate, the start of service was postponed. In June 2018, Indigo Partners acquired the startup airline through its Chilean subsidiary JetSmart, allowing for JetSmart's entry into Argentina's domestic aviation market, and the airline was subsequently rebranded as JetSmart Argentina.

JetSmart Argentina received its air operator's certificate and its first aircraft, an Airbus A320-200 registered as LV-HEK, in December 2018. In February 2019, the airline announced and opened reservations for its first services beginning on 10 April 2019, which were to be operated from a new base at El Palomar Airport near Buenos Aires, after its parent company had previously operated flights to the airport from Santiago de Chile. The airline announced further expansion plans in August 2019, with Rosario as a new destination to launch in November 2019, and that it would increase its Airbus A320 fleet to six aircraft.

Following JetSmart's acquisition of Norwegian Air Argentina in December 2019, the airline planned to launch services from Norwegian's Aeroparque Jorge Newbery base in March 2020. As Argentina's Civil Aviation Administration had not immediately transferred Norwegian's Aeroparque-based route authorities to JetSmart Argentina, Norwegian's fleet of Boeing 737s was wet-leased and operated under a separate, rebranded entity named JetSmart Regional. The services at Aeroparque were ultimately suspended as an impact of the COVID-19 pandemic on aviation, with JetSmart Argentina's existing services additionally relocated from El Palomar Airport to Ezeiza International Airport by late 2020. In early 2021, it was reported that the airline would not return to El Palomar and instead relocate its services to Aeroparque, with operations at the airport and new base launching in March 2021.

== Destinations ==
As of May 2024, JetSmart Argentina operates or has operated to the following destinations:

Country	City	Airport	Notes	Refs
Argentina	Bariloche	Teniente Luis Candelaria Airport		
Argentina	Buenos Aires	Aeroparque Jorge Newbery	Base	
Argentina	Buenos Aires	El Palomar Airport	Terminated	
Argentina	Buenos Aires	Ministro Pistarini International Airport	Base	
Argentina	Córdoba	Ingeniero Aeronáutico Ambrosio L.V. Taravella International Airport		
Argentina	Corrientes	Doctor Fernando Piragine Niveyro International Airport		
Argentina	El Calafate	Comandante Armando Tola International Airport		
Argentina	Mendoza	Governor Francisco Gabrielli International Airport		
Argentina	Neuquén	Presidente Perón International Airport		
Argentina	Puerto Iguazú	Cataratas del Iguazú International Airport		
Argentina	Rosario	Rosario – Islas Malvinas International Airport	Terminated	
Argentina	Salta	Martín Miguel de Güemes International Airport		
Argentina	San Martín de los Andes	Aviador Carlos Campos Airport		
Argentina	San Miguel de Tucumán	Teniente General Benjamín Matienzo International Airport		
Argentina	San Salvador de Jujuy	Gobernador Horacio Guzmán International Airport		
Argentina	Ushuaia	Ushuaia – Malvinas Argentinas International Airport		
Brazil	Curitiba	Afonso Pena International Airport		
Brazil	Florianópolis	Hercílio Luz International Airport		
Brazil	Porto Alegre	Salgado Filho International Airport		
Brazil	Recife	Recife International Airport		
Brazil	Rio de Janeiro	Rio de Janeiro/Galeão International Airport		
Chile	Antofagasta	Andrés Sabella Gálvez International Airport	Terminated	
Chile	Concepción	Carriel Sur International Airport	Terminated	
Chile	Santiago	Arturo Merino Benítez International Airport		
Paraguay	Asunción	Silvio Pettirossi International Airport		
Uruguay	Montevideo	Carrasco International Airport		

== Fleet ==
As of August 2025, JetSmart Argentina operates an all-Airbus A320 family fleet composed of the following aircraft:

JetSmart Argentina fleet
Aircraft	In service	Orders	Passengers	Notes
Airbus A320-200	10	—	186	
Airbus A320neo	1	—	186	
Airbus A321neo	4	—	240	
Total	15	—		
