= Domingo Faustino Sarmiento Airport =

Airport serving San Juan, Argentina

Domingo Faustino Sarmiento Airport Aeropuerto de San Juan
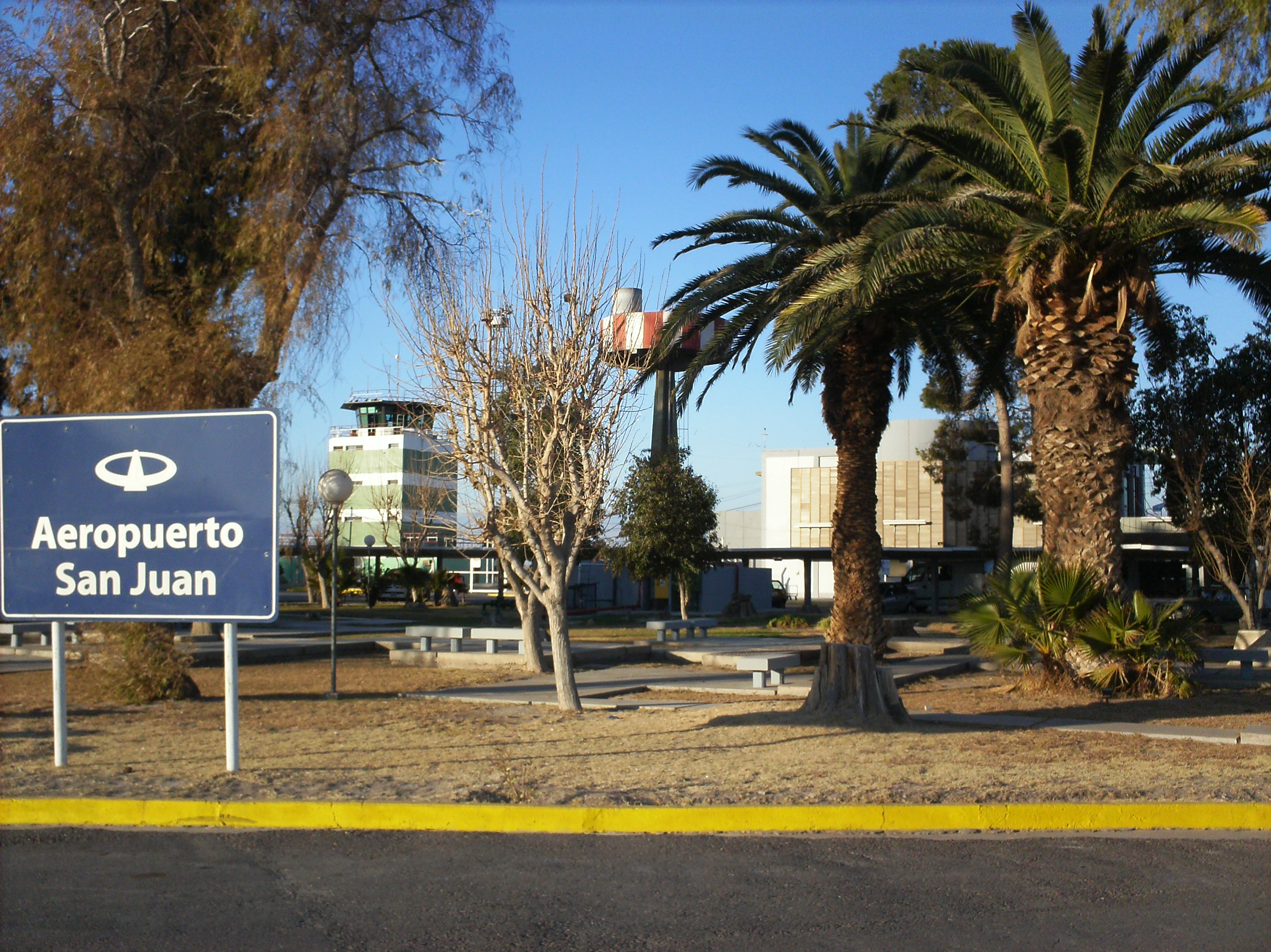
- IATA: UAQ; ICAO: SANU

Summary
- Airport type: Public
- Operator: Aeropuertos Argentina 2000
- Serves: San Juan
- Elevation AMSL: 1,949 ft (594 m)
- Coordinates: 31°34′20″S 68°25′05″W

Map
- Location of airport in Argentina

Runways
Direction	Length		Surface
Direction	m	ft	Surface
18/36	2,460	8,071	Asphalt

Statistics (2016)
- Passengers: 371,211
- Passenger change 15–16: ▲94.4%
- Aircraft movements: 4,285
- Movements change 15–16: ▲35.99%
- Source: SkyVector Google Maps GCM

Domingo Faustino Sarmiento Airport (Spanish: Aeropuerto de San Juan – Domingo Faustino Sarmiento) (IATA: UAQ, ICAO: SANU) is an airport in San Juan Province, Argentina, serving the city of San Juan. It is named after Domingo Faustino Sarmiento (1811–1888), the seventh President of Argentina.

Planning to build San Juan Airport started on 15 February 1958. The plans were authorized in 1961, and construction started in 1971. It was almost finished by 1977, but was destroyed in the 1977 San Juan earthquake. Reconstruction occurred between 1977 and 1980, and the new airport was inaugurated on 25 February 1981. It is operated by Aeropuertos Argentina 2000.

The airport became international in 1980s when Ladeco operated a flight between San Juan and La Serena, Chile and the service was later ended in mid-1990s.

== Airlines and destinations ==
Airlines	Destinations
Aerolíneas Argentinas	Buenos Aires–Aeroparque, Buenos Aires–Ezeiza, Córdoba (AR)

== Statistics ==
Traffic by calendar year. Official ACI Statistics
	Passengers	Change from previous year	Aircraft operations	Change from previous year	Cargo (metric tons)	Change from previous year
2005	63,706	▼5.44%	1,457	▲0.76%	347	▲3.58%
2006	67,715	▲6.29%	1,252	▼14.07%	384	▲10.66%
2007	68,756	▲1.54%	1,278	▲2.08%	346	▼9.90%
2008	68,858	▲0.15%	1,350	▲5.63%	306	▼11.56%
2009	104,980	▲52.46%	1,515	▲12.22%	303	▼0.98%
2010	131,047	▲24.83%	2,451	▲61.78%	418	▲37.95%
Source: Airports Council International. World Airport Traffic Statistics (Years 2005-2010)
