= Piloto Civil Norberto Fernández International Airport =

Airport in Argentina

Piloto Civil Norberto Fernández International Airport Aeropuerto de Rio Gallegos
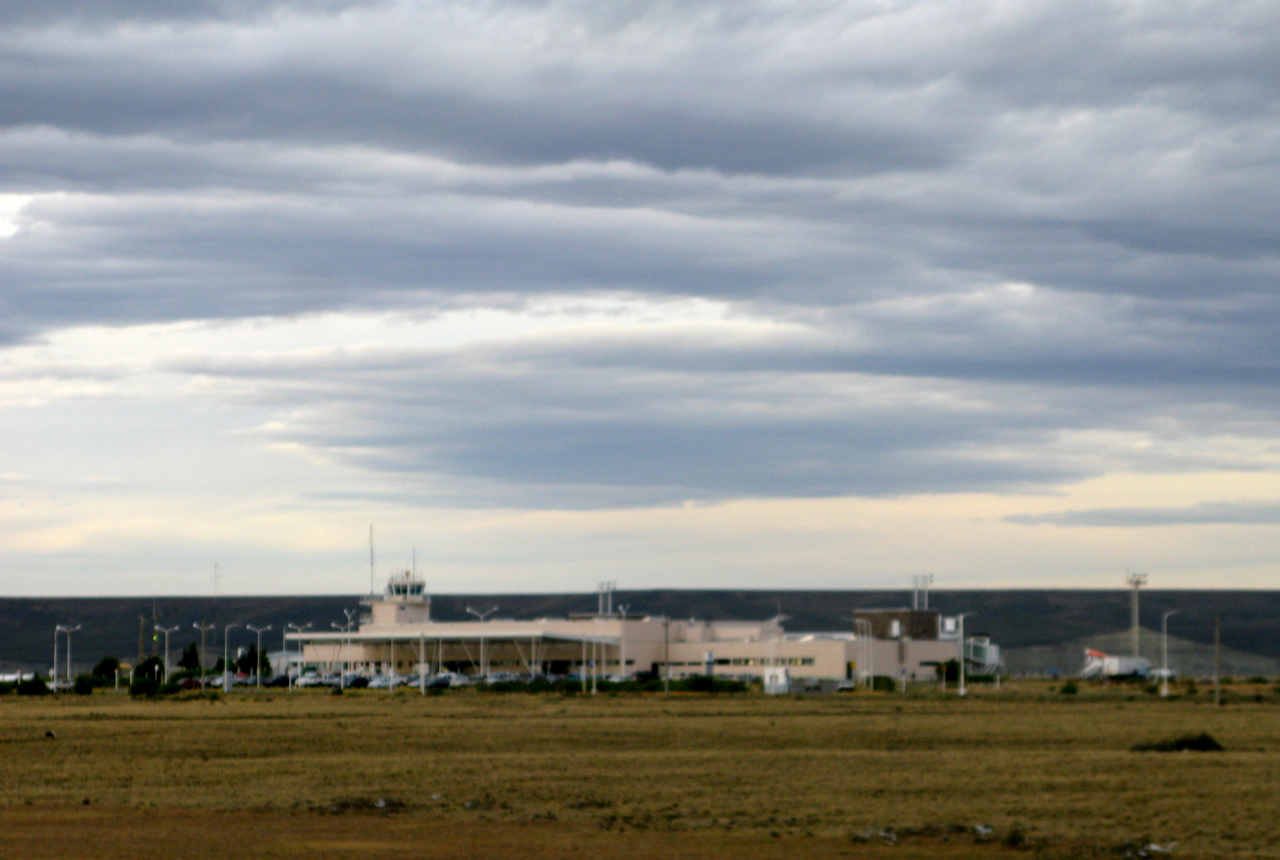
- IATA: RGL; ICAO: SAWG

Summary
- Airport type: Public / Military
- Operator: Aeropuertos Argentina 2000
- Serves: Río Gallegos, Argentina
- Elevation AMSL: 66 ft (20 m)
- Coordinates: 51°36′32″S 69°18′45″W

Map
- Location of the airport in Argentina

Runways
Direction	Length		Surface
Direction	m	ft	Surface
07/25	3,550	11,647	Concrete

Statistics (2010)
- Passengers: 236,792
- Passenger change 09–10: ▼3.2%
- Aircraft movements: 3,395
- Movements change 09–10: ▼14.3%
- Sources: WAD GCM AIP

Piloto Civil Norberto Fernández International Airport (Spanish: Aeropuerto de Río Gallegos "Piloto Civil Norberto Fernández", IATA: RGL, ICAO: SAWG) is located 2 kilometres (1 mi) west of Río Gallegos, a city in the Santa Cruz Province of Argentina. The airport covers an area of 1,150 hectares (2,800 acres) and is operated by Aeropuertos Argentina 2000.

The airport was constructed in 1964, and the paved runway was inaugurated in 1972 with a Caravelle flight of Aerolíneas Argentinas. The runway is the longest in Argentina.

During the late 1980s, the airport was a scheduled stop on a polar route passenger flight from Buenos Aires to Auckland, New Zealand and Sydney, Australia operated by Aerolineas Argentinas with Boeing 747-200 wide body jetliners.

== Airlines and destinations ==
Airlines	Destinations
Aerolíneas Argentinas	Buenos Aires-Aeroparque, Comodoro Rivadavia, Trelew
LADE	Comodoro Rivadavia, El Calafate, Río Grande, Ushuaia
LATAM Chile	Punta Arenas, Stanley–Mount Pleasant

== Statistics ==
Traffic by calendar year. Official ACI Statistics
	Passengers	Change from previous year	Aircraft operations	Change from previous year	Cargo (metric tons)	Change from previous year
2005	191,202	▼2.09%	5,530	▼20.50%	882	▼15.03%
2006	197,785	▲3.44%	5,338	▼3.47%	786	▼10.88%
2007	201,623	▲1.94%	5,710	▲6.97%	703	▼10.56%
2008	199,567	▼1.02%	5,480	▼4.03%	611	▼13.09%
2009	244,728	▲22.63%	3,959	▼27.76%	442	▼27.66%
2010	236,792	▼3.24%	3,395	▼14.25%	563	▲27.38%
Source: Airports Council International. World Airport Traffic Statistics (Years 2005-2010)

== See also ==
- Transport in Argentina
- List of airports in Argentina
