= Esquel Airport =

Airport in Argentina

Esquel Airport Aeropuerto de Esquel
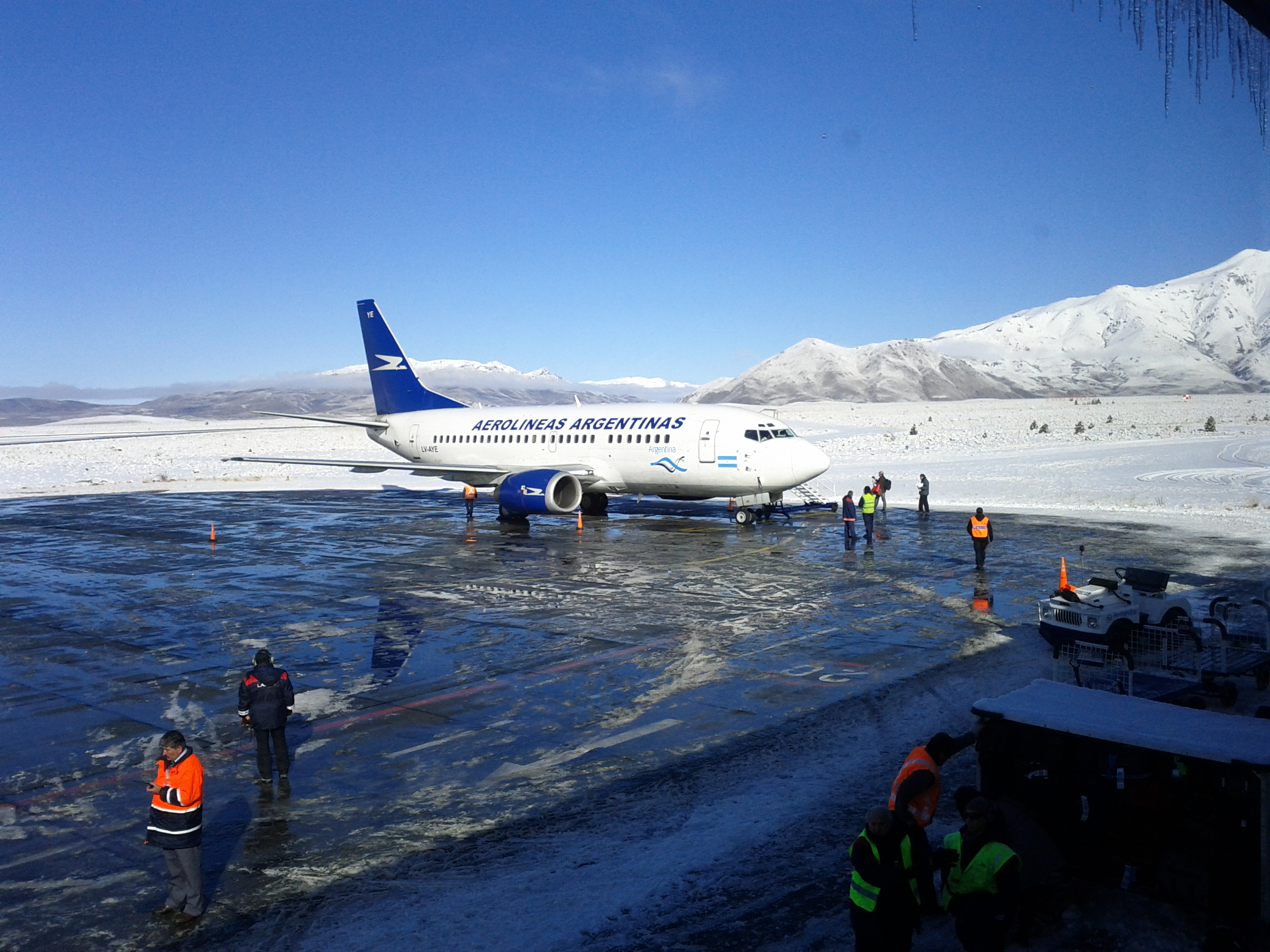
- IATA: EQS; ICAO: SAVE

Summary
- Airport type: Public
- Operator: Government and Aeropuertos Argentina 2000
- Serves: Esquel
- Location: Ruta 40, Km 1771. (U9200)
- Elevation AMSL: 2,621 ft (799 m)
- Coordinates: 42°54′24.20″S 71°08′48″W

Map
- Location of airport in Argentina

Runways
Direction	Length		Surface
Direction	m	ft	Surface
05/23	2,400	7,869	Concrete
08/26	1,232	4,043	Gravel

Statistics (2016)
- Passengers: 46,693
- Passenger change 15–16: ▲7.3%
- Aircraft movements: 1057
- Movements change 09–10: ▲0.1%
- Source: DAFIF, 2010 World Airport Traffic Report.

Esquel Airport (Spanish: Aeropuerto de Esquel, IATA: EQS, ICAO: SAVE), officially the Brigadier General Antonio Parodi International Airport, is an international airport in Chubut Province, Argentina serving the city of Esquel.

It was built in 1944, and was officially inaugurated on April 17, 1945. The new terminal was constructed in 1978. The only runway was paved in 1973, and re-paved in 1999 because it was badly damaged.

It has a 1,050m² passenger terminal, 96,500m² of runways, and a 1,050m² hangar.

Since 1998, it has been operated by Aeropuertos Argentina 2000. In 2010, 21,561 passengers flew through Esquel Airport.

The airport closed temporarily in May 2008 because of volcanic activities in El Chaitén, Chile.

== Airlines and destinations ==
Airlines	Destinations
Aerolíneas Argentinas	Buenos Aires–Aeroparque, Córdoba (AR)

== Statistics ==
Traffic by calendar year. Official ACI Statistics
	Passengers	Change from previous year	Aircraft operations	Change from previous year
2005	25,216	▲7.01%	1,418	▼5.09%
2006	26,598	▲5.48%	1,305	▼7.97%
2007	24,892	▼6.41%	1,352	▲3.60%
2008	10,585	▼57.48%	762	▼43.64%
2009	17,525	▲65.56%	816	▲7.09%
2010	21,561	▲23.03%	837	▲2.57%
Source: Airports Council International. World Airport Traffic Statistics (Years 2005-2010)
