= Vicecomodoro Ángel de la Paz Aragonés Airport =

Airport in Argentina

Vicecomodoro Ángel de la Paz Aragonés Airport Aeropuerto de Santiago del Estero
- IATA: SDE; ICAO: SANE

Summary
- Airport type: Public
- Operator: Aeropuertos Argentina 2000
- Serves: Santiago del Estero, Argentina
- Elevation AMSL: 659 ft (201 m)
- Coordinates: 27°46′00″S 64°18′35″W

Map
- Airport in Argentina

Runways
Direction	Length		Surface
Direction	m	ft	Surface
03/21	2,635	8,645	Asphalt

Statistics (2016)
- Total passengers: 94,980
- Sources: ORSNA, WAD GCM Google Maps

Vicecomodoro Ángel de la Paz Aragonés Airport (Spanish: Aeropuerto de Santiago del Estero – Ángel de la Paz Aragonés) (IATA: SDE, ICAO: SANE) is located 6 kilometres (4 mi) northwest of downtown Santiago del Estero, the capital of Santiago del Estero Province in Argentina. The airport covers an area of 526 hectares (1299 acres) and is operated by Aeropuertos Argentina 2000.

Also known as Santiago del Estero Airport or Mal Paso Airport, it was built in 1959 and the runway was re-paved in 2001. It has a 1,000 square metres (11,000 sq ft) terminal and 45 parking spaces. In 2007, it handled 49,517 passengers. The airport does not handle international flights. It is served by Flybondi 737-800.

Runway length includes a 200 metres (660 ft) blast pad on Runway 03. Runway 03 has an additional 200 metres (660 ft) paved overrun. The Santiago Del Estero VOR (Ident: SDE) and non-directional beacon (Ident: D) are located on the field.

== Airlines and destinations ==
Airlines	Destinations
Aerolíneas Argentinas	Buenos Aires–Aeroparque

== See also ==
- Transport in Argentina
- List of airports in Argentina
