= Teniente General Benjamín Matienzo International Airport =

Airport in Argentina

Teniente Benjamín Matienzo International Airport
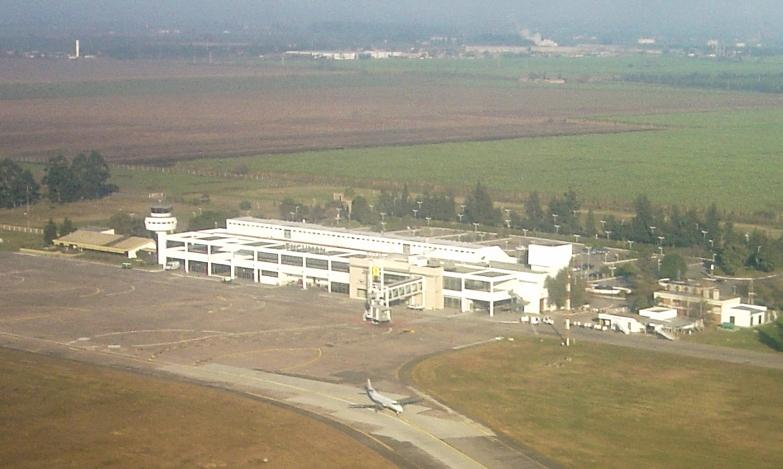
- IATA: TUC; ICAO: SANT

Summary
- Airport type: Public
- Operator: Government and Aeropuertos Argentina 2000
- Serves: San Miguel de Tucumán, Argentina
- Elevation AMSL: 1,495 ft (456 m)
- Coordinates: 26°50′27″S 65°06′17″W

Map
- Location of the airport in Argentina

Runways
Direction	Length		Surface
Direction	m	ft	Surface
02/20	3,500	11,483	Concrete

Statistics (2017)
- Total passengers: 567,310
- Source: SkyVector GCM

Teniente Benjamín Matienzo International Airport (IATA: TUC, ICAO: SANT) is an international airport 12 kilometres (7.5 mi) east of the city of San Miguel de Tucumán in Argentina. It serves Tucumán Province in the north of the country. It was built in 1981, and its terminal was inaugurated on 12 October 1986. The airport provides four departure gates, two arrival gates, immigration and passenger services, plus the second largest cargo terminal in Argentina.

The airport is named in honor of Benjamín Matienzo who died in the first attempt to fly over the Andes to Chile.

== Overview ==
This airport replaced the old one, located on the Ninth of July Park, because of its location only 650 metres (2,133 ft) from the Plaza Independencia, and the lack of space for expansion, plus noise restrictions and the risks of having an airport in the very city centre. The old airport had one runway of 1,600 metres (5,200 ft) and was closed in 1987. The main bus station uses parts of the apron of the airport, while the Music School from the Universidad Nacional de Tucumán uses the former passenger terminal.

The departures pavilion was rebuilt in 2005, with international flights facilities and a jet bridge. It can accommodate all kinds of aircraft, such as the Boeing 767, Airbus A330 or Boeing 777. A freight terminal was constructed in 2013.

On 9 April 2013, the runway designation changed from 01/19 to 02/20 due to magnetic variation. The airport was closed between June and September 2017, when the runway was extended from 2,900 to 3,500 metres (9,500 to 11,500 ft), making it the longest in Argentina.

== Airlines and destinations ==
=== Passenger ===
Airlines	Destinations
Aerolíneas Argentinas	Buenos Aires–Aeroparque, Córdoba (AR), Puerto Iguazú, Punta Cana, Salta, San Carlos de Bariloche; Seasonal: Buenos Aires–Ezeiza,, Florianópolis, Mar del Plata
Copa Airlines	Panama City–Tocumen
JetSmart Argentina	Buenos Aires–Aeroparque, Buenos Aires–Ezeiza

=== Cargo ===
Tucumán is the second busiest airport in Argentina by cargo tonnage, after Buenos Aires-Ezeiza. Most cargo flights are scheduled between September and November, taking fresh fruit to Europe and the United States.

Airlines	Destinations
Atlas Air	Miami
LATAM Cargo Chile	Seasonal: Miami

== Statistics ==
Traffic by calendar year. Official ORSNA statistics
	Passengers	Change from previous year	Aircraft operations	Change from previous year	Cargo (metric tons)	Change from previous year
2011	404,040	▼1.71%	6,007	▼2.21%	4,937	▲58,95%
2012	444,893	▲10.11%	5,655	▼5.86%	5,167	▲4.59%
2013	500,906	▲12.59%	6,099	▲7.85%	3,427	▼33.64%
2014	523,191	▲4.45%	5,538	▼9.20%	5,950	▲73.62%
Source: ORSNA (es)

== Ground transportation ==
Tucumán International Airport has direct public transport links to San Miguel de Tucumán served by Bus nº 121 to the Bus Terminal Station, through AV. Avellaneda. Route A016 (continuation from Av. Sarmiento) provides access to the City Center. Taxis and rental cars are available as well, as is the case in most airports.

== Accidents and incidents ==
- On 28 August 1975, leftist guerillas set off explosives on the runway as a military C-130 Hercules plane was attempting to take off. Four people on board were killed and 35 injured.
- In 1981, Austral Líneas Aéreas Flight 901 crashed in a river near Buenos Aires, en route from Tucumán, killing all 31 on board.

== See also ==
- Transport in Argentina
- List of airports in Argentina
