= El Tehuelche Airport =

El Tehuelche Airport Aeropuerto El Tehuelche
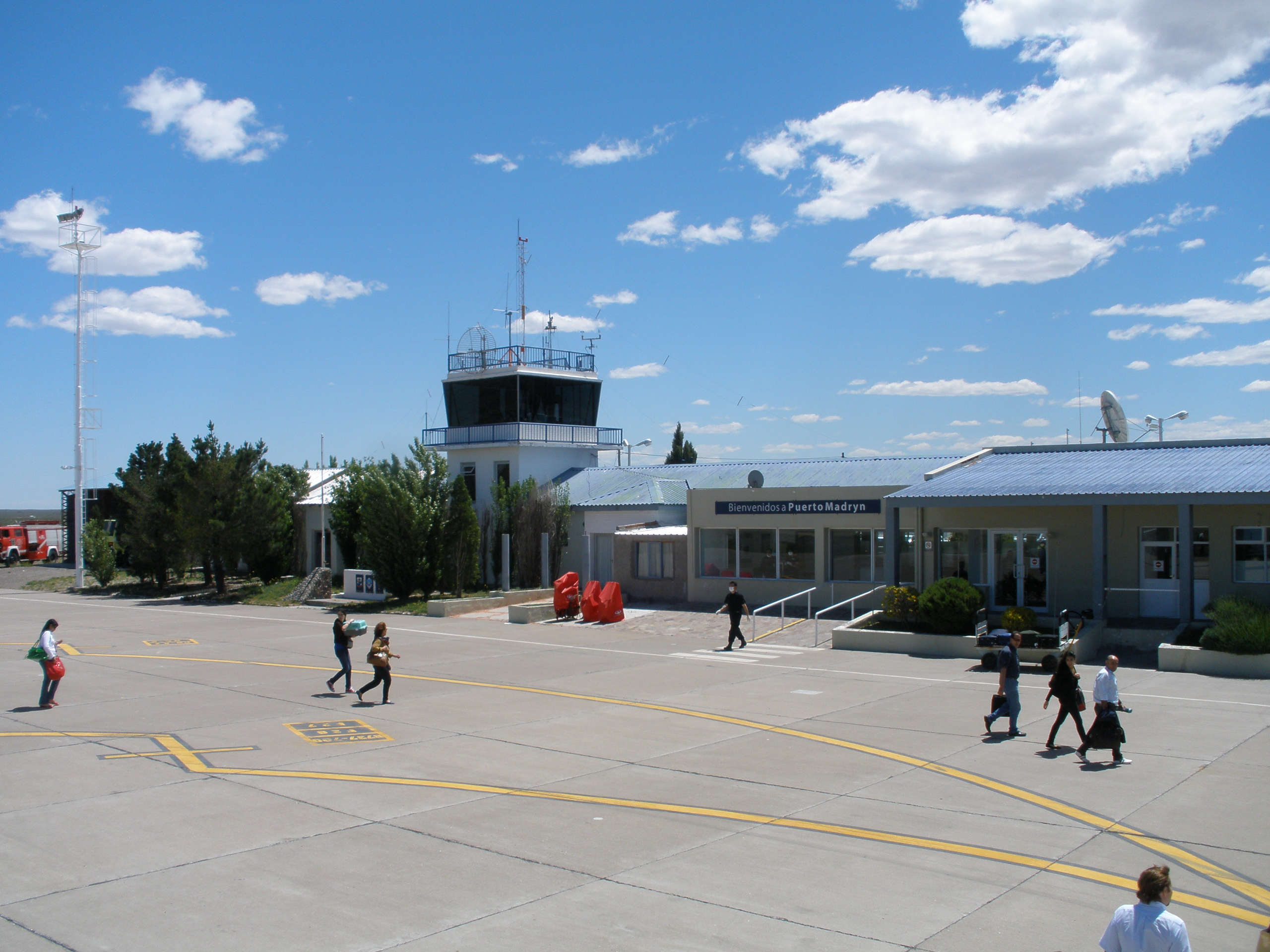
- IATA: PMY; ICAO: SAVY

Summary
- Airport type: Public
- Owner: Argentine Ministry of Planning and Public Services
- Operator: Aeropuertos Argentina 2000
- Serves: Puerto Madryn, Argentina
- Elevation AMSL: 433 ft (132 m)
- Coordinates: 42°45′30″S 65°06′05″W

Map
- Location of airport in Argentina

Runways
| Direction | Length | | Surface |
| Direction | m | ft | Surface |
|---|---|---|---|
| 06/24 | 2,500 | 8,202 | Asphalt |

Statistics (2016)
- Passengers: 53,150
- Passenger change 15–16: ▲6.9%
- Aircraft movements: 772
- Movements change 15–16: ▲2.1%
- Source: Landings.com, SkyVector

El Tehuelche Airport (Spanish: Aeropuerto El Tehuelche, Welsh: Maes Awyr El Tehuelche) (IATA: PMY, ICAO: SAVY) is an airport 5 kilometres (3 mi) northwest of Puerto Madryn, a city on Golfo Nuevo in the Chubut Province of Argentina. The airport is 5 kilometres (3 mi) inland from the gulf, on the 3-RN Acceso Norte Puerto Madryn (U9120).

== Airlines and destinations ==
| Airlines | Destinations |
|---|---|
| Aerolíneas Argentinas | Buenos Aires–Aeroparque |

== Infrastructure ==
The total area of land is 1,063 hectares (2,630 acres).

== Statistics ==
Traffic by calendar year. Official ACI Statistics
| | Passengers | Change from previous year | Aircraft operations | Change from previous year | Cargo (metric tons) | Change from previous year |
|---|---|---|---|---|---|---|
| 2005 | 10,568 | ▼45.49% | 966 | ▲0.42% | 1 | ▼50.00% |
| 2006 | 14,345 | ▲35.74% | 1,197 | ▲23.91% | 42 | ▲4100.00% |
| 2007 | 38,901 | ▲171.18% | 925 | ▼22.72% | 29 | ▼30.95% |
| 2008 | 38,448 | ▼1.16% | 1,072 | ▲15.89% | 21 | ▼27.59% |
| 2009 | 31,140 | ▼19.01% | 925 | ▼13.71% | 28 | ▲33.33% |
| 2010 | 40,411 | ▲29.77% | 1,287 | ▲39.14% | 41 | ▲46.43% |
Source: Airports Council International. World Airport Traffic Statistics (Years 2005-2010)

== See also ==
- Transport in Argentina
- List of airports in Argentina
