= List of the busiest airports in Argentina =

The following is a list of busiest airports in Argentina by passengers traffic as reported by the country's National Civil Aviation Administration (ANAC). For each airport, the lists cite the principal city associated with the airport, not necessarily the municipality where the airport is physically located.

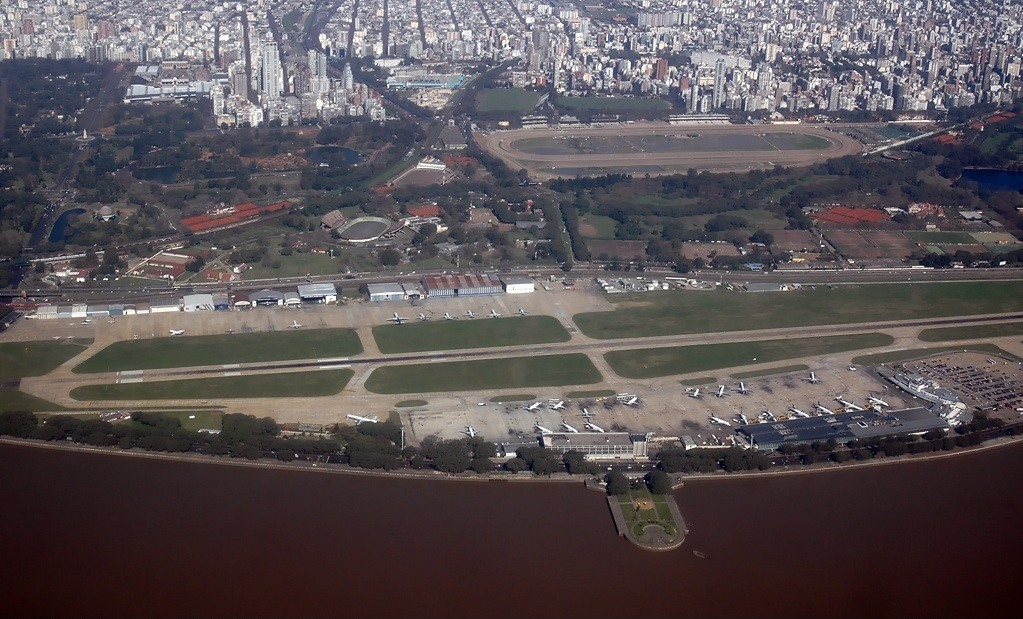
Aeroparque Jorge Newbery, the busiest airport in the country and the main domestic hub in Buenos Aires.

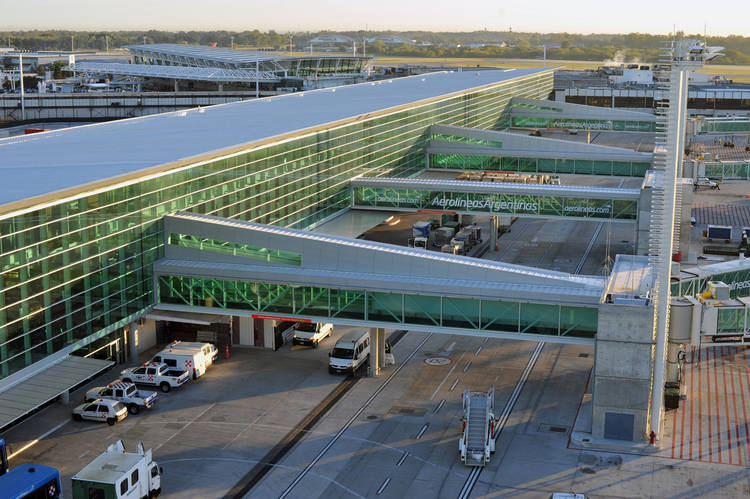
Ezeiza Airport, the main international hub in Buenos Aires and the second busiest airport.

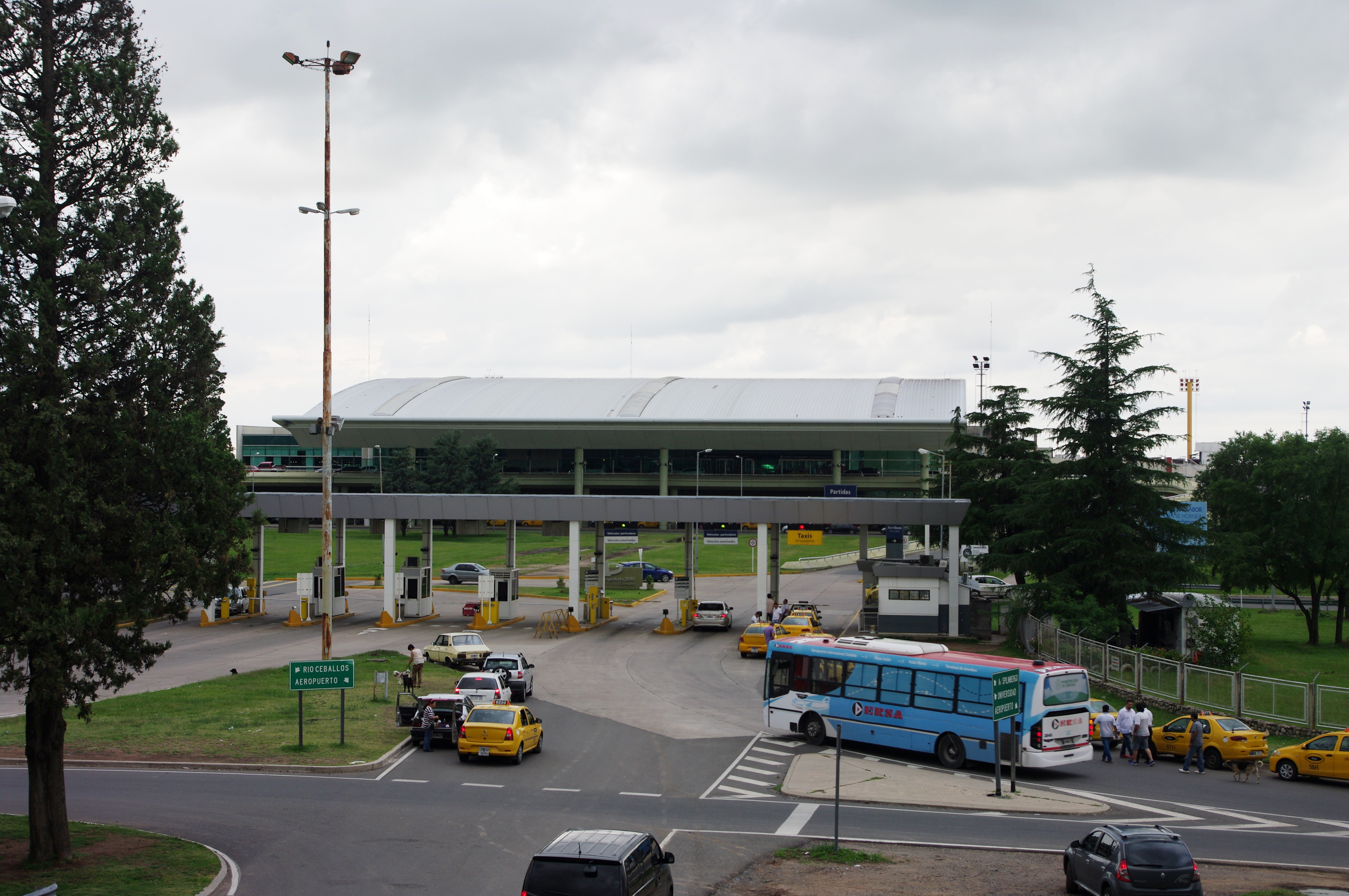
Ambrosio Taravella Airport, located in Córdoba, is the third busiest airport in the country and busiest outside Buenos Aires.

== 2024 ==
Rank	Airport	Location	Total passengers	% change	Rank change
1	Aeroparque Jorge Newbery	Buenos Aires	14,890,000	▼4%	Steady
2	Ministro Pistarini International Airport	Buenos Aires	11,077,000	▲7%	Steady
3	Ingeniero Aeronáutico Ambrosio L.V. Taravella International Airport	Córdoba	2,867,000	▼2%	Steady
4	San Carlos de Bariloche Airport	Bariloche	2,371,000	▼7%	Steady
5	Governor Francisco Gabrielli International Airport	Mendoza	2,298,000	▼5%	Steady
6	Cataratas del Iguazú International Airport	Puerto Iguazú	1,502,000	▼3%	Steady
7	Martín Miguel de Güemes International Airport	Salta	1,325,000	▼9%	Steady
8	Ushuaia – Malvinas Argentinas International Airport	Ushuaia	1,148,000	▼4%	Steady
9	Presidente Perón International Airport	Neuquén	1,121,000	▲0%	Steady
10	Comandante Armando Tola International Airport	El Calafate	899,000	▲1%	Steady
11	Teniente General Benjamín Matienzo International Airport	San Miguel de Tucumán	756,000	▼13%	Steady
12	General Enrique Mosconi International Airport	Comodoro Rivadavia	536,000	▼5%	▲1
13	Gobernador Horacio Guzmán International Airport	Jujuy	511,000	▼13%	▼1
14	Islas Malvinas International Airport	Rosario	438,000	▼11%	Steady
15	Posadas Airport	Posadas	325,000	▼20%	Steady

== 2023 ==
Rank	Airport	Location	Total passengers	% change	Rank change
1	Aeroparque Jorge Newbery	Buenos Aires	15,566,000	▲22%	Steady
2	Ministro Pistarini International Airport	Buenos Aires	10,297,000	▲55%	Steady
3	Ingeniero Aeronáutico Ambrosio L.V. Taravella International Airport	Córdoba	2,928,000	▲40%	Steady
4	San Carlos de Bariloche Airport	Bariloche	2,534,000	▲24%	▼1
5	Governor Francisco Gabrielli International Airport	Mendoza	2,404,000	▲40%	▲1
6	Cataratas del Iguazú International Airport	Puerto Iguazú	1,550,000	▲33%	▲1
7	Martín Miguel de Güemes International Airport	Salta	1,460,000	▲22%	▼1
8	Ushuaia – Malvinas Argentinas International Airport	Ushuaia	1,187,000	▲21%	Steady
9	Presidente Perón International Airport	Neuquén	1,126,000	▲29%	Steady
10	Comandante Armando Tola International Airport	El Calafate	892,000	▲24%	Steady
11	Teniente General Benjamín Matienzo International Airport	San Miguel de Tucumán	869,000	▲21%	Steady
12	Gobernador Horacio Guzmán International Airport	Jujuy	589,000	▲32%	▲1
13	General Enrique Mosconi International Airport	Comodoro Rivadavia	567,000	▲27%	▼1
14	Islas Malvinas International Airport	Rosario	493,000	▲36%	Steady
15	Doctor Fernando Piragine Niveyro International Airport	Corrientes	309,000	▲53%	▲2

== 2022 ==
Rank	Airport	Location	Total passengers	% change	Rank change
1	Aeroparque Jorge Newbery	Buenos Aires	12,833,000	▲183%	▲1
2	Ministro Pistarini International Airport	Buenos Aires	6,619,000	▲113%	Steady
3	Ingeniero Aeronáutico Ambrosio L.V. Taravella International Airport	Córdoba	2,108,000	▲201%	▲1
4	San Carlos de Bariloche Airport	Bariloche	1,980,000	▲78%	▼1
5	Governor Francisco Gabrielli International Airport	Mendoza	1,733,000	▲160%	Steady
6	Martín Miguel de Güemes International Airport	Salta	1,205,000	▲137%	▲1
7	Cataratas del Iguazú International Airport	Puerto Iguazú	1,170,000	▲185%	▲1
8	Ushuaia – Malvinas Argentinas International Airport	Ushuaia	979,000	▲92%	▼2
9	Presidente Perón International Airport	Neuquén	875,000	▲128%	Steady
10	Comandante Armando Tola International Airport	El Calafate	772,000	▲120%	Steady
11	Teniente General Benjamín Matienzo International Airport	San Miguel de Tucumán	718,000	▲125%	Steady
12	General Enrique Mosconi International Airport	Comodoro Rivadavia	453,000	▲153%	Steady
13	Gobernador Horacio Guzmán International Airport	Jujuy	450,000	▲158%	Steady
14	Islas Malvinas International Airport	Rosario	370,000	▲268%	▲4
15	Almirante Marcos A. Zar Airport	Trelew	304,000	▲83%	▲3

== 2021 ==
Rank	Airport	Location	Total passengers	% change	Rank change
1	Aeroparque Jorge Newbery	Buenos Aires	4,518,000	▲92%	▲1
2	Ministro Pistarini International Airport	Buenos Aires	3,101,000	▼11%	Steady
3	San Carlos de Bariloche Airport	Bariloche	1,112,000	▲135%	▲2
4	Ingeniero Aeronáutico Ambrosio L.V. Taravella International Airport	Córdoba	702,000	▼5%	▼1
5	Governor Francisco Gabrielli International Airport	Mendoza	665,000	▼39%	0
6	Ushuaia – Malvinas Argentinas International Airport	Ushuaia	512,000	▲65%	▲3
7	Martín Miguel de Güemes International Airport	Salta	454,000	▲35%	▲3
8	Cataratas del Iguazú International Airport	Puerto Iguazú	401,000	▲13%	▲1
9	Presidente Perón International Airport	Neuquén	384,000	▼52%	▲1
10	Comandante Armando Tola International Airport	El Calafate	327,000	▲42%	Steady
11	Teniente General Benjamín Matienzo International Airport	San Miguel de Tucumán	316,000	▲56%	Steady
12	General Enrique Mosconi International Airport	Comodoro Rivadavia	179,000	▲33%	▲2
13	Gobernador Horacio Guzmán International Airport	Jujuy	172,000	▲101%	▲5
14	Almirante Marcos A. Ziar Airport	Trelew	167,000	▲91%	▲4
15	Libertador General Jose de San Martin International Airport	Posadas	140,000	▲117%	▲4

== 2020 ==
Rank	Airport	Location	Total passengers	% change	Rank change
1	Ministro Pistarini International Airport	Buenos Aires	3,305,171	▼74%	Steady
2	Aeroparque Jorge Newbery	Buenos Aires	2,347,332	▼81%	Steady
3	Ingeniero Aeronáutico Ambrosio L.V. Taravella International Airport	Córdoba	740,984	▼79%	Steady
4	Governor Francisco Gabrielli International Airport	Mendoza	476,921	▼80%	▼1
5	San Carlos de Bariloche Airport	Bariloche	468,424	▼75%	Steady
6	El Palomar Airport	Buenos Aires	412,213	▼73%	Steady
7	Cataratas del Iguazú International Airport	Puerto Iguazú	354,421	▼77%	Steady
8	Martín Miguel de Güemes International Airport	Salta	335,906	▼76%	Steady
9	Ushuaia – Malvinas Argentinas International Airport	Ushuaia	310,477	▼67%	Steady
10	Presidente Perón International Airport	Neuquén	250,875	▼79%	▲1
11	Comandante Armando Tola International Airport	El Calafate	230,162	▼66%	▼1
12	Teniente General Benjamín Matienzo International Airport	San Miguel de Tucumán	202,356	▼79%	Steady
13	Islas Malvinas International Airport	Rosario	167,241	▼78%	Steady
14	General Enrique Mosconi International Airport	Comodoro Rivadavia	134,709	▼79%	▲1
15	Astor Piazzolla International Airport	Mar del Plata	112,123	▼70%	▼1

== 2019 ==
Rank	Airport	Location	Total passengers	% change	Rank change
1	Ministro Pistarini International Airport	Buenos Aires	12,676,000	▲13%	▲1
2	Aeroparque Jorge Newbery	Buenos Aires	12,282,000	▼8%	▼1
3	Ingeniero Aeronáutico Ambrosio L.V. Taravella International Airport	Córdoba	3,485,000	▲4%	Steady
4	Governor Francisco Gabrielli International Airport	Mendoza	2,321,000	▲15%	Steady
5	San Carlos de Bariloche Airport	Bariloche	1,848,000	▲20%	Steady
6	El Palomar Airport	Buenos Aires	1,760,000	▲142%	▲7
7	Cataratas del Iguazú International Airport	Puerto Iguazú	1,560,000	▲42%	Steady
8	Martín Miguel de Güemes International Airport	Salta	1,431,000	▲29%	▼2
9	Presidente Perón International Airport	Neuquén	1,204,000	▲19%	▼1
10	Teniente General Benjamín Matienzo International Airport	San Miguel de Tucumán	968,000	▲3%	▼1
11	Ushuaia – Malvinas Argentinas International Airport	Ushuaia	928,000	▲17%	Steady
12	Rosario – Islas Malvinas International Airport	Rosario	760,000	▼12%	▼2
14	Comandante Armando Tola International Airport	El Calafate	675,000	▲13%	▲1
13	General Enrique Mosconi International Airport	Comodoro Rivadavia	643,000	▼5%	▼2
15	Gobernador Horacio Guzmán International Airport	Jujuy	388,000	▼2%	▲1

== 2018 ==
Rank	Airport	Location	Total passengers	% change	Rank change
1	Aeroparque Jorge Newbery	Buenos Aires	13,363,000	▼3%	Steady
2	Ministro Pistarini International Airport	Buenos Aires	11,204,000	▲9%	Steady
3	Ingeniero Aeronáutico Ambrosio L.V. Taravella International Airport	Córdoba	3'388,000	▲19%	Steady
4	Governor Francisco Gabrielli International Airport	Mendoza	2'032,000	▲16%	Steady
5	San Carlos de Bariloche Airport	Bariloche	1'559,000	▲22%	Steady
6	Martín Miguel de Güemes International Airport	Salta	1'111,000	▲3%	Steady
7	Cataratas del Iguazú International Airport	Puerto Iguazú	1'089,000	▲9%	Steady
8	Presidente Perón International Airport	Neuquén	1'019,000	▲18%	Steady
9	Teniente General Benjamín Matienzo International Airport	San Miguel de Tucumán	933,000	▲68%	▲4
10	Rosario – Islas Malvinas International Airport	Rosario	848,000	▲16%	Steady
11	Ushuaia – Malvinas Argentinas International Airport	Ushuaia	794,000	▼1%	▼2
12	General Enrique Mosconi International Airport	Comodoro Rivadavia	673,000	▲9%	Steady
13	El Palomar Airport	Buenos Aires	658,000	▲	▲
14	Comandante Armando Tola International Airport	El Calafate	598,000	▼1%	▼3
15	Astor Piazzolla International Airport	Mar del Plata	453,000	▲62%	▲2

== 2017 ==
Rank	Airport	Location	Total passengers	% change	Rank change
1	Aeroparque Jorge Newbery	Buenos Aires	13,769,000	▲19%	Steady
2	Ministro Pistarini International Airport	Buenos Aires	10,323,000	▲2%	Steady
3	Ingeniero Aeronáutico Ambrosio L.V. Taravella International Airport	Córdoba	2,892,000	▲30%	Steady
4	Governor Francisco Gabrielli International Airport	Mendoza	1,810,000	▲61%	▲1
5	San Carlos de Bariloche Airport	Bariloche	1,304,000	▲14%	▼1
6	Martín Miguel de Güemes International Airport	Salta	1,150,000	▲17%	Steady
7	Cataratas del Iguazú International Airport	Puerto Iguazú	1,000,000	▲12%	Steady
8	Presidente Perón International Airport	Neuquén	946,000	▲11%	Steady
9	Ushuaia – Malvinas Argentinas International Airport	Ushuaia	812,000	▲6%	Steady
10	Rosario – Islas Malvinas International Airport	Rosario	773,000	▲41%	▲3
11	Comandante Armando Tola International Airport	El Calafate	646,000	▼4%	▼1
12	General Enrique Mosconi International Airport	Comodoro Rivadavia	625,000	▲9%	Steady
13	Teniente General Benjamín Matienzo International Airport	San Miguel de Tucumán	565,000	▼14%^{a}	▼2
14	Comandante Espora Airport	Bahía Blanca	439,000	▲44%	Steady
15	Almirante Marcos A. Zar Airport	Trelew	344,000	▲32%	Steady

Notes:

- ^a : Some of the airports were closed for repairs during 2017, such as TUC and SFN, while others absorbed the traffic from them, such as RHD and PRA.

== 2016 ==
Rank	Airport	Location	Total passengers	% change	Rank change
1	Aeroparque Jorge Newbery	Buenos Aires	11,612,000	▲6%	Steady
2	Ministro Pistarini International Airport	Buenos Aires	10,074,000	▲7%	Steady
3	Ingeniero Aeronáutico Ambrosio L.V. Taravella International Airport	Córdoba	2,232,000	▲13%	Steady
4	San Carlos de Bariloche Airport	Bariloche	1,143,000	▲33%	▲2
5	Governor Francisco Gabrielli International Airport	Mendoza	1,126,000	▼19%	▼1
6	Martín Miguel de Güemes International Airport	Salta	983,000	▲17%	▲1
7	Cataratas del Iguazú International Airport	Puerto Iguazú	894,000	▲3%	▼2
8	Presidente Perón International Airport	Neuquén	855,000	▲5%	Steady
9	Ushuaia – Malvinas Argentinas International Airport	Ushuaia	768,000	▲10%	Steady
10	Comandante Armando Tola International Airport	El Calafate	673,000	▼3%	Steady
11	Teniente General Benjamín Matienzo International Airport	San Miguel de Tucumán	658,000	▲12%	Steady
12	General Enrique Mosconi International Airport	Comodoro Rivadavia	573,000	▼2%	Steady
13	Rosario – Islas Malvinas International Airport	Rosario	550,000	▲34%	Steady
14	Comandante Espora Airport	Bahía Blanca	304,000	▼4%	Steady
15	Almirante Marcos A. Zar Airport	Trelew	260,000	▼4%	Steady
