= Ezeiza International Airport =

International airport serving Buenos Aires, Argentina

Ministro Pistarini International Airport Aeropuerto Internacional Ministro Pistarini Aeropuerto Internacional de Ezeiza

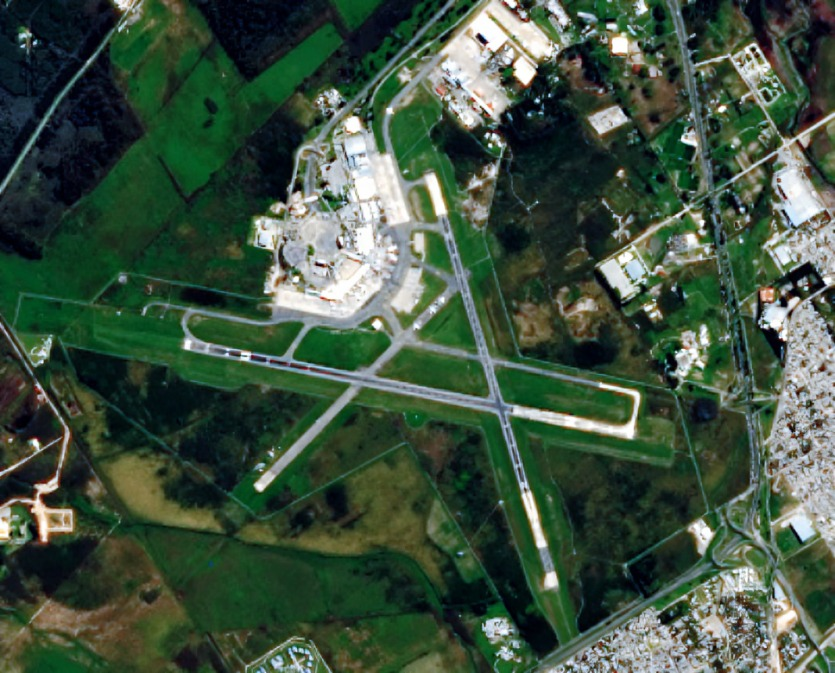
- Satellite view of the airport in 2016
- IATA: EZE; ICAO: SAEZ; WMO: 87576

Summary
- Airport type: Public
- Owner/Operator: Aeropuertos Argentina 2000
- Serves: Buenos Aires metropolitan area
- Location: Ezeiza, Argentina
- Opened: 30 April 1949; 77 years ago
- Hub for: Aerolíneas Argentinas; Flybondi
- Time zone: Argentina Standard Time (UTC−03:00)
- Elevation AMSL: 67 ft (20 m)
- Coordinates: 34°49′20″S 58°32′09″W
- Website: www.aa2000.com.ar/en/EZE

Map
- Location in greater Buenos Aires EZE (Argentina) EZE (South America)

Runways
Direction	Length		Surface
Direction	m	ft	Surface
11/29	3,300	10,828	Asphalt
17/35	3,105	10,187	Asphalt

Statistics (2024)
- Total passengers: 11,077,000
- Ranking in Argentina: 2nd
- Freight (tonnes): 229,260
- Sources: AIP, ANAC, EANA, ORSNA, WorldAeroData, Empresa Argentina de Navegación Aérea statistics for 2018

Ministro Pistarini International Airport (Spanish: Aeropuerto Internacional Ministro Pistarini) (IATA: EZE, ICAO: SAEZ), commonly known as Ezeiza International Airport, is an international airport located in Ezeiza, 22 kilometres (14 mi) south-southwest of Buenos Aires, Argentina.

It is the main international gateway for the Buenos Aires metropolitan area, handling 85% of the country's international air traffic, while the inner-city Aeroparque Jorge Newbery primarily serves domestic and regional routes.

Ezeiza serves as a major hub for international and select domestic flights of Aerolíneas Argentinas. Covering 3,475 hectares (13.42 sq mi; 8,590 acres), the airport has been operated by Aeropuertos Argentina 2000 S.A. since 1998.

== History ==
The airport is named after Juan Pistarini, Minister of Public Works during the presidency of Juan Perón, who placed the cornerstone of the project on 22 December 1945. It was designed and erected by Argentine technicians. Its construction, which took four years to be completed, was one of the major projects in the five-year plan of the first presidency of Juan Perón. The airport was inaugurated on 30 April 1949. When it opened it was the third-largest airport in the world. A 1949 diagram shows three runways crossing at 60-degree angles: 9,353 feet (2,851 m) runway 10/28, 7,220 feet (2,200 m) 4/22 and 6,892 feet (2,101 m) 16/34.

== Operations ==
In October 2012, Ezeiza Airport recorded the highest annual traffic growth of all the airports operated by Aeropuertos Argentina 2000. For this month, the airport handled 767,824 passengers, a 10.9% increase compared to the previous October; the volume of international and domestic traffic for October 2012 increased 8.7% and 108.3%, respectively, year-on-year. Overall, 2012 traffic figures for the airport indicated a 7.3% increase over the previous year. Figures for July 2013 showed that the airport handled 688,397 passengers, an 8.9% decrease over the previous year.

== Terminals ==
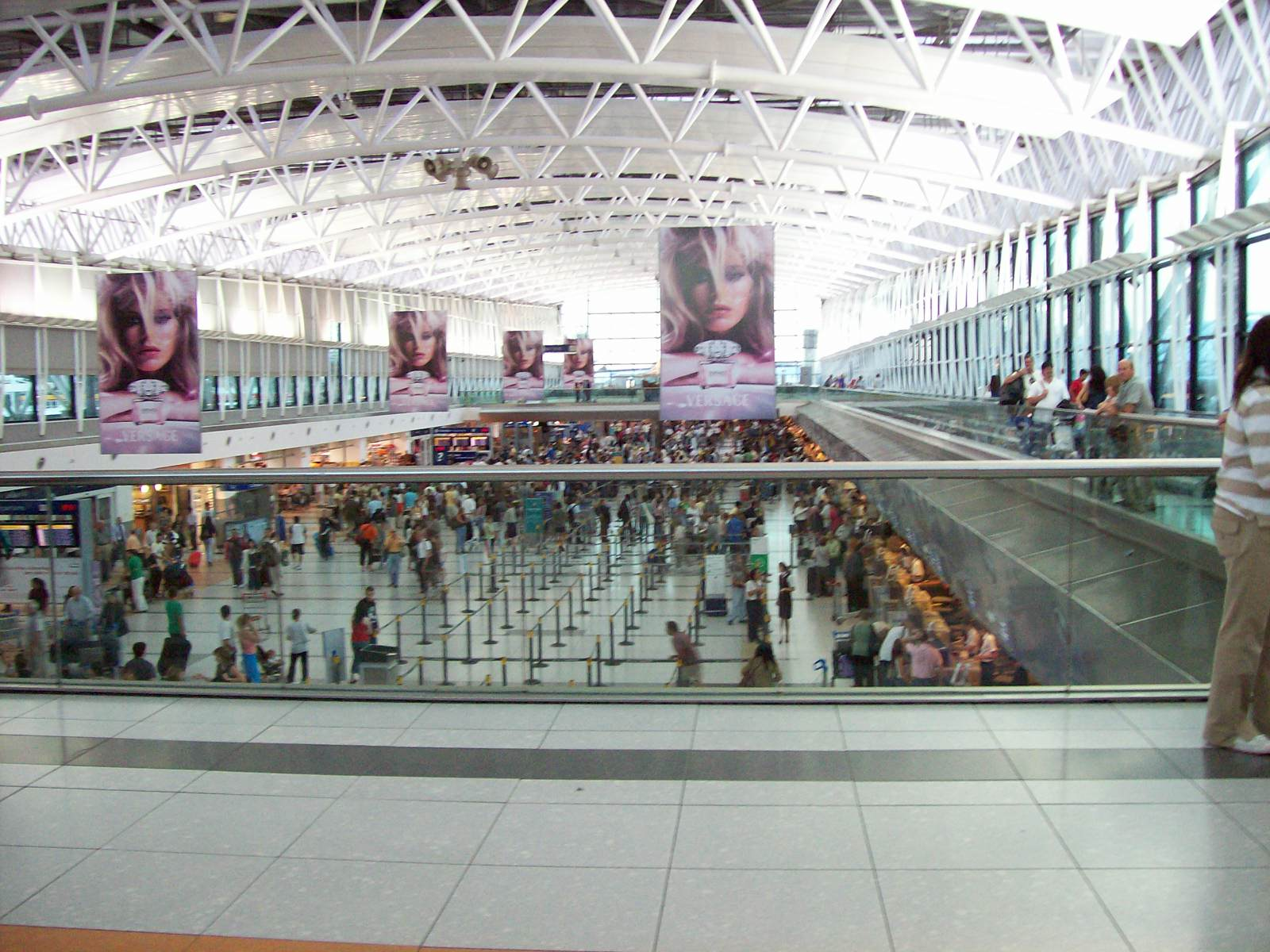
Ministro Pistarini International Airport, Terminal A

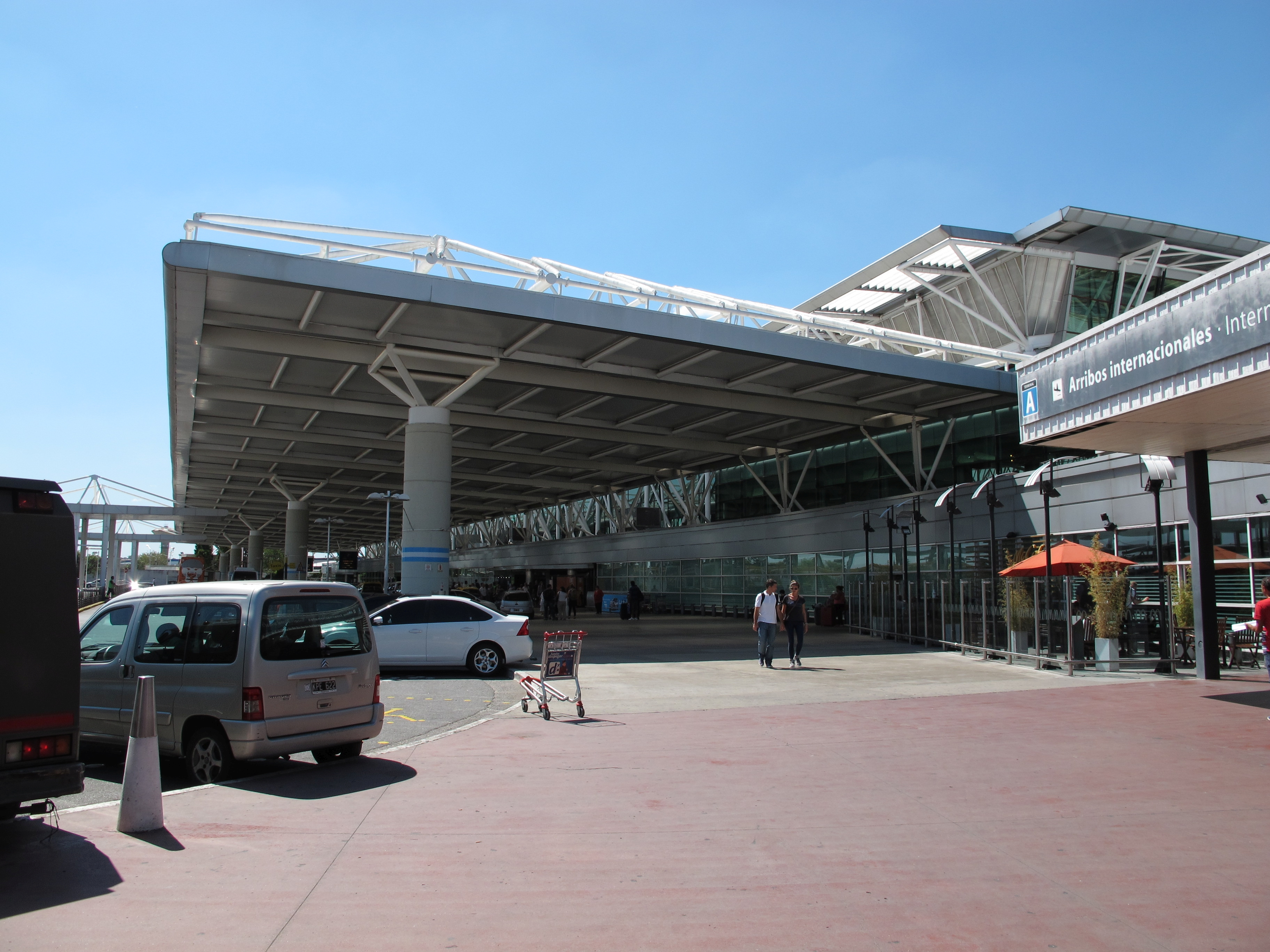
Buenos Aires-Ezeiza Ministro Pistarini International Airport Terminal A

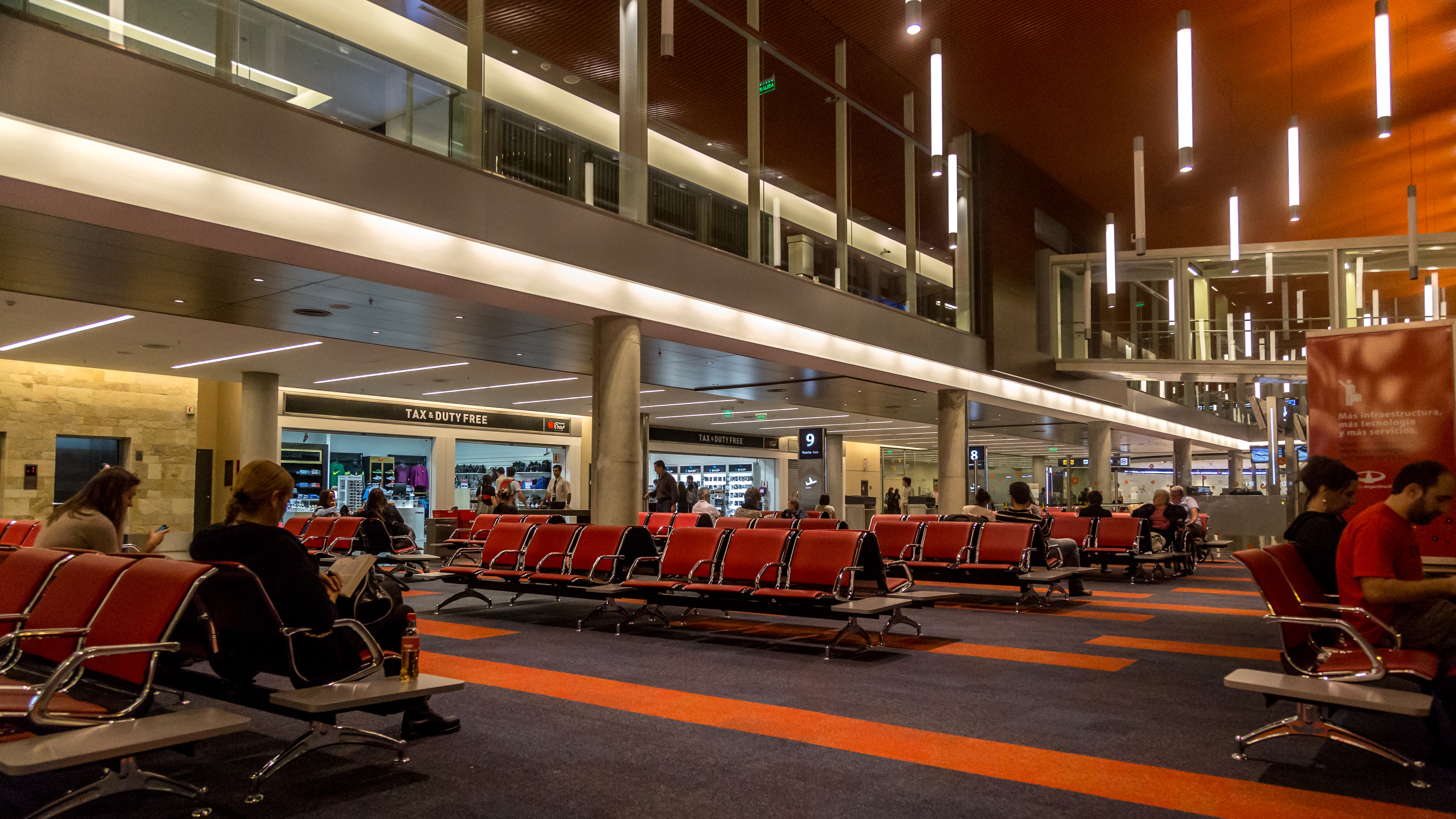
Terminal B

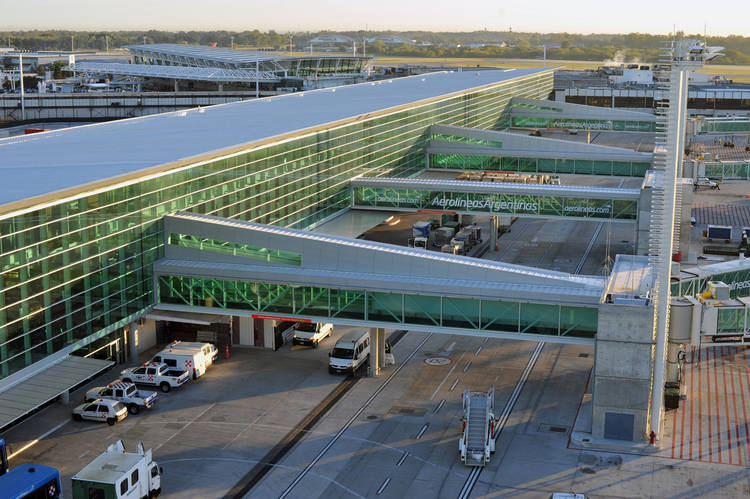
Airport terminal A in 2013

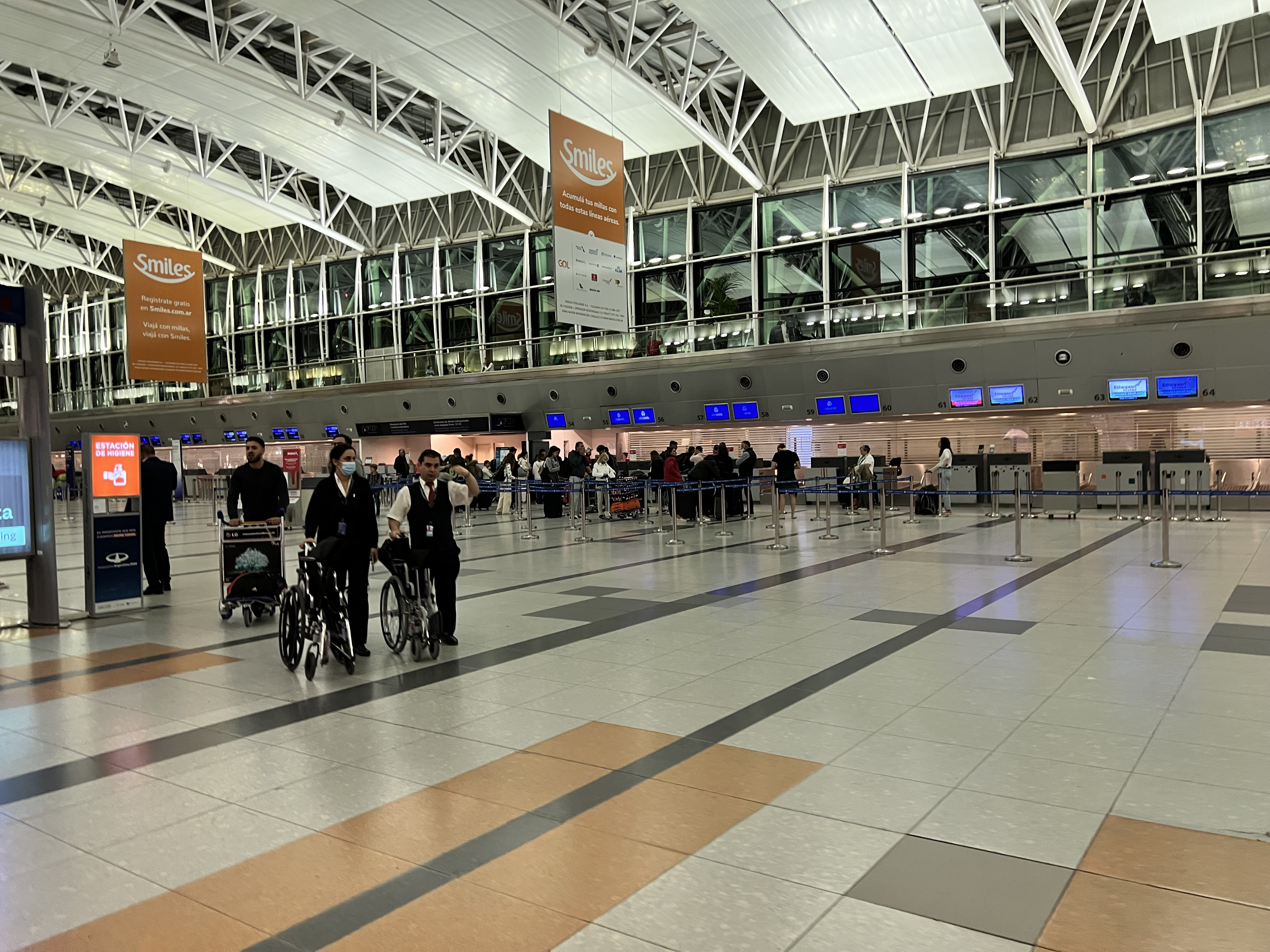
Check-in counters at Terminal A

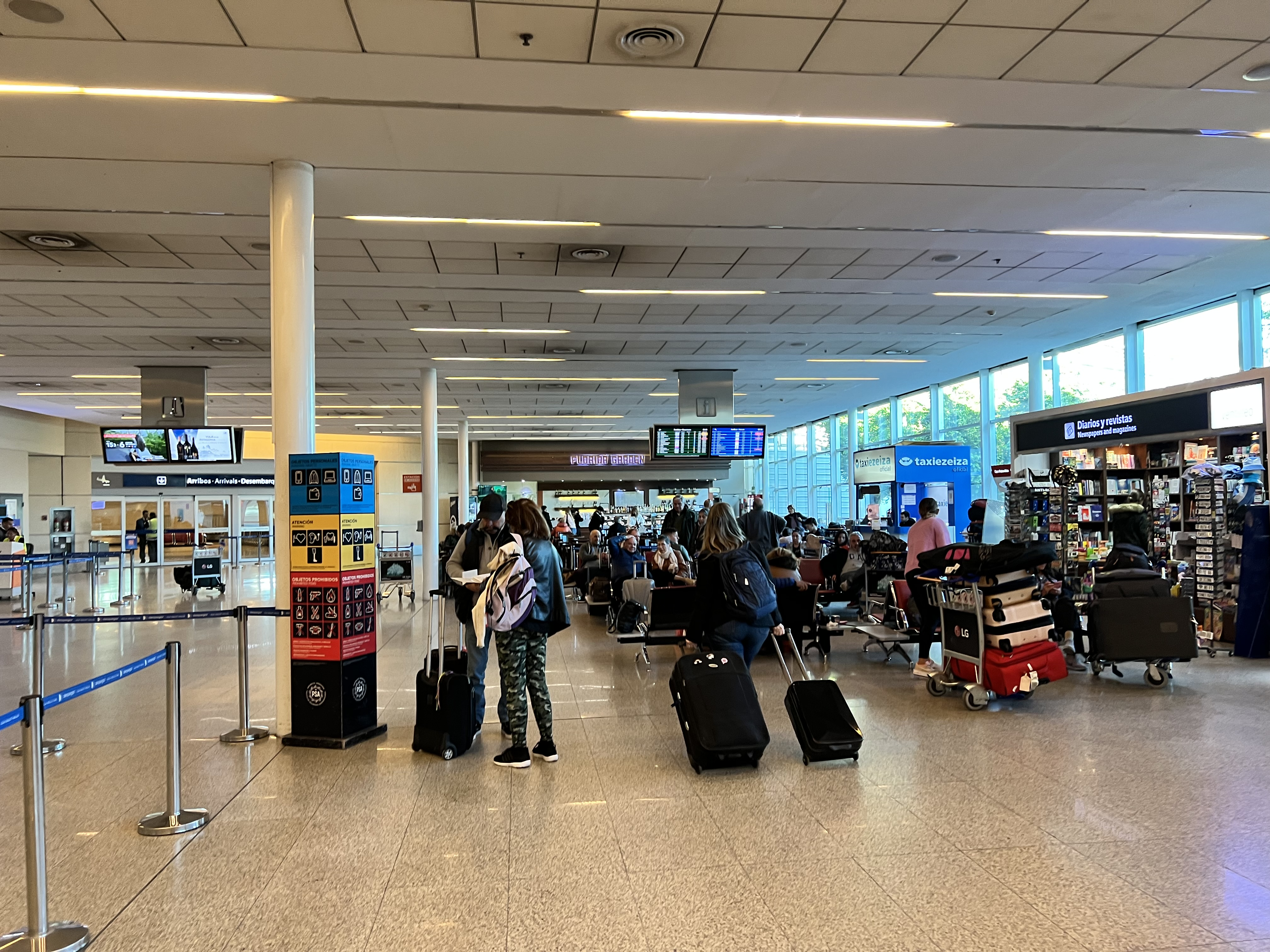
Arrivals area at Terminal C

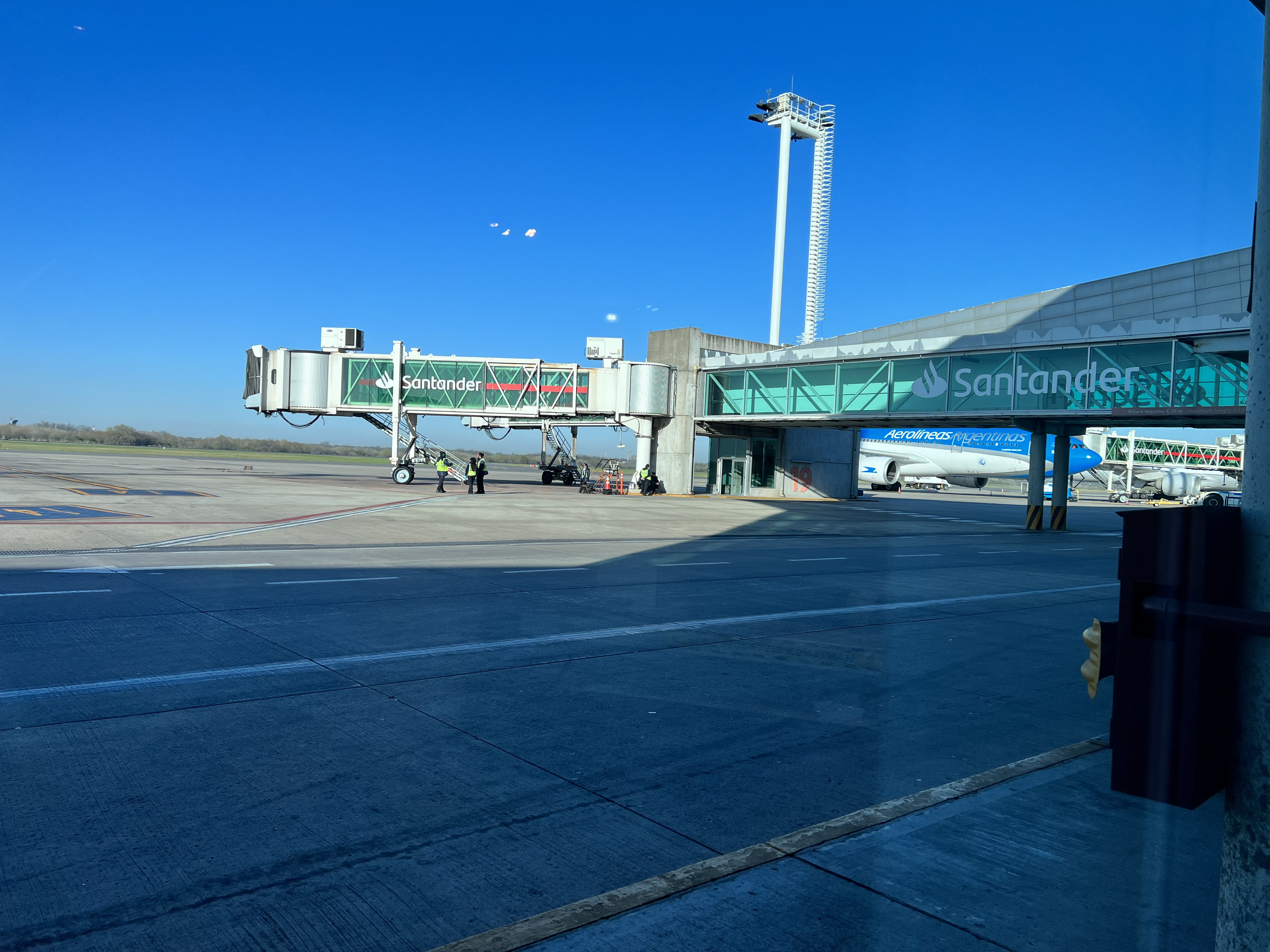
Terminal C

Terminal C was inaugurated in July 2011; as of December 2011, its facilities were in use by Aerolíneas Argentinas, Air France, and Alitalia for their operations.

In March 2013, terminal B, with an area of 28,795 square metres (309,950 sq ft), was inaugurated, for use by Aerolíneas Argentinas and KLM.

On April 14, 2023, the new Departures Terminal (Terminal de Partidas) was inaugurated. The new terminal features 50,000 square meters (538,195 sq ft) of open surface over 4 floors, with a projected capacity of 30 million passengers per year. The old Terminal A became the new International Arrivals Terminal and the old Terminal C became the new Domestic Arrivals Terminal.

== Transportation ==
The airport has bus connections to central Buenos Aires and Retiro bus station in Puerto Madero, and local bus (Colectivo). There are no trains.

== Airlines and destinations ==
=== Passenger ===
Airlines	Destinations
Aerolíneas Argentinas	Cancún, El Calafate, Madrid, Mendoza, Miami, Puerto Iguazu, Punta Cana, Rome–Fiumicino, San Salvador de Jujuy, Ushuaia; Seasonal: Aruba, Curaçao (begins 2 January 2027), Rio de Janeiro–Galeão, San Carlos de Bariloche, Tucumán
Aeroméxico	Mexico City–Benito Juárez
Air Canada	São Paulo–Guarulhos, Toronto–Pearson
Air Europa	Madrid
Air France	Paris–Charles de Gaulle
American Airlines	Miami, New York–JFK; Seasonal: Dallas/Fort Worth
Andes Líneas Aéreas	Seasonal charter: Cabo Frio, Florianópolis, Porto Seguro, Recife
Arajet	Punta Cana, Santo Domingo–Las Américas
Avianca	Bogotá, Medellín–JMC (ends 1 December 2026)
Avianca Costa Rica	Bogotá, San José (CR)
Avianca Ecuador	Bogotá, Guayaquil, Quito
Boliviana de Aviación	Cochabamba, Santa Cruz de la Sierra–Viru Viru
British Airways	London–Heathrow, Rio de Janeiro–Galeão (ends 28 March 2027), Santiago de Chile (begins 29 March 2027)
China Eastern Airlines	Auckland, Shanghai–Pudong
Copa Airlines	Panama City–Tocumen
Delta Air Lines	Atlanta; Seasonal: New York–JFK
El Al	Tel Aviv (begins 29 November 2026)
Emirates	Dubai–International, Rio de Janeiro–Galeão
Ethiopian Airlines	Addis Ababa, São Paulo–Guarulhos
Gol Linhas Aéreas	Florianópolis, João Pessoa, Maceió, Rio de Janeiro–Galeão; Seasonal: Fortaleza, Porto Seguro
Iberia	Madrid
ITA Airways	Rome–Fiumicino
JetSmart Argentina	Comodoro Rivadavia, Córdoba (AR), El Calafate, Florianópolis, Lima, Maceió (begins 3 December 2026), Mendoza, Natal, Neuquén, Puerto Iguazú, Recife, Rio de Janeiro–Galeão, Salta, San Carlos de Bariloche, San Martín de los Andes, San Miguel de Tucumán, Santiago de Chile, Trelew, Ushuaia; Seasonal: Porto Seguro (begins 5 January 2027)
JetSmart Chile	Santiago de Chile
JetSmart Colombia	Medellín–JMC
KLM	Amsterdam, Santiago de Chile
LATAM Brasil	Rio de Janeiro–Galeão, São Paulo–Guarulhos; Seasonal: Florianópolis, Maceió (begins 15 December 2026), Natal (begins 15 December 2026), Recife
LATAM Chile	Florianópolis, Miami, Santiago de Chile
LATAM Perú	Lima
Lufthansa	Frankfurt
Sky Airline	Salvador da Bahia, Santiago de Chile
Sky Airline Peru	Lima
Swiss International Air Lines	São Paulo–Guarulhos, Zurich
Turkish Airlines	Istanbul, São Paulo–Guarulhos
United Airlines	Houston–Intercontinental

=== Route development ===
Qantas withdrew its service to the airport in favour of Santiago in March 2012; flights to Ezeiza Airport had begun in November 2008. This followed Malaysia Airlines' termination of its Boeing 747-served Kuala Lumpur–Cape Town–Buenos Aires route in early 2012 to cut costs. Aerolíneas Argentinas discontinued the Auckland stopover on the Buenos Aires–Sydney run in July 2012; Sydney was removed from the airline's network in April 2014. South African Airways discontinued its Johannesburg–Buenos Aires service in March 2014.

In June 2010, Qatar Airways launched direct flights between the airport and Doha, but in August 2020 cancelled the route. After a ten-year gap, KLM resumed operations at the airport in October 2011. Emirates launched services to the airport in January 2012, but in August 2020 discontinued the route. Turkish Airlines extended its Istanbul–São Paulo service to end at Ezeiza in December 2012. Air New Zealand started non-stop flights between the airport and Auckland in December 2015, but discontinued them in 2020. United Airlines cancelled non-stop flights from Newark, New Jersey, in October 2019.

In January 2018, Aerolineas Argentinas cancelled the non-stop flight to Barcelona. Later, low-cost carriers LEVEL and Norwegian started long-haul flights to Ezeiza airport from Barcelona and London-Gatwick, respectively. The Norwegian carrier discontinued the route in April 2020. Ethiopian Airlines and Swiss carrier Edelweiss Air launched new flights to Buenos Aires. Aerolíneas Argentinas started flights to Orlando in December 2019, but in March 2020 the route was discontinued. LATAM Argentina ended its operations in June 2020 and discontinued routes to Miami and Brazil. In July 2020, American Airlines discontinued its Los Angeles route.

== Statistics ==
Traffic by calendar year. Official ACI statistics.
	Passengers	Change from previous year	Aircraft operations	Change from previous year	Cargo (metric tons)	Change from previous year
2005	6,365,989	▲14.34%	62,048	▲6.10%	177,358	▲1.41%
2006	6,867,596	▲7.88%	63,693	▲2.65%	187,415	▲5.67%
2007	7,487,779	▲9.03%	70,576	▲10.81%	204,909	▲9.33%
2008	8,012,794	▲7.01%	71,037	▲0.65%	205,506	▲0.29%
2009	7,910,048	▼1.28%	67,488	▼5.00%	162,806	▼20.78%
2010	8,786,807	▲11.08%	65,063	▼3.59%	212,890	▲30.96%
Source: Airports Council International. World Airport Traffic Statistics (Years 2005–2010)

Busiest international routes from and to Ezeiza (2017)
Rank	City	Passengers
1	Santiago, Chile	1,130,000
2	Miami, USA	1,001,000
3	Lima, Peru	896,000
4	Madrid, Spain	815,000
5	São Paulo, Brazil	739,000
6	Rio de Janeiro, Brazil	654,000
7	Bogotá, Colombia	372,000
8	Rome, Italy	332,000
9	New York City	329,000
10	Panama City, Panama	275,000

== Accidents and incidents ==
As of August 2011, Aviation Safety Network recorded 30 accidents/incidents for aircraft that departed from the airport or had it as a destination. The list below provides a summary of the fatal events that took place at or in the vicinity of the airport.

- 23 October 1996: Argentine Air Force Flight 5025, a Boeing 707-320C, registration LV-LGP, was operating a cargo service when it struck the ground short of the runway on final approach to Ezeiza inbound from Arturo Merino Benítez International Airport in Santiago, Chile. The aircraft broke up and burst into flames. Two occupants of the aircraft died.
- 26 October 2003: CATA Línea Aérea Flight 760, a Fairchild FH-227B, tail number LV-MGV, was operating a nonscheduled Ezeiza–Corrientes freighter service when it encountered technical difficulties shortly after takeoff from Ezeiza Airport. The aircraft attempted a belly landing on a nearby golf course. The aircraft skidded some 200 m before hitting a tree and bursting into flames. All five occupants of the aircraft died in the accident.

== See also ==
- List of airports in Argentina
- List of the busiest airports in Argentina
- Transport in Argentina
