= Flight 46 =

Flight 46 or Flight 046 may refer to:

- Downeast Flight 46, crashed on 30 May 1979
- Austral Líneas Aéreas Flight 046, crashed on 12 June 1988
