= Ingeniero Aeronáutico Ambrosio L.V. Taravella International Airport =

International airport serving Cordoba, Argentina

Ingeniero Aeronáutico Ambrosio L.V. Taravella International Airport Aeropuerto Internacional de Córdoba Ingeniero Aeronáutico Ambrosio L.V. Taravella
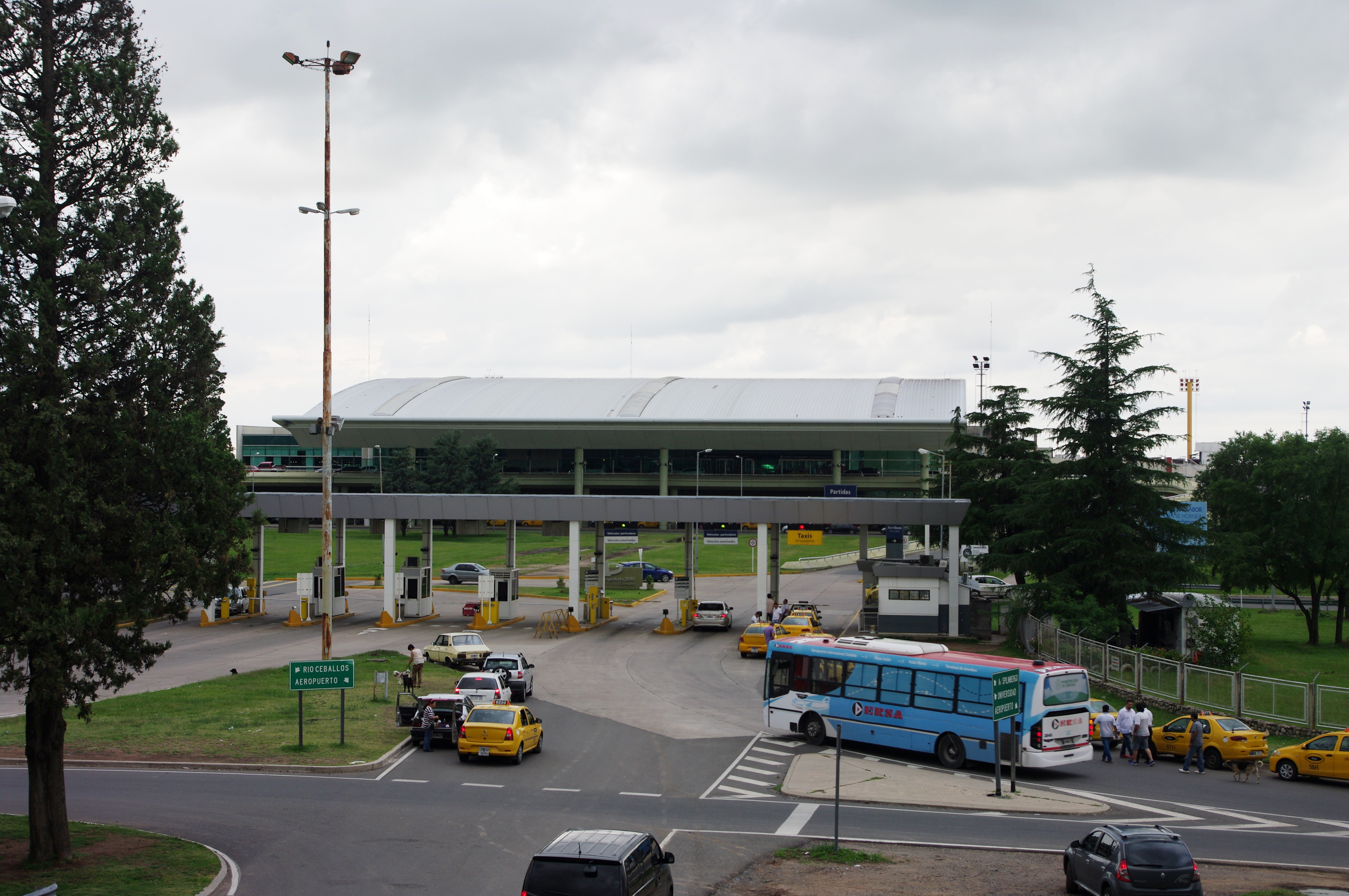
- Main entrance
- IATA: COR; ICAO: SACO; WMO: 87344

Summary
- Airport type: Public
- Operator: Aeropuertos Argentina 2000 S.A.
- Serves: Córdoba
- Location: Córdoba, Córdoba Province, Argentina
- Elevation AMSL: 489 m (1,604 ft)
- Coordinates: 31°18′36″S 64°12′30″W
- Website: Aeropuertos Argentina 2000

Map
- Location of the airport in Argentina

Runways
Direction	Length		Surface
Direction	m	ft	Surface
18/36	3,200	10,498	Concrete
05/23	2,280	7,480	Asphalt

Statistics (2017)
- Total passengers: 2,901,691
- Sources: Argentinian AIP, ORSNA

Ingeniero Aeronáutico Ambrosio L.V. Taravella International Airport (Spanish: Aeropuerto Internacional de Córdoba Ingeniero Aeronáutico Ambrosio L.V. Taravella, IATA: COR, ICAO: SACO), more commonly known as Pajas Blancas, is located 9 kilometres (5 nautical miles) north-northwest of the center of Córdoba, the capital city of the Córdoba Province in Argentina. The airport covers an area of 1,020 ha (2,520 acres) and is operated by Aeropuertos Argentina 2000 S.A.

== Overview ==
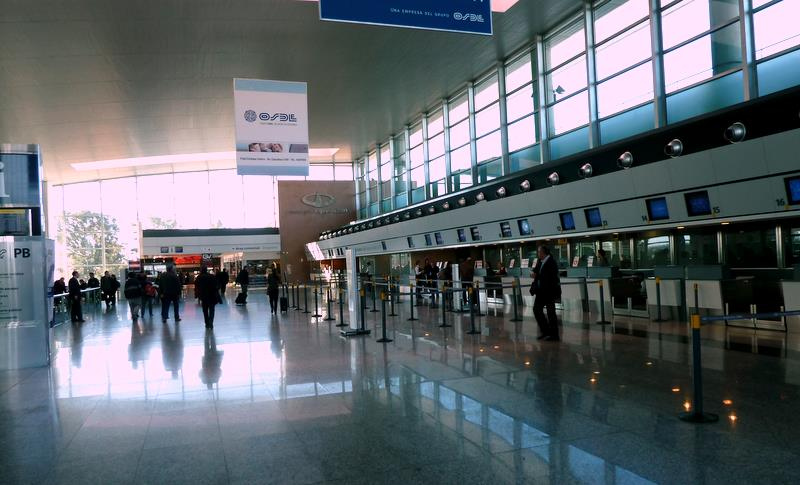
Check-in area

Cordoba is Argentina's third-busiest airport, after Ministro Pistarini International Airport and Aeroparque Jorge Newbery, both of which are located in Buenos Aires.

The airport had been a jetport for a long time, having received commercial jet aircraft services before, but it had been lacking the size to receive larger numbers of passengers until Aeropuertos Argentina 2000, a private company that operates several airports in Argentina, decided to give internal Argentine airports more money so that they could expand and lure more airlines. Up until that moment, the Taravella airport, which was named after an architect, only had one story and one terminal.

The construction of a second and third floor began in 2000, designed by prominent local architect Mario Roberto Álvarez; by 2002, it was finished and Aerolíneas Argentinas decided to make the Taravella airport a hub for domestic flights.

The airport is equipped with the necessary lights to have night air traffic, but pilots flying there, especially pilots of light aircraft, are recommended to look out for birds, as there is quite a substantial number of them inhabiting the areas nearby.

From October 2010 to January 2012, Iberia operated a route to Madrid. Air Europa commenced flights from Córdoba to Madrid via Asunción in December 2016. American Airlines began service to Miami in June 2019. The flight ended the following year.

== Airlines and destinations ==
Airlines	Destinations
Aerolíneas Argentinas	Buenos Aires–Aeroparque, Comodoro Rivadavia, El Calafate, Esquel, Mar del Plata, Mendoza, Miami, Neuquén, Puerto Iguazú, Punta Cana, Posadas, Resistencia, Rio de Janeiro–Galeão, Salta, San Carlos de Bariloche, San Juan (AR), San Salvador de Jujuy, Trelew, Tucumán, Ushuaia; Seasonal: Aruba, Buenos Aires–Ezeiza, Cabo Frio (begins 26 December 2026), Florianópolis, Punta del Este
Air Europa	Madrid
Andes Líneas Aéreas	Seasonal charter: Porto Seguro, Recife
Arajet	Punta Cana
Avianca	Bogotá
Copa Airlines	Panama City–Tocumen
Gol Linhas Aéreas	Recife, Rio de Janeiro–Galeão; Seasonal: Florianópolis, São Paulo–Guarulhos
JetSmart Argentina	Buenos Aires–Aeroparque, Buenos Aires–Ezeiza, Rio de Janeiro–Galeão; Seasonal: Florianópolis (begins 16 December 2026)
JOY Airline	San Salvador de Jujuy
LADE	Mendoza
LATAM Brasil	São Paulo–Guarulhos
LATAM Chile	Santiago de Chile
LATAM Peru	Lima

== See also ==
- List of the busiest airports in Argentina
- Transport in Argentina
