= Cabo Frio International Airport =

Airport serving Cabo Frio, Brazil

Cabo Frio International Airport Aeroporto Internacional de Cabo Frio
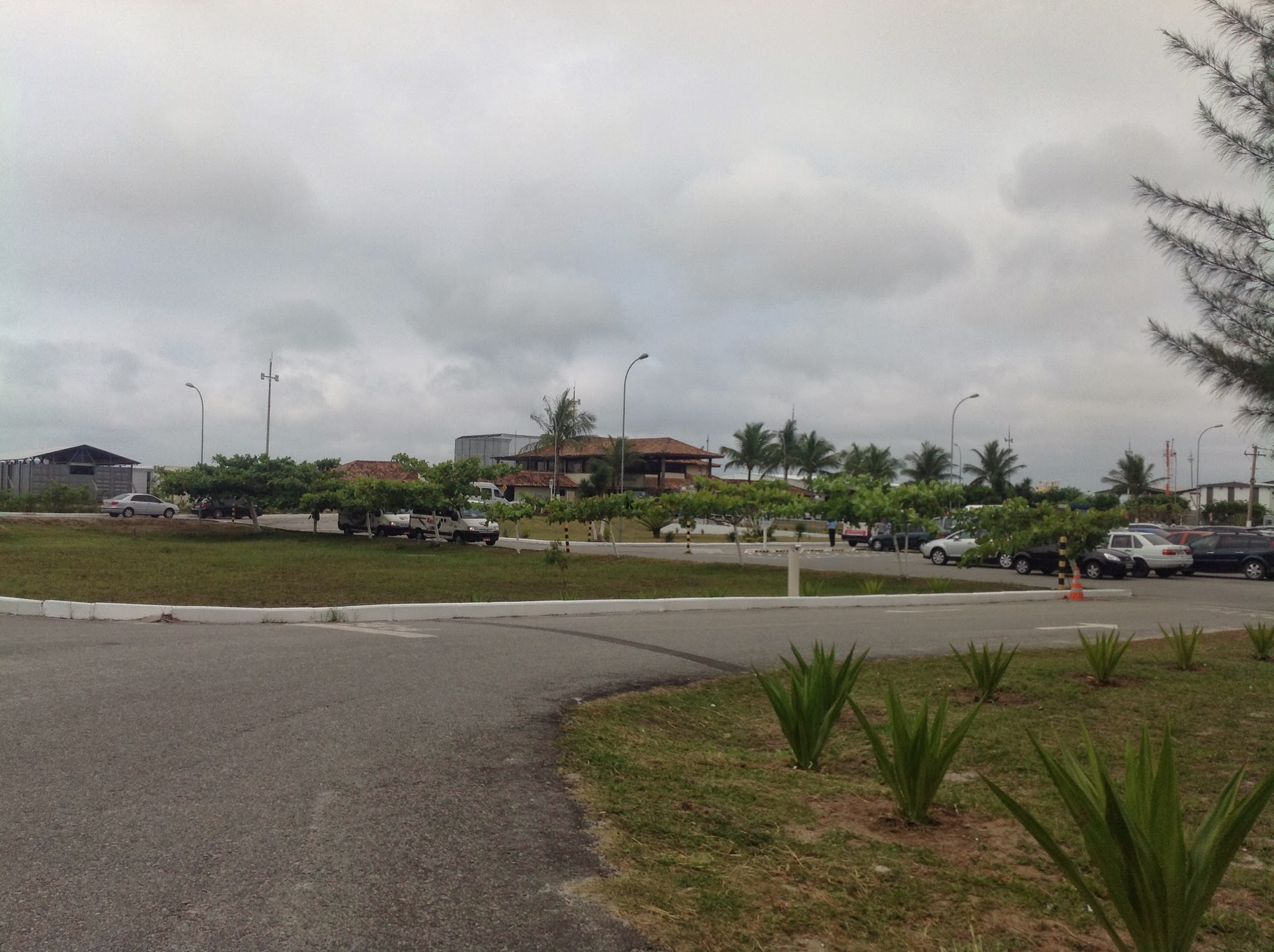
- IATA: CFB; ICAO: SBCB; LID: RJ0003

Summary
- Airport type: Public
- Operator: Cabo Frio (1998–2001); Aeropart (2001–present)
- Serves: Cabo Frio
- Time zone: BRT (UTC−03:00)
- Elevation AMSL: 7 m (23 ft)
- Coordinates: 22°55′15″S 042°04′17″W
- Website: www.cabofrioairport.com.br/en/

Map
- Location in Brazil CFB (Brazil)

Runways
Direction	Length		Surface
Direction	m	ft	Surface
10/28	2,550	8,366	Asphalt

Statistics (2021)
- Passengers: 38,512 ▲5%
- Statistics: Aviação Brasil; Sources: Airport Website, ANAC, DECEA

Cabo Frio International Airport (IATA: CFB, ICAO: SBCB) is the airport serving Cabo Frio, Brazil.

The airport is operated by Aeropart.

== History ==
The airport was built by the government of the state of Rio de Janeiro in partnership with the Brazilian Air Force. It was inaugurated in 1998 as a facility specialized in cargo transportation.

In September 2007 the first enlargement was completed, including a new terminal and enlargements of the runway and apron.

In June 2010 the second phase of enlargement works was inaugurated, including access roads, enlargement of the cargo terminal, apron, new administration offices and a dedicated terminal for Petrobras to operate flights to its offshore oil platforms of the Campos basin.

Since October 3, 2011 the airport is administrated by the private company Libra Aeroportos, using the name Costa do Sol Operadora Aeroportuária, as a concession from the Municipality of Cabo Frio.

During holidays the airport often receives charter flights from Argentina, Chile, and Uruguay.

== Airlines and destinations ==
Airlines	Destinations
Aerolíneas Argentinas	Seasonal: Buenos Aires–Aeroparque, Córdoba (AR) (begins 26 December 2026); Seasonal charter: Rosario
Andes Líneas Aéreas	Seasonal charter: Buenos Aires–Ezeiza
Azul Brazilian Airlines	Seasonal: Belo Horizonte–Confins
LATAM Brasil	São Paulo–Guarulhos (begins 3 December 2026)

== Access ==
The airport is located 8 km (5 mi) from downtown Cabo Frio and 10 km (6 mi) from Arraial do Cabo.

== See also ==
- List of airports in Brazil
