= San Carlos de Bariloche Airport =

International airport serving San Carlos de Bariloche, Rio Negro, Argentina

San Carlos de Bariloche Airport Aeropuerto de San Carlos de Bariloche
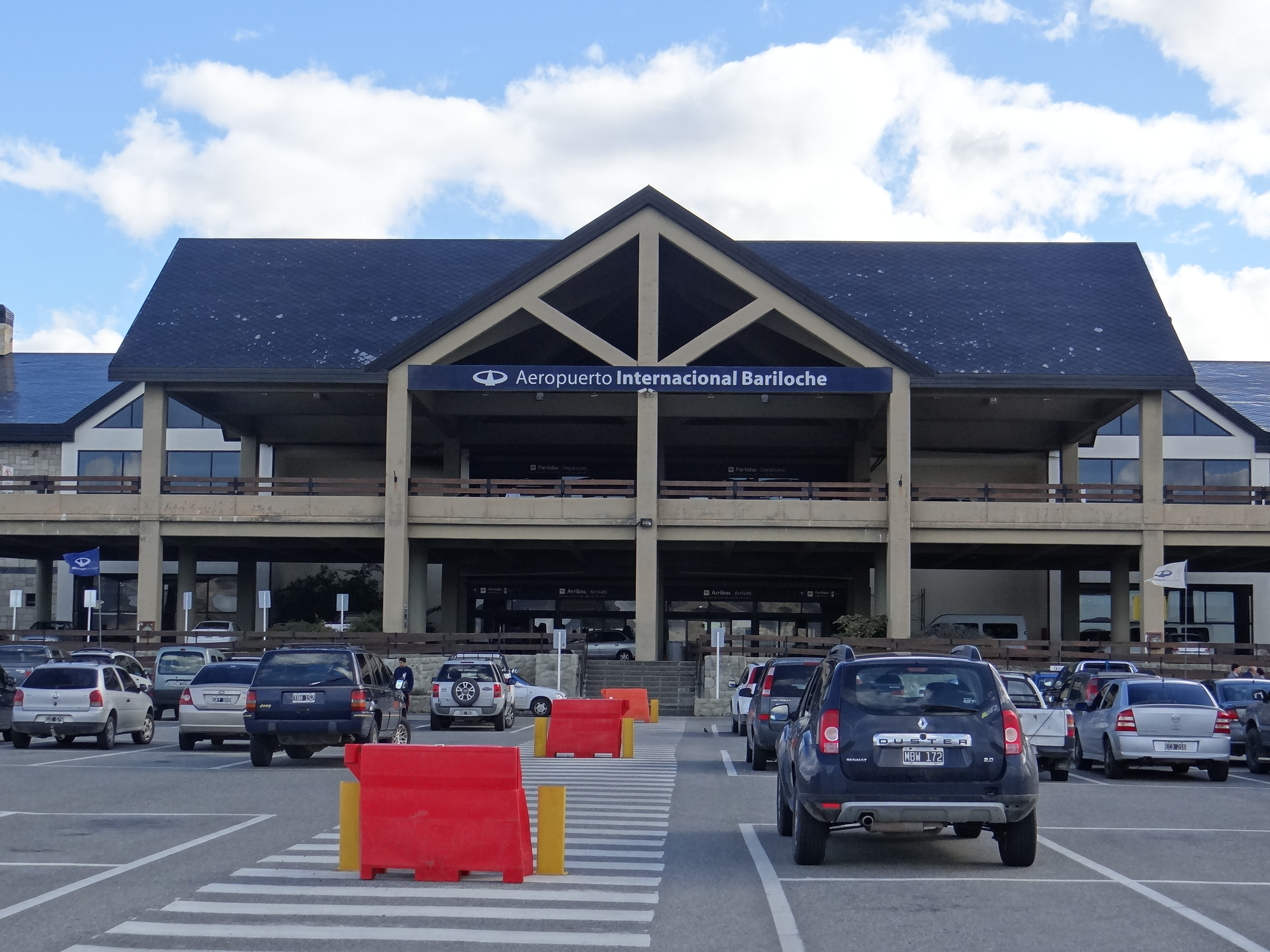
- IATA: BRC; ICAO: SAZS

Summary
- Operator: Aeropuertos Argentina 2000 S.A.
- Serves: San Carlos de Bariloche
- Location: Ruta Nacional Nº 237 s/n
- Elevation AMSL: 2,776 ft (846 m)
- Coordinates: 41°09′04″S 71°09′27″W
- Website: www.aa2000.com.ar/bariloche

Map
- Location in Argentina

Runways
Direction	Length		Surface
Direction	ft	m	Surface
11/29	7,703	2,348	Asphalt

Statistics (2022)
- Total passengers: 1,980,000
- Sources: AIP, ORSNA, World Aero Data, airport statistics for 2017

San Carlos de Bariloche Airport (Spanish: Aeropuerto de San Carlos de Bariloche) (IATA: BRC, ICAO: SAZS), also known as Teniente Luis Candelaria Airport, is an international airport serving the city of San Carlos de Bariloche, Río Negro, Argentina. The airport covers an area of 1,810 hectares (4,500 acres; 7.0 sq mi) and has a 12,000-square-metre (130,000 sq ft) terminal; it is located 13 kilometres (8.1 mi) out of the city.

== Airlines and destinations ==
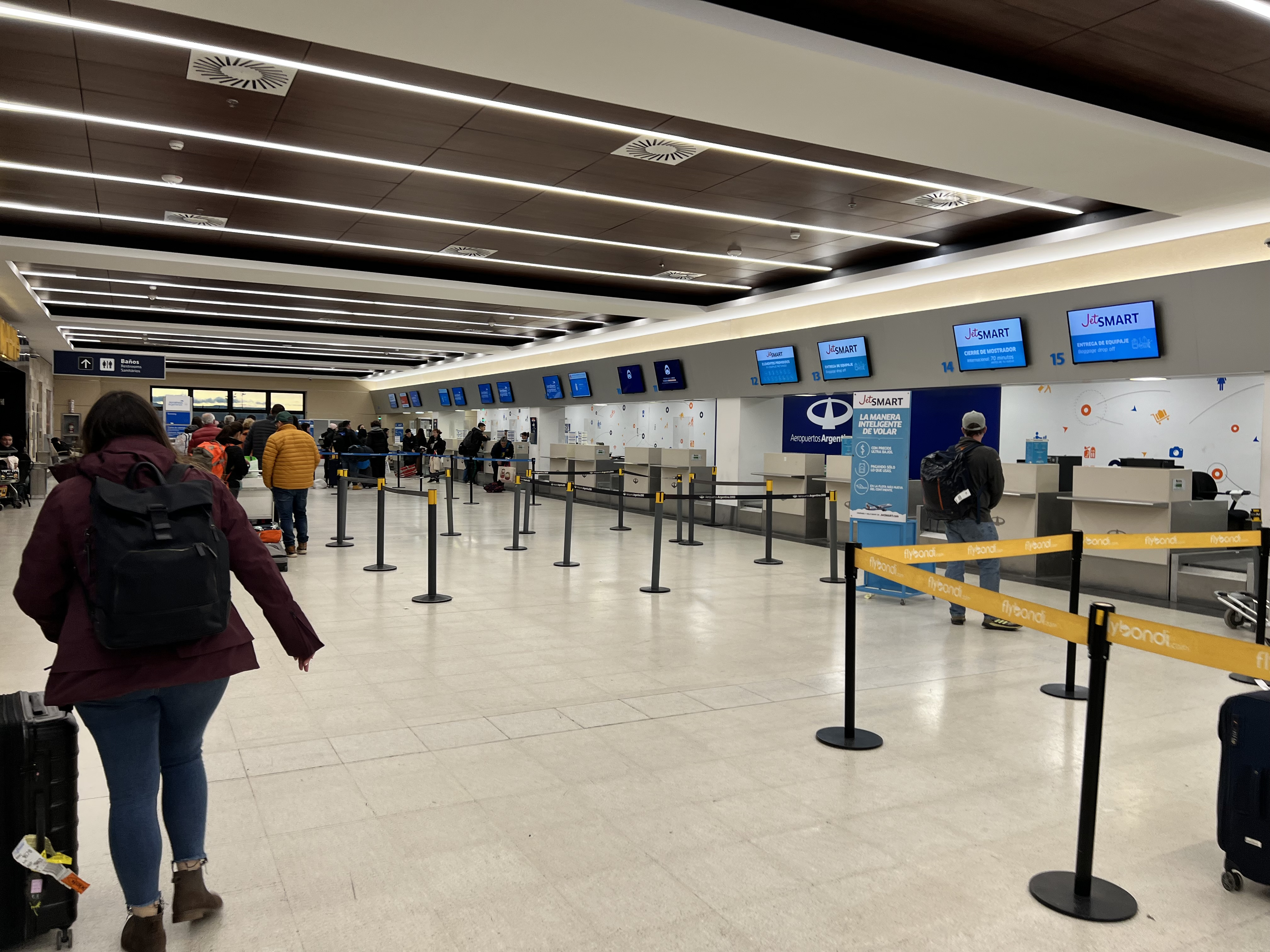
Check-in counters

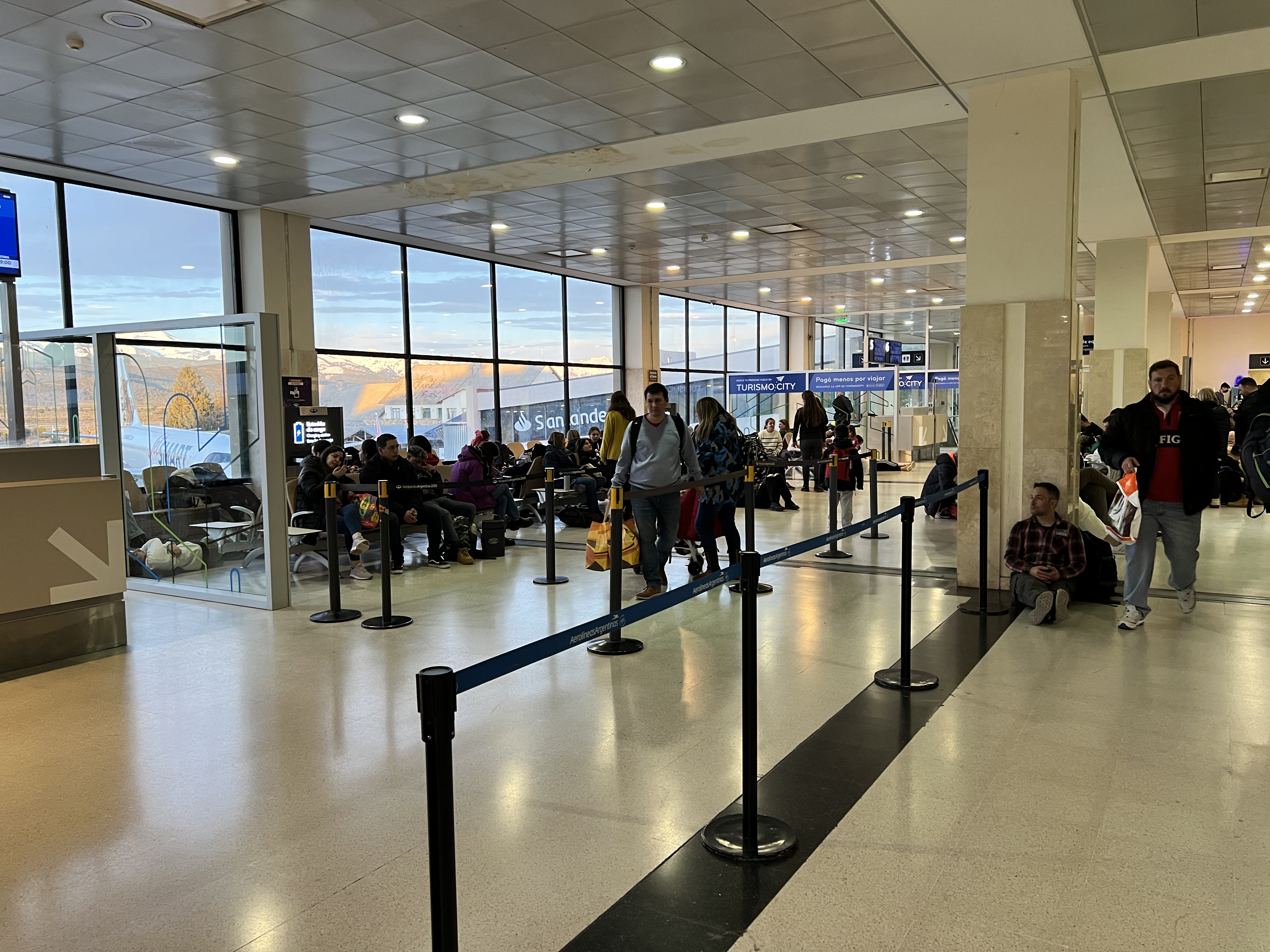
Last waiting room at the airport

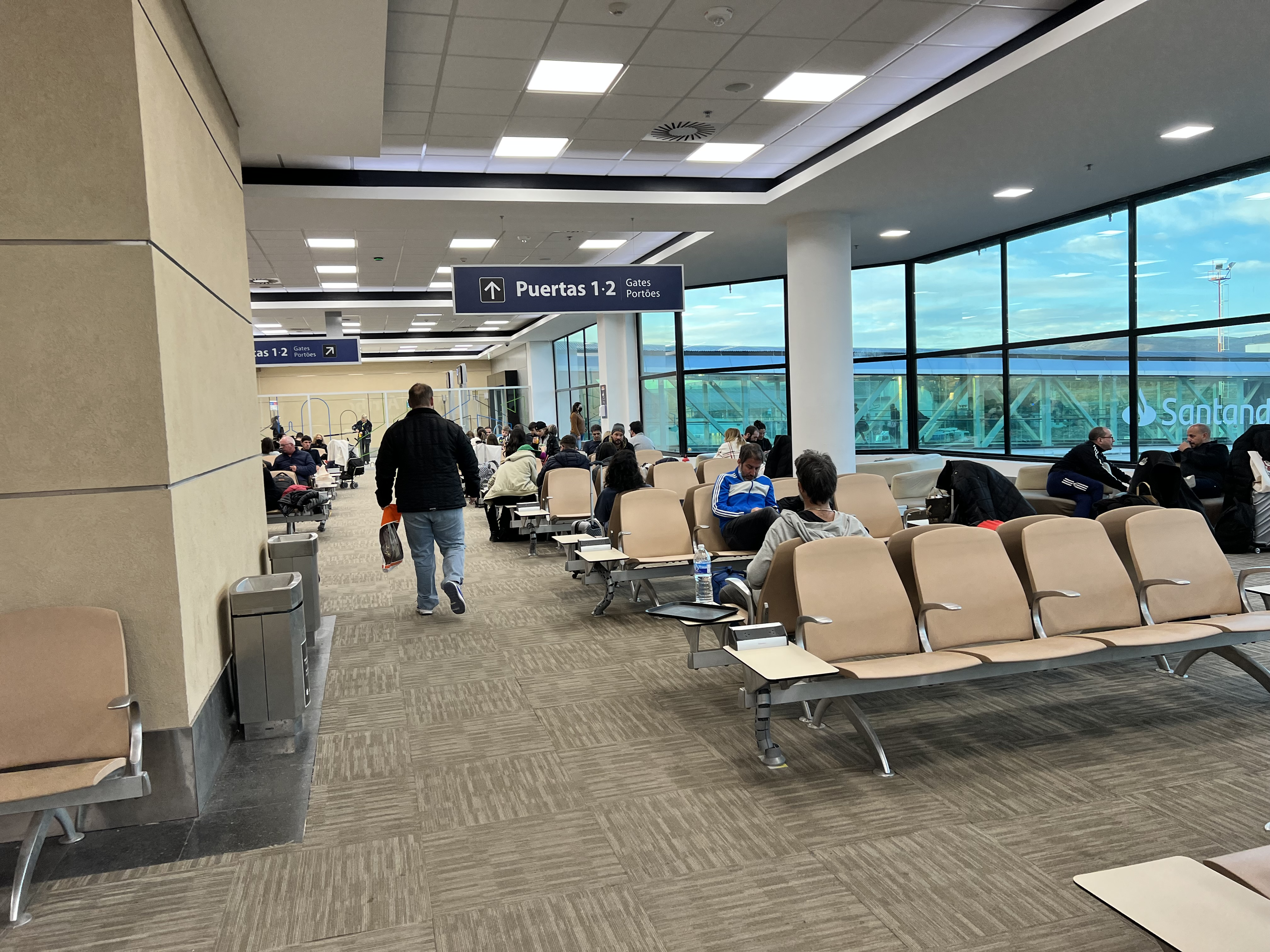
Last waiting room at the airport

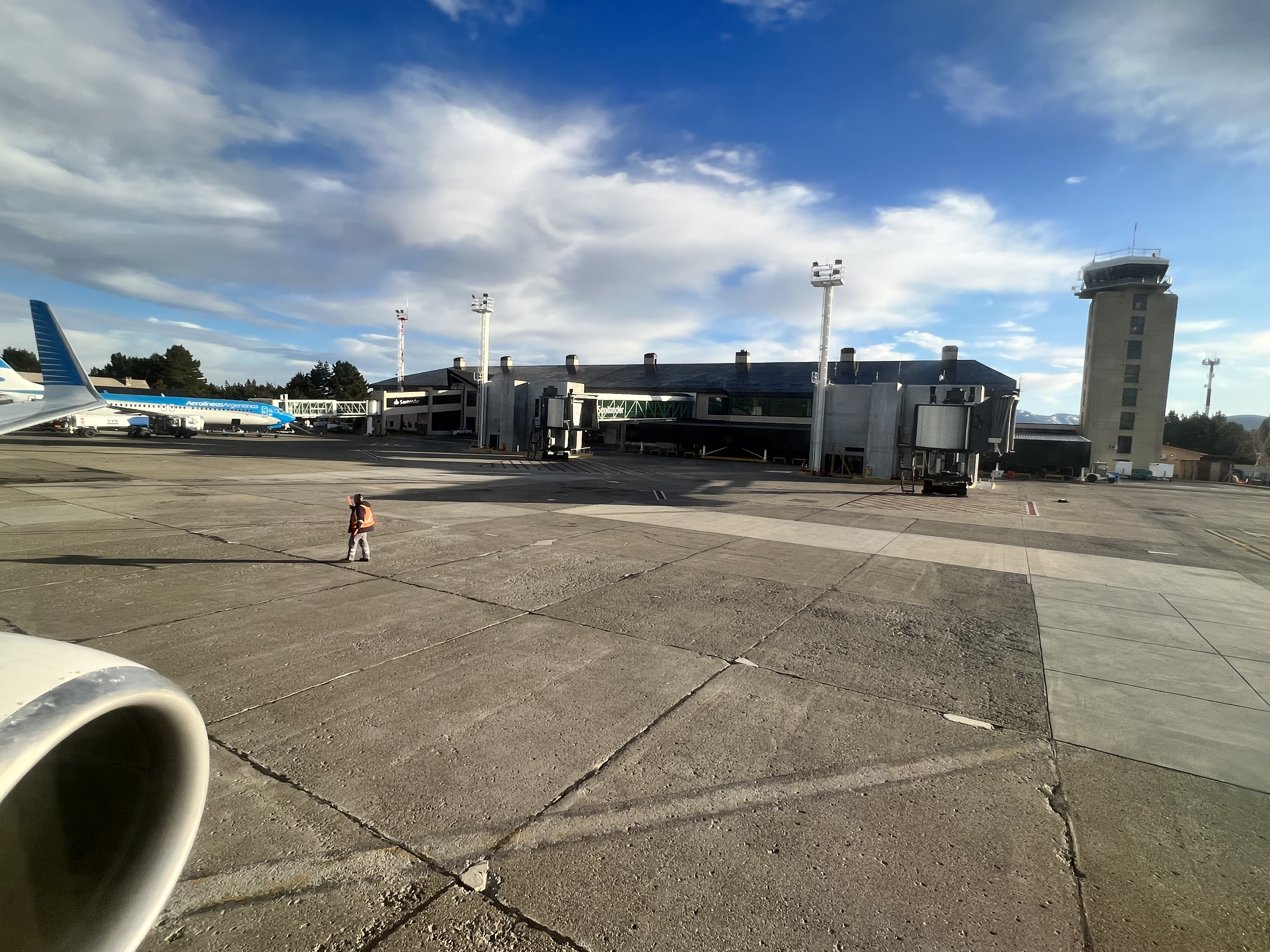
Airside of the airport

Airlines	Destinations
Aerolíneas Argentinas	Buenos Aires–Aeroparque, Córdoba (AR), Mendoza, Rosario, Salta, Tucumán, Viedma; Seasonal: Buenos Aires–Ezeiza, São Paulo–Guarulhos
Azul Brazilian Airlines	Seasonal: Belo Horizonte–Confins, Campinas, Porto Alegre
Gol Linhas Aéreas	Seasonal: São Paulo–Guarulhos
JetSmart Argentina	Buenos Aires–Aeroparque, Buenos Aires–Ezeiza
LADE	Bahía Blanca, Buenos Aires–Aeroparque, Mar del Plata, Puerto Madryn
LATAM Brasil	Seasonal: São Paulo–Guarulhos
LATAM Chile	Seasonal: Santiago de Chile
Sky Airline	Puerto Montt; Seasonal: São Paulo–Guarulhos, Santiago de Chile

== Accidents and incidents ==
=== Accidents involving fatalities ===
- 13 May 1957: A LADE Vickers VC.1 Viking, registration T-3, flew into mountainous terrain, 30 kilometres (19 mi) out of San Carlos de Bariloche. All 16 occupants of the aircraft died in the accident.
- 16 March 1975: A LADE Fokker F27-400M, tail number TC-72, struck a mountain, 35 kilometres (22 mi) west of the city, while on approach to the airport inbound from El Palomar. There were 52 fatalities.
- 21 November 1977: An Austral Líneas Aéreas BAC 1-11, registration LV-JGY, that was operating a domestic non-scheduled Buenos Aires–Bariloche as Flight 9, made a premature descent and crashed into mountainous terrain on final approach to the airport, 21 kilometres (13 mi) east of the city, killing 46 of 79 occupants on board.

=== Non-fatal hull-losses ===
- 16 August 1989: A LADE Fokker F28-1000C, tail number TC-51, failed to get airborne and overran the runway, being stopped by a dike.

== Statistics ==
Traffic by calendar year, official ACI statistics
	Passengers	Change from previous year	Aircraft operations	Change from previous year	Cargo (metric tons)	Change from previous year
2005	648,569	▲10.94%	8,730	▼1.47%	589	▲43.66%
2006	676,197	▲4.26%	8,273	▼5.23%	717	▲21.73%
2007	724,010	▲7.07%	7,830	▼5.35%	660	▼7.95%
2008	701,244	▼3.14%	7,667	▼2.08%	432	▼34.55%
2009	748,400	▲6.72%	8,782	▲14.54%	269	▼37.73%
2010	831,792	▲11.14%	9,477	▲7.91%	274	▲1.86%
Source: Airports Council International. World Airport Traffic Statistics (Years 2005-2010)
2022	1,980,000					{
Source: (Years 2005-2010)

== See also ==
- Transport in Argentina
- List of airports in Argentina
