= Austral Líneas Aéreas Flight 046 =

1988 aviation accident

Coordinates: 34°S 64°W

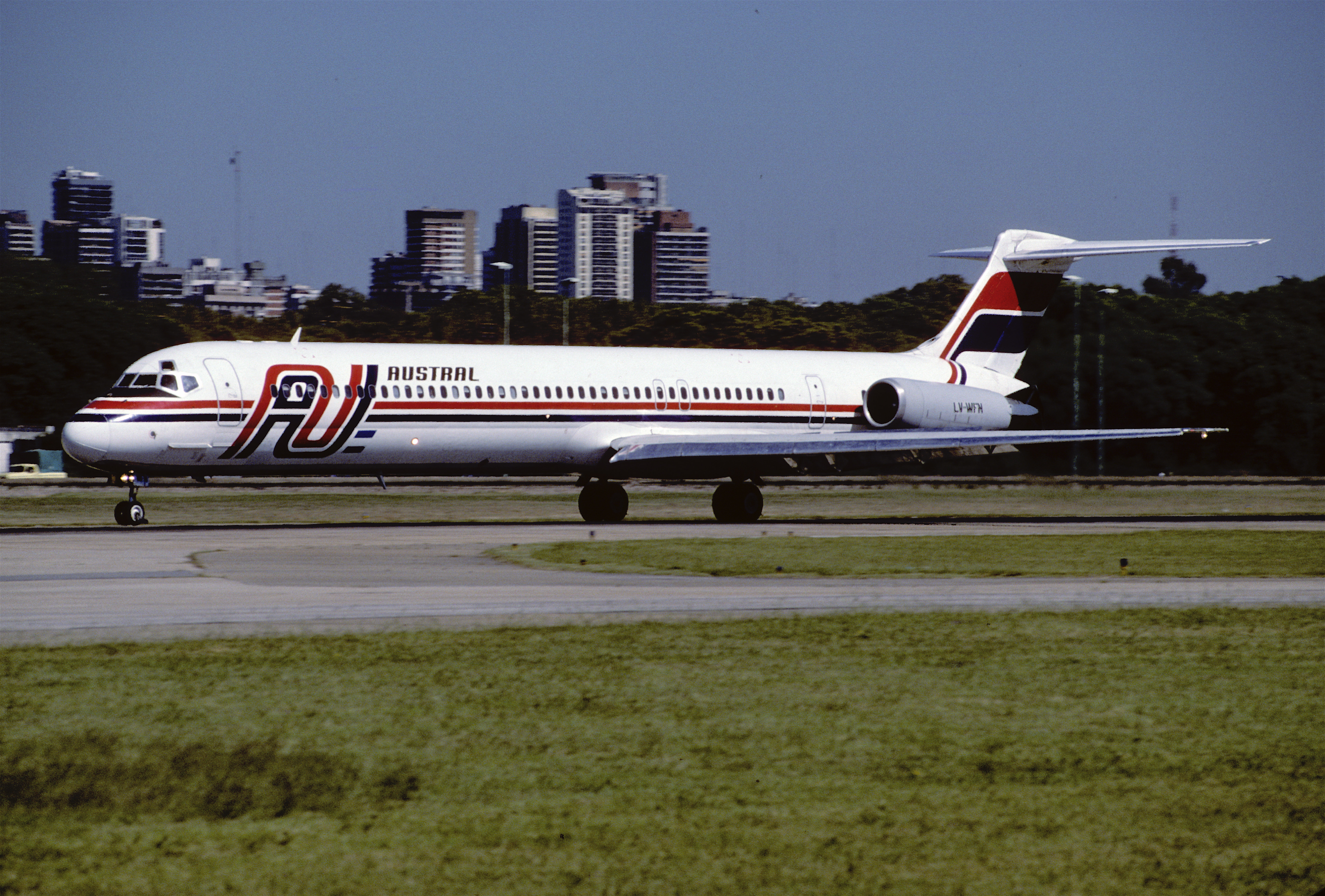
- An Austral Líneas Aéreas MD-81, similar to the one involved in the accident.

Accident
- Date: June 12, 1988
- Summary: Crashed on approach due to pilot error and poor visibility
- Site: Near Libertador General José de San Martín Airport, Posadas, Misiones, Argentina

Aircraft
- Aircraft type: McDonnell Douglas MD-81
- Operator: Austral Líneas Aéreas
- IATA flight No.: AU046
- Registration: N1003G
- Flight origin: Aeroparque Jorge Newbery, Buenos Aires
- Stopover: Resistencia International Airport
- Destination: Posadas Libertador General José de San Martín Airport
- Passengers: 16
- Crew: 6
- Fatalities: 22
- Survivors: 0

Austral Líneas Aéreas Flight 046 was an Argentine scheduled domestic flight from Buenos Aires to Posadas, via Resistencia, that undershot the runway at Libertador General José de San Martín Airport in Posadas on June 12, 1988, in conditions of poor visibility. All 22 of the occupants of flight 046 were killed in the crash.

== Accident sequence ==
Flight 046, operated by a McDonnell Douglas MD-81, departed Buenos Aires' Aeroparque Jorge Newbery to Resistencia at 7:04 local time, and departed from Resistencia to Posadas at 8:40 after a 20-minute stopover. At 9:09, the crew of Flight 046 made radio contact with Posadas air traffic control, and 7 minutes later, the flight was cleared for an approach to Runway 01. The weather at the time was very poor, with extremely dense fog reducing visibility to just 100 meters. Shortly after making contact with controllers at Posados Airport, the aircraft struck the top of a eucalyptus tree, flipped on its side and crashed 3 kilometers (1.9 mi; 1.6 nmi) short of the runway. All on board perished and the aircraft was destroyed on impact.

== Investigation ==
The investigation into the disaster, led by the Junta de Investigación de Accidentes de Aviación Civil (JIAAC) concluded that the main factor in the crash was that the crew attempted to land below the indicated minimum weather conditions for the instrument approach. The crash had severely damaged both the Cockpit Voice and Flight Data Recorders, as the post crash fire rendered large portions of both recordings unusable. Small sections of the recordings were salvaged and analysed thoroughly by the Argentinian investigators. Analysis of the recovered cockpit voice recording revealed the first officer's hesitation to land in extremely dense fog, as well as his dismay when realising the aircraft had descended below the lowest safe altitude permitted for the approach.

The JIAAC made recommendations to the National Transportation Safety Board and McDonnell Douglas to improve the insulation of both recorders, and to strengthen the wiring that connects the cockpit area microphone to the actual cockpit voice recorder located in the empennage.
