= Doctor Fernando Piragine Niveyro International Airport =

Airport in Argentina

Corrientes International Airport Aeropuerto Internacional de Corrientes – Doctor Fernando Piragine Niveyro
- IATA: CNQ; ICAO: SARC

Summary
- Airport type: Public and Military
- Operator: Government
- Serves: Corrientes, Corrientes Province, Argentina
- Location: Ruta N12, Km 1007, Corrientes (W3400)
- Elevation AMSL: 62 m (203 ft)
- Coordinates: 27°26′57″S 058°45′31″W

Map
- Location of the airport in Argentina

Runways
Direction	Length		Surface
Direction	m	ft	Surface
02/20	2,100	6,890	Concrete

Statistics (2016)
- Passengers: 71.883
- Aircraft movements: 4,453
- Source: DAFIF, 2016 World Airport Traffic Report.

Corrientes International Airport (IATA: CNQ, ICAO: SARC) (Spanish: Aeropuerto Internacional de Corrientes), also known as Doctor Fernando Piragine Niveyro International Airport (Spanish: Aeropuerto Internacional Doctor Fernando Piragine Niveyro and Cambá Punta) is an airport in Corrientes Province, Argentina, serving the city of Corrientes, built in 1961 while the terminal was completed in 1964. A new terminal and a new control tower were constructed between 2009 and 2011. The old buildings were demolished.

Between April 2014 and October 2015, Corrientes Airport was closed because of works on its runway. Flights were rescheduled to Resistencia International Airport, about 20 miles (32 km) to the west.

== Airlines and destinations ==
Airlines	Destinations
Aerolíneas Argentinas	Buenos Aires–Aeroparque
