= Libertador General José de San Martín Airport =

Domestic airport in Posadas, Misiones Province, Argentina

Libertador General José de San Martín Airport Aeropuerto de Posadas "Libertador General San Martín"
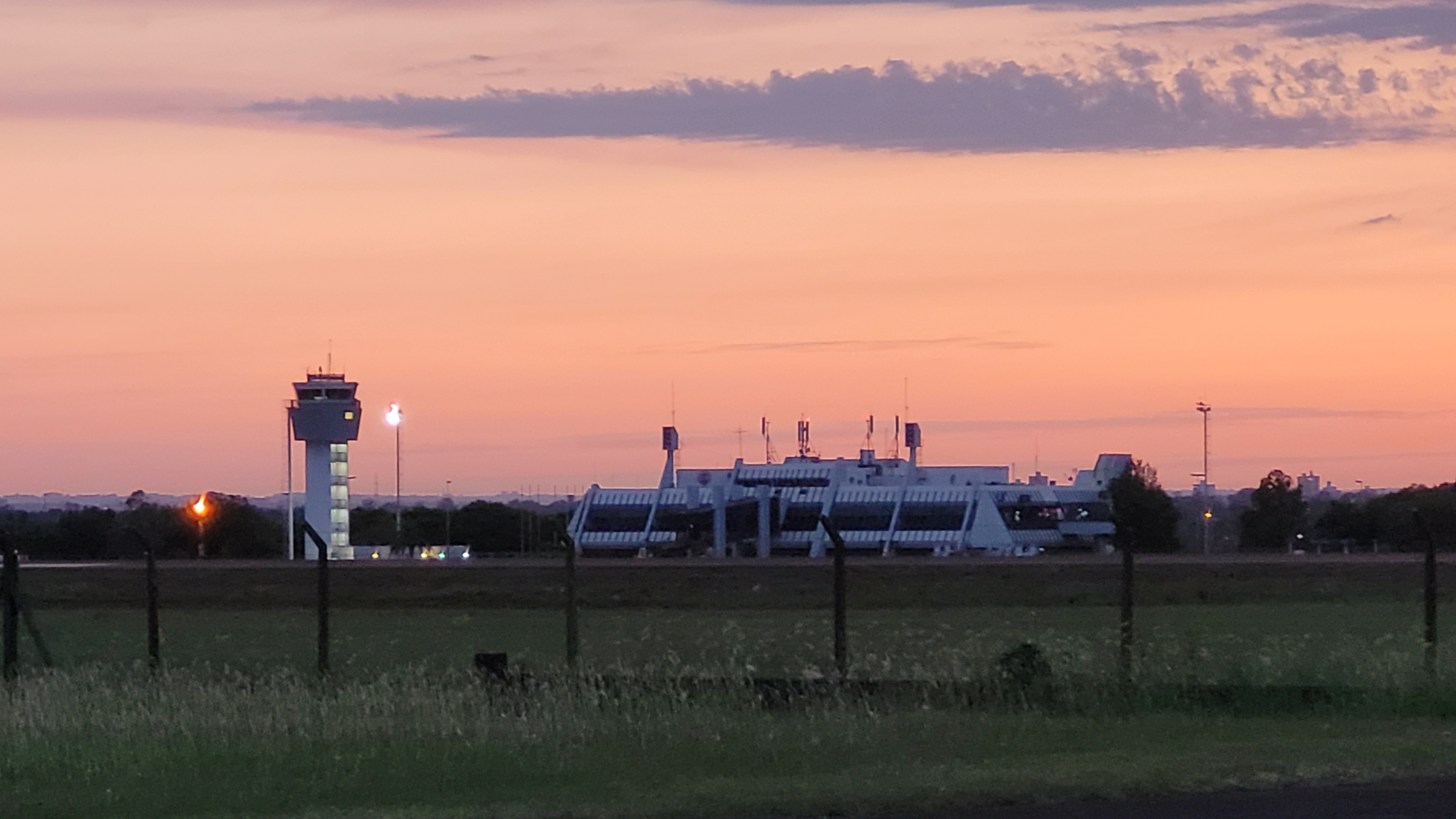
- IATA: PSS; ICAO: SARP

Summary
- Airport type: Public
- Operator: Aeropuertos Argentina 2000
- Serves: Posadas, Argentina
- Elevation AMSL: 430 ft (130 m)
- Coordinates: 27°23′10″S 55°58′14″W

Map
- Location of airport in Argentina

Runways
Direction	Length		Surface
Direction	m	ft	Surface
01/19	2,255	7,398	Asphalt

Statistics (2017)
- Passengers: 209,000
- Passenger change 10–17: ▲115.5%
- Aircraft movements: 2,190
- Movements change 10–17: ▲46.6%
- Sources: AIP, ORSNA, WAD GCM

Libertador General José de San Martín Airport (Spanish: Aeropuerto de Posadas "Libertador General San Martín") (IATA: PSS, ICAO: SARP) is located 7.5 km (4.7 mi) southwest of the center of Posadas, a city in the Misiones Province of Argentina. The airport covers an area of 329 hectares (813 acres) and is operated by Aeropuertos Argentina 2000

== Airlines and destinations ==
Airlines	Destinations
Aerolíneas Argentinas	Buenos Aires–Aeroparque, Córdoba (AR)
JetSmart Argentina	Buenos Aires–Aeroparque

== Statistics ==
Traffic by calendar year. Official ACI Statistics
	Passengers	Change from previous year	Aircraft operations	Change from previous year	Cargo (metric tons)	Change from previous year
2001	128,000	-	2,666	-	-	-
2002	93,000	▼27.35%	1,684	▼36.83%	-	-
2003	101,787	▲4.30%	1,297	▼22.98%	-	-
2004	122,000	▲25.77%	1,484	▲14.42%	-	-
2005	113,000	▼7.38%	1,482	▼0.13%	564	▲8.25%
2006	108,000	▼4.42%	1,334	▼9.99%	455	▼19.33%
2007	65,019	▼39.80%	863	▼35.31%	313	▼31.21%
2008	62,000	▼4.64%	742	▼14.02%	210	▼32.91%
2009	114,000	▲83.87%	1,325	▲78.57%	345	▲64.29%
2010	97,000	▼14.91%	1,494	▲12.75%	379	▲9.86%
2011	93,000	▼4.12%	1,319	▼11.71%	-	-
2012	96,000	▲3.23%	1,361	▲3.18%	-	-
2013	111,000	▲15.63%	1,431	▲5.14%	-	-
2014	129,000	▲16.22%	1,529	▲6.85%	-	-
2015	175,000	▲35.66%	1,948	▲27.40%	-	-
2016	174,000	▼0.57	1,964	▲0.82%	-	-
2017	209,000	▲20.11%	2,190	▲11.51%	-	-
2018	295,000	▲41.15%	3,188	▲45.57%	-	-
2019	320,000	▲8.47%	3,103	▼2.67%	-	-
2020	64,000	▼80.00%	666	▼78.54%	-	-
2021	141,000	▲120.31%	1,390	▲108.71%	-	-
2022	228,000	▲61.70%	1,925	▲38.49%	-	-
Source: Airports Council International. World Airport Traffic Statistics (Years 2005-2010). Aviación Civil Argentina (2011-2022).

== Accidents and incidents ==
On June 12, 1988, Austral Líneas Aéreas Flight 046 undershot the runway, resulting in 67 deaths.

== See also ==
- Transport in Argentina
- List of airports in Argentina
