= Aeroparque Jorge Newbery =

International airport serving downtown Buenos Aires, Argentina

Jorge Newbery Airpark Aeroparque-Jorge Newbery Airport

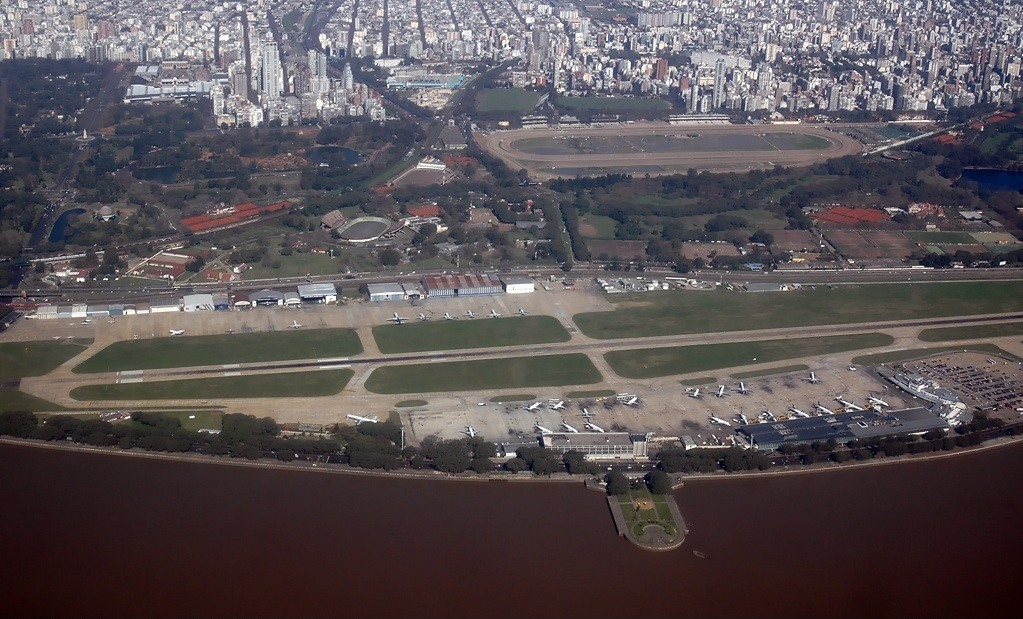
- Aerial view of the airport
- IATA: AEP; ICAO: SABE

Summary
- Airport type: Public / Military
- Operator: Aeropuertos Argentina 2000 S.A.
- Serves: Buenos Aires, Argentina
- Opened: 1947; 79 years ago
- Hub for: Aerolíneas Argentinas; JetSmart Argentina
- Elevation AMSL: 5 m (16 ft)
- Coordinates: 34°33′32″S 058°24′59″W
- Website: www.aa2000.com.ar/en/AEP

Map
- Location of airport in Argentina

Runways
Direction	Length		Surface
Direction	m	ft	Surface
13/31	2,700	8,858	Concrete

Statistics (2025)
- Total passengers: 17,738,000
- Ranking in Argentina: 1st
- Sources: EANA Argentine AIP ORSNA

Jorge Newbery Airpark (IATA: AEP, ICAO: SABE), commonly known as Aeroparque, is an international airport located 2 km (1.2 mi) northwest of downtown Buenos Aires, Argentina.

Aeroparque located along the Río de la Plata, in the Palermo neighbourhood, and serves as the city's inner-city airport for domestic routes and regional South American destinations, while most long-haul international traffic is handled by the larger Ezeiza International Airport. Operating since 1947, the airport covers an area of 138 hectares (341 acres) and is operated by Aeropuertos Argentina 2000 S.A.

== History ==
The airport was originally proposed by Mayor Carlos Noel in 1925. A number of feasibility studies and zoning disputes followed. In 1938, plans were submitted for an island airport connected via causeway to Avenida General Paz (then under construction). A former wetland reclaimed in 1916 from the Río de la Plata and closer to downtown was selected instead, and the facility, designed by Aeronautics Secretariat engineer Víctor Acuña in 1945, was inaugurated in 1947 as Aeroparque 17 de Octubre (17 October Airfield).

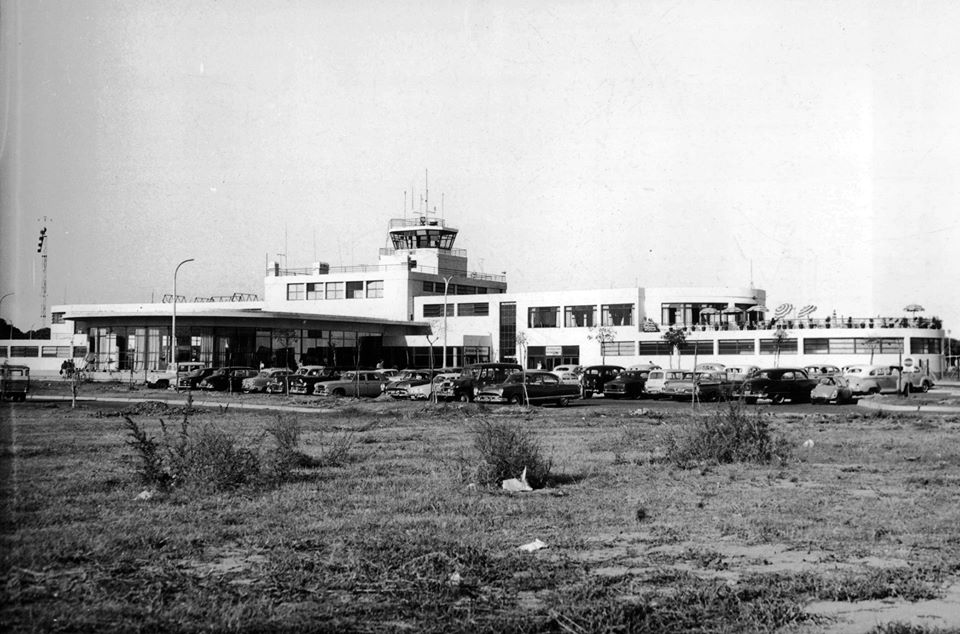
Aeroparque in 1962.

Initially served by a single 1,000 m (3,280 ft 10 in) runway, it began operations in January 1948 as the main hub for domestic flights from Buenos Aires as well as flights to Uruguay. Its first terminal was completed in 1951, by which time the runway was extended to 1,550 m (5,085 ft 4 in). The airport was renamed following the 1955 coup against President Juan Perón in honor of the pioneer of Argentine aviation, Jorge Newbery, and was re-inaugurated in 1960 following work that expanded its main runway to 2,070 m (6,791 ft 4 in), and also added a new terminal. The Argentine Air Force had a small base built near the eastern end of the airport in 1965; at this site, President Isabel Perón was formally deposed by the military in the March 1976 coup. A new terminal for national air carrier Aerolíneas Argentinas was inaugurated in 1981, expanding total terminal area to 30,000 m^{2} (320,000 sq ft).

Plans to merge Newbery with Ezeiza International Airport in a new facility located on an artificial island were revived in 1996 by a commission headed by Congressman Álvaro Alsogaray, though these plans were ultimately dropped. Its operations, like those of all the nation's public airports, were privatized in 1998 and transferred to Aeropuertos Argentina 2000 (part of the conglomerate owned by local businessman Eduardo Eurnekian). The runway was further extended by 180 m (590 ft 7 in) in 2007, and work began in 2009 to create greater distance between the nearby Rafael Obligado Coast Highway and the eastern end of the runway. Routes were added in March 2010 to destinations in Brazil, Chile, and Paraguay. Work began in 2011 on Terminals III and IV, totaling 35,000 m^{2} (380,000 sq ft). These terminals were inaugurated in March 2014, effectively doubling the airport's passenger capacity. A recent increase in the number of airlines and flights operating at the airport has brought it to the limit of its capacity. Thus, the government decided to move all international flights (with the exception of those to Uruguay) to Ezeiza Airport from 2019. An expansion of the runway was completed during the COVID-19 pandemic in order to accommodate wide-body aircraft, such as the Airbus A330. In a push to connect tourists with domestic flights at the airport, the government allowed international flights to recommence.

== Airlines and destinations ==
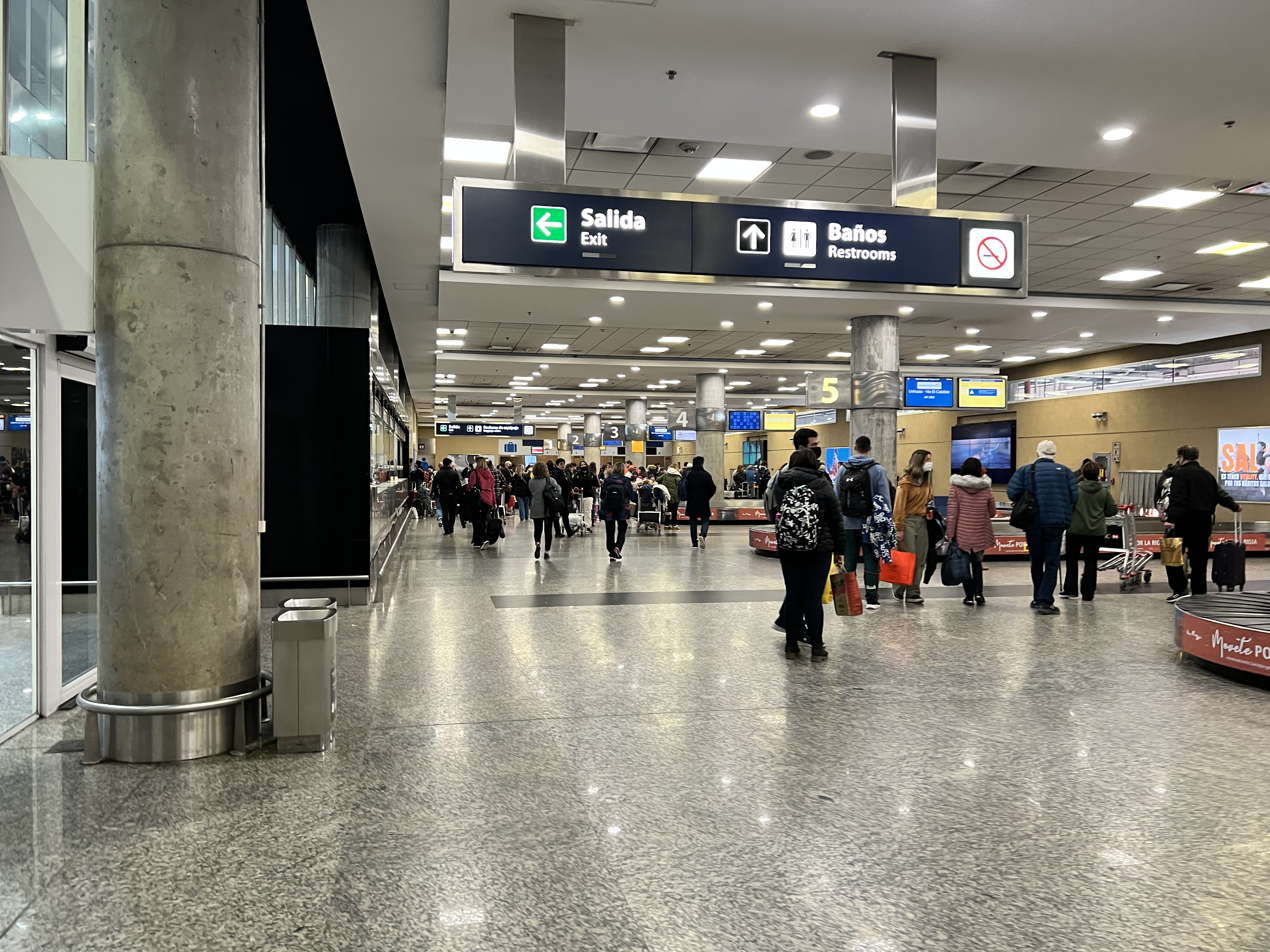
Baggage Claim area at the airport.

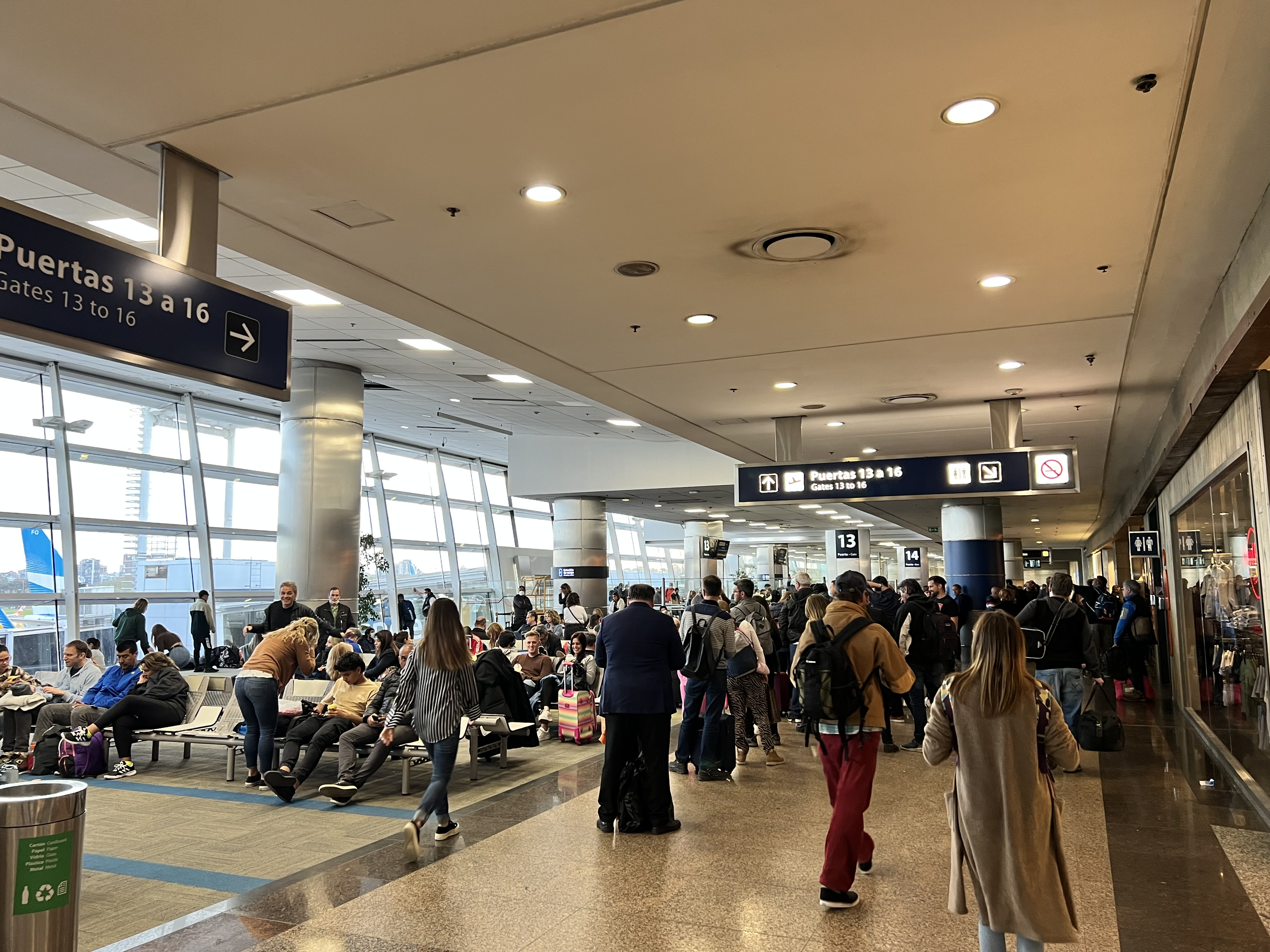
Boarding gates at the airport.

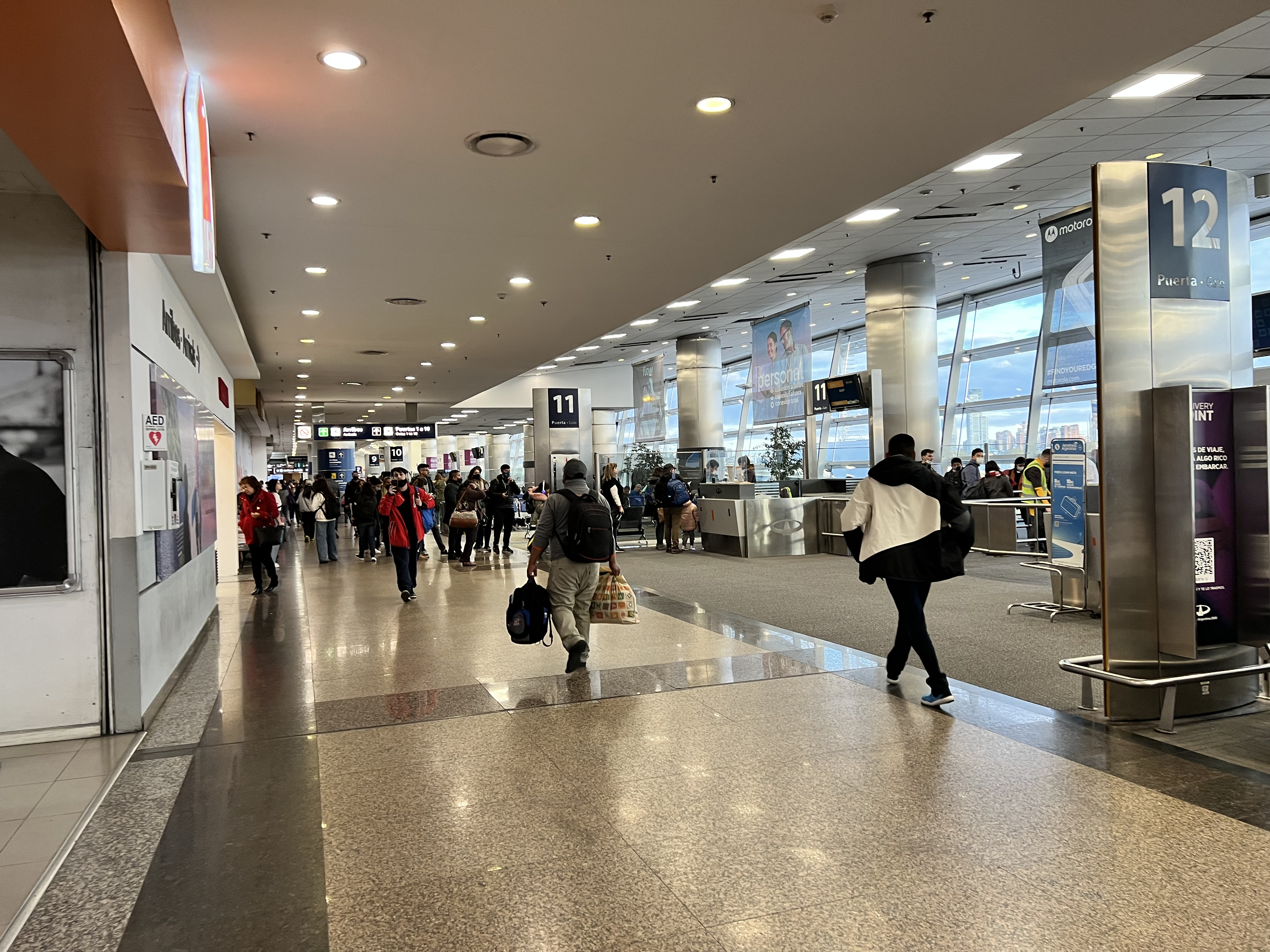
Boarding gates at the airport.

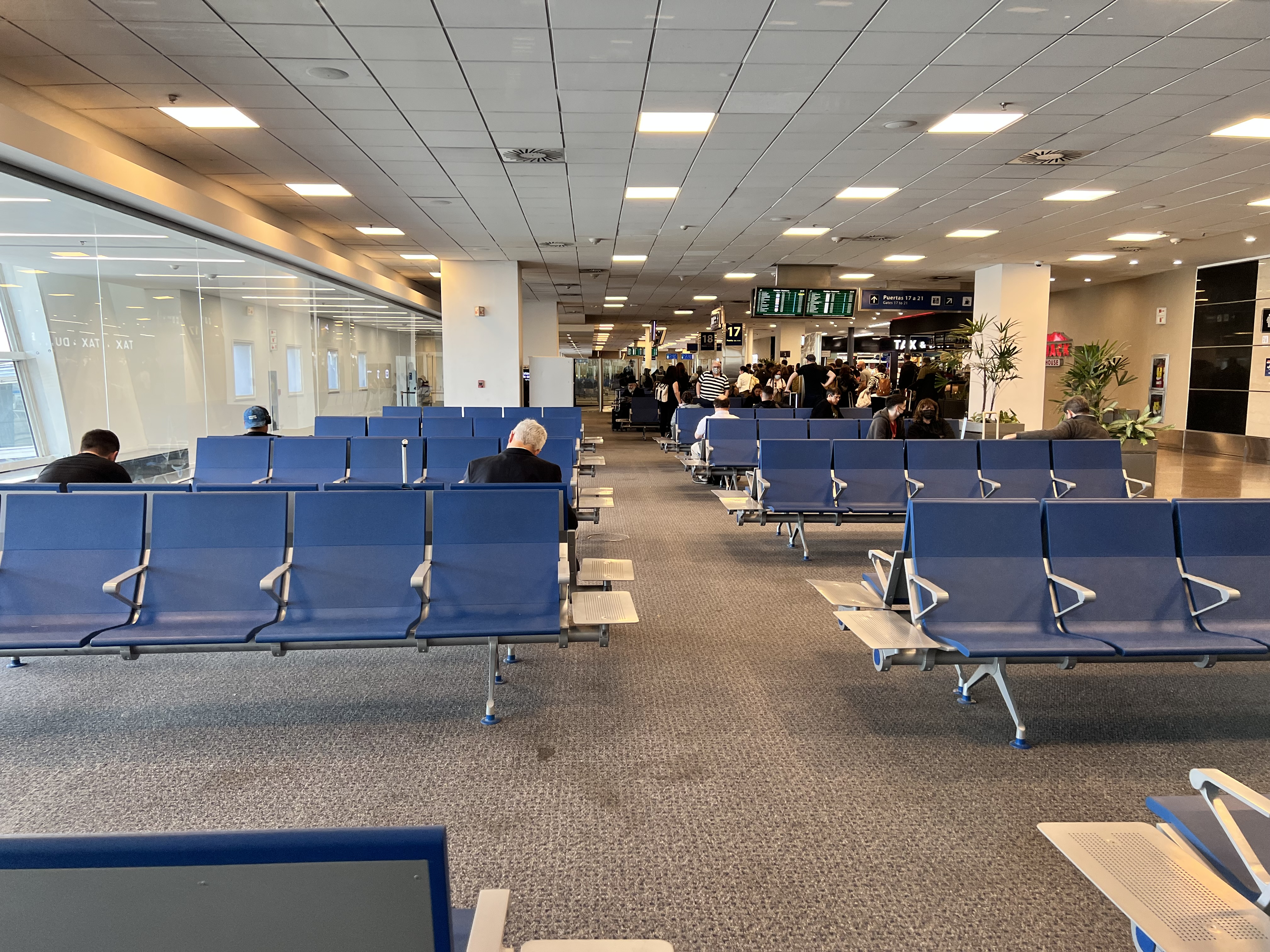
International Boarding gates at the airport.

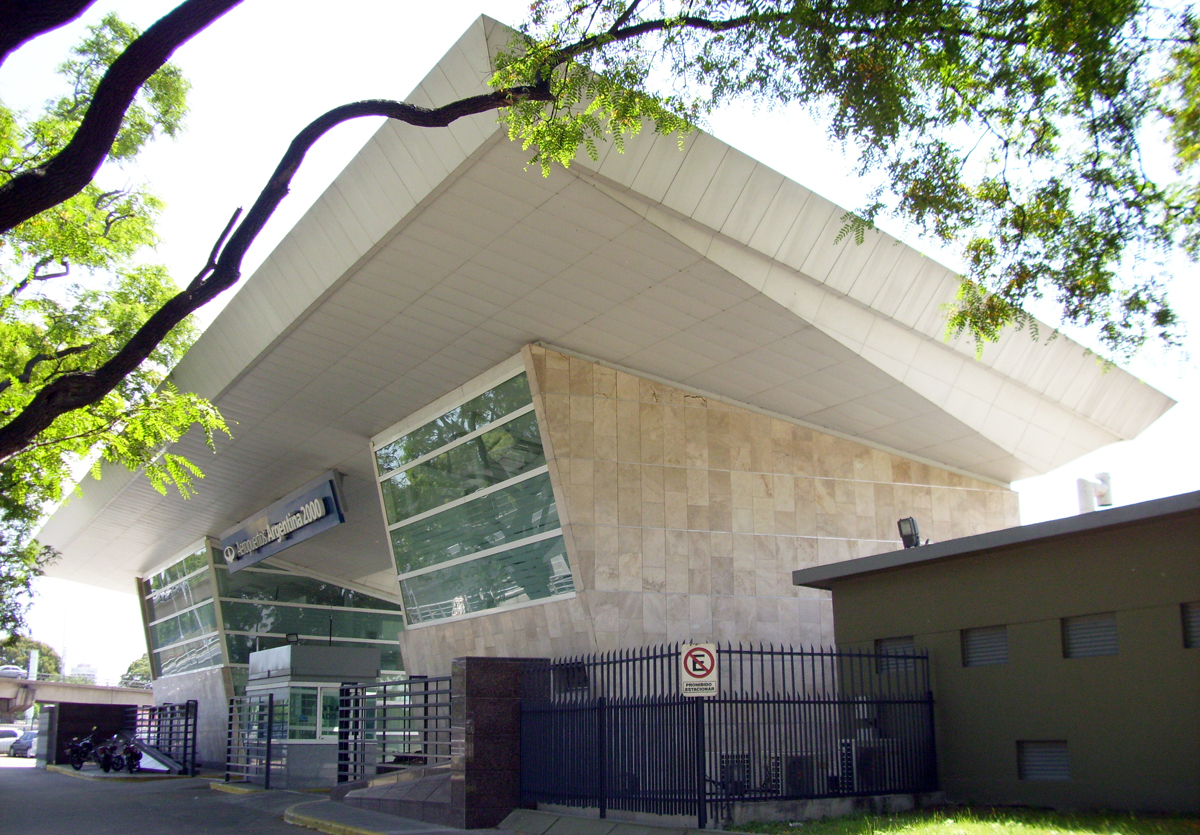
Southern Terminal

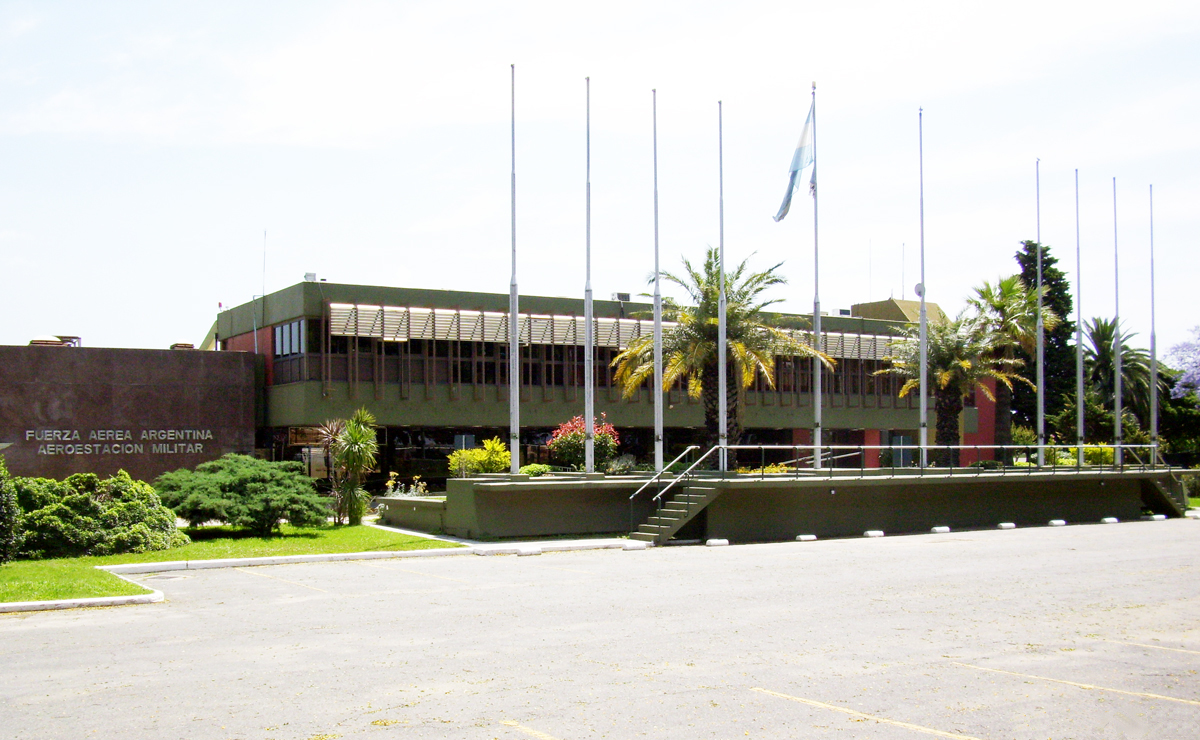
Air Force Base located east of the terminals

Airlines	Destinations
Aerolíneas Argentinas	Asunción, Bogotá, Cartagena (begins 1 January 2027), Catamarca, Curitiba, Florianópolis, Montevideo, Porto Alegre, Porto Seguro, Punta del Este, Rio de Janeiro–Galeão, Salvador da Bahia, São Paulo–Guarulhos; Seasonal: Brasília, Cabo Frio
Avianca	Bogotá
Gol Linhas Aéreas	Belo Horizonte–Confins, Brasília, Florianópolis, Fortaleza (ends 28 January 2027), Natal (ends 30 January 2027), Porto Alegre, Recife (ends 30 January 2027), Rio de Janeiro–Galeão, Salvador da Bahia (ends 31 January 2027), São Paulo–Guarulhos; Seasonal: Punta del Este
Humming Airways	Concordia, Olavarría, Paraná, Tandil, Tres Arroyos, Villa Gesell
JetSmart Argentina	Asunción, Comodoro Rivadavia, Córdoba (AR), El Calafate, Florianópolis, Lima, Mendoza, Natal, Neuquén, Posadas, Puerto Iguazú, Recife, Resistencia, Rio de Janeiro–Galeão, Salta, San Carlos de Bariloche, San Martín de los Andes, San Miguel de Tucumán, San Salvador de Jujuy, Santiago de Chile, Trelew, Ushuaia
JOY Airline	San Salvador de Jujuy
LATAM Brasil	Porto Alegre, Rio de Janeiro–Galeão, São Paulo–Guarulhos
Paranair	Asunción
Sky Airline	Santiago de Chile

== Statistics ==
Traffic by calendar year. Aeroparque Jorge Newbery
	Passengers	Change from previous year	Aircraft operations	Change from previous year	Cargo (metric tons)	Change from previous year
2000	6,187,563	▼1.77%	N.A.	N.A.	N.A.	N.A.
2001	4,411,179	▼28.71%	N.A.	N.A.	N.A.	N.A.
2002	3,891,699	▼11.78%	N.A.	N.A.	N.A.	N.A.
2003	5,342,894	▲37.29%	N.A.	N.A.	N.A.	N.A.
2004	5,245,923	▼1.81%	84,844	N.A.	30,312	N.A.
2005	5,372,195	▲2.41%	77,742	▼8.37%	26,415	▼12.86%
2006	5,289,074	▼1.55%	79,223	▲1.91%	13,471	▼49.00%
2007	5,665,808	▲7.12%	81,340	▲2.67%	14,078	▲4.51%
2008	5,687,221	▲0.38%	85,793	▲5.47%	14,690	▲4.35%
2009	6,449,344	▲13.40%	91,676	▲6.86%	13,700	▼6.74%
2010	7,558,149	▲17.19%	104,857	▲14.38%	18,945	▲38.28%
2011	8,250,971	▲9.17%	N.A.	N.A.	N.A.	N.A.
2012	8,849,465	▲7.25%	N.A.	N.A.	N.A.	N.A.
2013	9,552,504	▲7.94%	N.A.	N.A.	N.A.	N.A.
2024	14,890,000	N.A.	N.A.	N.A.	N.A.	N.A.
2025	17,738,000	▲19.13%	N.A.	N.A.	N.A.	N.A.
Source: Airports Council International: World Airport Traffic Report (Years 2005-2010) and other sources.

== Accidents and incidents ==
- On 11 January 1957, LADE Vickers Viking T-11 crashed on take-off. All 35 occupants perished.
- On 30 June 1961, Transcontinental S.A. C-46 Commando LV-FTO crashed on landing approach. Of 35 occupants, 24 died.
- On 17 December 1969, Austral Líneas Aéreas C-46 Commando LV-GEB lost engine 1 due to fuel exhaustion shortly after takeoff. The plane failed to gain height and made a crash landing in a small sport field.
- On 11 May 1975, Vickers Viscount CX-AQO of PLUNA was damaged beyond economic repair when it departed the runway.
- On 7 May 1981, Austral Líneas Aéreas Flight 901, a BAC 1-11, crashed on approach after a flight from Tucumán. All 31 passengers and crew were killed.
- On 24 February 1999, Aerolíneas Argentinas MD-88 LV-VBY was destroyed by a hangar fire.
- On 31 August 1999, LAPA Flight 3142, a Boeing 737-200, crashed during takeoff due to pilot error. 63 of the 100 passengers and crew were killed. Two people on the ground were also killed, raising the death toll to 65.

== See also ==
- Museo Nacional de Aeronáutica de Argentina
- Buenos Aires-Ezeiza International Airport
- List of airports in Argentina
- Transport in Argentina
