= Governor Francisco Gabrielli International Airport =

International airport serving Mendoza, Argentina

Governor Francisco Gabrielli International Airport Aeropuerto Internacional de Mendoza "Francisco Gabrielli" – El Plumerillo
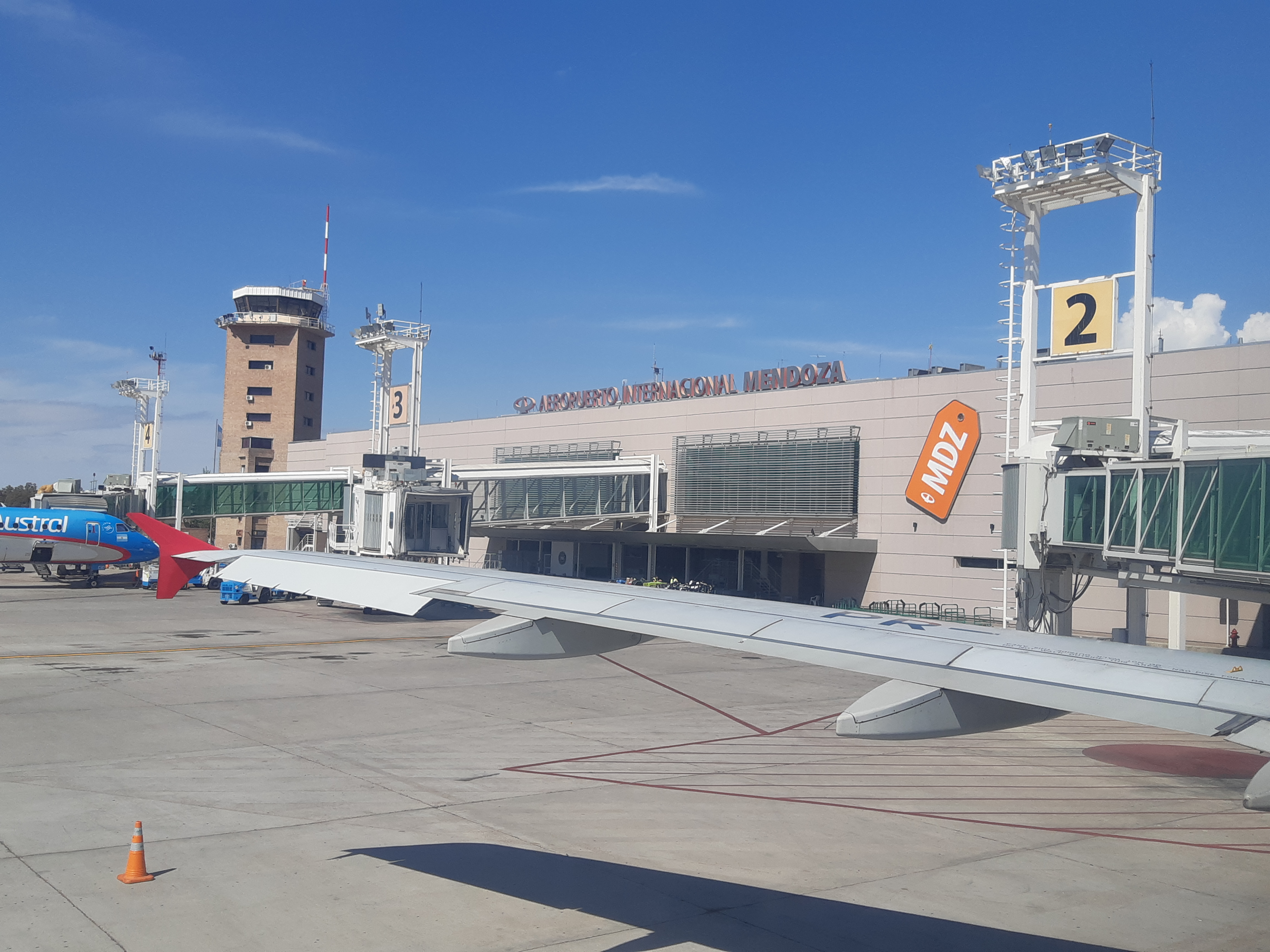
- IATA: MDZ; ICAO: SAME

Summary
- Airport type: Public / military
- Operator: Aeropuertos Argentina 2000
- Serves: Mendoza, Argentina
- Elevation AMSL: 2,310 ft (700 m)
- Coordinates: 32°49′54″S 068°47′34″W

Map
- Location of airport in Argentina

Runways
Direction	Length		Surface
Direction	m	ft	Surface
18/36	2,789	9,150	Concrete

Statistics (2017)
- Total passengers: 1.813.623
- Sources: AIP, ORSNA, WAD

Governor Francisco Gabrielli International Airport (Spanish: Aeropuerto Internacional Gobernador Francisco Gabrielli) (IATA: MDZ, ICAO: SAME), better known as El Plumerillo International Airport, is located 8 kilometres (5.0 mi) northeast of the centre of Mendoza, capital of the Mendoza Province of Argentina. It is operated by Aeropuertos Argentina 2000.

The 4th Air Brigade (El Plumerillo Military Air Base) is located on the southern section of the airport.

== Airlines and destinations ==
Airlines	Destinations
Aerolíneas Argentinas	São Paulo–Guarulhos; Seasonal: Aruba, Rio de Janeiro–Galeão
Arajet	Punta Cana
Azul Brazilian Airlines	Seasonal: Campinas
Gol Linhas Aéreas	São Paulo–Guarulhos; Seasonal: Rio de Janeiro–Galeão
JetSmart Argentina	Buenos Aires–Aeroparque, Buenos Aires–Ezeiza, Salta
JetSmart Chile	Rio de Janeiro–Galeão, Santiago de Chile
LATAM Brasil	São Paulo–Guarulhos

== Statistics ==
Traffic by calendar year. Official ACI statistics.
	Passengers	Change from previous year	Aircraft operations	Change from previous year	Cargo (metric tons)	Change from previous year
2005	652,504	▲10.20%	14,938	▲4.32%	2,645	▲17.87%
2006	655,318	▲0.43%	12,586	▼15.75%	3,054	▲15.46%
2007	689,963	▲5.29%	10,625	▼15.58%	3,364	▲10.15%
2008	780,464	▲13.12%	12,017	▲13.10%	3,436	▲2.14%
2009	858,984	▲10.06%	12,354	▲2.80%	2,759	▼19.70%
2010	976,889	▲13.73%	13,688	▲10.80%	5,533	▲100.54%
Source: Airports Council International. World Airport Traffic Statistics (Years 2005-2010)

== Accidents and incidents ==
- 20 January 1944: A LanChile Lodestar 18–50, registration CC-CLC-0072, was due to operate a Mendoza–San Juan cargo service when it crashed on takeoff, killing all 12 occupants on board.

== See also ==
- Transport in Argentina
- List of airports in Argentina
