= List of Aerolíneas Argentinas destinations =

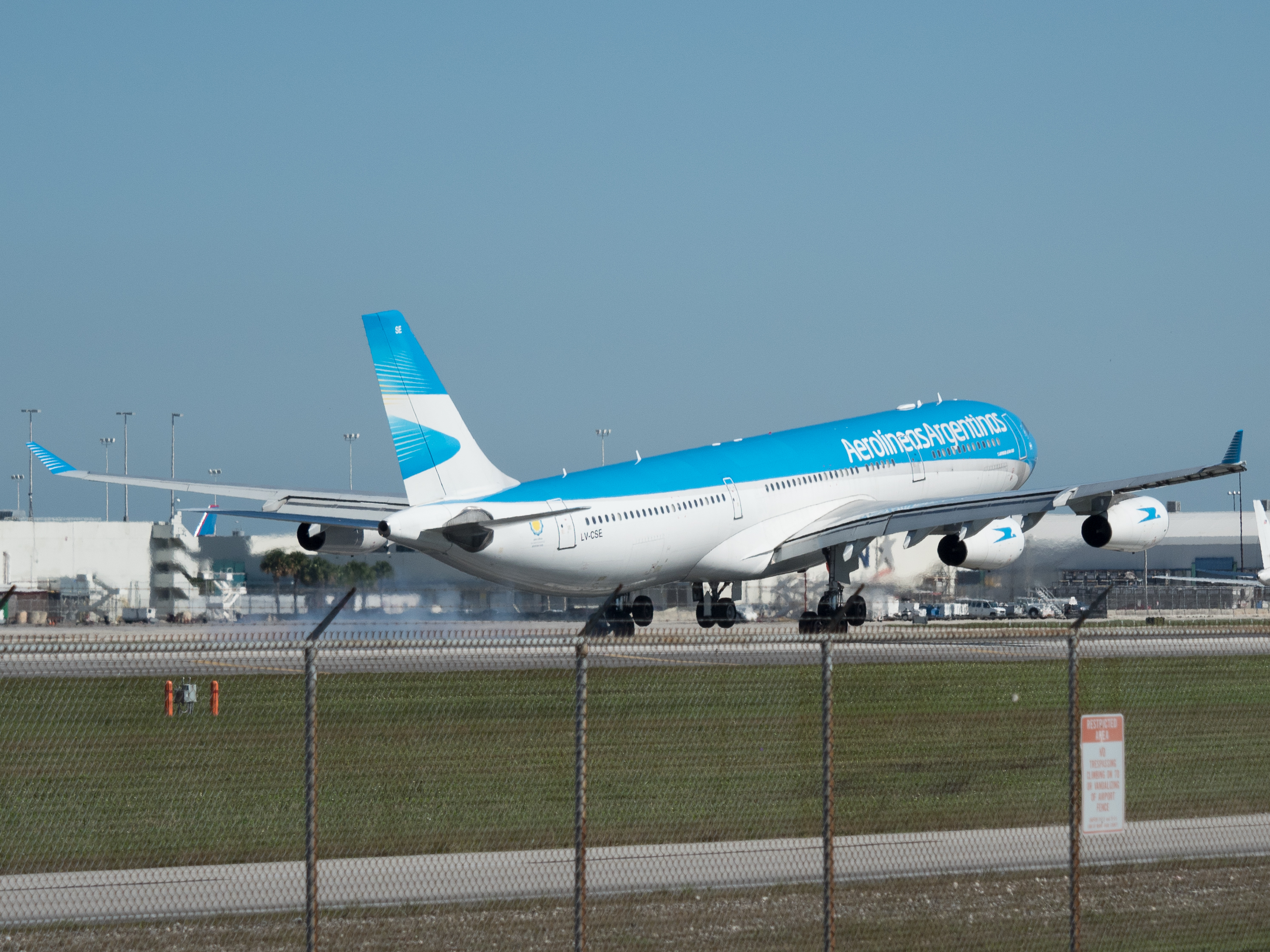
An Aerolíneas Argentinas Airbus A340-300 at Miami International Airport

Aerolíneas Argentinas was formed by the Argentine's Ministry of Transport as a state corporation in May 1949, when it took over the routes and assets of four struggling airlines. A year and a half later, in late December 1950, the company introduced the Buenos Aires–Rio de Janeiro–Natal–Dakar–Lisbon–Paris–Frankfurt route, using 48-seater DC-6 equipment, linking Argentina with Germany for the first time since 1933. By May 1952, the carrier's route network was 35,500 miles (57,100 km) long. Upon taking delivery of the first three Comet 4s, which also became the first jetliners in the airline's fleet, these brand new aircraft were deployed on the Buenos Aires–London, Buenos Aires–New York City, and Buenos Aires–Santiago de Chile routes.

As of December 2012, the airline's top five international routes in terms of available seat kilometre (ASK) were Buenos Aires-Ezeiza–Madrid-Barajas, Buenos Aires-Ezeiza–Miami, Buenos Aires-Ezeiza–Barcelona, Buenos Aires-Ezeiza–Rome-Fiumicino and Buenos Aires-Ezeiza–Sydney; European routes account for about 41% of total ASK. In January 2013, the airline was granted permission to operate services to Atlanta, Detroit, Guangzhou, Las Vegas and Tel Aviv, yet it was announced it would not fly to these destinations with its own aircraft in the near future. In November 2013, the carrier announced the discontinuance of services to Sydney starting in April 2014. Aerolíneas had previously served Sydney via Auckland until the city was removed from the airline's international network in July 2012. After leaving the Buenos Aires–New York JFK market unserved since 2008, Aerolíneas Argentinas resumed these flights in December 2013. As of September 2016, the airline's top five domestic airports by available seats are Aeroparque Jorge Newbery, Ingeniero Aeronáutico Ambrosio L.V. Taravella International Airport, Ministro Pistarini International Airport, San Carlos de Bariloche Airport and Comandante Armando Tola International Airport.

== List ==
Following is a list of destinations the airline flies to, as of April 2019. Destinations in the list below are presented by country, and for each of them the cities served are provided, along with the airport served. The list also includes airports that serve either as a hub or as a focus city for the airline, as well as destinations served on a seasonal basis. Terminated destinations are also listed, yet for Aerolíneas Argentinas only.

| Country | City | Airport | Notes | Refs |
|---|---|---|---|---|
| Argentina | Bahía Blanca | Comandante Espora Airport | | |
| Argentina | Buenos Aires | Aeroparque Jorge Newbery | Hub (Note: Domestic/regional hub) | |
| Argentina | Buenos Aires | Ministro Pistarini International Airport | Hub (Note: International hub) | |
| Argentina | Catamarca | Coronel Felipe Varela International Airport | | |
| Argentina | Comodoro Rivadavia | General Enrique Mosconi International Airport | | |
| Argentina | Concordia | Concordia Airport | Terminated | |
| Argentina | Córdoba | Ingeniero Ambrosio L.V. Taravella International Airport | Focus city | |
| Argentina | Corrientes | Doctor Fernando Piragine Niveyro International Airport | | |
| Argentina | Curuzú Cuatiá | Curuzú Cuatiá Airport | Terminated | |
| Argentina | Cutral Có | Cutral Có Airport | Terminated | |
| Argentina | El Calafate | Comandante Armando Tola International Airport | | |
| Argentina | Esquel | Esquel Airport | | |
| Argentina | Formosa | Formosa International Airport | | |
| Argentina | General Roca | Dr. Arturo Umberto Illia Airport | Terminated | |
| Argentina | Gobernador Gregores | Gobernador Gregores Airport | Terminated | |
| Argentina | Gualeguaychú | Gualeguaychú Airport | Terminated | |
| Argentina | Iguazú | Cataratas del Iguazú International Airport | | |
| Argentina | Jujuy | Gobernador Horacio Guzmán International Airport | | |
| Argentina | La Cumbre | La Cumbre Airport | Terminated | |
| Argentina | La Rioja | Capitán Vicente Almandos Almonacid Airport | | |
| Argentina | Lago Argentino | Lago Argentino Airport | Terminated | |
| Argentina | Malargüe | Comodoro D. Ricardo Salomón Airport | Seasonal | |
| Argentina | Mar del Plata | Ástor Piazzolla International Airport | | |
| Argentina | Mendoza | Governor Francisco Gabrielli International Airport | | |
| Argentina | Mercedes | Mercedes Airport | Terminated | |
| Argentina | Merlo | Valle del Conlara Airport | | |
| Argentina | Monte Caseros | Monte Caseros Airport | Terminated | |
| Argentina | Neuquén | Presidente Perón International Airport | | |
| Argentina | Orán | Orán Airport | Terminated | |
| Argentina | Paraná | General Justo José de Urquiza Airport | | |
| Argentina | Paso de los Libres | Paso de los Libres Airport | Terminated | |
| Argentina | Perito Moreno | Perito Moreno Airport | Terminated | |
| Argentina | Posadas | Libertador General José de San Martín Airport | | |
| Argentina | Presidencia Roque Sáenz Peña | Presidencia Roque Sáenz Peña Airport | Terminated | |
| Argentina | Puerto Deseado | Puerto Deseado Airport | Terminated | |
| Argentina | Puerto Madryn | El Tehuelche Airport | | |
| Argentina | Reconquista | Reconquista Airport | Terminated | |
| Argentina | Resistencia | Resistencia International Airport | | |
| Argentina | Río Cuarto | Las Higueras Airport | | |
| Argentina | Río Gallegos | Piloto Civil Norberto Fernández International Airport | | |
| Argentina | Río Grande | Hermes Quijada International Airport | | |
| Argentina | Río Hondo | Las Termas Airport | | |
| Argentina | Río Turbio | Rio Turbio Airport | Terminated | |
| Argentina | Rosario | Islas Malvinas International Airport | | |
| Argentina | Salta | Martín Miguel de Güemes International Airport | | |
| Argentina | San Carlos de Bariloche | San Carlos de Bariloche Airport | | |
| Argentina | San Juan | Domingo Faustino Sarmiento Airport | | |
| Argentina | San Julián | Capitán José Daniel Vazquez Airport | Terminated | |
| Argentina | San Luis | Brigadier Mayor César Raúl Ojeda Airport | | |
| Argentina | San Martín de los Andes | Aviador Carlos Campos Airport | | |
| Argentina | San Miguel de Tucumán | Teniente General Benjamín Matienzo International Airport | | |
| Argentina | Santa Cruz | Puerto Santa Cruz Airport | Terminated | |
| Argentina | San Rafael | San Rafael Airport | | |
| Argentina | Santa Fe | Sauce Viejo Airport | | |
| Argentina | Santa Rosa | Santa Rosa Airport | | |
| Argentina | Santiago del Estero | Vicecomodoro Ángel de la Paz Aragonés Airport | | |
| Argentina | Tartagal | Tartagal "General Enrique Mosconi" Airport | Terminated | |
| Argentina | Trelew | Almirante Marcos A. Zar Airport | | |
| Argentina | Ushuaia | Malvinas Argentinas International Airport | | |
| Argentina | Viedma | Gobernador Edgardo Castello Airport | | |
| Argentina | Villa Dolores | Villa Dolores Airport | Terminated | |
| Argentina | Villa Gesell | Villa Gesell Airport | Terminated | |
| Aruba | Oranjestad | Queen Beatrix International Airport | Seasonal | |
| Australia | Melbourne | Melbourne Airport | Terminated | |
| Australia | Sydney | Sydney Airport | Terminated | |
| Bolivia | Cochabamba | Jorge Wilstermann International Airport | Terminated | |
| Bolivia | La Paz | El Alto International Airport | Terminated | |
| Bolivia | Santa Cruz de la Sierra | Viru Viru International Airport | | |
| Bolivia | Yacuiba | Yacuiba Airport | Terminated | |
| Brazil | Belo Horizonte | Tancredo Neves International Airport | Terminated | |
| Brazil | Brasília | Brasília International Airport | | |
| Brazil | Curitiba | Afonso Pena International Airport | | |
| Brazil | Florianópolis | Hercílio Luz International Airport | Terminated | |
| Brazil | Natal | Augusto Severo International Airport | Terminated | |
| Brazil | Porto Alegre | Salgado Filho International Airport | | |
| Brazil | Porto Seguro | Porto Seguro Airport | | |
| Brazil | Recife | Recife/Guararapes–Gilberto Freyre International Airport | Terminated | |
| Brazil | Rio de Janeiro | Rio de Janeiro/Galeão International Airport | | |
| Brazil | Salvador | Deputado Luís Eduardo Magalhães International Airport | | |
| Brazil | São Paulo | São Paulo/Guarulhos International Airport | | |
| Brazil | São Paulo | São Paulo–Congonhas Airport | Terminated | |
| Brazil | São Paulo | Viracopos International Airport | Terminated | |
| Canada | Montreal | Montréal–Mirabel International Airport | Terminated | |
| Canada | Toronto | Toronto Pearson International Airport | Terminated | |
| Chile | Antofagasta | Cerro Moreno International Airport | Terminated | |
| Chile | Punta Arenas | Presidente Carlos Ibáñez del Campo International Airport | Terminated | |
| Chile | Santiago | Arturo Merino Benítez International Airport | | |
| Chile | Santiago | Los Cerrillos Airport | Airport closed | |
| Colombia | Bogotá | El Dorado International Airport | | |
| Cuba | Havana | José Martí International Airport | Terminated | |
| Dominican Republic | Punta Cana | Punta Cana International Airport | | |
| Ecuador | Guayaquil | José Joaquín de Olmedo International Airport | Terminated | |
| France | Paris | Charles de Gaulle Airport | Terminated | |
| France | Paris | Orly Airport | Terminated | |
| Germany | Frankfurt | Frankfurt Airport | Terminated | |
| Hong Kong | Hong Kong | Kai Tak Airport | Airport closed | |
| Italy | Rome | Rome Fiumicino Airport | | |
| Mexico | Cancún | Cancún International Airport | | |
| Mexico | Mexico City | Mexico City International Airport | Terminated | |
| Netherlands | Amsterdam | Amsterdam Airport Schiphol | Terminated | |
| New Zealand | Auckland | Auckland Airport | Terminated | |
| Panama | Panama City | Tocumen International Airport | Terminated | |
| Paraguay | Asunción | Silvio Pettirossi International Airport | | |
| Peru | Lima | Jorge Chávez International Airport | | |
| Portugal | Lisbon | Lisbon Airport | Terminated | |
| Puerto Rico | San Juan | Luis Muñoz Marín International Airport | Terminated | |
| Senegal | Dakar | Léopold Sédar Senghor International Airport | Terminated | |
| South Africa | Cape Town | Cape Town International Airport | Terminated | |
| Spain | Barcelona | Josep Tarradellas Barcelona–El Prat Airport | Terminated | |
| Spain | Madrid | Madrid–Barajas Airport | | |
| Spain | Santiago de Compostela | Santiago de Compostela Airport | Terminated | |
| Switzerland | Zürich | Zurich Airport | Terminated | |
| Trinidad and Tobago | Port of Spain | Piarco International Airport | Terminated | |
| United Kingdom | London | Heathrow Airport | Terminated | |
| United States | Los Angeles | Los Angeles International Airport | Terminated | |
| United States | Miami | Miami International Airport | | |
| United States | New York City | John F. Kennedy International Airport | Terminated | |
| United States | Orlando | Orlando International Airport | Terminated | |
| Uruguay | Montevideo | Carrasco International Airport | | |
| Uruguay | Punta del Este | Capitán de Corbeta Carlos A. Curbelo International Airport | | |
| Venezuela | Caracas | Simón Bolívar International Airport | Terminated | |
