= Governor Gregory =

Governor Gregory may refer to:

- John Munford Gregory (1804–1884), Acting Governor of Virginia from 1842 to 1843
- William Gregory (Rhode Island governor) (1849–1901), 46th Governor of Rhode Island
- William Henry Gregory (1817–1892), 14th Governor of British Ceylon

== See also ==
- Christine Gregoire (born 1947), 22nd Governor of Washington
- Gobernador Gregores, Santa Cruz, Argentina
  - Gobernador Gregores Airport
