= Cazadores Correntinos =

- Village
- Location of Cazadores Correntinos in Argentina
- Coordinates: 29°58′51″S 58°17′59″W
- Country: Argentina
- Province: Corrientes
- Department: Curuzú Cuatiá

Population (2001)
  - Total: 473
- Time zone: UTC−3 (ART)

Cazadores Correntinos is a village and railway station in the Curuzú Cuatiá Department, Corrientes Province, Argentina. According to the 2001 population census conducted by INDEC its population was 473 inhabitants. Administratively it depends on Curuzú Cuatiá Township, whose town centre is approximately 38 km to the northeast by road. The main mode of communication is the Provincial Route 77, which joins the Provincial Route 126 to the north of the village and links it to Curuzú Cuatiá in the northeast and Sauce in the southwest.
