= Curuzú Cuatiá Department =

Curuzú Cuatiá Department Departamento Curuzú Cuatiá (Spanish) Tetãvore Kurusu Kuatia (Guarani)
- Department
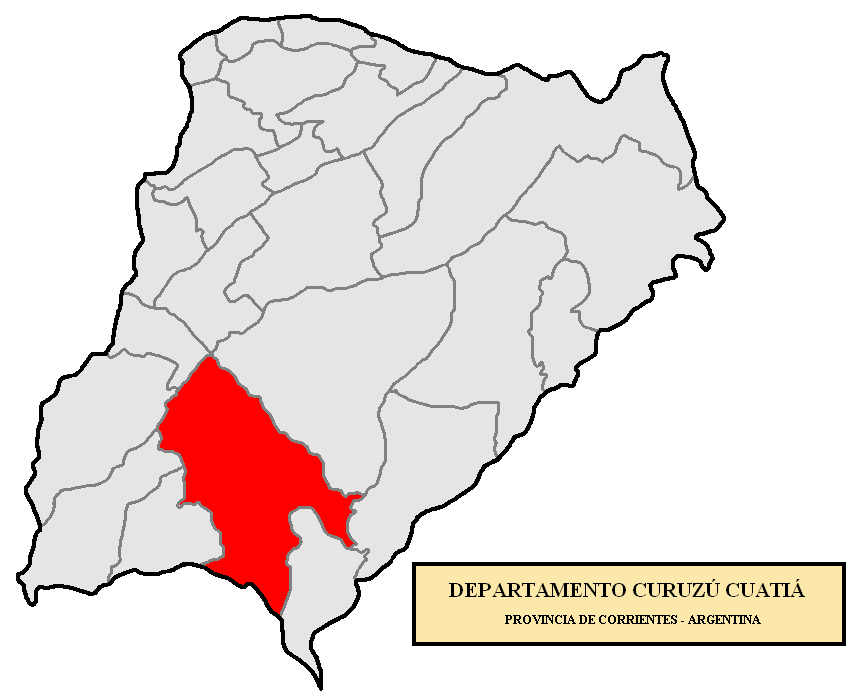
- location of Curuzú Cuatía Department in Corrientes Province
- Coordinates: 29°47′S 58°02′W
- Country: Argentina
- Seat: Curuzú Cuatiá

Area
  - Total: 8,911 km^{2} (3,441 sq mi)

Population (2001 census [INDEC])
  - Total: 42,075
  - Density: 4.722/km^{2} (12.23/sq mi)
- Demonym: curuzucuateña/o
- Postal Code: W3460
- Area Code: 03774
- Website: www.curuzu.gov.ar

Curuzú Cuatiá Department is a department of Corrientes Province in Argentina.

The provincial subdivision has a population of about 42,075 inhabitants in an area of 8,911 km^{2} (3,441 sq mi), and its capital city is Curuzú Cuatiá, which is located around 650 km (400 mi) from Capital Federal.

== Settlements and villages ==
- Cazadores Correntinos
- Curuzú Cuatiá
- Perugorría
