= Perito Moreno Glacier =

Glacier located in the Patagonian Andes

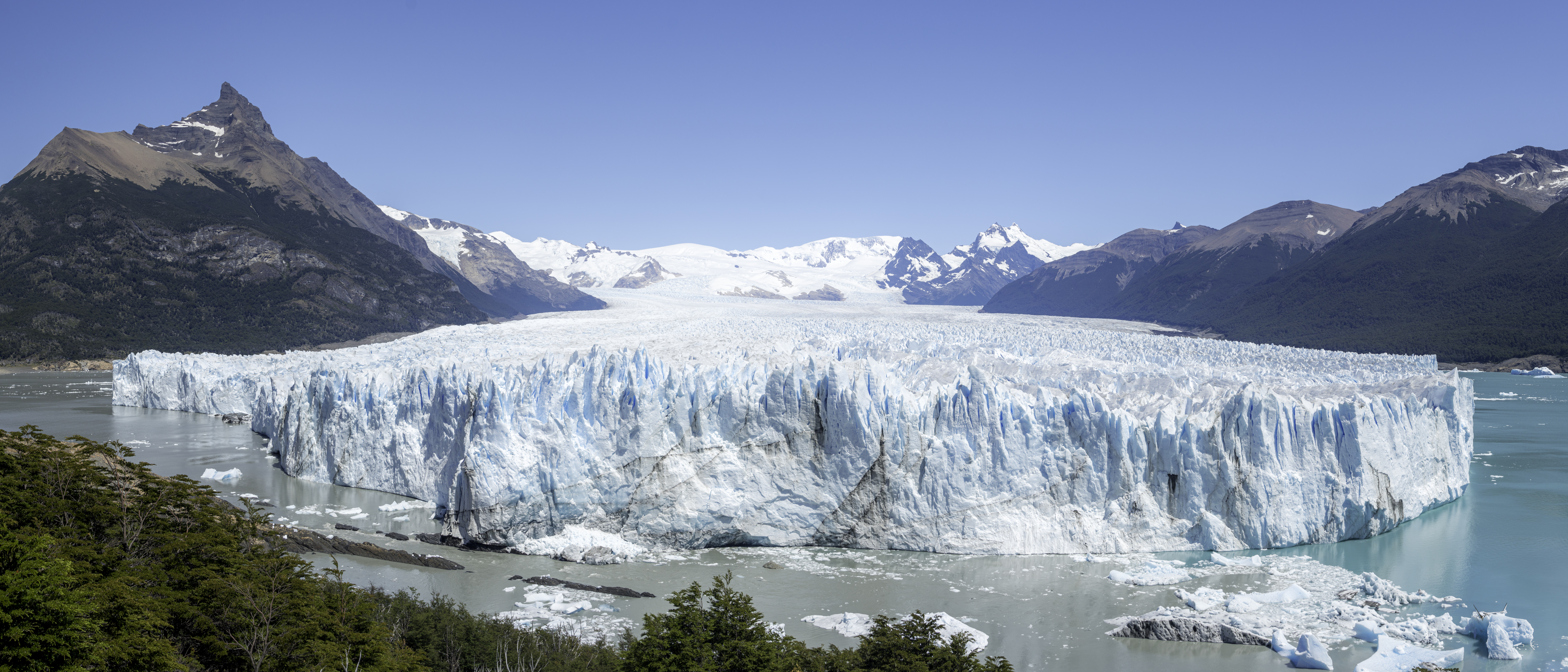
- The terminus of the glacier in Lago Argentino

- Location within Southern Patagonia
- Coordinates: 50°30′S 73°08′W
- Area: 250 km^{2} (97 sq mi)
- Length: 30 km (19 mi)
- Width: 5 km (3 mi)
- Thickness: 170 m (560 ft)
- Terminus: Lago Argentino
- Status: Retreating

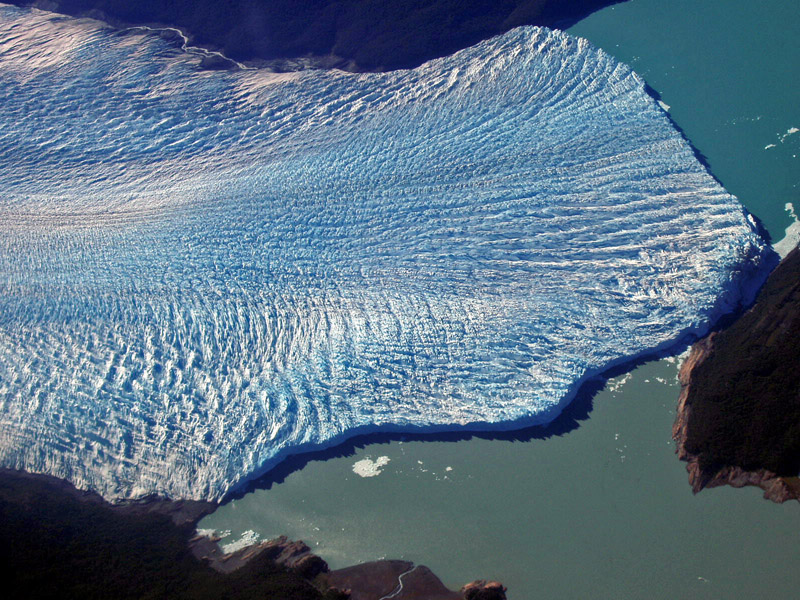
Aerial view of the glacier, taken two weeks before the 2004 rupture

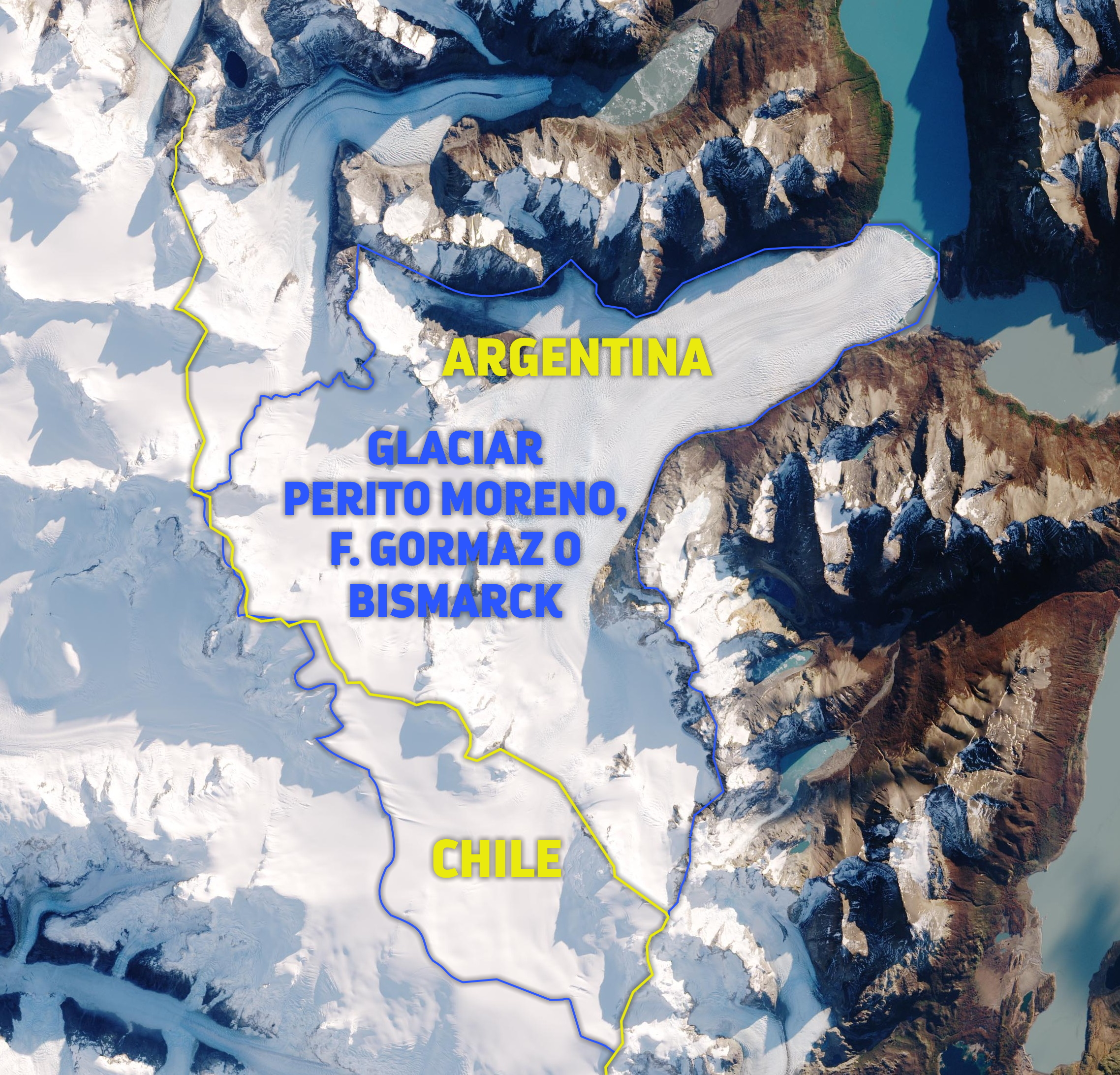
Map of the glacier with the internation border made in 1998.

The Perito Moreno (Spanish: Glaciar Perito Moreno), Francisco Gormaz or Bismarck Glacier is a glacier located in Los Glaciares National Park in southwest Santa Cruz Province, Argentina, and originated in the Magallanes Region in Chile, being also part of the Bernardo O'Higgins National Park. It is one of the most important tourist attractions in the Argentine Patagonia.

The 250 km^{2} (97 sq mi) ice formation, 30 km (19 mi) in length, is one of 48 glaciers fed by the Southern Patagonian Ice Field located in the Andes system shared with Chile which has a small part of the origins of the glacier. This ice field is the world's third largest reserve of fresh water.

The Perito Moreno Glacier, located 78 kilometres (48 mi) from El Calafate, was named after the explorer Francisco Moreno, a pioneer who studied the region in the 19th century and played a major role in defending the Argentinian thesis in the 1902 Arbitral award of the Andes between Argentina and Chile.

== Status ==
Since 2020 the glacier has been retreating on its northern front, possibly due to climate change. It was previously one of the few unusual glaciers that maintained a state of equilibrium during the late 20th and early 21st centuries because it was accumulating mass at a rate similar to that of its loss. The reason for its unusually long period of stability remains debated by glaciologists.

The terminus of the Perito Moreno Glacier is 5 km (3.1 mi) wide, with an average height of 74 m (240 ft) above the surface of the water of Argentino Lake, in Argentina. It has a total ice depth of 170 metres (558 ft).

== History ==
In 1879, the British Chilean Navy captain, Juan Tomás Rogers, was the first non-indigenous person to sight the glacier which he named "Francisco Gormaz", after the Director of the Hydrographic Office of the Chilean Navy, sponsoring organization of the discovering expedition. Some years later, Rudolph Hauthal, attached to the Argentine Boundary Commission, saw the glacier and decided to name it "Bismarck" in honor of the Prussian Chancellor.

In 1881, the Boundary Treaty between Chile and Argentina was signed, which defined the boundaries of both countries in the Andes mountain range up to the 52nd parallel. The glacier is east of the Andes Mountains and empties into Lake Argentino, which also is under Argentine sovereignty. Before the treaty, the area was in dispute between both countries during the East Patagonia, Tierra del Fuego and Strait of Magellan Dispute.

Finally, in 1899, after long years of research, compilation of archaeological material, and surveys of the area, Lieutenant Iglesias, who was in charge of the studies for the Argentine Hydrographic Institute, named the glacier Perito Moreno in homage to Francisco Moreno.

With the Southern Patagonian Ice Field dispute, its origin was in dispute until the signing of the 1998 agreement where the line that was set crosses the origin of the glacier leaving a small part in Chile and all the rest in Argentina.

== Rupture ==
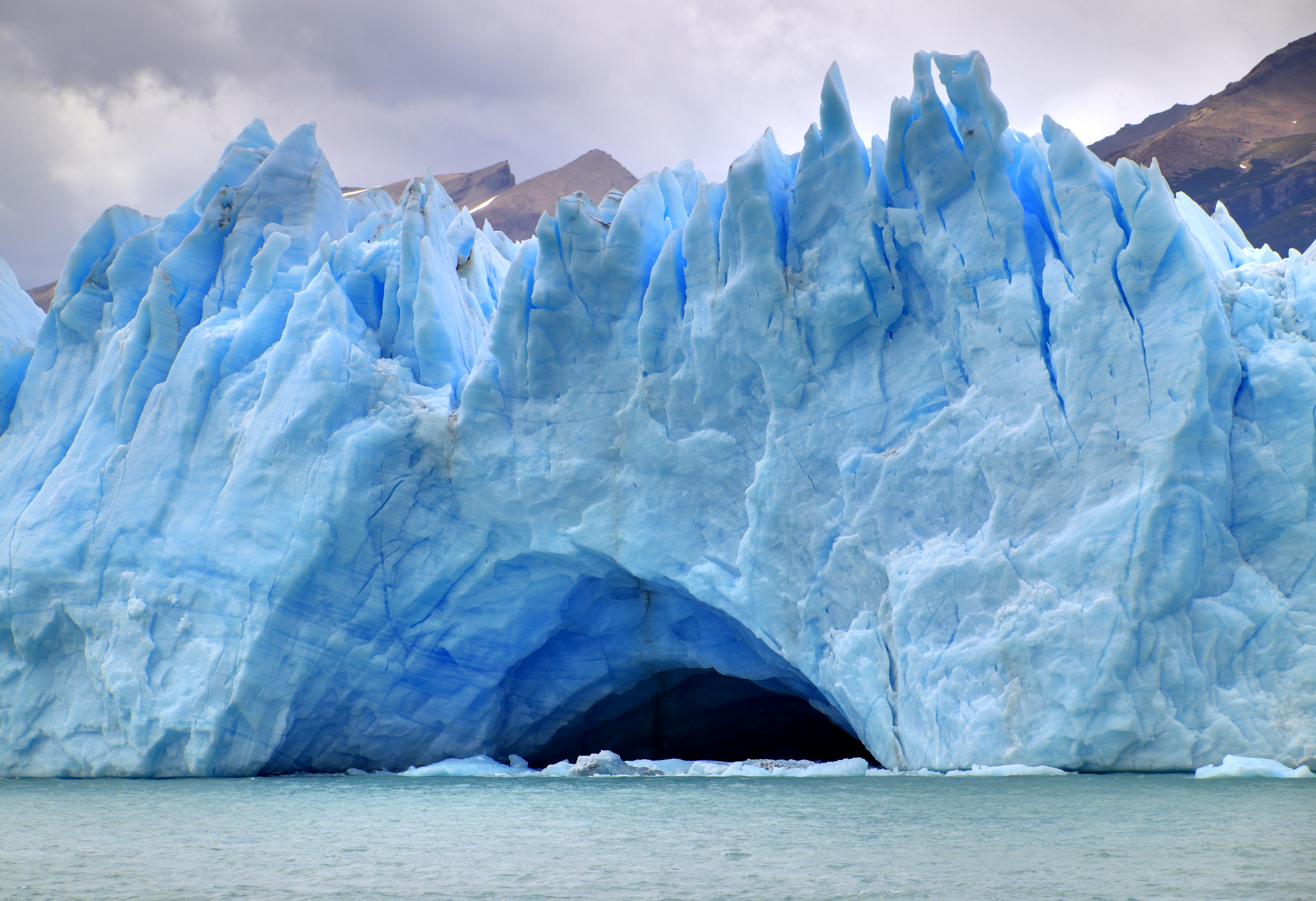
A glacier cave at the edge of the glacier

Pressure from the weight of the ice slowly pushes the glacier over the inner fjord of Lake Argentino reaching the coast of Península de Magallanes and bisecting the lake at an area called the Brazo Rico (Rico Arm) on one side and the Canal de los Témpanos (Iceberg Channel) on the other. With no outlet, the water level on the Brazo Rico side of the lake can rise by as much as 30 meters above the level of the main body of Argentino Lake. Intermittently, the pressure produced by the height of the dammed water breaks through the ice barrier causing a spectacular rupture, sending a massive outpouring of water from the Brazo Rico section to the main body of Lake Argentino and the Santa Cruz river. As the water exits Brazo Rico, the scored shoreline is exposed, showing evidence of the height of the water build-up. This dam–ice-bridge–rupture cycle recurs naturally between once a year and less than once every decade.

The glacier advances between June and December and recedes between December and April. The formation of an ice barrier is a complex process, since there is a feedback mechanism between the glacier and the lake, which affects the oscillations of the position of the glacial front in a fairly stable way.

Different behaviors have been observed during the filling and in the processes of discharge of the water, which have been classified into three types: sudden, progressive and minor burst. In a sudden type event, the maximum discharge can reach 8000 m³ per second, while a smaller event only evacuates 123 m³.

The ruptures do not have a specific frequency. Traditionally it was estimated one every three or four years, but there have been times where they happened in shorter periods and others in which it did not occur for many years, causing fears that the phenomenon might possibly have stopped occurring.

The ruptures occurred in the years, 1917, 1935, 1940, 1942, 1947, 1952, 1953, 1956, 1960, 1963, 1966, 1970, 1972, 1975, 1977, 1980, 1984, 1988, 2004, 2006, 2008, 2012, 2013 (two events, one in January and one in December), 2016, 2018 and 2019.

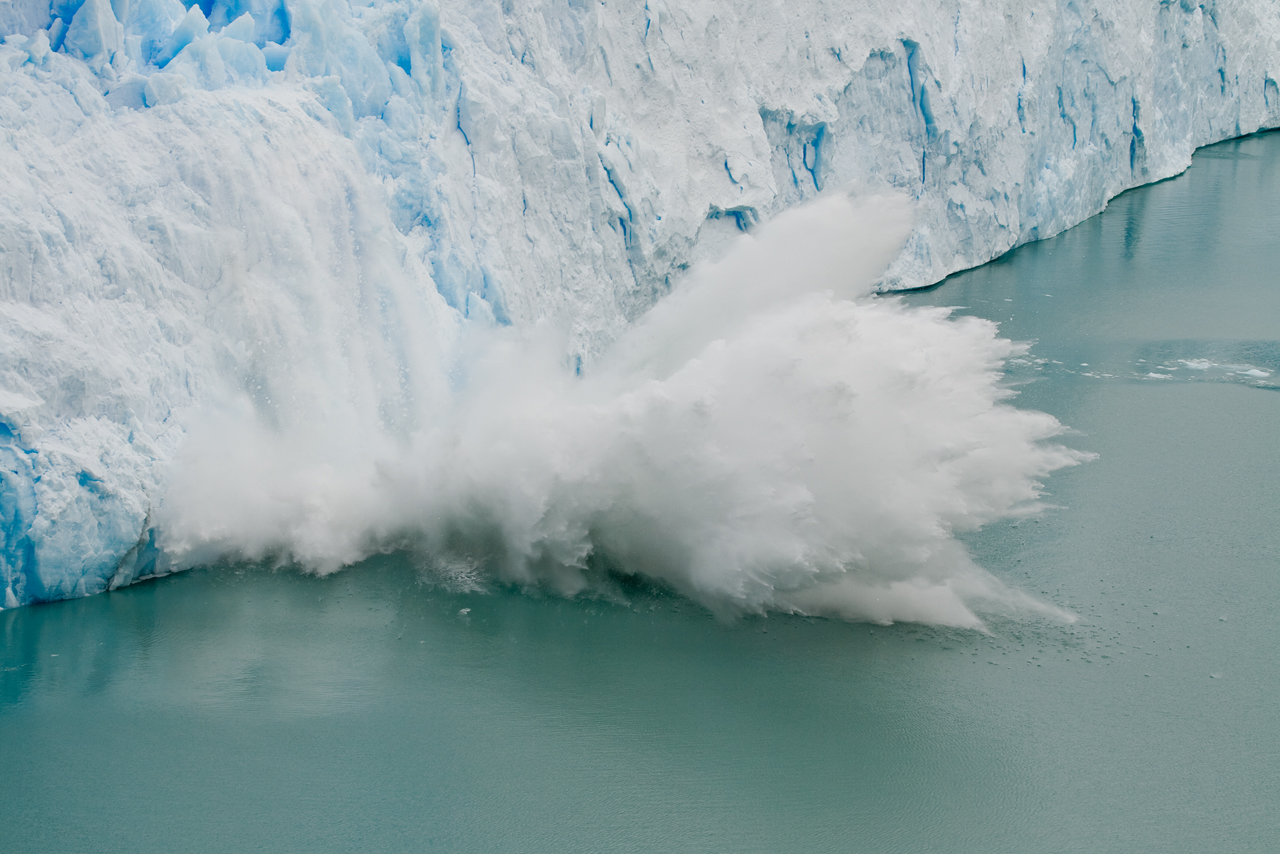
Glacier calving happens when large chunks of ice collapse into the body of water as the glacier advances

=== The first recorded rupture (1917) ===
Evidence from tree rings on the shorelines indicates that there were no major damming and rupture events of the Brazo Rico from about 1635 until the 20th century. The front of the glacier began to move towards the opposite bank at the end of the 19th century. In 1899 it was 750 meters from the Magallanes peninsula. In the first five years of the twentieth century it continued its progression, managing to close its arm for the first time in 1917, followed by the first break.

=== Sudden discharge ruptures ===
In the 21st century, the events of 2004, 2006, 2008 and 2012 are classified as sudden download events.

In 2004, the peak level of the dammed lake was 10.5 m and discharge flow peak had a value of 5000 m³ / s, finishing with matching lake levels after four days. It was estimated that 10,000 tourists watched this event. In 2006 the level difference reached by the Rico arm was 5.4 m and on 10 March, the retained water began to escape, which caused the dike to collapse on the 13th. The discharge rate rose to 5850 m³ / s, concluding the discharge period on March 14, when the levels of the Rico arm matched the rest of the lake. In the 2008 event, the discharge flow had a peak value of 8000 m³ / s, finishing with matching lake levels after about four days. At the 2012 event, the discharge flow peak had a value lower than the previous ones, 2000 m³ / s, so it took longer to evacuate the accumulated water, concluding only after 14 days.

=== Progressive discharge ruptures ===
In progressive unloading events the whole process slows down, although an ice set-up occurs.

In the southern summer of 2013 there was an event of this type. By September 9, 2012, the front of the glacier had shortened the distance that separated it from the coast of the Magallanes peninsula to only 30 meters, which had caused the Rico arm to accumulate water, reaching a maximum level of 2.2 m on November 21, when the water managed to overcome the ice wall by opening a subglacial tunnel, beginning the discharge process. Tunnel formation was visible directly on day 26 and subsequently the tunnel collapsed. On February 4, 2013, the discharge flow reached a maximum value: 205 m³ / s. The discharge continued, albeit in a very slow way, as a result of new semi-clogging, so it was just completed, when both levels were the same, 85 days after it started. The distance between the glacier wall and the peninsula was over 100 m towards the beginning of March. At the end of December 2013 there was another event of the progressive type with similar characteristics to what had happened the previous year. The level of Lake Rico reached a difference of 3.7 m and the evacuation of the liquid lasted 65 days, reaching a maximum discharge flow of 220 m³ / s.

=== Minor discharge ruptures ===
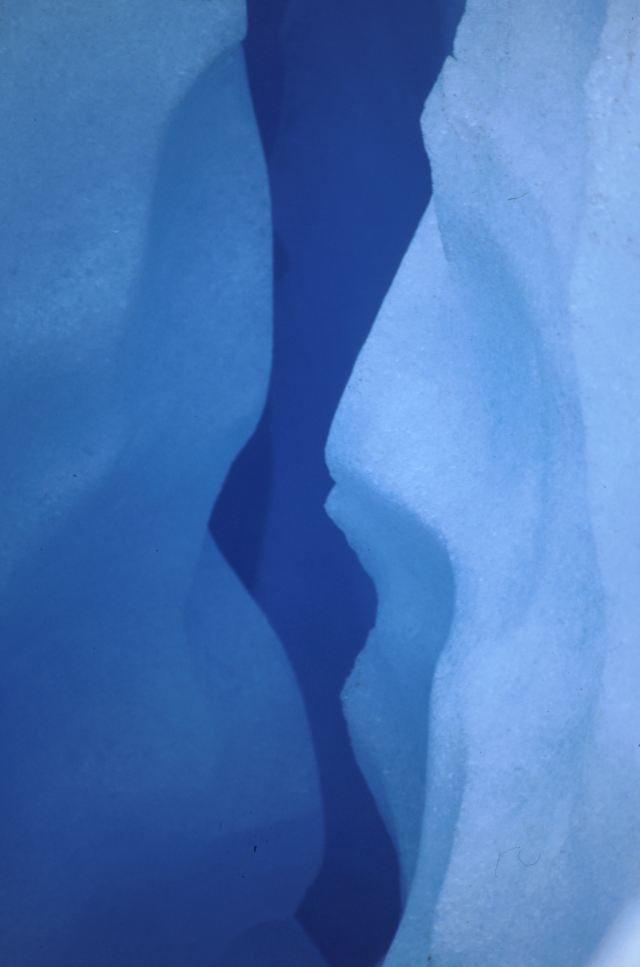
Crevasse in Perito Moreno Glacier, 1994

Occasionally, the glacial front does not completely obstruct the natural passage of water with an ice dam, but it approaches close enough to prevent water from passing freely, so without reaching elevation, an arm cut in Rico occurs. These events are classified as minor downloads. This is what happened in October 1996, when the Rico arm rose about a meter. At the end of that month the water pressure opened a greater passage in the walls of the glacial front and the discharge began, but slowly, since the passage had not been sufficiently open, so the maximum peak of the discharge flow occurred at the end of January with a value of 123 m³ / s, the dimensions being equalized on both sides only at the beginning of April.8 The events of 1994, 1995 and 1997 show similar behavior and magnitudes to those of 1996.

=== Other featured events ===
The phenomenon was presented again in 1935. At the close of 1939, due to the flooding caused by the embalmed waters, which affected numerous agricultural establishments, and without even glimpsing the economic value that from the point of view this natural event could represent tourism, the Argentine Navy Ministry launched explosives on the ice indication, unable to obtain the intended result of artificially consolidating a gap for the evacuation of water. The break occurred naturally in February of the following year. In 1952 the closure produced a flooded area of 6670 ha; It affected fields of crops and livestock, but not buildings.

The rupture of 1966 was the one that produced one of the largest volumes of water evacuated by the Santa Cruz River, which exceeded 2000 m³ per second, measured at the Charles Fuhr capacity station.

== Tourism ==
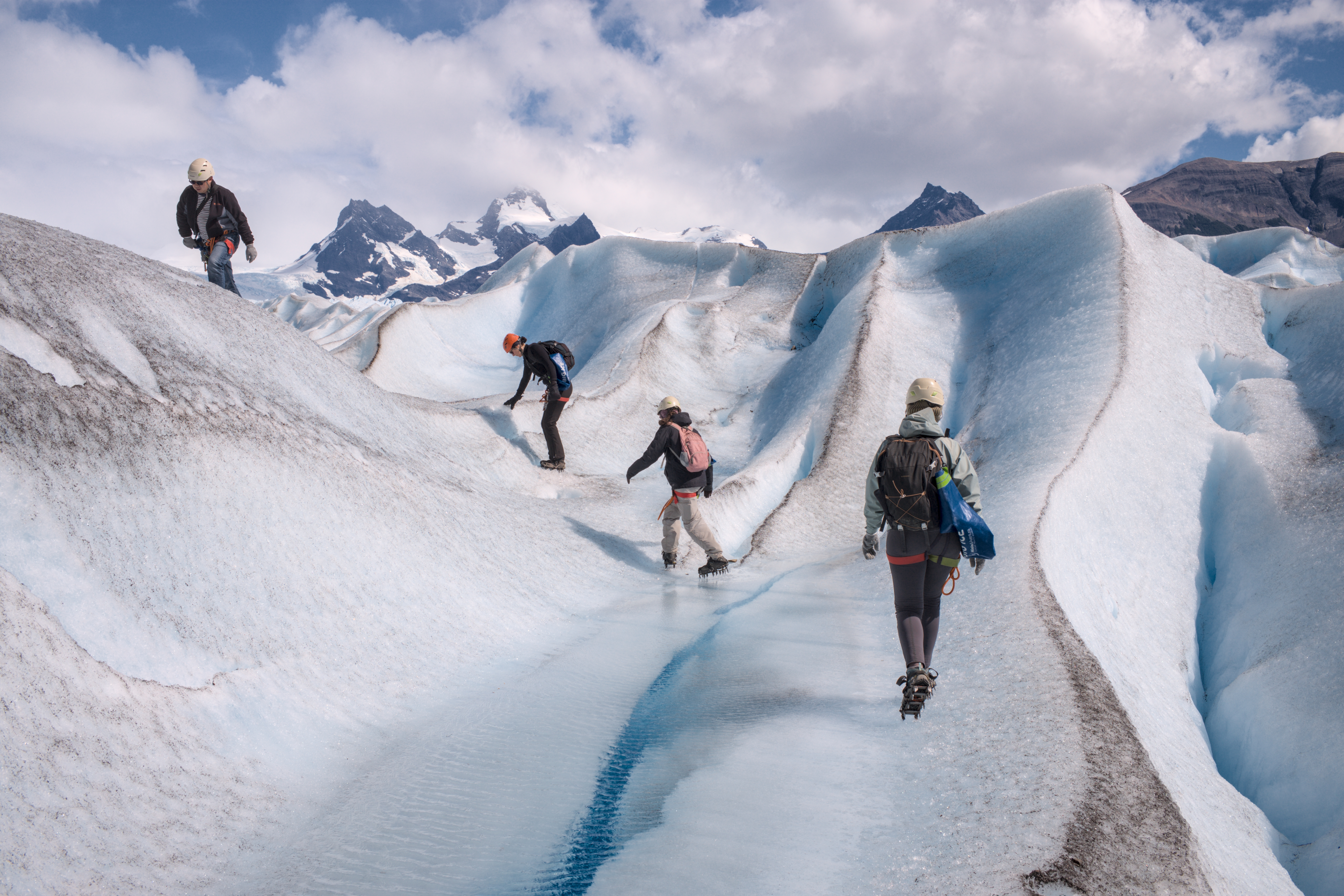
People participating in a guided tour on the glacier in 2026.

Due to its size and accessibility, Perito Moreno is one of the major tourist attractions in southern Patagonia and the rupture of this glacier is considered one of the most impressive natural spectacles in the world. As the Zone closes to the public during the night - after 8 pm - on some occasions the ice bridge collapses without spectators, as happened in the event of March 11, 2018.

The rupture events benefit the area by producing enormous international visibility, which translates into sources of income for the region's growing tourism development, which has its support base in the city of El Calafate. The city has an international airport, as well as many tour companies running daily tours. A large visitor centre inside the Los Glaciares national park features a walking circuit which allows visitors to view the southern flank and the east-facing edge of the glacier. Tour companies also offer boat tours on the Lago Argentino, passing by the northern flank of the glacier. In recent years, trekking tours on the ice have gained popularity. The two standard tours are a "mini-trekking" option, consisting of a short walk of about an hour and a half, and a "big ice" version, which is usually about five hours. Tour companies generally provide crampons to customers.

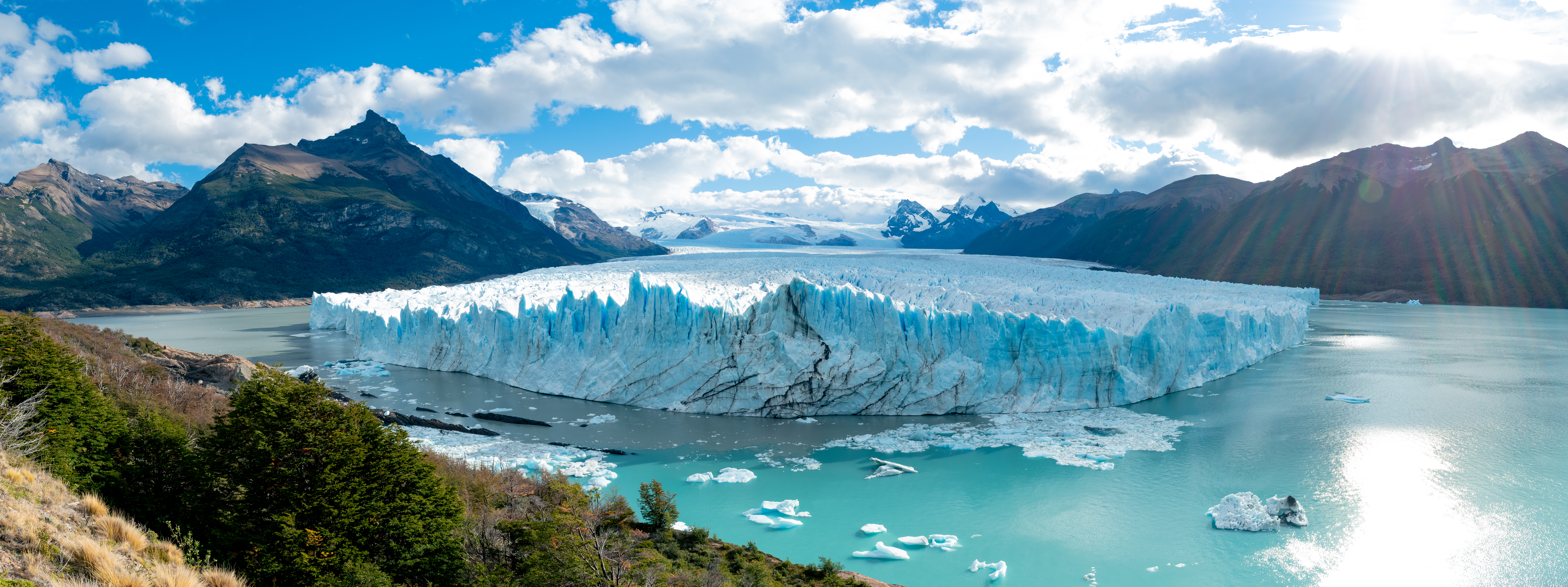
Panoramic view of the glacier taken from the walkway next to the visitor center

== Fauna ==
A small glacier stonefly called Andiperla willinki inhabits the glacier. Also called "the pearl of the Andes" or "dragon of Patagonia" is a kind of plecoptera of the family Gripopterygidae that inhabits the Patagonian glaciers in Argentina and Chile, spending its entire life on the ice. It measures approximately 1.5 cm (0.59 in) and feeds on bacteria, brought by the wind, that live on the ice.

It was found on the Upsala Glacier and described by Aubert Willink in 1956. Due to its rarity, small size, and extreme habitat, they believed it had become extinct. However, it was rediscovered in 2001 in a Torres del Paine glacier in a 20 m deep recess; on this occasion, it was named by the crew as "Patagonian dragon".
