= Puerto Bandera =

Coordinates: 50°18′S 72°47′W

- Municipality and village
- Interactive map of Puerto Bandera
- Country: Argentina
- Province: Santa Cruz Province
- Department: Lago Argentino Department
- Time zone: UTC−3 (ART)
- Climate: Cfb

Puerto Bandera is a settlement and municipality located on the shores of Lago Argentino lake, in Santa Cruz Province, southern Argentina.
