= National University of the Chaco Austral =

Coordinates: 26°48′04″S 60°26′47″W

- Universidad Nacional del Chaco Austral
- Type: Public
- Established: December 26, 2007
- Rector: Ing. Walter Gustavo López
- Academic staff: 60
- Students: 1,900
- Address: Comandante Fernández 755, H3700LGO, Sáenz Peña, Chaco Province, Argentina
- Website: www.uncaus.edu.ar

The National University of the Chaco Austral (Universidad Nacional del Chaco Austral - UNCAus) is a very recently established national university located in Sáenz Peña, a city in the agrarian, central section of Chaco Province, Argentina. It was established in 2007 by an initiative of Governor Jorge Capitanich, and was included as part of a plan to geographically diversify Argentina's National University system; as such, its installations consist of the former local campus of the National University of the Northeast, notably the School of Agronomy and Forestry, and new additions.
