= Lago Argentino Airport =

Airport in Argentina

- IATA: ING; ICAO: SAWA

Summary
- Airport type: Closed
- Location: Lago Argentino, Argentina
- Elevation AMSL: 731 ft (223 m)
- Coordinates: 50°20′08″S 72°14′55″W

Map
- Location in Argentina

Runways
Direction	Length		Surface
Direction	m	ft	Surface
Closed
- Source: Google Maps OurAirports

Lago Argentino Airport (IATA: ING, ICAO: SAWA), was an airport in Lago Argentino, Argentina.

This airport was closed in 2006, replaced by Comandante Armando Tola International Airport, 16 kilometres (10 mi) northeast. The old air terminal building now serves as the main bus terminal for El Calafate.

== Former Airlines and destinations ==
Airlines	Destinations
LADE	Comodoro Rivadavia, Río Gallegos, Gobernador Gregores

== See also ==
- Transport in Argentina
- List of airports in Argentina
