= La Leona River =

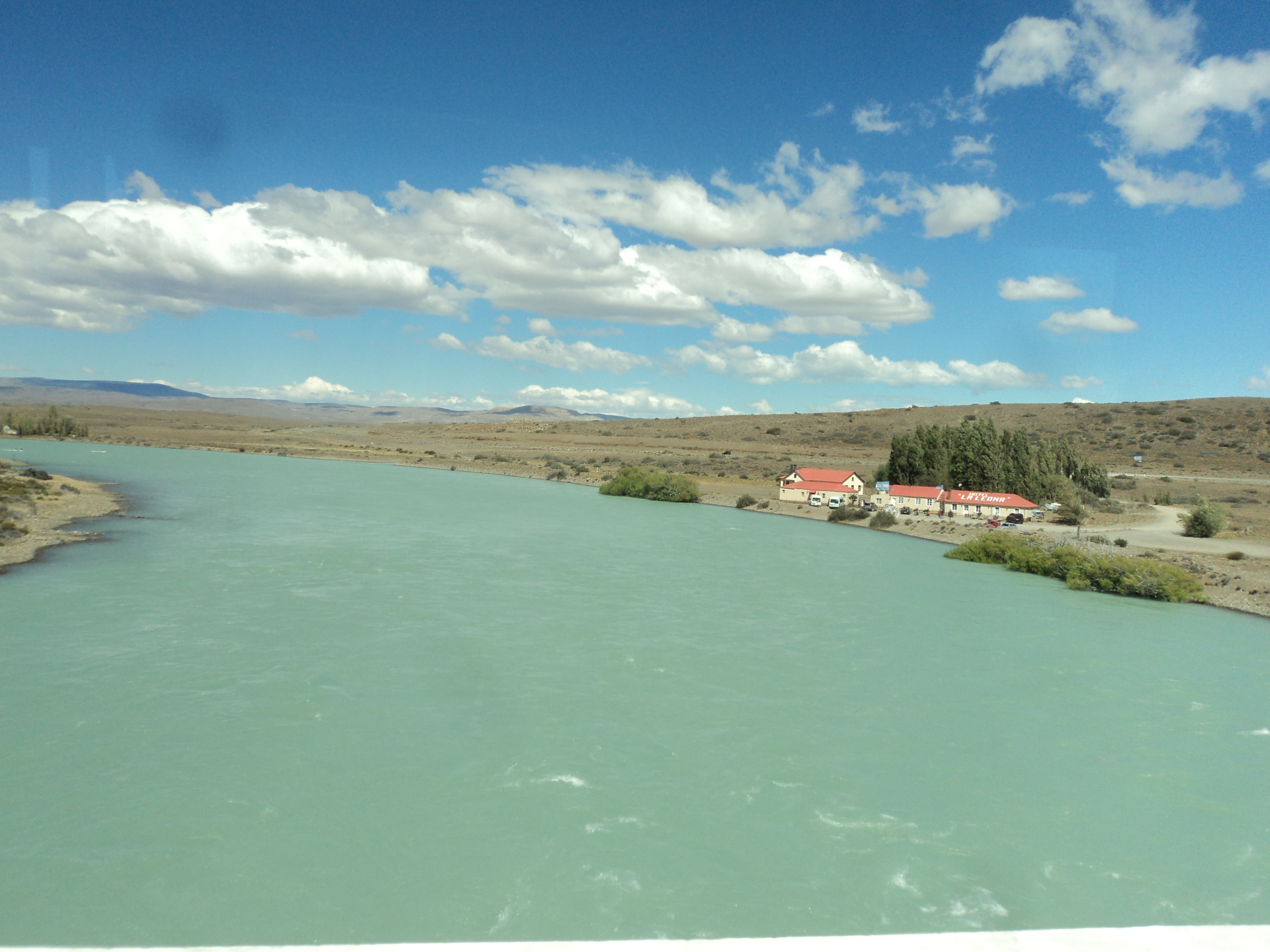

Location
- Country: Argentina

Physical characteristics
- Source
  - location: Viedma Lake
- Mouth: Argentino Lake
  - coordinates: 50°10′49″S 72°00′06″W

The La Leona River is a river of Patagonia, Argentina. It flows in the eastern part of the Los Glaciares National Park. It has its origin in southeast Lake Viedma and winds for about 50 kilometers (30 miles) through the Andes before flowing into Lake Argentino.

== See also ==
- List of rivers of Argentina
