= El Calafate =

City in Santa Cruz Province, Argentina

- Town
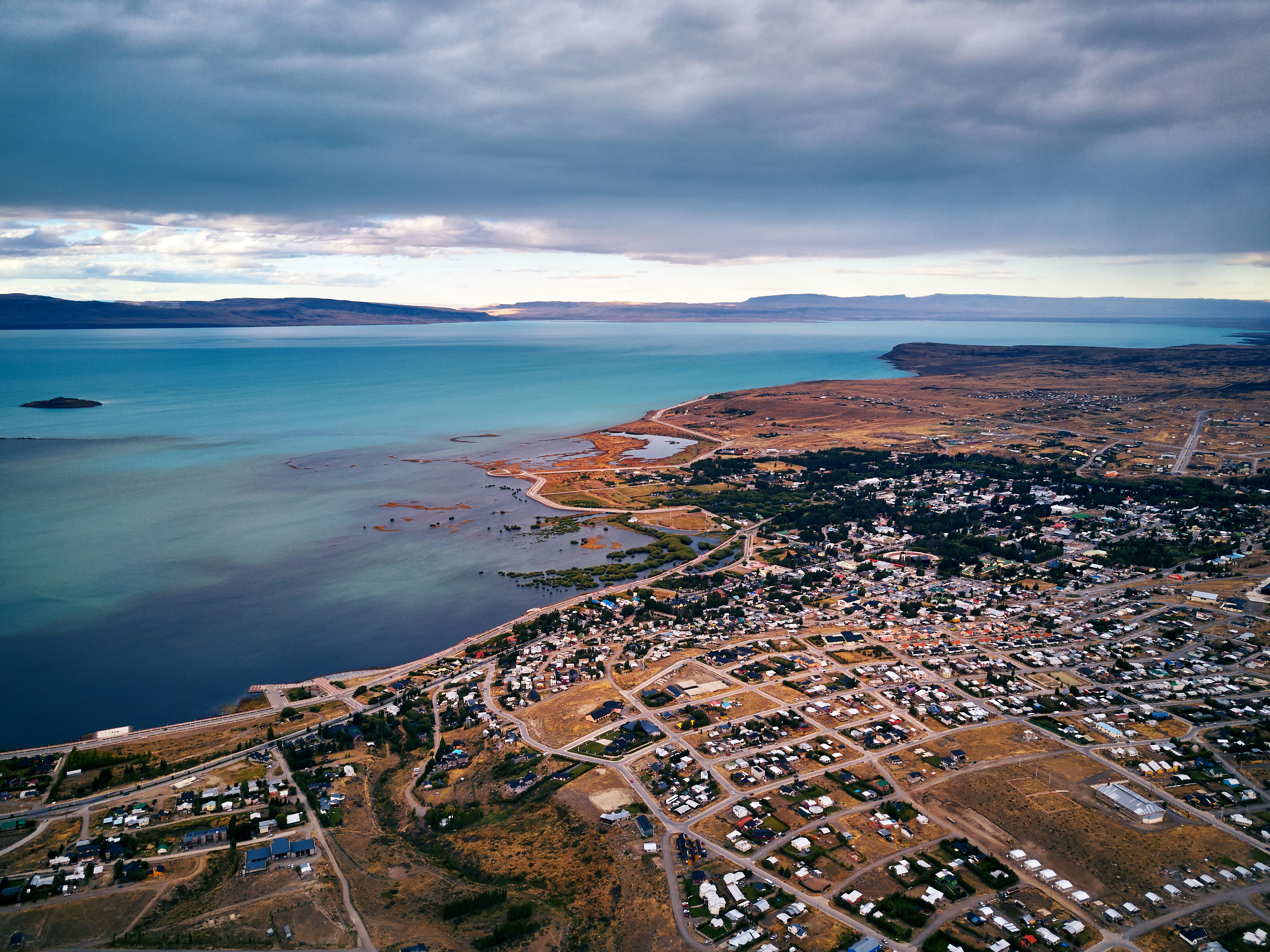

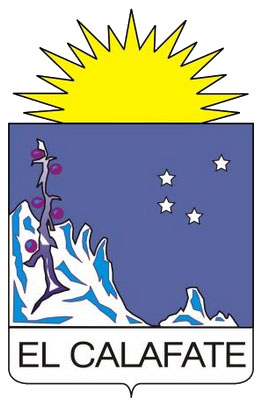
- Coat of arms

- Location of El Calafate in Argentina El Calafate (Argentina)
- Coordinates: 50°20′16″S 72°15′36″W
- Country: Argentina
- Province: Santa Cruz
- Department: Lago Argentino

Government
  - Intendant: Hector Javier Belloni

Population (2022 census)
  - Total: 22,844
- Demonym: calafateño/a
- Time zone: UTC−3 (ART)
- CPA base: Z9405
- Dialing code: +54 2965
- Climate: BSk
- Website: elcalafate.gov.ar

El Calafate, also called Calafate, is a city in the Argentine province of Santa Cruz, in Patagonia. It is located on the southern border of Lago Argentino, in the southwest part of the province (about 320 kilometres (200 mi) northwest of Río Gallegos). It is the seat of government for the Lago Argentino Department within the province. The name of the city is also the name of a small bush, with yellow flowers and dark-blue berries, that is very commonly seen in the region—the calafate (Berberis buxifolia). The word comes from the word calafate, which is Spanish for 'caulk'.

El Calafate is an important tourist destination, serving as the hub for visitors of different parts of Los Glaciares National Park, Perito Moreno Glacier, Cerro Chaltén, and Cerro Torre, in addition to the area surrounding Lago Argentino.

== History ==
The modern history of El Calafate began in the initial decades of the 20th century, when the area was simply a sheltering place for wool traders. The town was officially founded in 1927 by the government of Argentina in a bid to promote settlement, but it was the creation of nearby Perito Moreno National Park (1937) that sparked growth and the building of better road access. Over the course of the 20th century, increased international travel (and ecotourism, in particular) fueled socioeconomic growth to the area, and raised the population by tens of thousands.

== Transport ==
The 220 kilometers separating Calafate from El Chaltén on the other side of the Lake Argentino in the national park are paved, as well as the 315 kilometres to Río Gallegos. Other distances are: to Bariloche 1400 km; to Esquel 1108 km (some dirt road); Comodoro Rivadavia 959 km; Puerto Madryn 1388 km; Buenos Aires 2727 km; Ushuaia 863 km.

Calafate is served by El Calafate International Airport (IATA: FTE, ICAO: SAWC) located some 20 km to the east of the city.

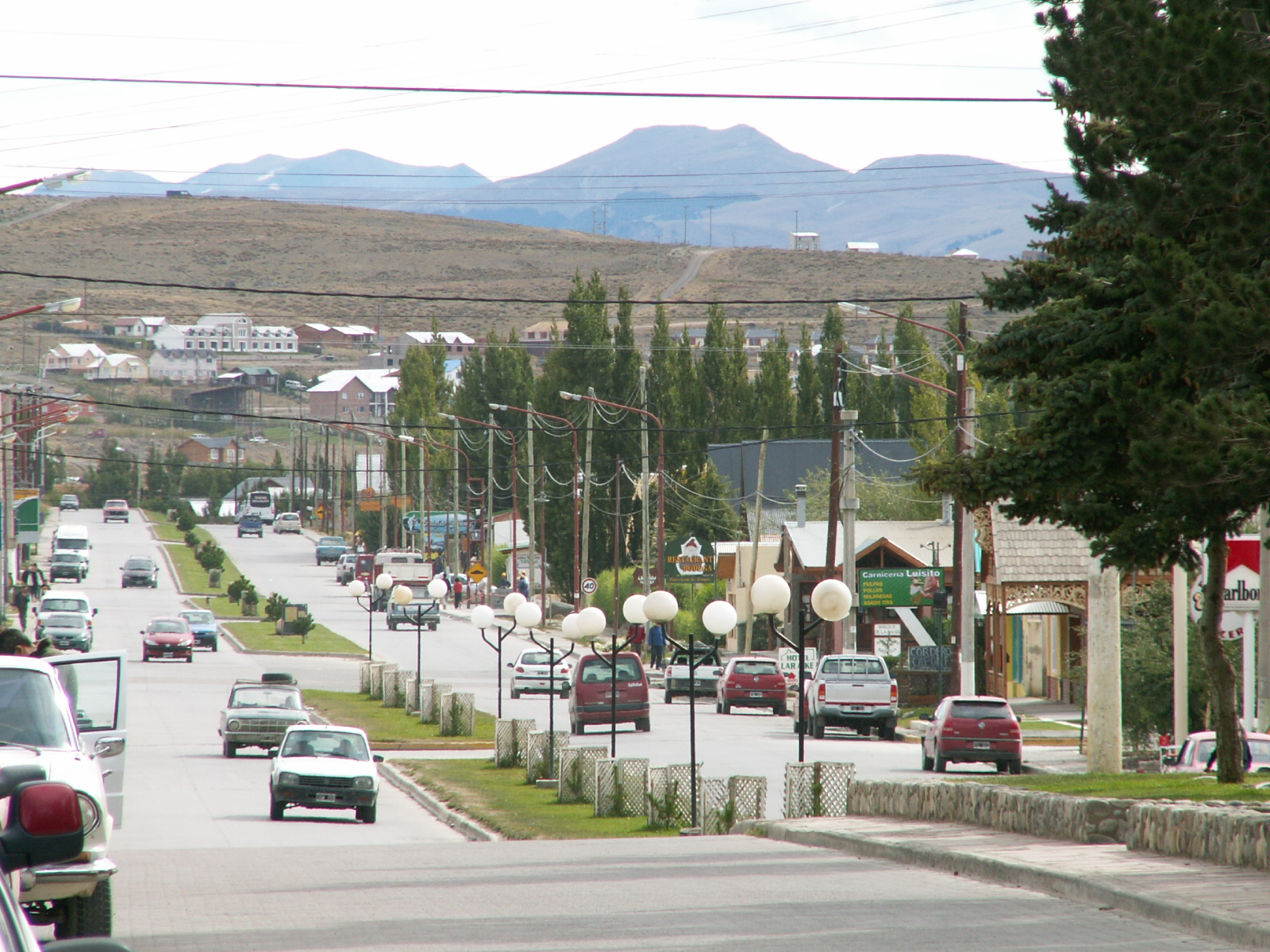
Avenida del Libertador, the town's main street

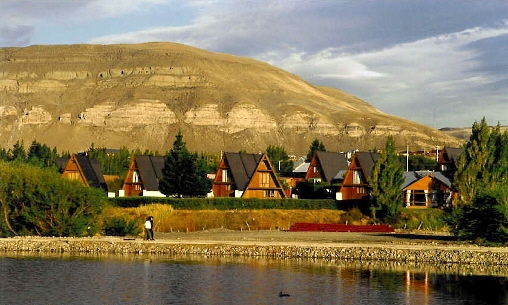
Residential section of the city

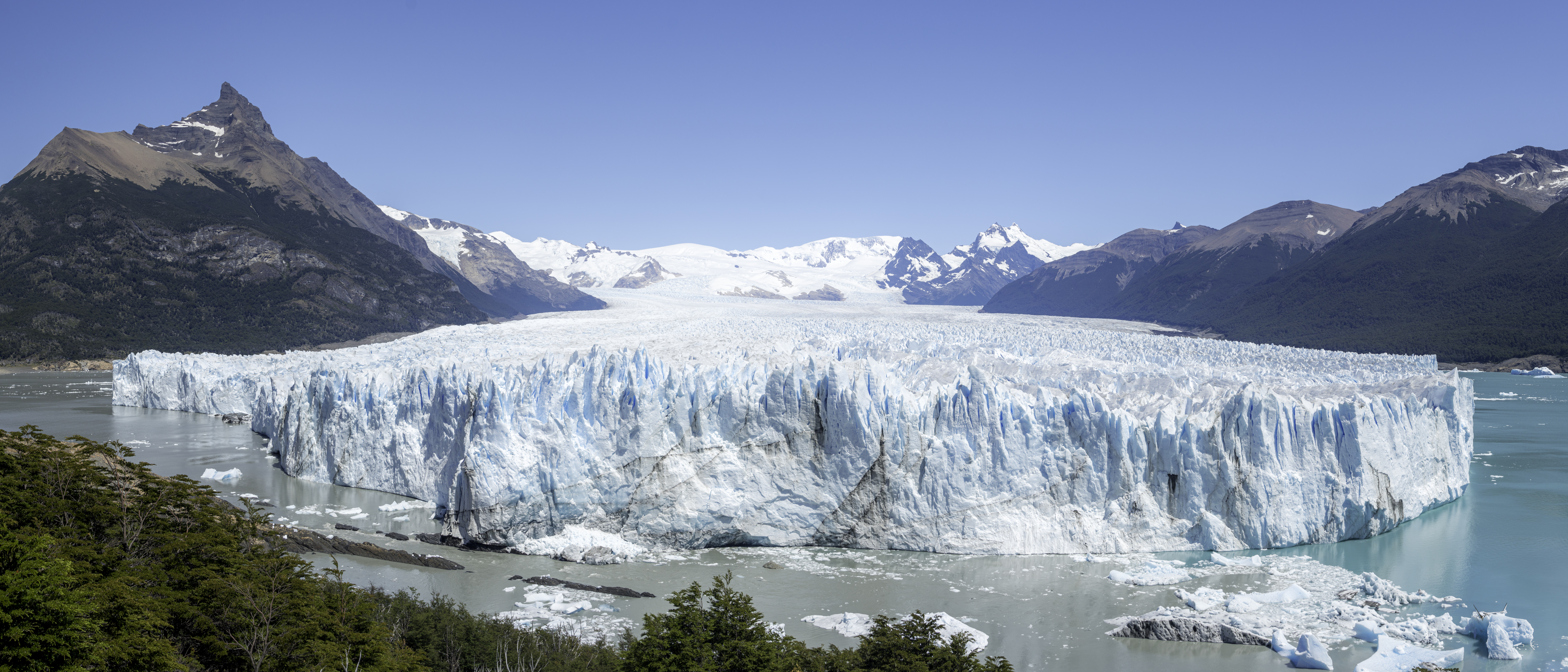
El Calafate is located near Los Glaciares National Park

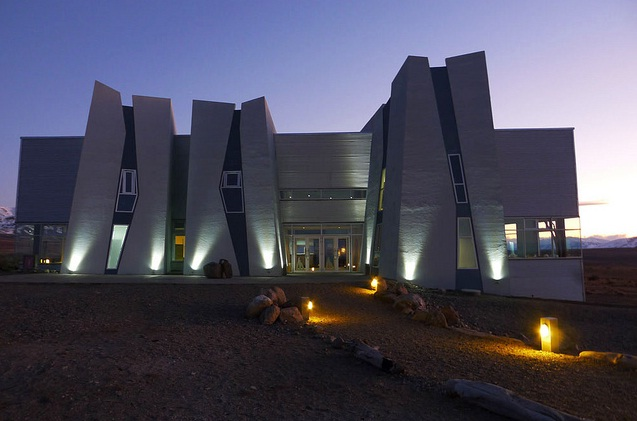
Glacier Research Center

== Population ==
There were 6,410 permanent residents were counted in the (2001 census [INDEC]). This represents a 106% increase compared with the 1991 census of 3,101. However, due to the expansion of tourism, the population was 16,655 in 2010 and 22,844 in the 2022 census, thus containing over 89% of the population of the department. It is also referred to as "Lago Argentino" in 2022 and earlier census documents.

== Wildlife ==
Chilean flamingos (Phoenicopterus chilensis) are regularly visible from El Calafate congregating in the waters of Lago Argentino at the north shoreline near Estancia La Querencia.

== Climate ==
El Calafate experiences a cold semi-arid climate (Köppen BSk) with cool to warm, very dry summers and cool to cold, slightly wetter winters. The city's extremes of cold and heat are moderated by the influence of Lago Argentino. The waterfront of the city is located on a large shallow bay that is often frozen in the winter, allowing residents to practice ice skating. The highest temperature recorded was 30.7 °C (87.3 °F) on February 6, 1962 while the lowest recorded temperature was −17.4 °C (0.7 °F) on July 27, 2014.

Climate data for El Calafate (Comandante Armando Tola International Airport) 1991–2020, extremes 1951–present (Note: The record highs and lows are based on the Secretaria de Mineria link for the period 1951–1980 while records beyond 1962 come from the Servicio Meteorológico Nacional link. When these two sources are used together, the record highs and lows are from the period 1951–present)
Month	Jan	Feb	Mar	Apr	May	Jun	Jul	Aug	Sep	Oct	Nov	Dec	Year
Record high °C (°F)	30.5 (86.9)	30.7 (87.3)	27.0 (80.6)	24.3 (75.7)	20.8 (69.4)	18.0 (64.4)	17.0 (62.6)	21.0 (69.8)	21.8 (71.2)	23.3 (73.9)	26.2 (79.2)	28.5 (83.3)	30.7 (87.3)
Mean daily maximum °C (°F)	19.1 (66.4)	19.2 (66.6)	16.6 (61.9)	12.9 (55.2)	8.7 (47.7)	5.5 (41.9)	5.2 (41.4)	6.9 (44.4)	11.1 (52.0)	13.5 (56.3)	15.8 (60.4)	17.9 (64.2)	12.7 (54.9)
Daily mean °C (°F)	13.9 (57.0)	13.6 (56.5)	10.9 (51.6)	7.1 (44.8)	3.4 (38.1)	1.0 (33.8)	0.6 (33.1)	2.0 (35.6)	5.2 (41.4)	8.0 (46.4)	10.7 (51.3)	12.8 (55.0)	7.4 (45.3)
Mean daily minimum °C (°F)	7.2 (45.0)	6.8 (44.2)	4.7 (40.5)	1.1 (34.0)	−1.7 (28.9)	−3.7 (25.3)	−4.4 (24.1)	−2.8 (27.0)	−0.8 (30.6)	1.3 (34.3)	4.0 (39.2)	6.2 (43.2)	1.5 (34.7)
Record low °C (°F)	−2.2 (28.0)	−2.2 (28.0)	−6.8 (19.8)	−9.6 (14.7)	−12.4 (9.7)	−16.6 (2.1)	−17.4 (0.7)	−15.2 (4.6)	−9.0 (15.8)	−9.0 (15.8)	−5.6 (21.9)	−5.0 (23.0)	−17.4 (0.7)
Average precipitation mm (inches)	6.9 (0.27)	13.7 (0.54)	16.7 (0.66)	19.5 (0.77)	20.3 (0.80)	14.6 (0.57)	13.6 (0.54)	14.2 (0.56)	11.4 (0.45)	13.5 (0.53)	6.9 (0.27)	9.5 (0.37)	160.8 (6.33)
Average precipitation days (≥ 0.1 mm)	2.1	3.1	4.0	4.3	4.9	4.9	4.2	4.7	3.3	3.0	2.0	2.7	42.9
Average snowy days	0.0	0.0	0.0	0.4	1.8	5.6	5.9	4.4	1.3	0.9	0.2	0.1	20.4
Average relative humidity (%)	46.6	51.3	58.3	66.1	75.1	78.4	78.3	75.3	64.0	54.9	49.9	48.1	62.2
Mean monthly sunshine hours	288.3	243.0	213.9	171.0	117.8	93.0	108.5	148.8	192.0	238.7	276.0	272.8	2,363.8
Mean daily sunshine hours	9.3	8.6	6.9	5.7	3.8	3.1	3.5	4.8	6.4	7.7	9.2	8.8	6.5
Percentage possible sunshine	51	52	50	49	41	38	36	44	48	51	54	50	47
Source 1: Servicio Meteorológico Nacional (extremes 1962–present)
Source 2: NOAA (percent sun 1961–1990), Secretaria de Mineria (extremes 1951–1980)

== Attractions ==
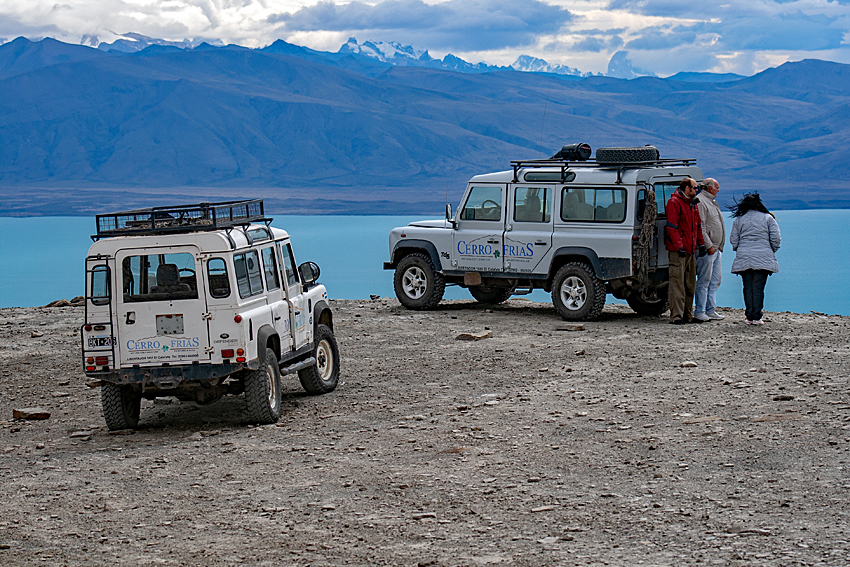
Cerro Frias 4x4 tours

El Calafate is the nearest city to the Perito Moreno Glacier, located 80 km away at Los Glaciares National Park. It's the most important tourist attraction thanks to its location and variety of activities available, such as sightseeing, walking (there are also wheelchair ramps), walking on top of the glacier, sailing, and kayaking.

Other attractions in El Calafate are Laguna Nimez nature preserve, where it's possible to do birdwatching and observe local fauna and flora; 4x4 vehicle excursions to Cerro Frías, Cerro Huyliche and La Leona petrified forest and Punta Walichu (archaeological sites); several farms which showcase traditional activities (sheep herding, shearing, horseback riding, Argentine barbecue, among others); Glaciarium, a museum that focuses on ice and glaciers, especially in the Southern Patagonian Ice Field.

For a variety of trekking tours, tourists often travel to the nearby town of El Chaltén, considered the National Trekking Capital.

== Interesting facts ==
The most recent World Altitude Gliding record of 22,657 m (74,333 ft) was set near El Calafate on 2 September 2018 by Jim Payne and Tim Gardner in the new Perlan 2 glider (with pressurised cabin).

A previous gliding altitude record of 15,460 m (50,722 feet) was set near El Calafate on 29 August 2006 by Steve Fossett and Einar Enevoldson in their 'Perlan' high altitude research glider. This record has been certified by the Fédération Aéronautique Internationale.

The town was on the path of the total solar eclipse of July 11, 2010, occurring just before sunset. El Calafate was featured in the Top Gear Patagonia Special, in which the presenters drove from Bariloche to Ushuaia.
