= Curuzú Cuatiá Airport =

Airport in Argentina

- IATA: UZU; ICAO: SATU

Summary
- Airport type: Public
- Serves: Curuzú Cuatiá
- Elevation AMSL: 229 ft / 70 m
- Coordinates: 29°46′14″S 57°58′44″W

Map
- Location in Argentina

Runways
Direction	Length		Surface
Direction	ft	m	Surface
01/19	6,960	2,121	Asphalt
- Sources: World Aero Data

Curuzú Cuatiá Airport (IATA: UZU, ICAO: SATU) is an airport serving Curuzú Cuatiá, Corrientes, Argentina.

== See also ==
- List of airports in Argentina
