= Presidencia Roque Sáenz Peña =

- City
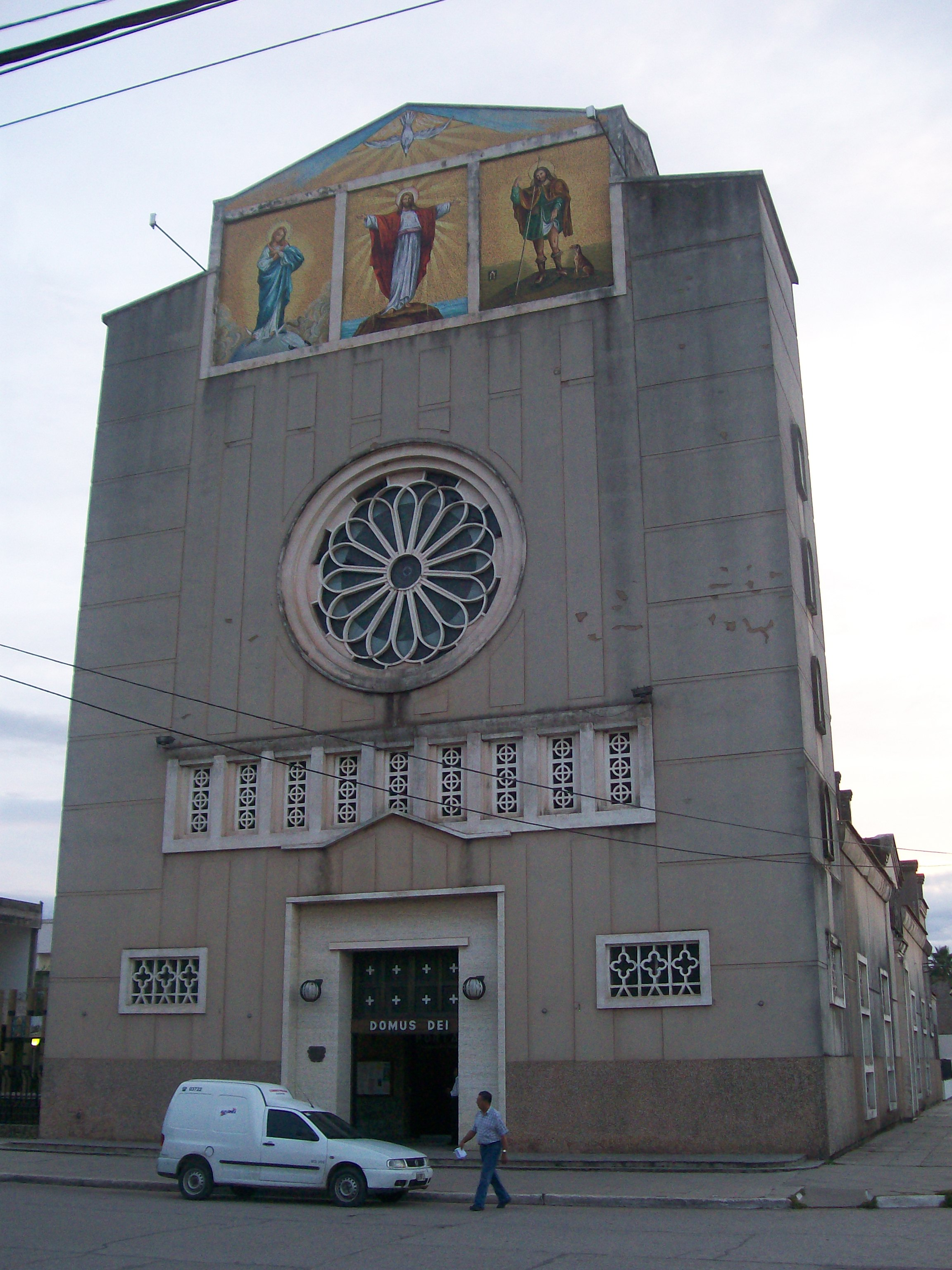

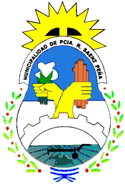
- Coat of arms

- Location of Presidencia Roque Sáenz Peña in Argentina
- Coordinates: 26°47′S 60°27′W
- Country: Argentina
- Province: Chaco
- Department: Comandante Fernández

Government
  - Intendant: Bruno Cipolini (UCR)

Population (2010 census)
  - Total: 89,882
- Time zone: UTC-3 (ART)
- CPA base: H3700
- Dialing code: +54 3732
- Climate: Cfa

Presidencia Roque Sáenz Peña (normally known as Sáenz Peña) is a city in the province of Chaco, Argentina. It is the second largest in the province. It is located 170 kilometres (110 mi) west-northwest of the provincial capital Resistencia, on the main rail and road route across northern Argentina to Salta. The city has a population of 76,377 for the urban area (localidad) and 88,164 for the whole municipality (2001 census [INDEC]).

Sáenz Peña was founded in 1912 and has developed as a commercial and industrial centre serving the surrounding agricultural region of the Gran Chaco plains.

== Climate ==
Climate data for Presidencia Roque Sáenz Peña, Chaco
Month	Jan	Feb	Mar	Apr	May	Jun	Jul	Aug	Sep	Oct	Nov	Dec	Year
Record high °C (°F)	44.5 (112.1)	42.9 (109.2)	41.9 (107.4)	38.8 (101.8)	39.0 (102.2)	35.2 (95.4)	36.7 (98.1)	40.4 (104.7)	43.0 (109.4)	46.2 (115.2)	44.5 (112.1)	44.2 (111.6)	46.2 (115.2)
Mean daily maximum °C (°F)	34.0 (93.2)	32.4 (90.3)	31.1 (88.0)	27.2 (81.0)	24.4 (75.9)	21.9 (71.4)	22.5 (72.5)	24.8 (76.6)	26.8 (80.2)	29.4 (84.9)	31.1 (88.0)	33.0 (91.4)	28.2 (82.8)
Daily mean °C (°F)	27.1 (80.8)	26.1 (79.0)	24.6 (76.3)	20.8 (69.4)	17.9 (64.2)	15.6 (60.1)	15.3 (59.5)	17.0 (62.6)	19.2 (66.6)	22.3 (72.1)	24.2 (75.6)	26.2 (79.2)	21.4 (70.5)
Mean daily minimum °C (°F)	20.2 (68.4)	19.4 (66.9)	18.4 (65.1)	14.9 (58.8)	12.2 (54.0)	10.0 (50.0)	8.8 (47.8)	9.8 (49.6)	11.8 (53.2)	15.1 (59.2)	17.0 (62.6)	19.2 (66.6)	14.7 (58.5)
Record low °C (°F)	8.4 (47.1)	6.8 (44.2)	3.9 (39.0)	0.7 (33.3)	−5.5 (22.1)	−7.3 (18.9)	−7.4 (18.7)	−8.7 (16.3)	−6.5 (20.3)	0.2 (32.4)	2.6 (36.7)	5.0 (41.0)	−8.7 (16.3)
Average precipitation mm (inches)	136.7 (5.38)	120.0 (4.72)	130.7 (5.15)	113.6 (4.47)	47.4 (1.87)	25.4 (1.00)	18.6 (0.73)	21.7 (0.85)	37.4 (1.47)	90.9 (3.58)	118.9 (4.68)	125.3 (4.93)	986.6 (38.84)
Average precipitation days	7	7	7	7	6	5	3	3	4	7	7	7	70
Average relative humidity (%)	70	72	76	78	78	78	73	67	64	67	69	69	72
Mean monthly sunshine hours	285.2	243.0	229.4	189.0	189.1	150.0	186.0	204.6	207.0	241.8	264.0	285.2	2,674.3
Percentage possible sunshine	67	66	60	55	56	46	57	58	58	61	65	67	60
Source: Instituto Nacional de Tecnología Agropecuaria (temperature 1930–2013, precipitation 1924–2013, humidity 1965–2013 and sun 1968–2013)

== Transport ==
The city is served by Primer Teniente Jorge Eduardo Casco Airport.

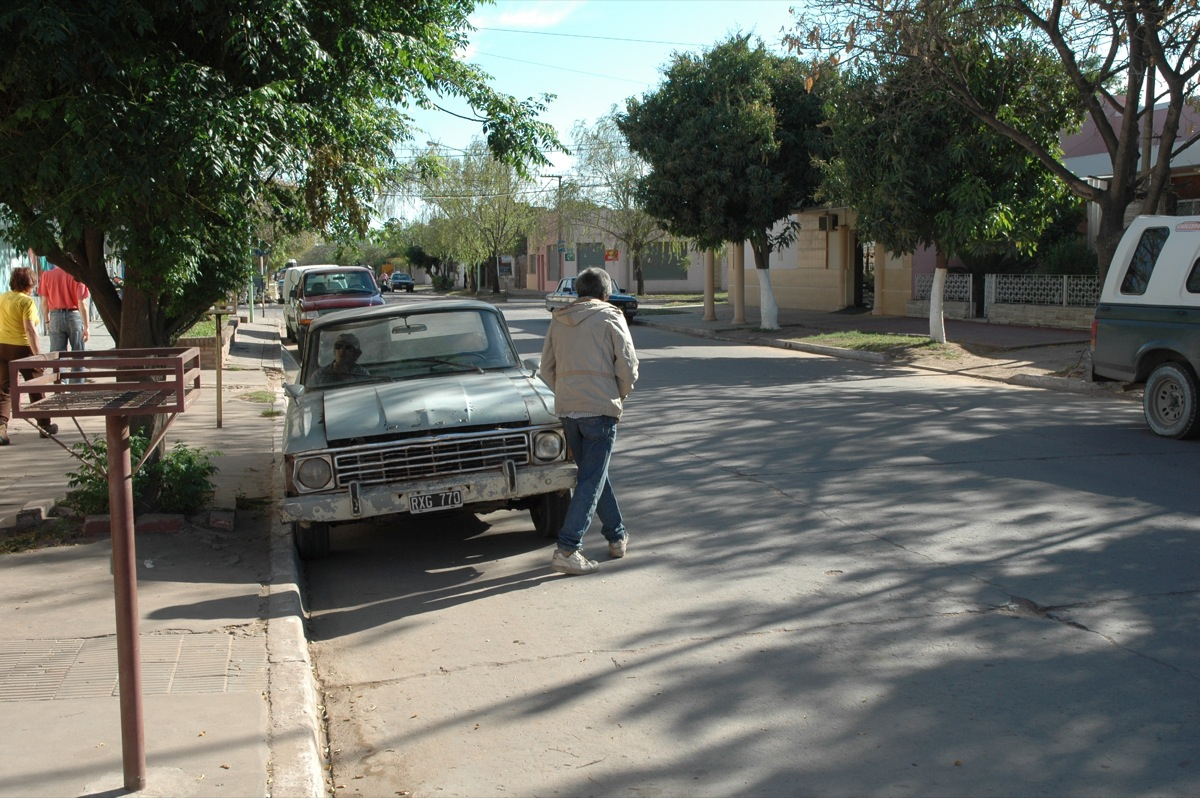
Residential section

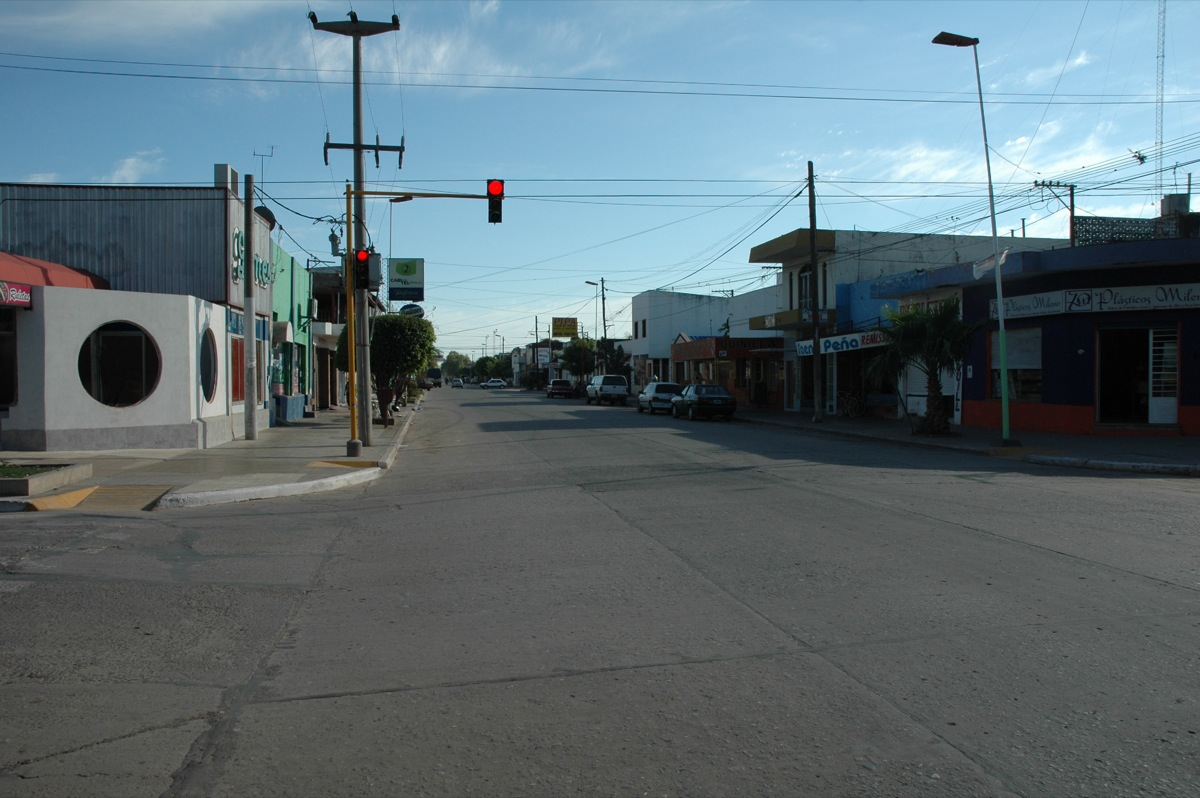
Commercial district

== See also ==
- National University of the Chaco Austral
