= Lake Argentino =

Glacial lake in the Patagonian province of Santa Cruz, Argentina

Argentino Lake
- Lago Argentino
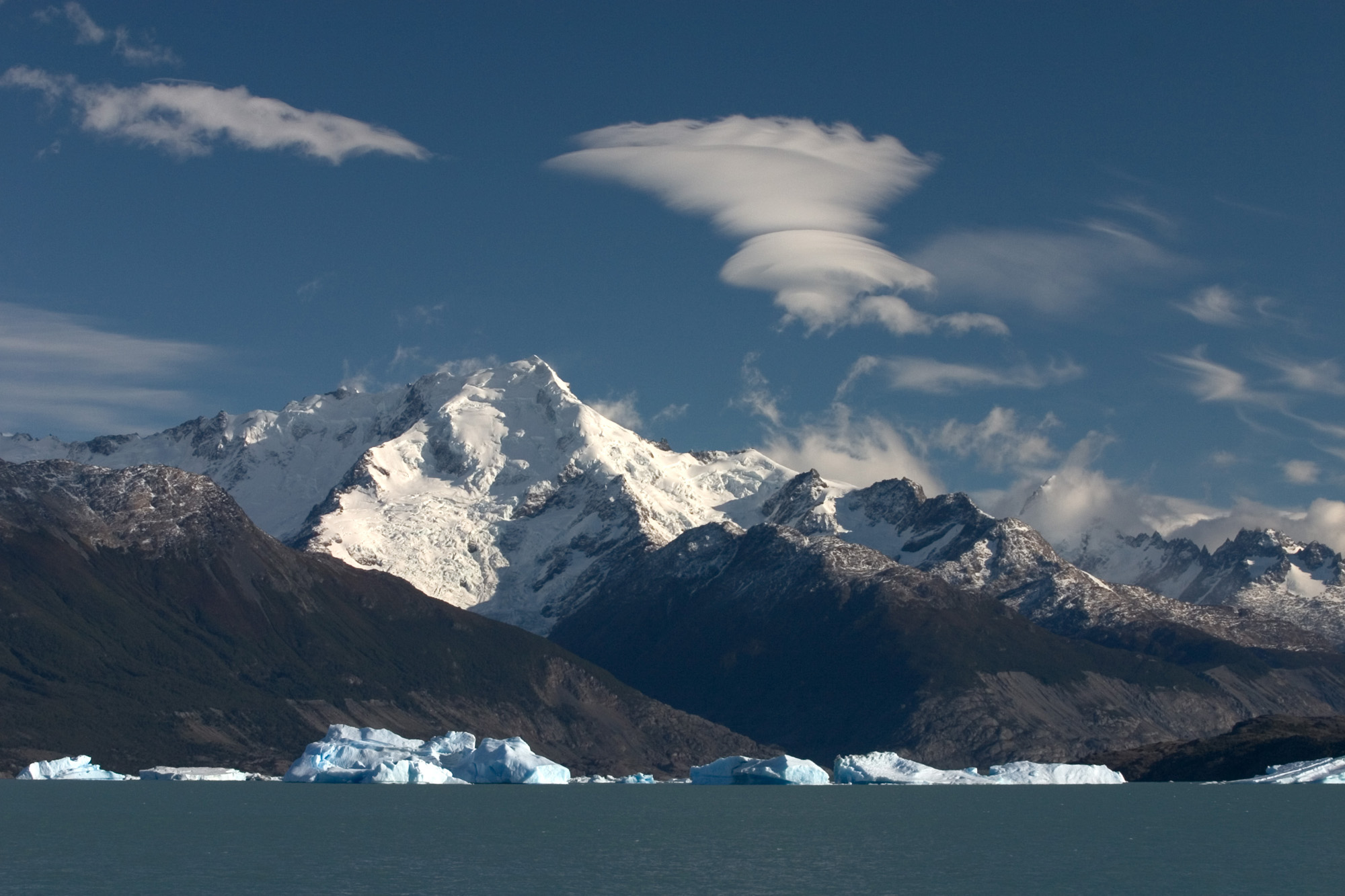
- Northern arm of the lake

- Location within Argentina
- Interactive map of Argentino Lake
- Location: Lago Argentino Department, Santa Cruz Province, Argentina
- Coordinates: 50°13′S 72°25′W
- Lake type: glacier lake
- Primary inflows: La Leona River and the glaciers in the western part
- Primary outflows: Santa Cruz River
- Catchment area: 17,000 km^{2} (6,600 sq mi)
- Basin countries: Argentina, Chile
- Max. length: 120 km (75 mi)
- Max. width: 32 km (20 mi)
- Surface area: 1,415 km^{2} (546 sq mi)
- Average depth: 155.4 m (510 ft)
- Max. depth: 719 m (2,359 ft)
- Water volume: 219.9 km^{3} (52.8 cu mi)
- Shore length^{1}: 687 km (427 mi)
- Surface elevation: 178 m (584 ft)
- Settlements: El Calafate
- ^{1} Shore length is not a well-defined measure.

Lago Argentino is a lake in the Patagonian province of Santa Cruz, Argentina. It is the largest freshwater lake in Argentina, with a surface area of 1,415 km^{2} (546 mi^{2}) and a maximum width of 20 mi (32 km). The lake's waters have an average depth of 155 m (509 ft), with a maximum depth of 719 m (2,359 ft). The deepest point of the lake is situated in the end of its narrow north-northwestern arm, in front of the retreating Upsala Glacier. This depth was discovered during a survey in 2001. The south-southwestern arm ends in front of the Perito Moreno Glacier. The glaciers debouch into the lake at these sites, making "trenches" in the bedrock. The lake reaches 541 m (1,775 ft) below mean sea level.

Lago Argentino lies within Los Glaciares National Park in a landscape accented by numerous glaciers, and the lakes of the area are fed by the glacial meltwater of several rivers. For example, the waters of Lake Viedma are fed by the La Leona River, and many other smaller mountain streams. Lago Argentino's drainage basin amounts to more than 17,000 km^{2} (6,564 mi^{2}). Water from Lake Argentino flows into the Atlantic Ocean through the Santa Cruz River.

The glaciers, the nearby town of El Calafate, and the lake itself are all important tourist destinations with many hostels, hotels and other amenities catering to the outdoors located in the region. The lake in particular is appreciated for fishing. Perch, common galaxias ("puyen grande"), lake trout and rainbow trout—in both anadromous and potamodromous forms—are all found.

Lago Argentino was also the name of the airport that served the area until 2000. This airport was closed and its runway incorporated into the city's road system. It has been replaced by Comandante Armando Tola International Airport, which serves the town of El Calafate and Lago Argentino with many national and international flights each day.

== Flora and fauna ==
Lago Argentino and its surrounding terrain is home to numerous living organisms; as of 2024, the biodiversity database iNaturalist lists nearly 500 recorded plant and almost 400 animal species as being found in the area, as well as nearly 100 types of fungi and lichen.

Birds

Around 150 species of birds have been documented in and around the lake. Many are endemic to the region, such as the roughly 50-60 species of wading birds and waterfowl; iconic amphibious species, like Andean and Chilean flamingos, as well as the black-headed duck, black-necked swan, cinnamon teal, crested duck, Coscoroba swan, kelp goose, silver teal, torrent duck and many others can be found here, as well as varied species of coot, cormorant, dotterel, gallinule, godwit, grebe, gull, knot, lapwing, oystercatcher, phalarope, plover, sandpiper, snipe, stilt, tern and yellowlegs.

Other birds include the famous Andean condor (the largest New World vulture), Austral parakeet, Austral pygmy-owl, cinereous harrier, crested caracara, the flightless Darwin's rhea (the largest bird in the area), lesser horned owl, Magellanic woodpecker, and the short-eared owl.

Fish

Puyen (Galaxias maculatus) and perca (Percichthys), are two registered species of fish that live in the lake. Also present are introduced and non-native brown trout (Salmo trutta), chinook salmon (Oncorhynchus tshawytscha), lake trout (Salvelinus namaycush) and rainbow trout (O. mykiss).

Reptiles and Amphibians

Of the roughly 10-15 reptile species recorded in the vicinity of Lago Argentino, the majority of them are lizards (Squamata) of the genera Diplolaemus and Liolaemus, including several species of tree "iguanas", smooth-headed and smooth-throated lizards.

Anurans (frogs and toads) that inhabit the lake include Alsodes coppingeri, the Eden Harbour toad (Nannophryne variegata), the large four-eyed frog (Pleurodema bufoninum), Nibaldo's wood frog (Batrachyla nibaldoi), and the Puerto Eden frog (Chaltenobatrachus grandisonae).

== Climate ==
Argentino Lake has a cold desert climate (Köppen BWk).

Climate data for Lago Argentino Airport
Month	Jan	Feb	Mar	Apr	May	Jun	Jul	Aug	Sep	Oct	Nov	Dec	Year
Record high °C (°F)	30.5 (86.9)	30.7 (87.3)	27.0 (80.6)	22.3 (72.1)	19.9 (67.8)	17.5 (63.5)	16.5 (61.7)	18.7 (65.7)	21.8 (71.2)	23.3 (73.9)	25.0 (77.0)	28.5 (83.3)	30.5 (86.9)
Mean daily maximum °C (°F)	19.2 (66.6)	18.7 (65.7)	16.2 (61.2)	12.4 (54.3)	7.6 (45.7)	4.8 (40.6)	4.7 (40.5)	6.9 (44.4)	10.5 (50.9)	14.2 (57.6)	16.7 (62.1)	18.5 (65.3)	12.5 (54.5)
Daily mean °C (°F)	13.4 (56.1)	13.1 (55.6)	10.7 (51.3)	7.6 (45.7)	3.9 (39.0)	1.5 (34.7)	1.2 (34.2)	2.6 (36.7)	5.3 (41.5)	8.5 (47.3)	11.2 (52.2)	12.8 (55.0)	7.7 (45.9)
Mean daily minimum °C (°F)	7.8 (46.0)	7.5 (45.5)	5.2 (41.4)	2.8 (37.0)	−0.3 (31.5)	−2.4 (27.7)	−2.8 (27.0)	−1.5 (29.3)	0.1 (32.2)	2.7 (36.9)	5.0 (41.0)	6.6 (43.9)	2.6 (36.7)
Record low °C (°F)	−0.2 (31.6)	0.4 (32.7)	−4.0 (24.8)	−4.0 (24.8)	−8.5 (16.7)	−11.5 (11.3)	−11.8 (10.8)	−12.0 (10.4)	−7.0 (19.4)	−4.4 (24.1)	−2.5 (27.5)	−2.6 (27.3)	−12.0 (10.4)
Average precipitation mm (inches)	5.9 (0.23)	4.3 (0.17)	7.5 (0.30)	14.0 (0.55)	19.2 (0.76)	18.1 (0.71)	16.3 (0.64)	16.1 (0.63)	6.3 (0.25)	8.7 (0.34)	3.0 (0.12)	3.9 (0.15)	123.3 (4.85)
Average precipitation days	3	3	4	6	7	6	7	5	3	4	3	2	53
Average relative humidity (%)	48	48	51	59	69	73	73	68	58	51	46	46	58
Mean monthly sunshine hours	260.4	209.1	195.3	156.0	117.8	99.0	96.1	142.6	168.0	223.2	249.0	269.7	2,186.2
Percentage possible sunshine	52.5	51.5	50.5	48.5	42.0	39.5	35.0	43.5	48.0	52.0	54.0	53.0	47.5
Source 1: Servicio Meteorologico Nacional
Source 2: Secretaria de Mineria(sun, record high and some record lows 1951–1980), NOAA(some record lows 1971–1990)

== Gallery ==
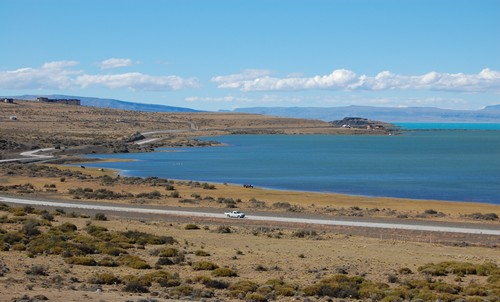
Argentino seen from the town of El Calafate

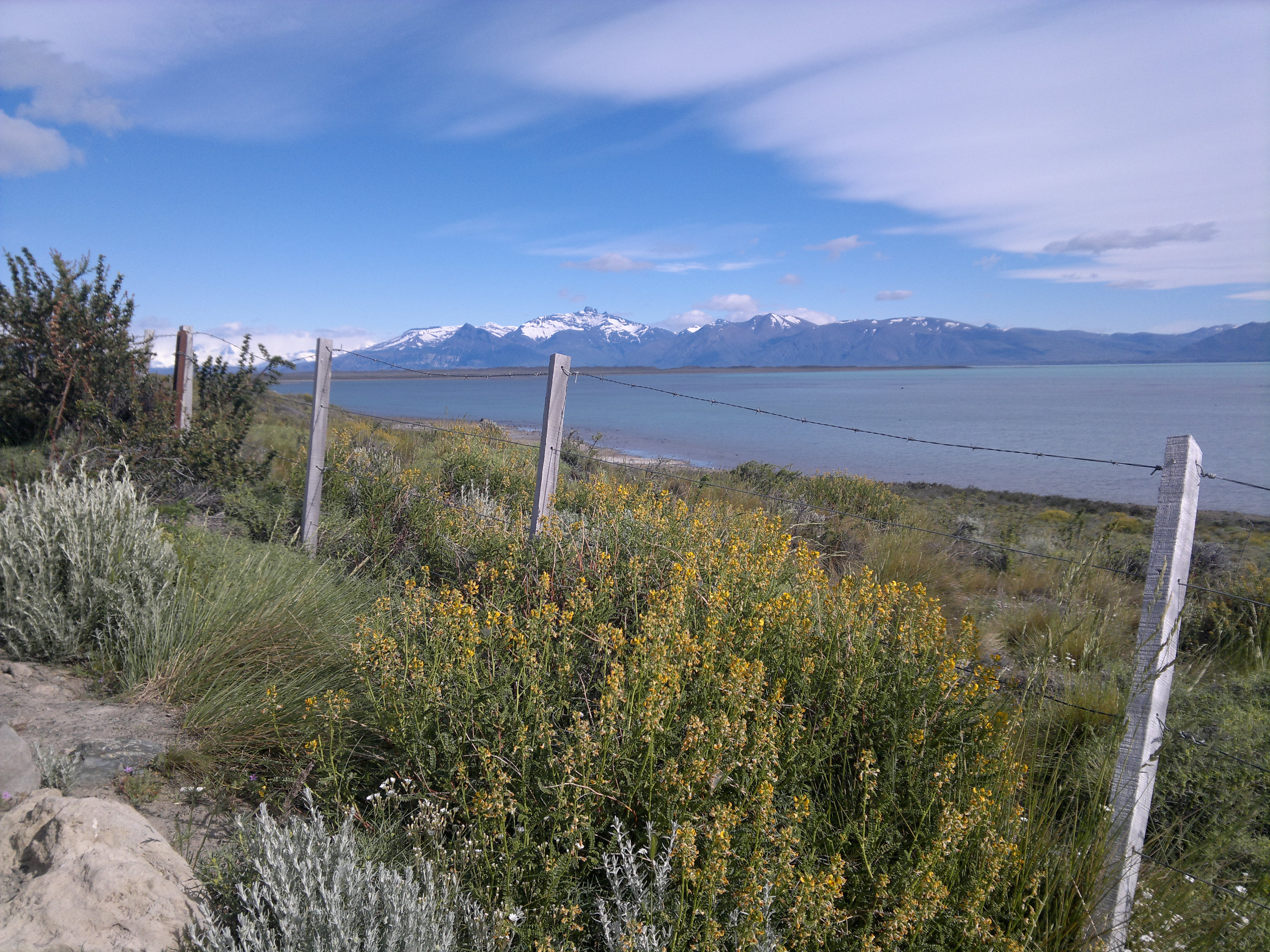
Lake Argentino as seen from the road to Los Glaciares National Park

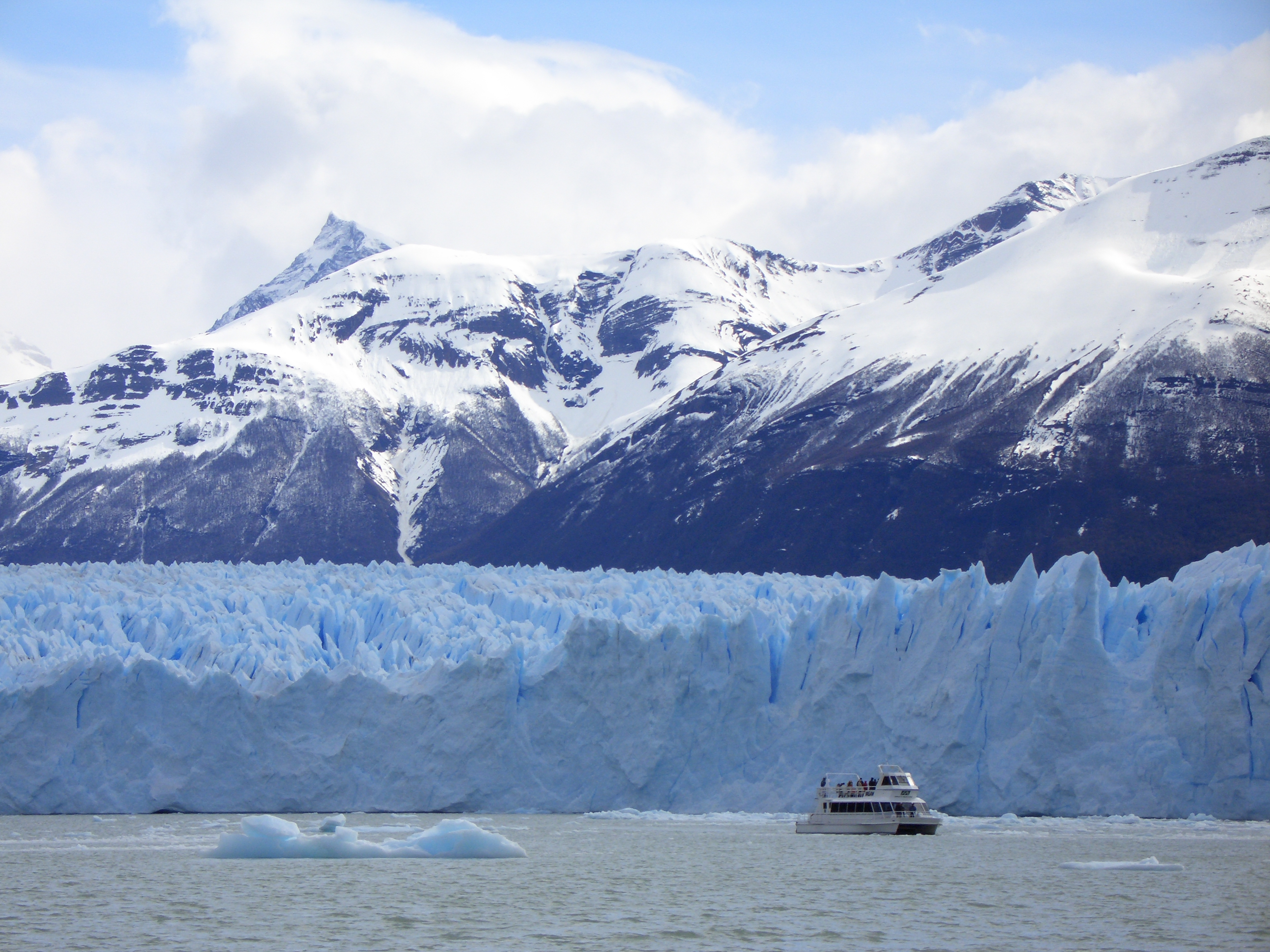
Base of Perito Moreno glacier

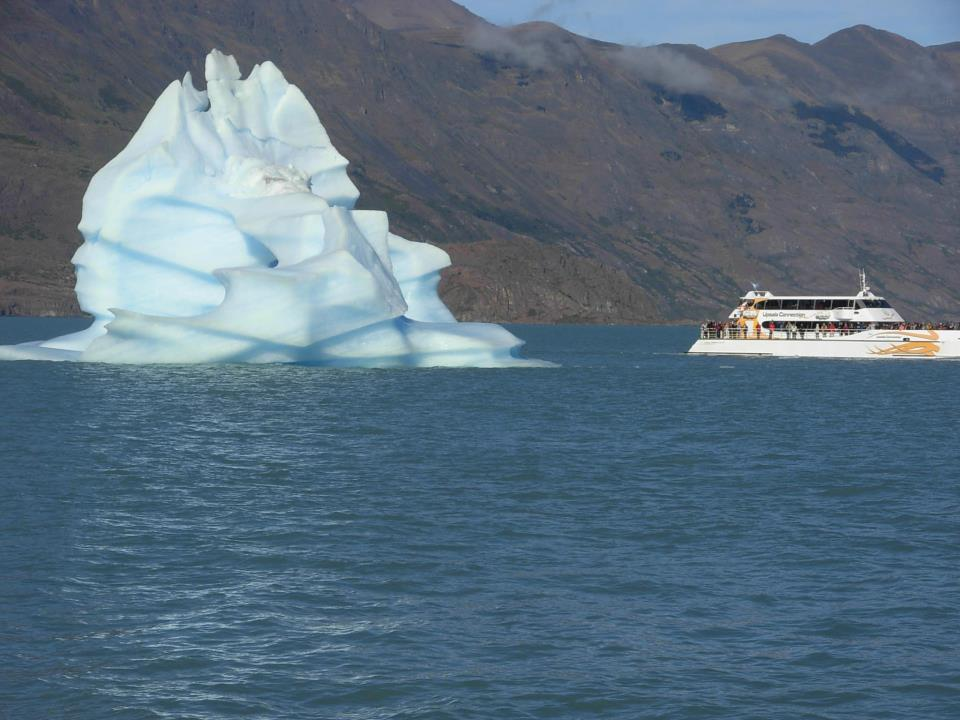
Iceberg and tourist boat on the lake

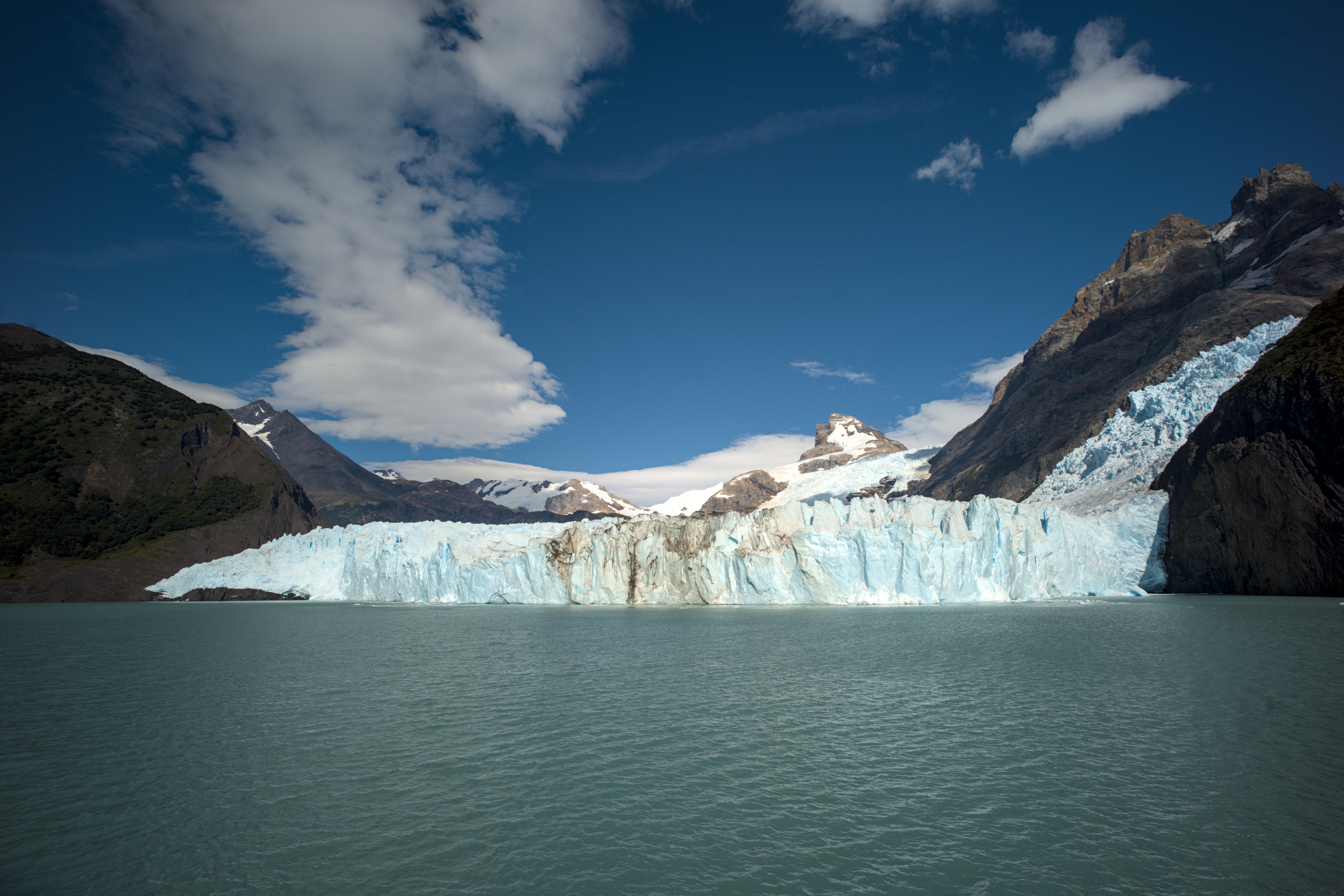
The Spegazzini glacier on the Lago Argentino

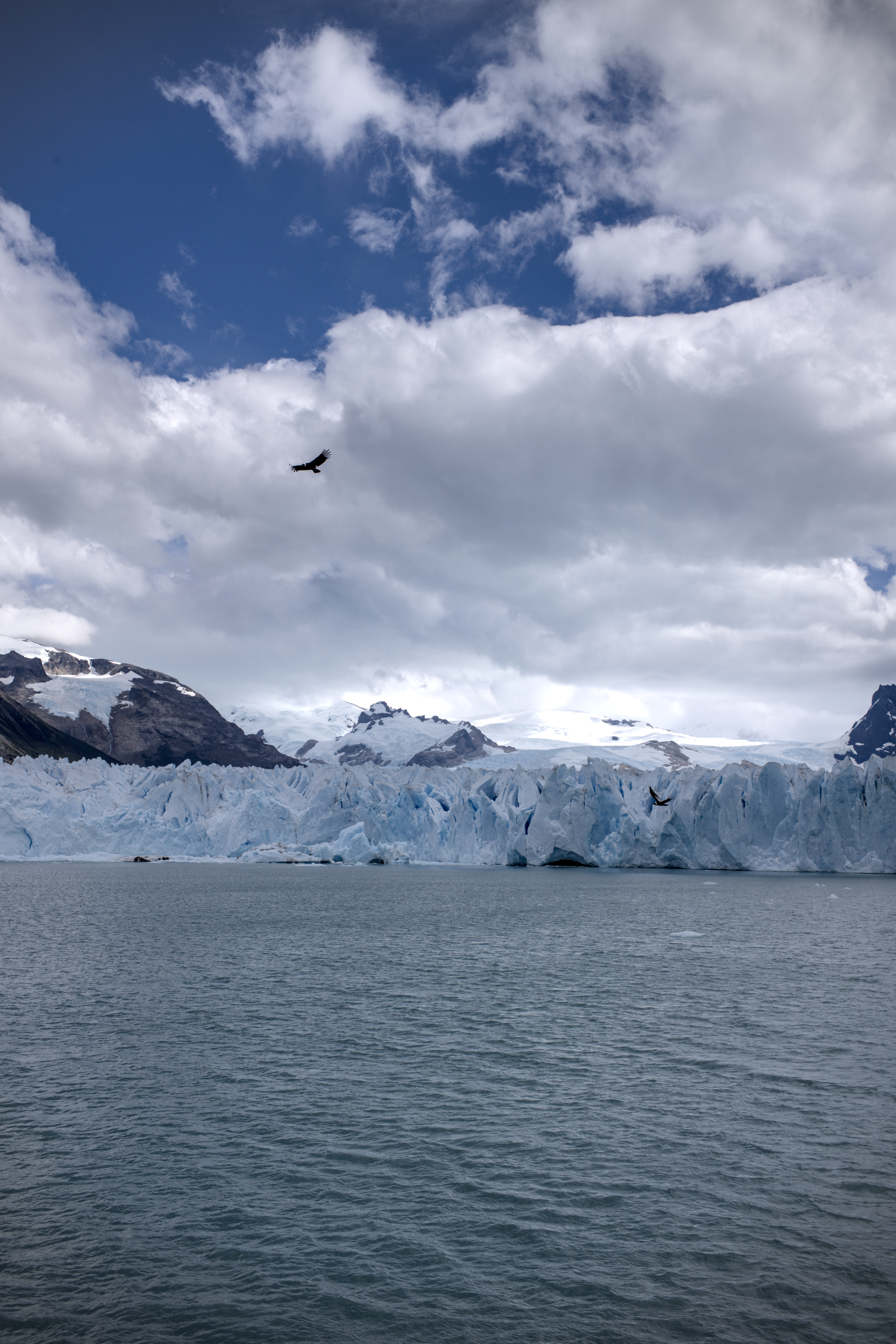
Two condors flying in front of the Perito Moreno glacier at the Argentino Lake

== See also ==
- Lake Viedma
- Lake San Martín
- Puerto Bandera
