= Primer Teniente Jorge Eduardo Casco Airport =

Airport in Argentina

Presidencia Roque Sáenz Peña Airport Termal Airport
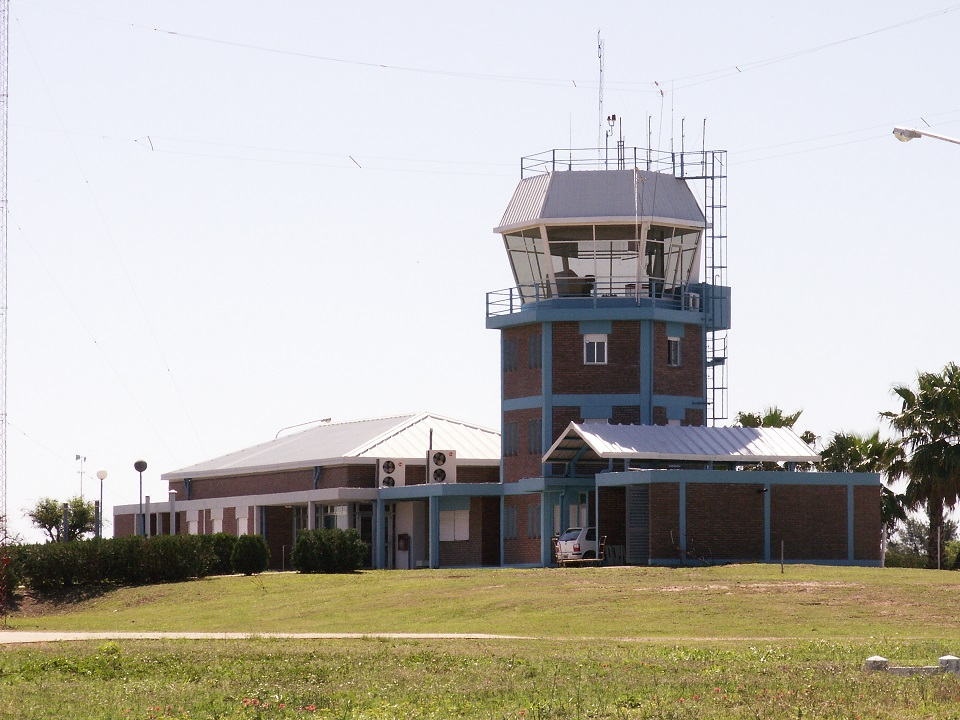
- IATA: PRQ; ICAO: SARS

Summary
- Airport type: Public
- Serves: Presidencia Roque Sáenz Peña, Argentina
- Elevation AMSL: 302 ft / 92 m
- Coordinates: 26°45′20″S 60°29′35″W

Map
- Location of airport in Argentina

Runways
Direction	Length		Surface
Direction	m	ft	Surface
03/21	1,800	5,906	Concrete
- Source: Landings.com Google Maps SkyVector

Presidencia Roque Sáenz Peña Airport (Spanish: Aeropuerto Presidencia Roque Sáenz Peña, IATA: PRQ, ICAO: SARS) is a public use airport located 5 kilometres (3 mi) northwest of Presidencia Roque Sáenz Peña, a city in the Chaco Province of Argentina.

The non-directional beacon (Ident: PSP) is located on the field.

== See also ==
- Transport in Argentina
- List of airports in Argentina
