= Curuzú Cuatiá =

Curuzú Cuatiá Kurusu Kuatia (Guarani)
- City
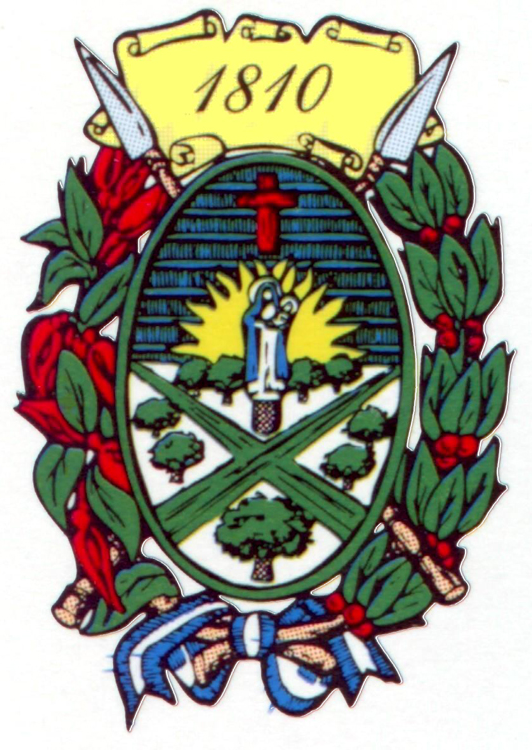
- Flag Coat of arms

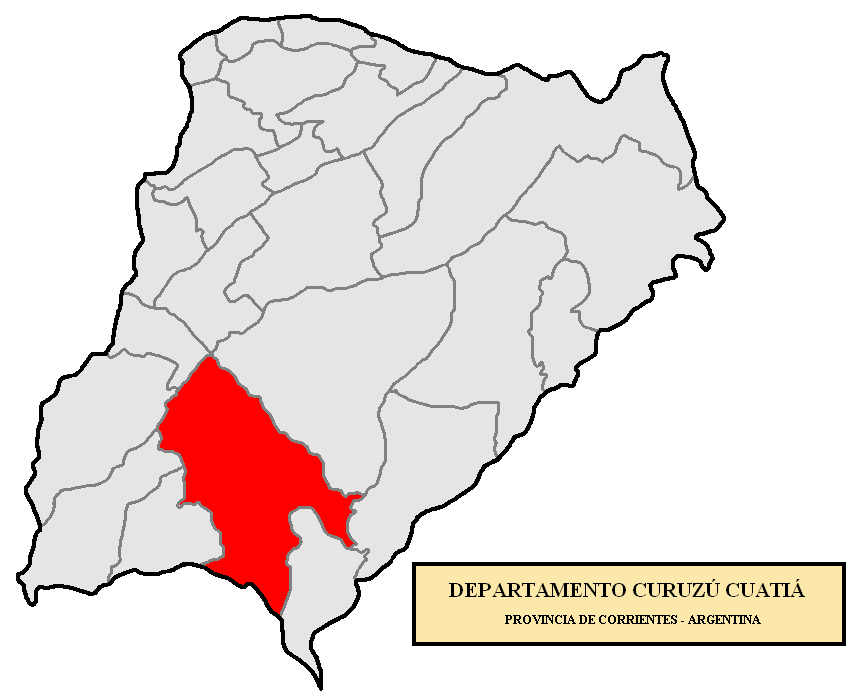

- Location of Curuzú Cuatiá in Argentina
- Coordinates: 29°47′S 58°5′W
- Country: Argentina
- Province: Corrientes
- Department: Curuzú Cuatiá
- Founded: November 16, 1810

Government
  - Intendant: Verónica Inés Espíndola (UCR)
- Elevation: 61 m (200 ft)

Population (2010 census)
  - Total: 34,470
- Demonym: curuzucuateña/o
- Time zone: UTC−3 (ART)
- CPA base: W3460
- Dialing code: +54 3774
- Website: Official website

Curuzú Cuatiá (Guarani: Kurusu Kuatia) is a city in the south of the province of Corrientes in the Argentine Mesopotamia. It had about 34,000 inhabitants at the 2010 census [INDEC], and is the head town of the Curuzú Cuatiá Department.

The area has an undulated terrain, with many small rivers and streams that empty into the Paraná River in the west, or into the Uruguay River in the east. The climate is wet subtropical, with uniformly distributed annual rainfall of 1,200 mm on average. The average temperatures are 14.5 °C (winter) and 26 °C (summer), with recorded extremes of −3 °C and 44 °C respectively.

The city is served by an airport (IATA: UZU, ICAO: SATU), located at 29°47′S 58°1′W.

== History ==
The name Curuzú Cuatiá is of Guaraní origin and means "Engraved Cross". The early settlers (Spanish conquistadores and Jesuit missionaries from Uruguay) called it Posta de Cruz since the site was a crossroads, marked by a large cross with an inscription.

After the May Revolution that initiated the struggle for independence of Argentina from Spain, the army led by General Manuel Belgrano passed by. Belgrano solved a government conflict in the area by assigning the jurisdiction to the Cabildo of Corrientes. On 16 November 1810 he dictated the official foundation of the city, which (respecting the wishes and beliefs of the population) he named Nuestra Señora de Pilar de Curuzú Cuatiá ("Our Lady of Pilar of Curuzú Cuatiá").

The area saw several important battles during the centralist-federalist struggle, the most remarkable being the Battle of Pago Largo (31 March 1839) against Entre Ríos supporters of Juan Manuel de Rosas.

The town was officially assigned the category of village (villa) on 9 October 1852, and became a city on 25 October 1888.

== Climate ==
Climate data for Curuzú Cuatiá (1981–1990)
Month	Jan	Feb	Mar	Apr	May	Jun	Jul	Aug	Sep	Oct	Nov	Dec	Year
Mean daily maximum °C (°F)	33.0 (91.4)	30.7 (87.3)	29.0 (84.2)	25.1 (77.2)	21.8 (71.2)	18.4 (65.1)	18.7 (65.7)	21.0 (69.8)	21.9 (71.4)	25.9 (78.6)	28.3 (82.9)	31.4 (88.5)	25.4 (77.7)
Daily mean °C (°F)	26.9 (80.4)	25.1 (77.2)	23.3 (73.9)	19.5 (67.1)	16.3 (61.3)	12.9 (55.2)	12.7 (54.9)	15.2 (59.4)	16.2 (61.2)	19.8 (67.6)	22.7 (72.9)	25.3 (77.5)	19.7 (67.5)
Mean daily minimum °C (°F)	19.8 (67.6)	19.4 (66.9)	17.3 (63.1)	14.1 (57.4)	10.5 (50.9)	7.7 (45.9)	7.3 (45.1)	9.1 (48.4)	10.3 (50.5)	12.9 (55.2)	16.1 (61.0)	17.9 (64.2)	13.5 (56.3)
Average precipitation mm (inches)	123.9 (4.88)	153.7 (6.05)	152.3 (6.00)	201.6 (7.94)	99.9 (3.93)	79.4 (3.13)	50.1 (1.97)	50.6 (1.99)	112.2 (4.42)	129.1 (5.08)	132.2 (5.20)	90.1 (3.55)	1,375.1 (54.14)
Average precipitation days	8	9	8	9	6	8	6	6	8	8	7	6	89
Average relative humidity (%)	62	72	73	79	79	82	79	74	75	69	69	61	73
Source: Servicio Meteorologico Nacional
