= Gobernador Gregores Airport =

Airport in Argentina

- IATA: GGS; ICAO: SAWR

Summary
- Airport type: Public
- Location: Gobernador Gregores, Argentina
- Elevation AMSL: 1,168 ft (356 m)
- Coordinates: 48°46′58″S 70°09′00″W

Map
- Location of airport in Argentina

Runways
Direction	Length		Surface
Direction	m	ft	Surface
10/28	2,600	8,530	Asphalt
- Source: SkyVector Google Maps

Gobernador Gregores Airport (IATA: GGS, ICAO: SAWR), is an airport serving Gobernador Gregores, a town in the Santa Cruz Province of Argentina. The airport is 6 kilometres (4 mi) east-southeast of the town, on a low mesa above the Chico River.

An overrun of 300 metres (980 ft) on the west end of the runway will drop off the mesa. There is a higher mesa just off the east end, less than 500 metres (1,600 ft) north of the approach path.

The Gobernador Gregores non-directional beacon (Ident: GRE) is located on the field.

== See also ==
- Transport in Argentina
- List of airports in Argentina
