= Gobernador Gregores =

Town in Argentina

Coordinates: 48°46′0″S 70°15′0″W

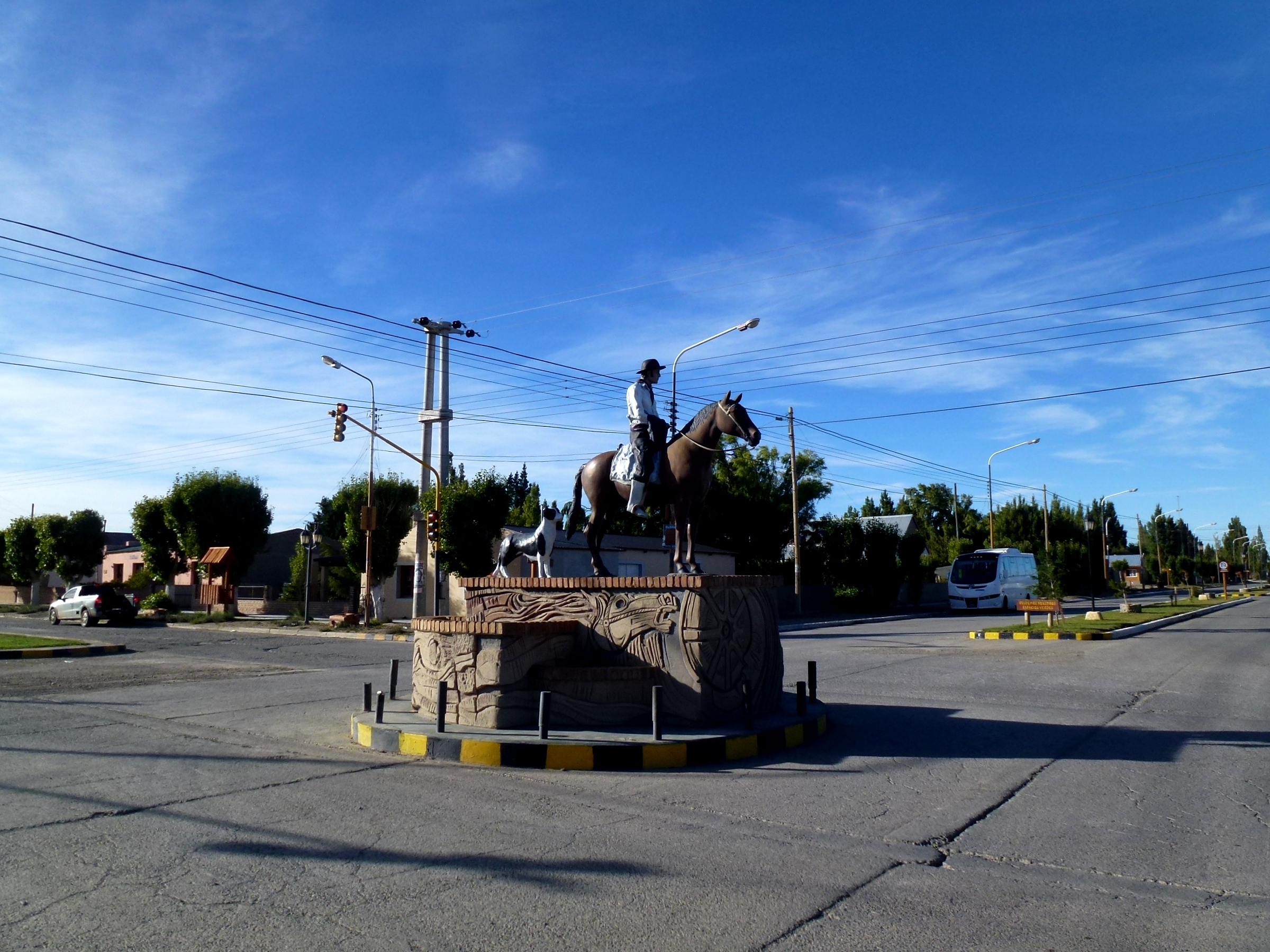
Gobernador Gregores

Gobernador Gregores (Spanish: Governor Gregores) is a town in Santa Cruz Province, Argentina, formerly known as Cañadón León. It had a population of 5,343 at the 2022 Census, comprising 84.6% of the entire population of Río Chico Department, of which it is the capital. Outerello, one of the leaders of the massive strike known as Patagonia rebelde was executed there by a firing squad of the Argentine Army in November 1921.

The town is named for Juan Manuel Gregores, governor of the Territory of Santa Cruz.

== Geography ==
=== Climate ===
Gobernador Gregores has a borderline cool semi-arid climate (Köppen BSk)/cool arid climate (BWk) characterised by mild summers, chilly winters and low precipitation year-round. Despite the dryness, the weather is frequently cloudy due to the incessant Antarctic low pressure systems.

Climate data for Gobernador Gregores (extremes 1951–present) (Note: The record highs and lows are based on the Secretaria de Mineria link for the period 1951–1960 and 1971–1980 while records beyond 1961 come from the Servicio Meteorológico Nacional link since it only covers from 1961–present. As a result, the most extreme values from either source are used.)
Month	Jan	Feb	Mar	Apr	May	Jun	Jul	Aug	Sep	Oct	Nov	Dec	Year
Record high °C (°F)	38.5 (101.3)	38.0 (100.4)	35.0 (95.0)	26.6 (79.9)	20.6 (69.1)	17.7 (63.9)	17.0 (62.6)	21.4 (70.5)	26.2 (79.2)	29.2 (84.6)	31.5 (88.7)	36.5 (97.7)	38.5 (101.3)
Mean daily maximum °C (°F)	21.6 (70.9)	20.9 (69.6)	19.0 (66.2)	14.3 (57.7)	8.9 (48.0)	6.0 (42.8)	5.6 (42.1)	7.3 (45.1)	11.3 (52.3)	16.1 (61.0)	19.3 (66.7)	21.5 (70.7)	14.3 (57.7)
Daily mean °C (°F)	15.4 (59.7)	14.7 (58.5)	12.3 (54.1)	8.3 (46.9)	3.9 (39.0)	0.7 (33.3)	0.9 (33.6)	2.1 (35.8)	5.2 (41.4)	9.3 (48.7)	12.5 (54.5)	14.7 (58.5)	8.3 (46.9)
Mean daily minimum °C (°F)	9.3 (48.7)	8.8 (47.8)	6.4 (43.5)	3.1 (37.6)	−0.2 (31.6)	−4.1 (24.6)	−3.3 (26.1)	−2.3 (27.9)	−0.1 (31.8)	2.7 (36.9)	5.7 (42.3)	7.7 (45.9)	2.8 (37.0)
Record low °C (°F)	0.2 (32.4)	−0.8 (30.6)	−4.0 (24.8)	−9.4 (15.1)	−16.7 (1.9)	−17.5 (0.5)	−21.5 (−6.7)	−22.4 (−8.3)	−13.7 (7.3)	−7.4 (18.7)	−5.8 (21.6)	−3.8 (25.2)	−22.4 (−8.3)
Average precipitation mm (inches)	8.7 (0.34)	14.1 (0.56)	21.0 (0.83)	16.3 (0.64)	14.4 (0.57)	17.8 (0.70)	12.9 (0.51)	12.2 (0.48)	10.4 (0.41)	8.3 (0.33)	10.3 (0.41)	8.5 (0.33)	154.9 (6.10)
Average precipitation days (≥ 0.1 mm)	4	5	4	4	5	7	5	4	5	3	4	5	55
Average relative humidity (%)	45.0	44.0	47.5	52.0	65.0	71.0	71.0	62.0	52.5	47.5	40.5	42.0	53.3
Mean monthly sunshine hours	238.7	209.1	167.4	147.0	127.1	102.0	102.3	139.5	123.0	182.9	222.0	229.4	1,990.4
Percentage possible sunshine	50	51	44	46	45	41	38	44	35	43	49	46	44
Source 1: Secretaria de Mineria (normals and extremes 1951–1960, 1971–1980)
Source 2: Servicio Meteorológico Nacional (precipitation days 1961–1990 and extremes 1961–present)
