= Austral Líneas Aéreas Flight 205 =

1959 aviation accident

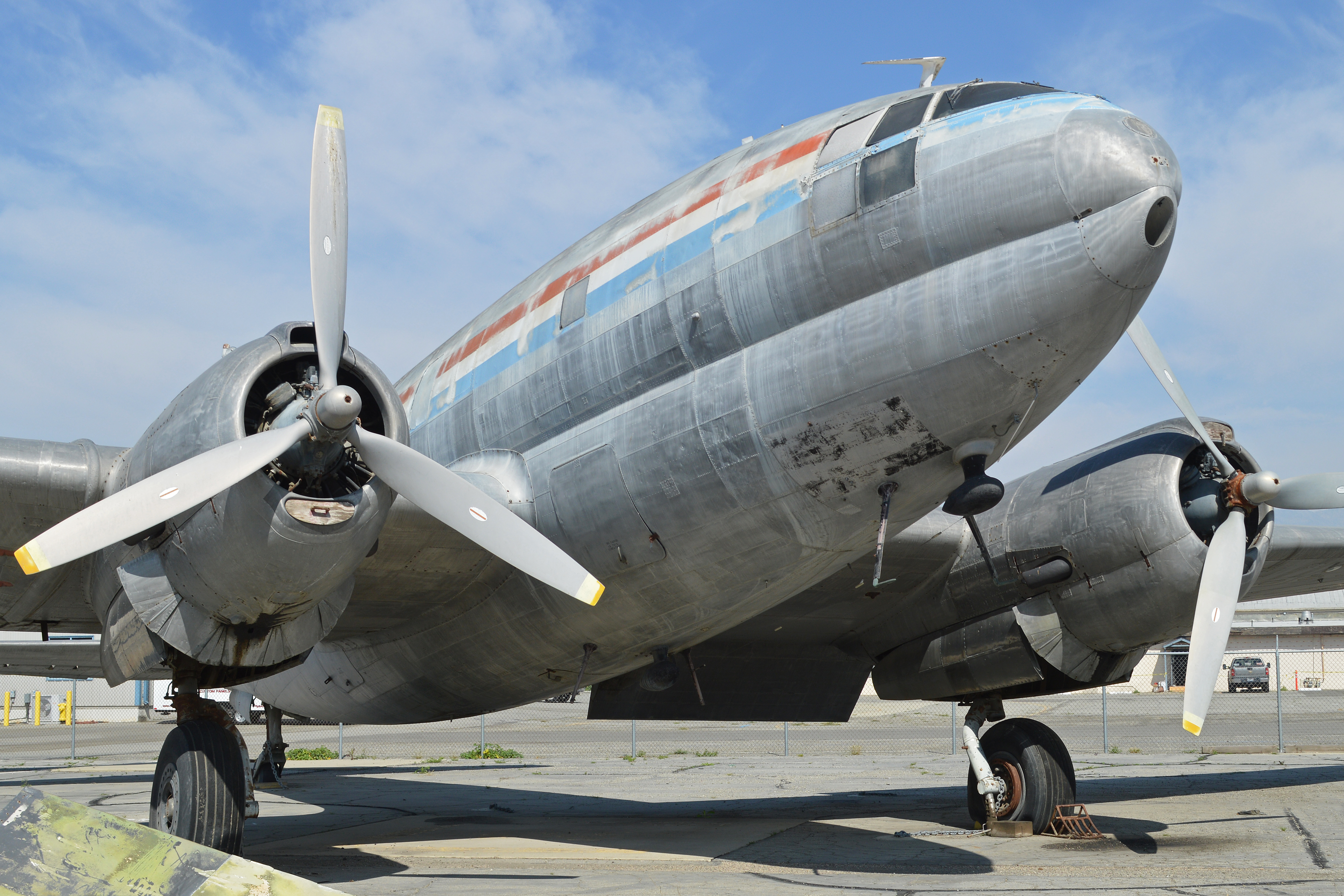
- A Curtiss C-46A Commando, similar to the one involved in the accident.

Accident
- Date: 16 January 1959
- Summary: Crashed while attempting to land in IFR conditions
- Site: Off Mar del Plata, Argentina; 37.93333°S 57.56667°W

Aircraft
- Aircraft type: Curtiss C-46 Commando
- Operator: Austral Líneas Aéreas
- Registration: LV-GED
- Flight origin: Buenos Aires-Jorge Newbery Airport,(AEP/SABE), Argentina
- Destination: Mar Del Plata Airport, (MDQ/SAZM), Argentina
- Occupants: 52
- Passengers: 47
- Crew: 5
- Fatalities: 51
- Injuries: 1
- Survivors: 1

Austral Líneas Aéreas Flight 205 was a regularly scheduled domestic Austral Líneas Aéreas flight operating a route between Buenos Aires and Mar del Plata in Argentina that crashed after encountering poor weather conditions during landing on 16 January 1959, killing 51 of the 52 passengers and crew on board. At the time, the crash was the second-worst accident in Argentine aviation history and is currently the sixth-worst involving a Curtiss C-46 Commando.

== Accident ==
The Curtiss C-46 Commando, registration LV-GED, took off from Buenos Aires at 19:50 local time with five crew members and 47 passengers aboard for an approximately 250-mile flight to Mar del Plata. The aircraft had already been delayed for 35 minutes due to poor weather conditions at its destination.

The flight was uneventful and the airplane was cleared for landing by controllers on runway 12 as it neared Mar Del Plata Airport. At the time the airport's non-directional beacon (NDB) was not functional, contributing to issues with navigation. As the aircraft passed over the runway at an altitude of 85 metres (279 ft), it overshot the runway. Missing the approach, the captain decided to commence a go-around.

However, in bad visibility with poor airport lighting, the C-46 stalled and crashed into the sea about 1.2 kilometres (0.75 mi) away from the airport at 21:40 local time. All members of the crew and 46 of the 47 passengers were killed.

The sole survivor, businessman Roberto Servente, endured four hours in the sea and managed to swim to shore with multiple fractures and serious injuries. He would later work with the airline itself and become the director of Austral. Roberto Servente died on 7 March 2014, 54 years after the accident, aged 93.

== Causes ==
An investigation of the crash placed most of the blame for the accident on the crew. The pilot was not familiar with the airspace and had miscalculated his instrument approach, resulting in a missed approach. In addition, the crew's mental state contributed to the subsequent stall and loss of control that caused the aircraft to crash. Contributing factors were the non-functioning radio beacon and the poor visibility which made discerning the airport's lights and runway difficult.

== See also ==
- Austral Líneas Aéreas Flight 046
- Austral Líneas Aéreas Flight 2553
- Austral Líneas Aéreas Flight 901
- 1947 BSAA Avro Lancastrian Star Dust accident
