= Philippine Air Lines Flight 158 =

1969 aviation accident in the Philippines

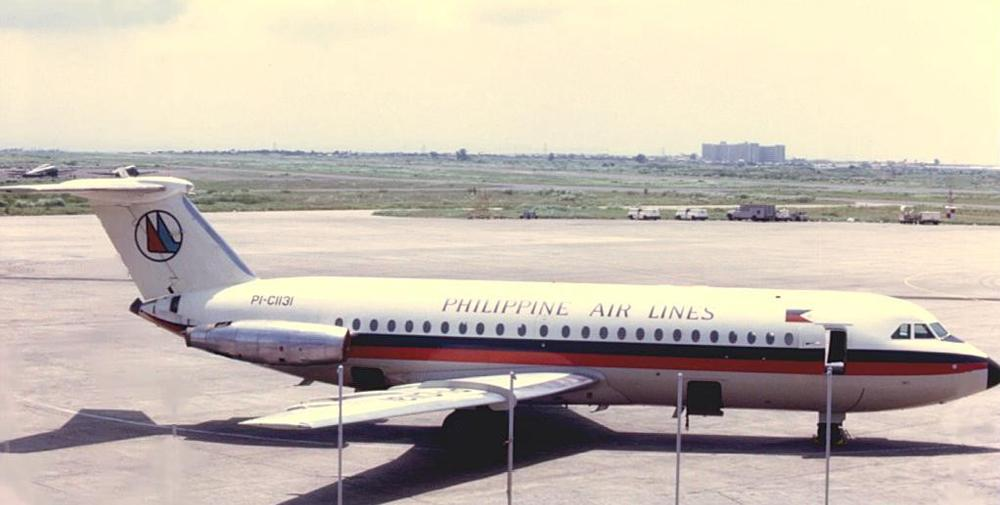
- PI-C1131, the aircraft involved in the accident

Accident
- Date: September 12, 1969
- Summary: Controlled flight into terrain
- Site: Kulaike, Antipolo, Rizal on approach to runway 24 at Manila International Airport

Aircraft
- Aircraft type: BAC One-Eleven
- Operator: Philippine Air Lines
- Registration: PI-C1131
- Flight origin: Mactan–Cebu International Airport, Lapu-Lapu City, Cebu, Philippines
- Destination: Manila International Airport, Pasay, Rizal, Philippines
- Passengers: 42
- Crew: 5
- Fatalities: 45
- Injuries: 2
- Survivors: 2

Philippine Air Lines Flight 158 was a flight from Mactan–Cebu International Airport to Manila International Airport near Manila which crashed on September 12, 1969. The aircraft, a BAC One-Eleven, struck a mango tree on the hill in sitio Kulaike, Antipolo, Rizal, located 22 km (12 nmi) east of its destination while on a VOR approach to runway 24. Of the 42 passengers and five crew members on board, only one passenger and one flight attendant survived. It was the deadliest aviation accident in the Philippines involving commercial aircraft until the crash of Philippine Airlines Flight 206 in 1987 and the deadliest involving a BAC One-Eleven until it was surpassed by Austral Líneas Aéreas Flight 9 in 1977.

== Aircraft ==
The aircraft involved was a BAC One-Eleven Series 400 and made its first flight in 1966. It was the first One-Eleven to be delivered to Philippine Air Lines, arriving the same year. The aircraft had over 7,000 airframe hours and 6,445 flight cycles at the time of the crash.

== Causes ==
The aircraft crashed due to high turbulence in a heavy rainstorm along with poor visibility at night.
