= BAC One-Eleven =

British short-range jet airliner (1963–2019)

One-Eleven
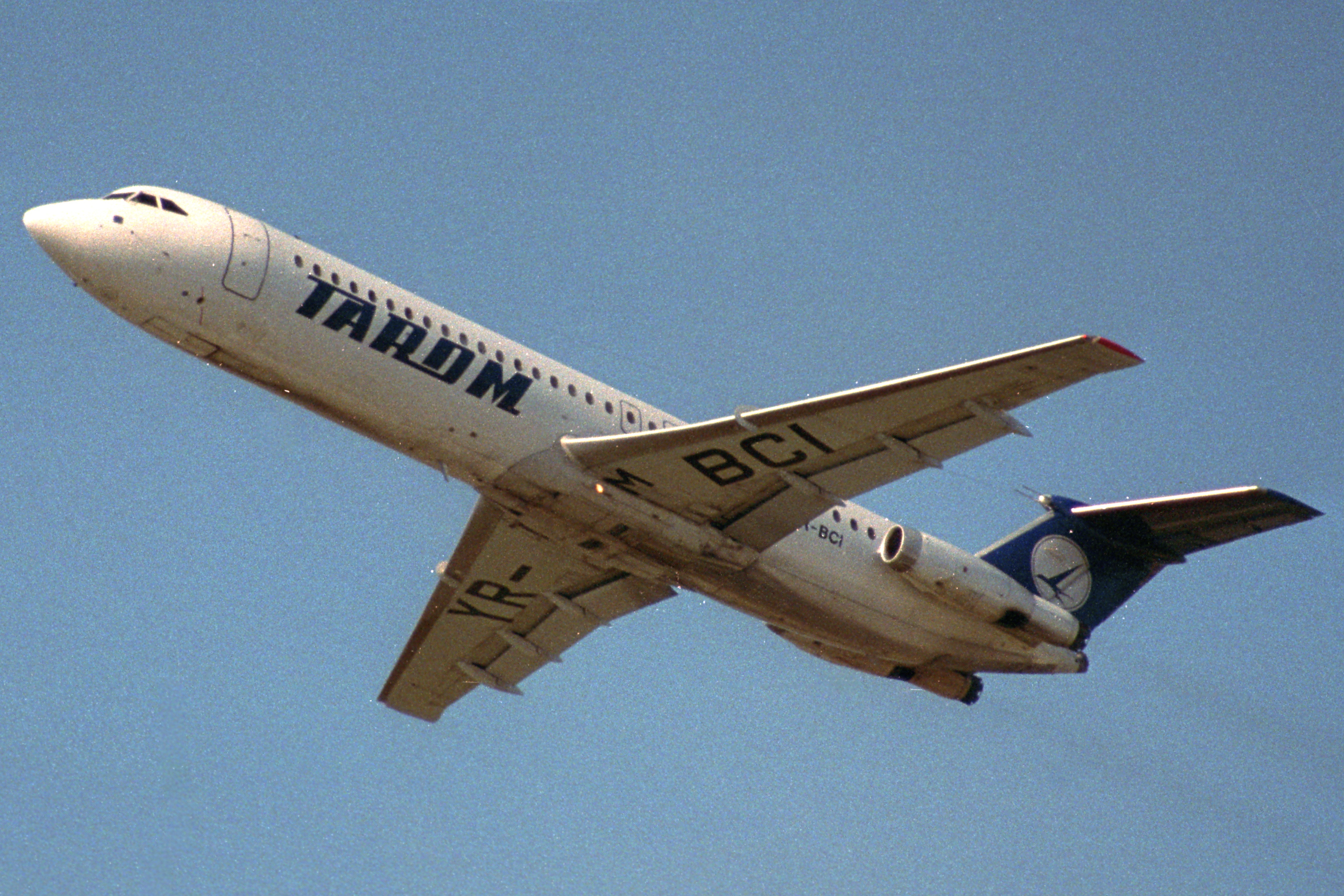
- A TAROM One-Eleven in 1995

General information
- Type: Short-range jet airliner
- National origin: United Kingdom
- Manufacturer: British Aircraft Corporation; Romaero
- Status: Retired
- Primary users: British Airways: American Airlines; Braniff Airways; British United Airways
- Number built: 244

History
- Manufactured: 1963–1982 (United Kingdom); 1982–1989 (Romania)
- Introduction date: 1965 with British United Airways
- First flight: 20 August 1963
- Retired: 7 May 2019 (Northrop Grumman)

The BAC One-Eleven (BAC-111, BAC 1-11) is a retired early jet airliner produced by the British Aircraft Corporation (BAC). Conceived by Hunting Aircraft as a 30-seat jet before its merger into BAC in 1960, it was launched as an 80-seat airliner with a British United Airways (BUA) order on 9 May 1961. The prototype conducted its maiden flight on 20 August 1963, and it was first delivered to BUA on 22 January 1965. The 119-seat, stretched 500 series was introduced in 1967. Total production amounted to 244 until 1982 in the United Kingdom including 1982 to 1989 in Romania where nine Rombac One-Elevens were licence-built by Romaero.

The short haul, narrowbody aircraft was powered by aft-mounted Rolls-Royce Spey low-bypass turbofans, a configuration similar to the earlier Sud Aviation Caravelle and later Douglas DC-9. It competed with early Boeing 737 models and was used by British, US, and European airlines, including Romanian operators. It was replaced by the newer Airbus A320 and later 737 variants, as well as by the Bombardier CRJ200 regional jet. Noise restrictions accelerated its transition to African carriers in the 1990s, and the last aircraft in service, used by Northrop Grumman as an airborne testbed, was retired in 2019.

== Development ==
=== Early development ===
The initial Hunting 107 concept from Hunting Aircraft

In the 1950s, although the pioneering de Havilland Comet had suffered disasters in service, strong passenger demand had been demonstrated for jet propulsion. Several manufacturers raced to release passenger jets, including those aimed at the short-haul market, such as the Sud Aviation Caravelle. In July 1956, British European Airways published a paper calling for a "second generation" jet airliner to operate beside their existing turboprop designs. This led to a variety of designs from the British aerospace industry. Hunting Aircraft started design studies on a jet-powered replacement for the successful Vickers Viscount, developing the 30-seat Hunting 107. Around the same time, Vickers started a similar development of a 140-seat derivative of its VC10 project, the VC11. Many other aviation firms also produced designs.

In 1960 Hunting, under British government pressure, merged with Vickers-Armstrongs, Bristol, and English Electric to form British Aircraft Corporation (BAC). The new BAC decided that the Hunting project had merit, but that there would be little market for a 30-seat jet airliner. The design was reworked into the BAC 107, a 59-seat airliner powered by two 7,000 pounds-force (31 kN) Bristol Siddeley BS75 turbofan engines. BAC also continued development of the larger, 140-seat VC-11 development of the Vickers VC10 which it had inherited. Other competing internal projects, such as the Bristol Type 200, were quickly abandoned following absorption of Hunting into BAC.

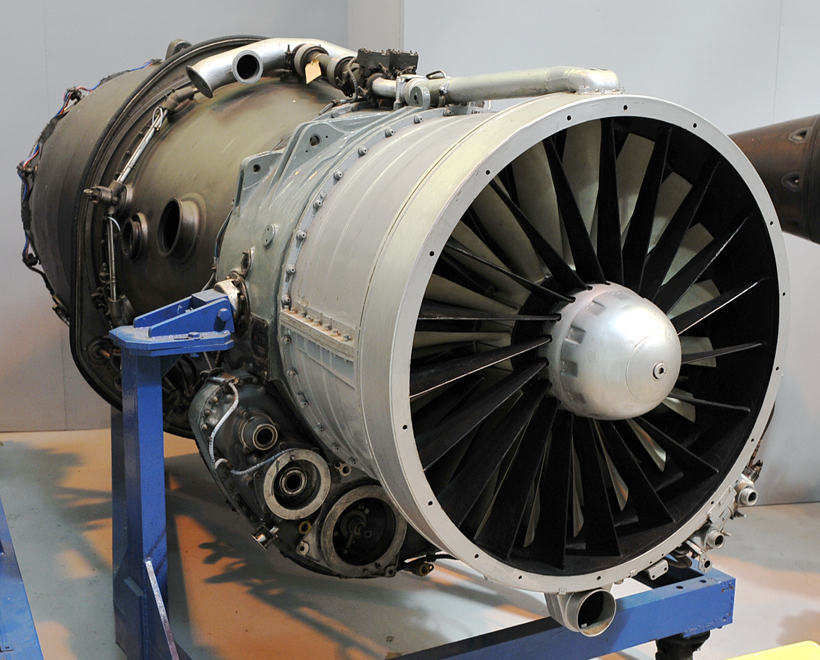
The selected Rolls-Royce Spey low-bypass turbofan

Market research showed the 59-seat BAC 107 was too small, and the design was reworked in 1961, with passenger capacity growing to 80 seats, and BS75s being discarded in favour of Rolls-Royce Speys. The revised design was redesignated the BAC 111 (later known as the One-Eleven), with BAC abandoning the VC11 project to concentrate on the more promising One-Eleven. Unlike contemporary British airliners such as the Hawker Siddeley Trident, the One-Eleven was not designed specifically to meet the needs of the state-owned British European Airways or British Overseas Airways Corporation, but on the needs of airlines around the world, and BAC expected orders for as many as 400.

On 9 May 1961 the One-Eleven was publicly launched when British United Airways placed the first order for ten One-Eleven 200s. On 20 October Braniff International Airways in the United States ordered six. Mohawk Airlines sent representatives to Europe seeking out a new aircraft to bring them into the jet era, and on 24 July 1962 concluded an agreement for four One-Elevens. Orders followed from Kuwait Airways for three, and Central African Airways for two. Braniff subsequently doubled their order to 12, while Ireland's Aer Lingus ordered four. Western Airlines ordered ten but later cancelled. Bonanza Air Lines also ordered three in 1962 but was stopped by the US Civil Aeronautics Board (CAB), which claimed that subsidies would be needed to operate a jet on Bonanza's routes, an action claimed by some at the time to be protectionism. The CAB also stopped Frontier Airlines and Ozark Air Lines from ordering One-Elevens, although allowing Ozark to order the similar Douglas DC-9 and Frontier to order Boeing 727-100s. The CAB had also unsuccessfully tried to block Mohawk's orders.

In May 1963, BAC announced the One-Eleven 300 and 400. The new versions used the Mk. 511 version of the Spey with increased power, allowing more fuel upload and hence longer range. The difference between the 300 and 400 lay in the equipment and avionics, the 400 intended for sales in the United States and thus equipped with US instruments. On 17 July 1963, American Airlines ordered 15 aircraft, bringing the total to 60, plus options for 15. American Airlines eventually bought 30 of the 400-series, making the airline the largest customer of One-Elevens.

=== Prototypes ===
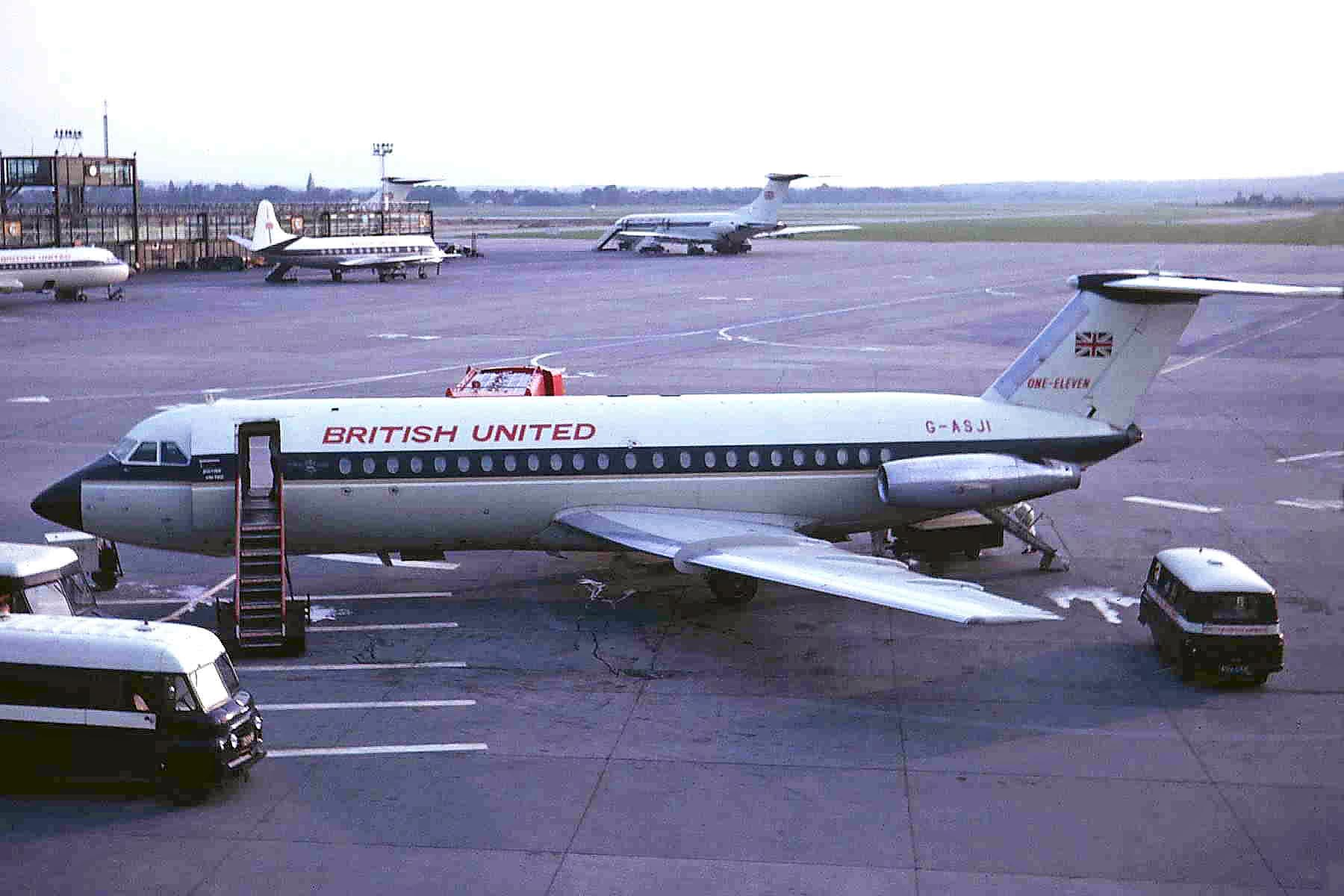
The first delivery was to British United Airways on 22 January 1965.

The prototype (G-ASHG) rolled out of Hurn assembly hall on 28 July 1963, at which point BAC had received orders for the type from a number of operators. On 20 August 1963, the prototype conducted its first flight, painted in BUA livery. The first flight had taken place almost a year before the Douglas DC-9, a rival American jetliner; BAC considered the One-Eleven to hold a technological edge. The One-Eleven's lead was of significant importance commercially, since, as shown by the Bonanza Air Lines case, US authorities could refuse to approve sales of foreign aircraft to domestic airlines where an American alternative existed (Bonanza ended up ordering and operating the DC-9). Test flying was conducted by Squadron Leader Dave Glaser.

The One-Eleven prototype, flown by test pilot Mike Lithgow, crashed on 22 October 1963 during stall testing, with the loss of all on board. The investigation led to the discovery of what became known as deep stall or superstall, a phenomenon caused by reduced airflow to the tailplane caused by the combined blanking effects of the wing and the aft-mounted engine nacelles at high angles of attack, which prevents recovery of normal (nose-down) flight. To prevent such stalls, BAC designed and added devices known as stick shakers and stick pushers to the One-Eleven's control system. It also redesigned the wing's leading edge to smooth airflow into the engines and over the tailplane. The specially modified aircraft used for testing this problem is now preserved at Brooklands Museum.

Despite the crash, testing continued and customer confidence remained high. American Airlines and Braniff took up their optional orders and placed more in February 1964. Further orders came from Mohawk, Philippine Airlines and German businessman Helmut Horten, who ordered the first executive modification of the aircraft. By the end of 1964, 13 aircraft had rolled off the production line. The One-Eleven was certified and the first handover, of G-ASJI to BUA, was on 22 January 1965. After several weeks of route-proving flights, the first revenue service flew on 9 April from Gatwick to Genoa. Braniff took delivery of its first aircraft on 11 March, while Mohawk received its first on 15 May. Deliveries continued, and by the end of 1965 airlines had received 34 aircraft. Demand remained buoyant, with a second production line set up at Weybridge – producing thirteen 1-11s between 1966 and 1970.

=== One-Eleven 500, 510ED and 475 ===
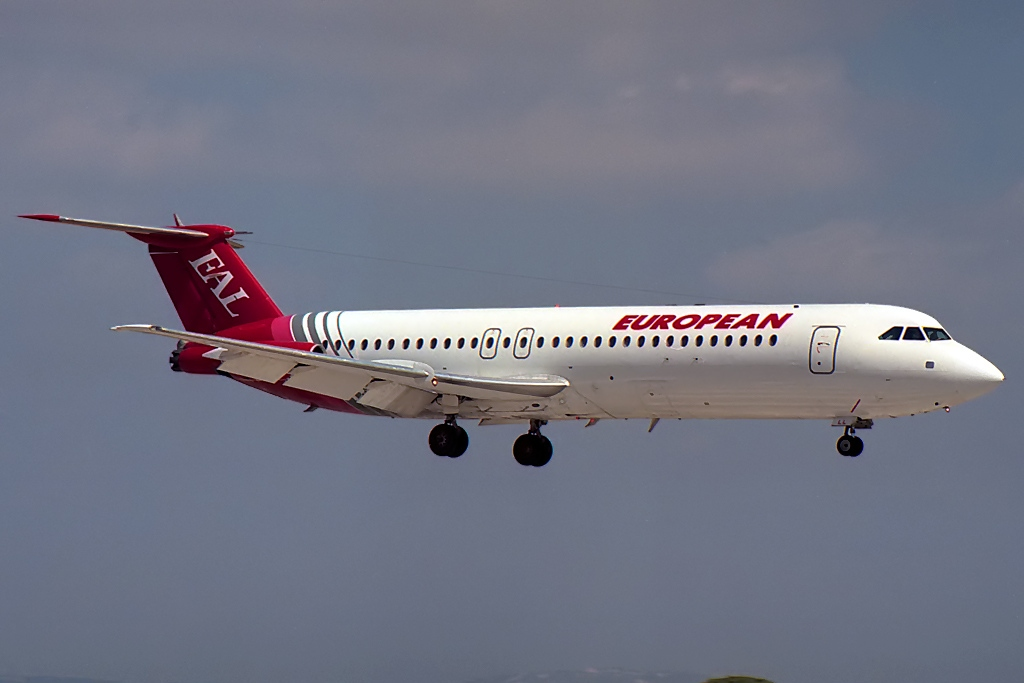
Introduced in 1967, the 500 series are stretched by 13.5 ft (4.1 m).

In 1967 a larger 119-seat version was introduced as the One-Eleven 500 (also known as Super One-Eleven). This "stretched" version was delayed for at least a year while its launch customer BEA assessed its requirements. This gave competing US aircraft (the Douglas DC-9 and Boeing 737) the opportunity to compensate for the One-Eleven's early penetration of the US domestic market. The British aircraft's initial one-year advantage now turned into a one-year delay, and the stretched series 500 failed to sell in the US. The type saw service with Cayman Airways and Leeward Islands Air Transport (LIAT) in the Caribbean with Cayman Airways operating the series 500 on scheduled services to Houston, Texas (IAH) and Miami, Florida (MIA), and LIAT flying its series 500s into San Juan, Puerto Rico (SJU). Bahamasair also operated the stretched 500 model with service between Nassau (NAS) and Miami among other routes while Guatemalan carrier Aviateca operated its series 500 aircraft into both Miami and New Orleans, Louisiana (MSY). Costa Rican airline LACSA operated the series 500 as well on its services to Miami. Another air carrier which operated the series 500 into Miami was Belize Airways Ltd.

Compared with earlier versions, the One-Eleven 500 was longer by 8 ft 4in (2.54 m) ahead of the wing and 5 ft 2in (1.57 m) behind it. The wing span was increased by 5 ft (1.5 m), and the latest Mk. 512 version of the Spey was used. The new version sold reasonably well across the world, particularly to European charter airlines. In 1971 it received an incremental upgrade to reduce drag and reduce runway requirements.

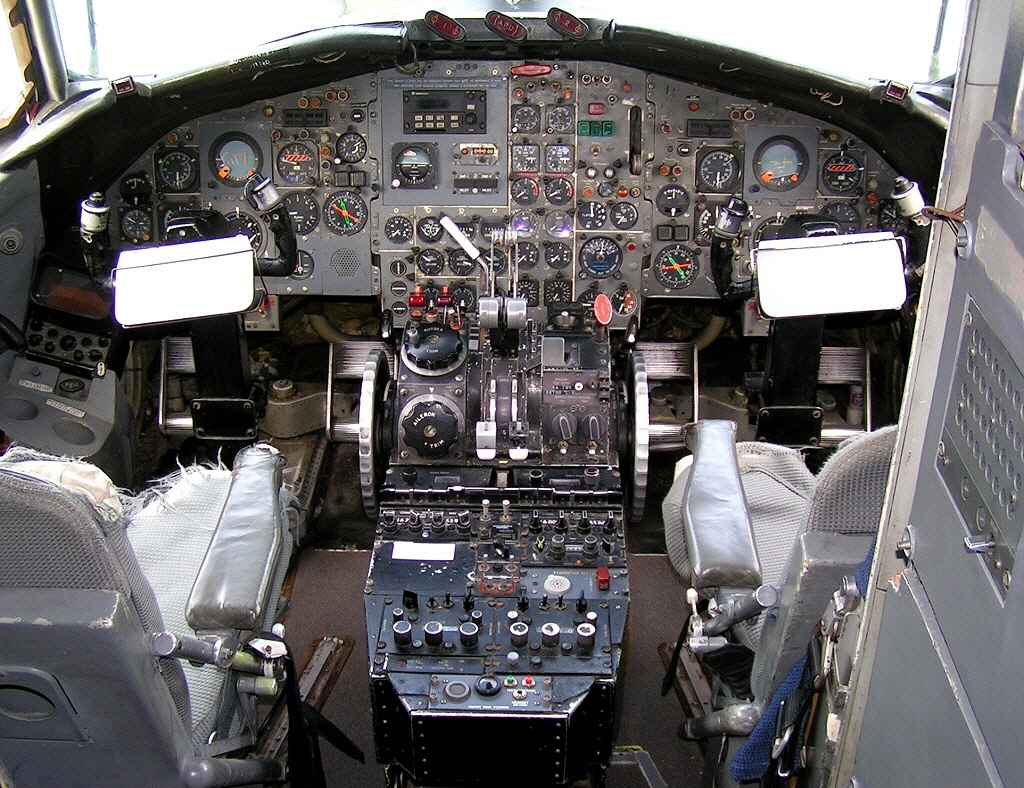
The 510ED cockpit, similar to the Hawker Siddeley Trident

BEA/British Airways 500 series aircraft (denoted One-Eleven 510ED) varied significantly from other One-Elevens, at BEA's request. The One-Eleven 510ED had a modified cockpit which incorporated instrumentation and avionics from or similar to that of the Hawker Siddeley Trident, for better commonality with the type. Their additional equipment included a more sophisticated autopilot, which allowed autoland in CAT II and included an autothrottle. The modifications went as far as reversing the "on" position of most switches to match that of the Trident; indeed, the 510ED was so different from other One-Elevens and 500 series aircraft that a different type rating was required to fly it.

Having faced competition from US aircraft by 1966, by 1970 the One-Eleven also faced competition from newer, smaller aircraft such as the Fokker F28 Fellowship. The F28 was lighter, less complex, and cheaper. The One-Eleven 475 of 1970 was launched to compete with the F28. It combined the 400 fuselage with the higher power and larger wing of the 500 and was intended for hot and high as well as rough airfield operations; however only ten One-Eleven Mk 475s were sold with one airline being Faucett Peru which operated its series 475 aircraft on scheduled domestic services into several airports with unpaved gravel runways in Peru. In 1977, the One-Eleven 670, a quiet and updated 475, was offered to the Japanese domestic market, also failing to sell.

=== Proposed developments ===
The BAC X-Eleven would have been stretched for up to 160 seats and powered by larger CFM56 or JT10D turbofans.

Total deliveries for 1965 were 34 aircraft, while 200 aircraft had been built by the end of 1971. At this point orders slowed to a trickle, with production being suspended in 1975, although marketing and design continued, and it was always planned to restart production when sufficient orders had been received. BAC restarted production in 1977 as a result of an order for five aircraft by the Romanian airline Tarom. British production continued until 1984, with a total of 235 aircraft built in Britain. There were two reasons why the production line was kept open for just 35 aircraft delivered over 11 years: first, BAC hoped that Rolls-Royce would develop a quieter and more powerful version of the Spey engine, making possible further One-Eleven developments; second, throughout the early part of the period Romania was negotiating to buy the entire One-Eleven programme and transfer production of the type to Bucharest.

By 1974, BAC invested significant effort into launching the One-Eleven 700. This had a longer fuselage with a 134-seat interior and the projected 16,900 lbf (75 kN) Spey 606 engine producing greater power and less noise. The 700J was planned for the Japanese market, with the same stretched fuselage and engines as the 700 and a new high-lift wing for operation into regional airports with short runways. The 700 was approximately the same size as the latest DC-9s and 737s and would have been available in time to prevent large-scale defections by One-Eleven clients to McDonnell-Douglas and Boeing. Rolls-Royce was still recovering from bankruptcy, however, and the uprated Spey failed to materialise. An altogether less ambitious 700 made a reappearance in 1978 as a 500 with specially "hush-kitted" Speys which would be replaced by the proposed RB432 in the mid-1980s. This was offered to British Airways in competition with Boeing 737-200s, but was ultimately rejected.

In 1975, BAC launched the One-Eleven 800, a further stretched aircraft to be powered by two 22,000 lbf (98 kN) CFM International CFM56 high-bypass turbofans and seating 144 to 161 passengers, but this project was abandoned in 1976 in favour of a new derivative of the One-Eleven with a wider fuselage capable of six-abreast seating. This new airliner was unveiled later that year as the X-Eleven, which would be powered by two CFM-56s or Pratt & Whitney JT10D engines and seat up 166 passengers. In 1977, BAC merged with Hawker Siddeley to form British Aerospace (BAe) and the new company was faced with the choice of developing the X-Eleven or joining European efforts to design an-all new aircraft. In the end, BAe became a full member of Airbus, and the X-Eleven was abandoned, with the European alternative becoming the Airbus A320.

The BAC Two-Eleven and Three-Eleven were British airliner studies proposed by the British Aircraft Corporation in the late 1960s which never made it to production.

=== Rombac production ===
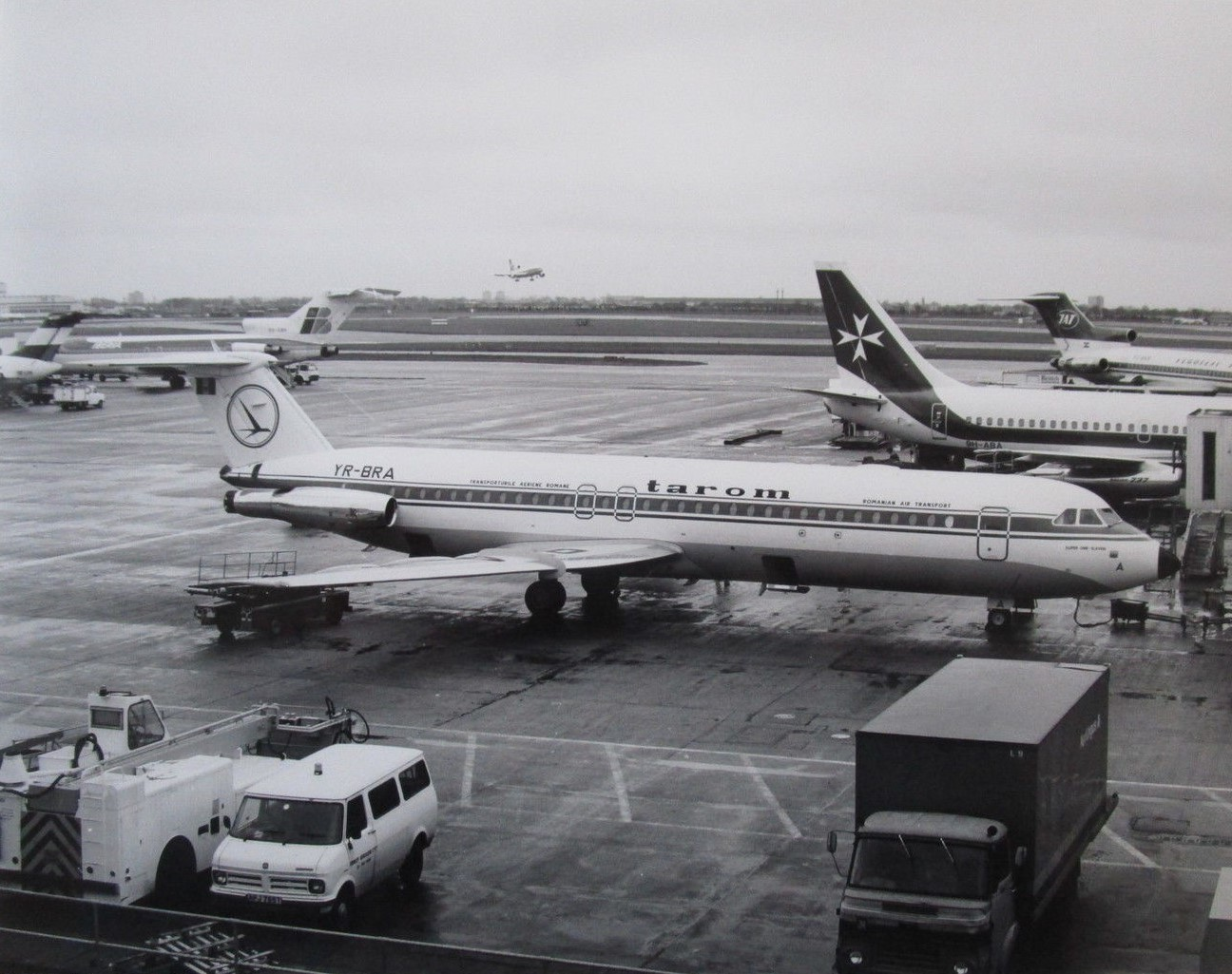
The first Rombac 1-11 was delivered to TAROM on 29 December 1982.

On 9 June 1979, Romanian president Nicolae Ceaușescu signed a contract for One-Eleven licence production in Romania. This was to involve the delivery of three complete One-Elevens (two 500-series aircraft and one 475 series) plus the construction of at least 22 in Bucharest, with the reduction of British (and thus increase of Romanian) content. It also involved Romanian production of Rolls-Royce Spey engines and certification of the aircraft to British standards by the Civil Aviation Authority. A market for up to 80 Romanian-built aircraft was projected at the time, largely in China and other developing economies, and possibly Eastern Europe. The aircraft was redesignated Rombac 1-11. The Spey 512-14 DW engines were produced under license by Turbomecanica Bucharest.

The first Rombac One-Eleven, (YR-BRA cn 401) a series 561RC, was rolled out at Romaero Băneasa factory on 27 August 1982 and first flew on 18 September 1982. Production continued until 1989 at a much slower pace than foreseen in the contract. Nine aircraft were delivered, with the 10th and 11th aircraft on the production line being abandoned when they were 85% and 70% complete. The first aircraft was delivered to TAROM on 29 December 1982. The Romanian carrier took delivery of all but two of the aircraft produced, the remaining two going to Romavia, the last of which (YR-BRI cn 409) was delivered on 1 January 1993.

There were three reasons why the Rombac initiative failed. Romania's economy and international position deteriorated to the point where supplies needed for One-Eleven manufacturing slowed to a trickle, with hard currency restrictions delaying the delivery of components sourced outside Romania; the market foreseen by the Romanians failed to show an interest, though some Rombac machines were leased to European operators. The One-Eleven's noise level and fuel economy failed to keep pace with US and West European competition.

Adopting a new engine would have resolved noise and fuel economy issues. Following the fall of the Ceaușescu regime, plans were made to restart production using the Rolls-Royce Tay. British aircraft leasing company Associated Aerospace agreed a $1 billion deal to purchase 50 Tay-powered One-Elevens fitted with a new electronic glass cockpit for onward leasing to Western customers. The liquidation of Associated Aerospace in April 1991 stopped this deal. Despite this setback, Rombac continued to try to sell the One-Eleven, with US operator Kiwi International Air Lines placing a firm order for 11 Tay-engined aircraft with options for an additional five, but these plans never happened.

== Operational history ==
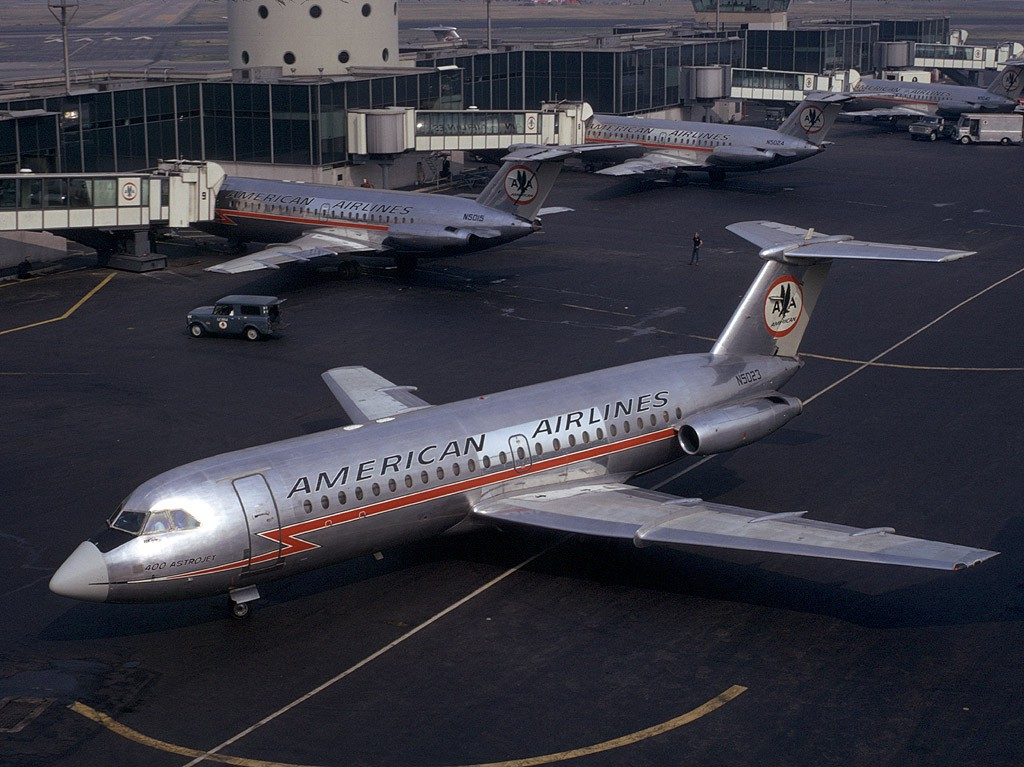
Several American Airlines BAC One-Elevens at LaGuardia Airport

Once in service, the One Eleven found itself in competition with the Douglas DC-9, and was joined by another competitor, the Boeing 737, only a year after its introduction. Advantages over the DC-9 included a lower unit cost. The DC-9 offered more seating, and its engines were interchangeable with those on the Boeing 727. These factors led to Trans Australia Airlines choosing to purchase the DC-9 instead. In the US, the Civil Aeronautics Board was sceptical of smaller operators' need for jet aircraft and withheld financing, leading to several US customers cancelling their One-Eleven orders.

Mohawk Airlines became both the first American operator of the type and the first airline in the US to operate jet aircraft on short haul routes. On 25 June 1965, Mohawk introduced its first One-Eleven into passenger service; by the end of the decade, the airline operated a fleet of 20 BAC One-Elevens. Buying the jets pushed Mohawk into debt and this, along with an economic downturn and strike action, led to its forced merger with Allegheny Airlines which in turn continued to operate the One-Eleven. In July 1963, American Airlines had placed an order for 15 400-series One-Elevens for £14 million; this was the first time American Airlines had purchased a foreign aircraft type for its fleet. Braniff International Airways, another major US air carrier, also ordered the One-Eleven. Aloha Airlines selected the One-Eleven as its first jet type for interisland service in the Hawaiian Islands.

Several British operators, including Dan Air and British Caledonian, made extensive use of the type. Dan Air increased the number of One-Elevens it had in service in the 1970s, eventually replacing its aging de Havilland Comets with the One-Eleven entirely in the 1980s. The type became the airline's main revenue generator. Dan Air would often lease One-Elevens, including Rombac-produced aircraft, to meet short-term demands. During periods of low demand Dan Air would lease its own One-Elevens to other operators. British Caledonian and Dan Air One-Elevens would often be exchanged between the two airlines on temporary and permanent arrangements. Passenger demand grew on several key One-Eleven routes, exceeding the Series 500's larger capacity during the 1980s, which began to force airlines to use other planes.

Before the formation of British Airways (BA), some of its predecessor companies, British European Airways and Cambrian Airways, operated fleets of One-Elevens that were later integrated into BA's fleet. BA's Regional Division found the performance of the One-Eleven more than adequate and sought to expand operations with the type, including further acquisitions, in the early 1970s in part to replace Vickers Viscounts. BA's 400-Series One-Elevens were all named after areas and locations in the English Midlands, reflecting the type's new base at Birmingham Airport. BA ordered more Series-500 aircraft in the late 1970s and the airline received some of the last British-made One-Elevens.

British Caledonian had begun replacing its One-Elevens with the new Airbus A320 when it was merged with British Airways in 1987 due to financial problems. In both Caledonian and British Airways service, the One-Elevens were a dominant type for the operator's European routes. BA proceeded to rationalise its fleets, retiring many overlapping types, the One-Eleven being gradually phased out for the more modern A320 and Boeing 737 jetliners. The last aircraft was removed from regular service with BA in October 1992. A number of ex-BA aircraft saw service with Maersk Air before, in turn, being replaced by the Bombardier CRJ200 in the late 1990s.

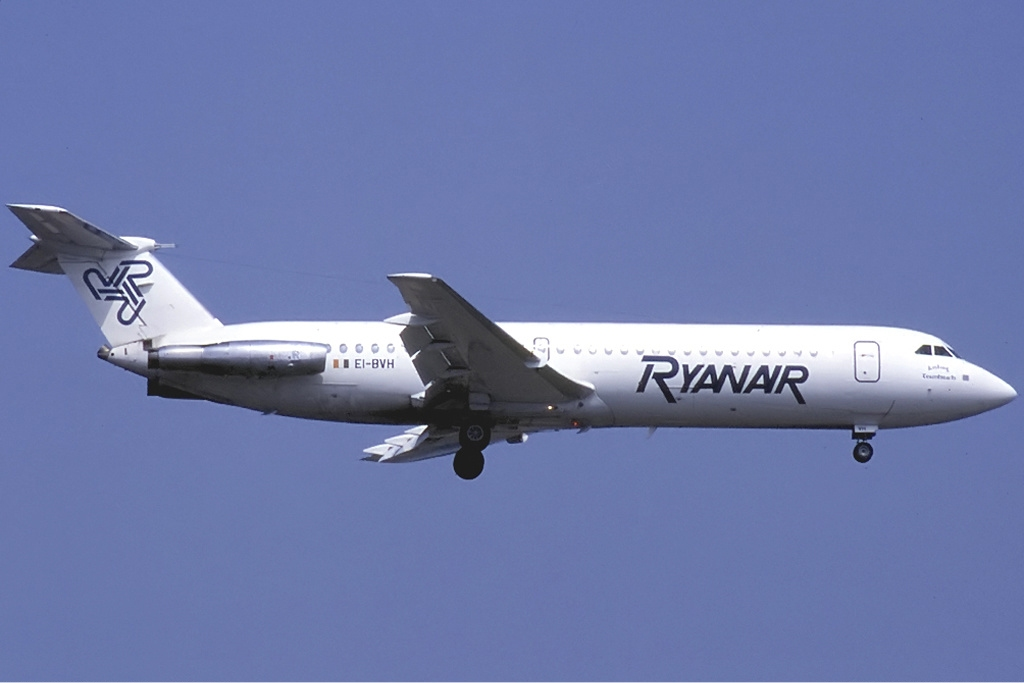
A Ryanair One-Eleven 500 with "hush kits"

One-Elevens first saw Irish service with Aer Lingus, which flew the type in both the scheduled and charter markets for three decades. The aircraft was used on less-busy European routes into the 1990s. The One-Eleven was important in budget airline Ryanair's early years: it had sought an aircraft for low-fare scheduled services from regional airports, and obtained One-Elevens. The first of these, a Rombac-produced 500-Series, entered service on the Dublin–Luton route on 1 December 1986. Ryanair's fleet expanded to six aircraft by 1988, with three leased from Romania. These leased aircraft were later replaced with former BA One-Elevens. Ultimately Ryanair replaced the One-Eleven with the Boeing 737 in the mid-1990s.

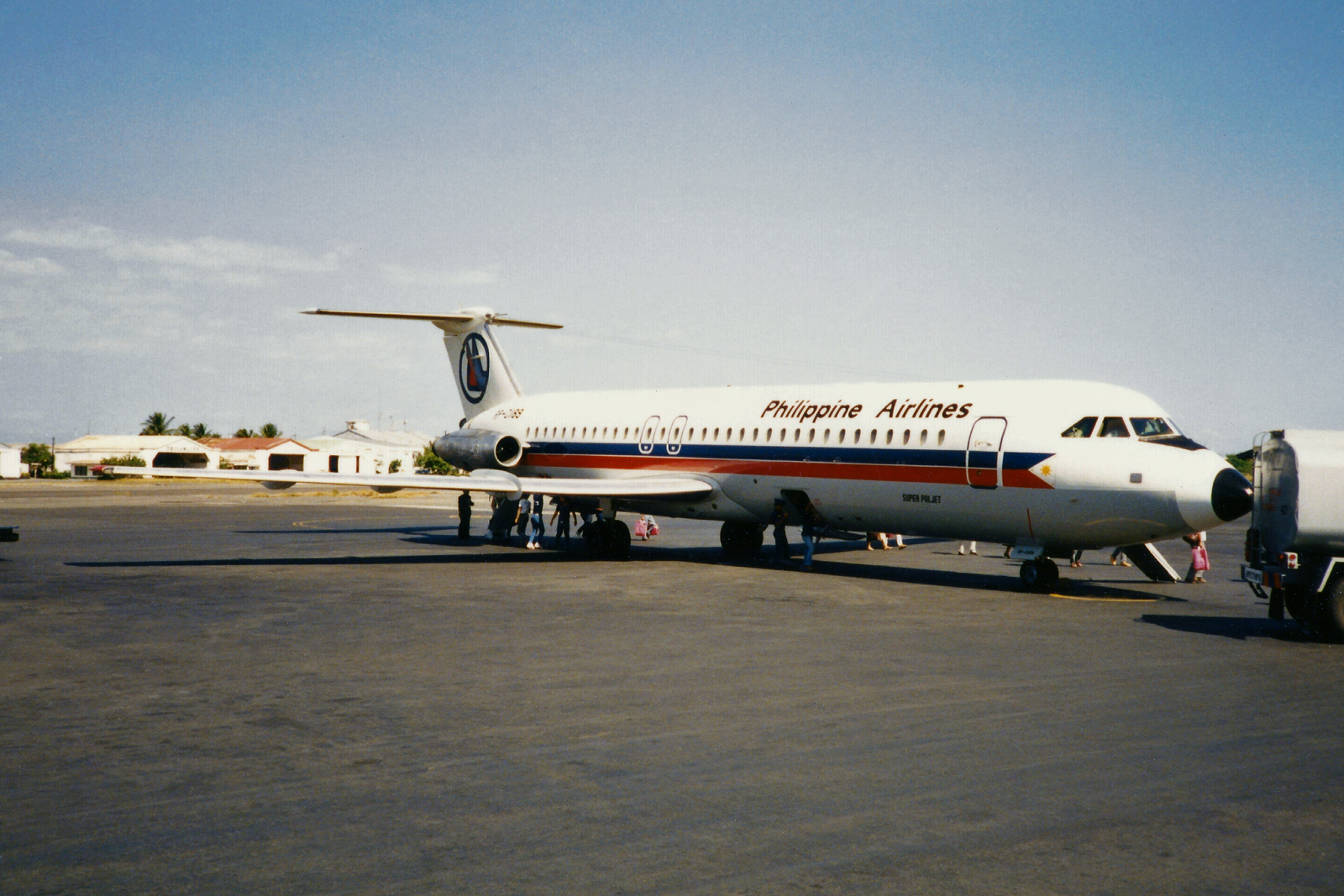
Philippine Airlines was the largest One-Eleven operator in the Asia-Pacific region with a total of 17 examples operated between 1966 and 1992.

In April 1966, Philippine Airlines began operating four One-Eleven 400s in revenue service to replace its older Vickers Viscounts on domestic and short or medium-haul international routes. It later introduced the larger 500-Series in 1971 as replacements for its 400-Series aircraft and, until 1992, operated 13 examples, of which only five were acquired brand new while the rest were purchased secondhand from other airlines. One of these aircraft notably suffered two separate in-flight bomb explosions but was repaired after both incidents and continued in service until 1992. In another high-profile incident on 21 May 1982, an individual by the name of John Clearno tried to hijack a Philippine Airlines One-Eleven 500 while on the ground, but was eventually overpowered by the cockpit crew following hours of negotiation. No passengers or crew were injured. Philippine Airlines replaced the type with the Boeing 737 from 1989 onwards, and the last 500-Series aircraft was retired on May 31, 1992, ending 26 years of continuous One-Eleven operations.

Romania was a major customer for British-produced One-Elevens, with several large orders in the 1970s. These aircraft were often fitted with equipment such as engine 'hush kits'. In May 1977, a major cooperation agreement between British Aerospace and the Romanian government was signed, and this led to a gradual One-Eleven technology transfer to Romania. Full contracts for licence production under the Rombac name followed two years later. Complete airframes and components were provided to assist in the venture. All Rombac One-Elevens manufactured by Romaero were delivered to TAROM and Romavia, which leased them to airlines across both Eastern and Western Europe. Rombac-produced One-Elevens would be adopted by many emerging operators globally, including Lauda Air in Austria, and Aero Asia International in Pakistan. Two planes served as the private jets of Romanian communist leaders Nicolae Ceaușescu and Ion Iliescu during 1986 to 1989. Due to the planes are "extreme rarity and significance for the technical history of Romania," they were added to the “treasure” category of Romania’s mobile cultural heritage in 2021, not allowed to leave the country. Under the BAC licence, 9 planes were made in Romania. Some of them served in a small airline, LAR, its sole destination being Tel Aviv.

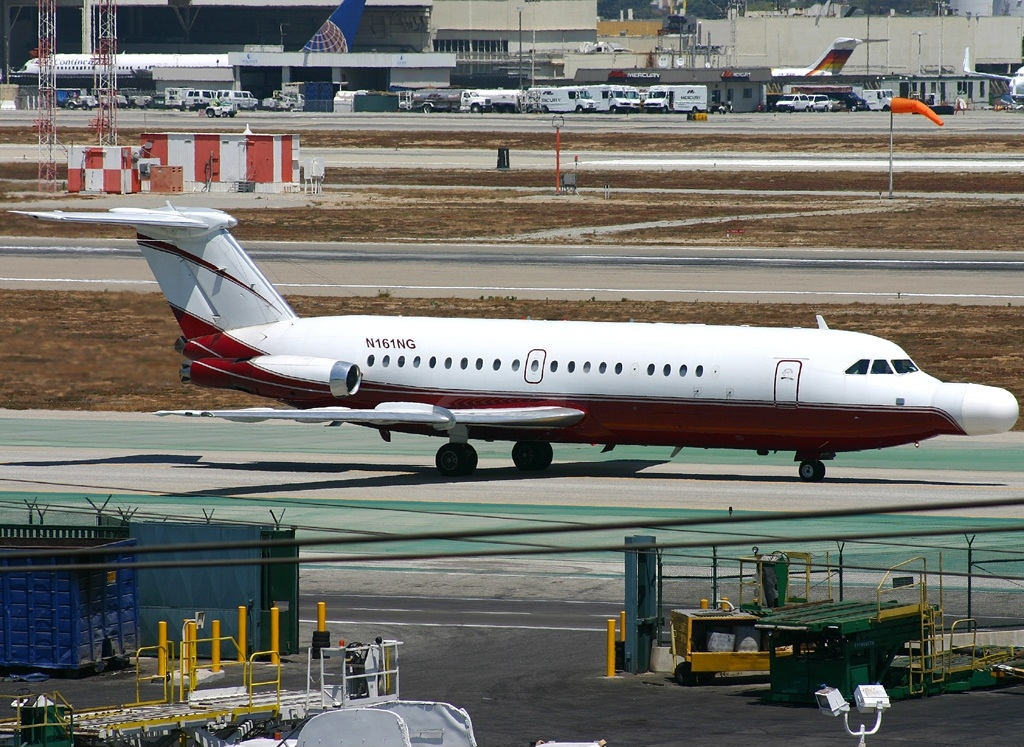
The last flyable One-Eleven was by Northrop Grumman after serving as an F-35 testbed.

One-Elevens remained in widespread use with European operators into the 1990s. Once retired from major operators, they were often sold to smaller airlines, often in the Far East and Africa. Nigeria was a major operator until the type was grounded after a crash in 2002. A major factor for the withdrawal from European service of remaining One-Elevens was the Stage III noise abatement regulations, which came into effect from March 2003. Bringing the Rolls-Royce Spey engines into compliance with the noise regulations with hush kits was expensive, and many European operators chose to dispose of the type from their fleets. In 2010, the European Aviation Safety Agency accepted an Airbus request to revoke the Type Certificate for the BAC One-Eleven. As a result, BAC One-Eleven aircraft registered in any EU Member State are no longer eligible for a normal certificate of airworthiness. In December 2012, the last operational One-Eleven in the UK, which had continued to fly as a military aircraft, was retired. Eventually, on 7 May 2019, the last flyable One-Eleven was retired by Northrop Grumman after serving as an F-35 testbed.

== Variants ==
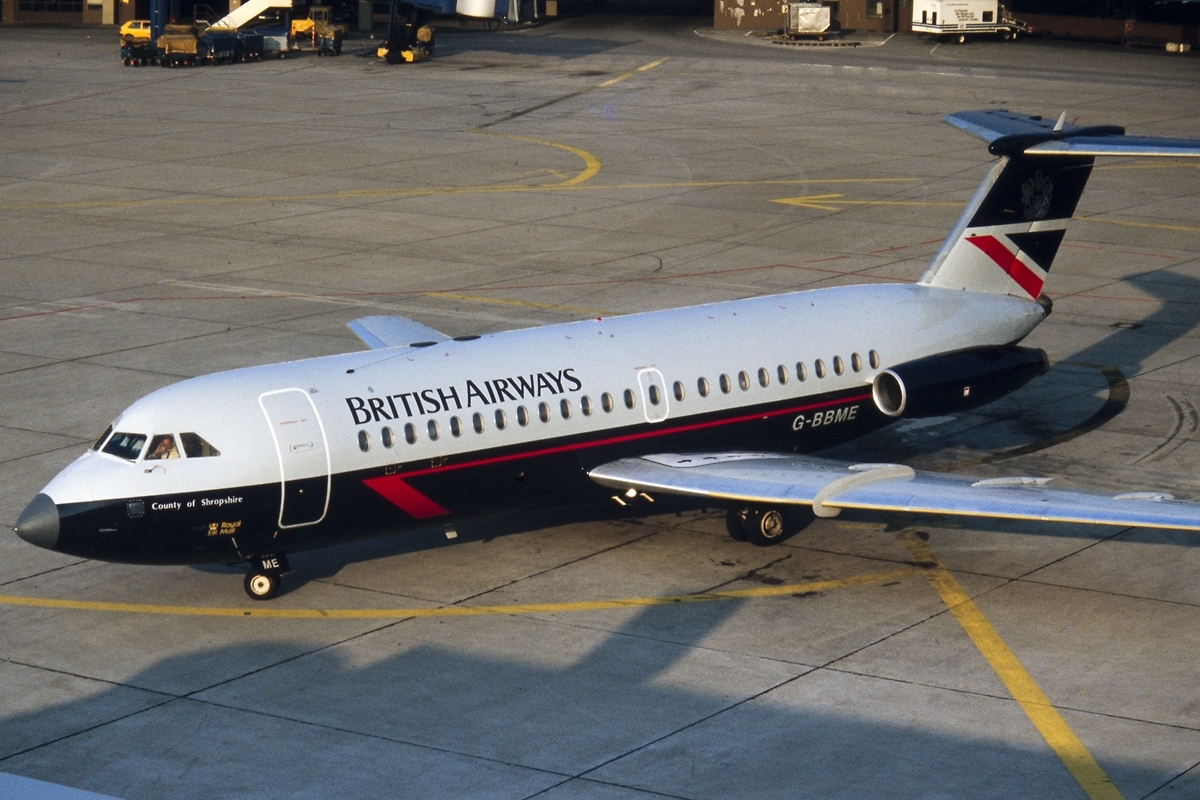
The initial variants are 93.5 ft (28.5 m) long to accommodate up to 89 seats with a single overwing exit per side.

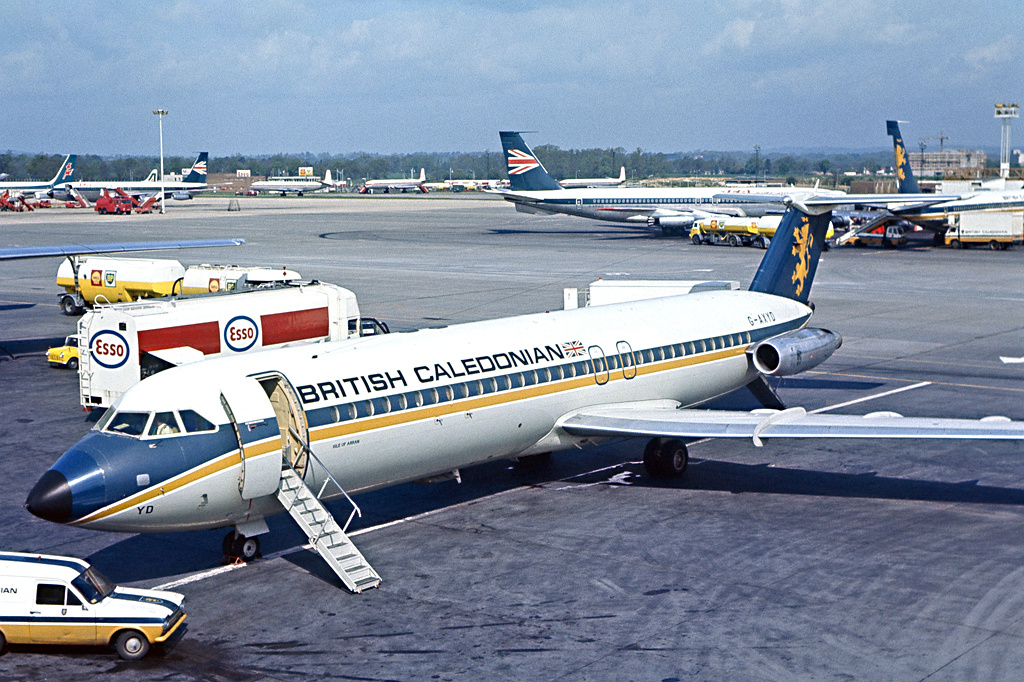
The later 500 series are 107 ft (33 m) long, to accommodate up to 119 seats, with two overwing exits.

One-Eleven 200
Initial production version, 10,410 pounds-force (46.3 kN) Spey Mk 506 engines.; individual customer designations within this series. 56 built.
One-Eleven 217
Version for the RAAF using a 200 series fuselage with RR Spey Mk511-14 engines, low-pressure tyres, a navigator's station and a sextant hatch in the cockpit ceiling. Two built.
One-Eleven 300
Uprated engines (11,400 pounds-force (51 kN) Spey Mk 511s), more fuel for longer range; individual customer designations within this series. 9 built.
One-Eleven 400
Series 300 with American instrumentation and equipment; individual customer designations within this series. 69 built.
One-Eleven 475
Series 400 body with Series 500 wing and powerplant plus rough-airfield landing gear and body protection. 6 built.
One-Eleven 485GD
Similar to 475, 3 for Oman.
Rombac 1-11-495
Planned Romanian-built version of the Series 475. None completed.
One-Eleven 500
Extended body version with up to 119 seats and longer span wings. Fitted with more powerful engines (12,550 pounds-force (55.8 kN) Spey 512s); individual customer designations within this series. 86 built.
One-Eleven 510ED
Variant of the 500 series built for BEA/British Airways. Size and engines same as other 500s, cockpit modified to provide more commonality with HS.121 Trident and required a different type rating from all other 500 series One-Elevens.
Rombac 1-11-560
Romanian-built version of the Series 500. Nine completed.
One-Eleven 670
Series 475 with improved aerodynamics and reduced noise; one converted from Series 475.
VC-92
Brazilian Air Force designation of the One-Eleven 423ET, Known by its call sign Brazilian Air Force One.
One-Eleven 800
Proposed extended body version with up to 161 seats, planned to be fitted with 22,000 pounds-force (98 kN) CFM International CFM56 high-bypass turbofan engines. Cancelled in 1976 in favour of the wider-bodied BAC X-Eleven design, The subsequent BAC X-Eleven project was integrated into the Joint European Transport (JET) studies after British Aerospace was formed and rejoined Airbus in 1978, with its twin-engine, single-aisle concepts serving as the technological foundation for the Airbus A320 family while securing BAe's long-term role in designing and manufacturing the wings.; none built.

== Operators ==
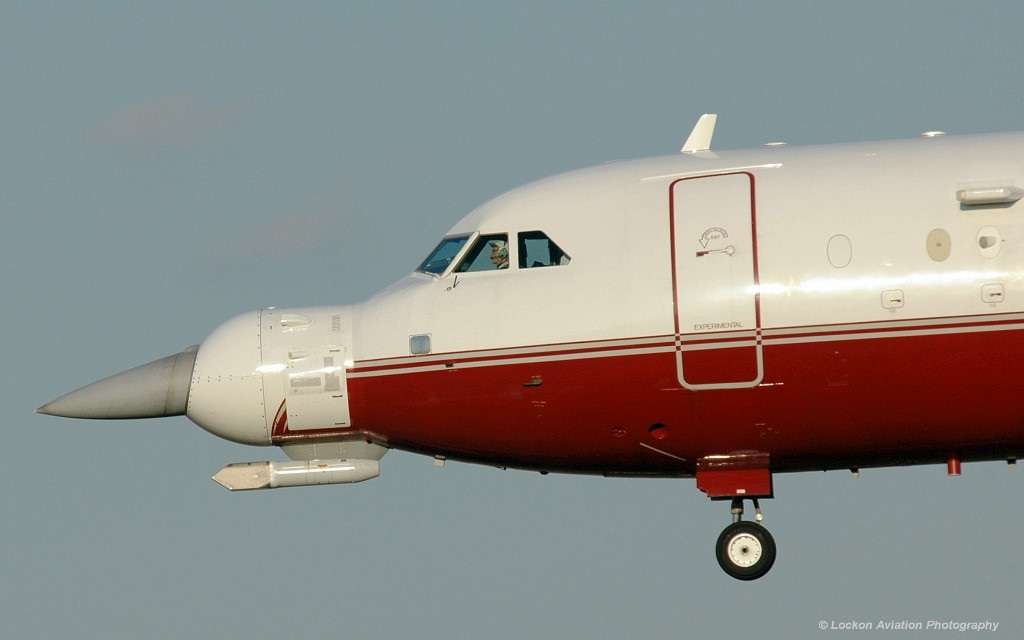
The last aircraft in service, used by Northrop Grumman as an airborne testbed, was retired in 2019.

The BAC One-Eleven was widely used by civil and military operators.

After the One-Eleven's type certificate had been withdrawn, they flew as experimental aircraft in the research and development category.

On 6 May 2019, the last aircraft still in service, used by Northrop Grumman as an airborne test bed for the F-35 programme, was retired.

== Notable accidents and incidents ==
=== Accidents with fatalities ===
- On 22 October 1963, a prototype aircraft crashed during a test flight, while testing stall conditions near Chicklade in Wiltshire, England. All seven crew members were killed. This was not a production-model plane and this incident is described more fully in the Development section above.
- On 6 August 1966, Braniff International Airways Flight 250 disintegrated in mid-air after flying into a severe thunderstorm near Falls City, Nebraska. It was en route to Omaha, Nebraska, from Kansas City, Missouri. Thirty-eight passengers and four crew members were killed in the crash. The plane was a BAC One-Eleven-203AE.
- On 23 June 1967, a Mohawk Airlines One-Eleven-204AF while flying Mohawk Airlines Flight 40 suffered a loss of pitch control following an on-board fire that caused heavy damage in the tail area. Flight 40 was a regularly scheduled passenger flight between Elmira, New York and Washington, DC. It crashed outside Blossburg, Pennsylvania with the loss of all 34 passengers and crew. The fire was traced to the auxiliary power unit (APU); as a direct result of this accident in-flight use of the APU was banned.
- On 12 September 1969, a Philippine Airlines BAC One-Eleven registration PI-C1131 operating as Flight 158 en route from Mactan–Cebu International Airport in Cebu to Manila International Airport (now Ninoy Aquino Airport) in Manila, Philippines struck a mango tree on the hill in suburban Kula-ike, Antipolo, Rizal, 12 nautical miles (14 mi; 22 km) east of its destination while on a VOR approach to runway 24. There were 47 people on board, of which 45 were killed. One passenger and one flight steward survived, but both were hospitalized with burns. The crash was the worst air disaster in the Philippines involving commercial aircraft until 1987.
- On 7 December 1970, a TAROM One-Eleven 424EU flying from Tel Aviv to Bucharest crashed on approach to the Mihail Kogălniceanu International Airport after having been diverted from its original destination. The accident occurred due to deteriorating weather and 19 of the 24 occupants were killed.
- On 6 September 1971, a One-Eleven 515FB operating as Paninternational Flight 112 collided with a bridge during an emergency landing on the A7 Autobahn in Hamburg, shearing off both wings after a double engine failure during takeoff. The water injection system had inadvertently been filled with jet fuel instead of water. Twenty-two of the 121 people aboard died.
- On 18 April 1974, Court Line Flight 95, operated by One-Eleven 528 G-AXMJ was involved in a ground collision with Piper PA-23 Aztec G-AYDE at London Luton Airport due to the Aztec entering the active runway without clearance. The pilot of the Aztec was killed and his passenger was injured. All 91 on board the One-Eleven safely left the aircraft after take-off was aborted.
- On 21 November 1977, Austral Líneas Aéreas Flight 9 flying from Buenos Aires to San Carlos de Bariloche, suffered pressurisation problems whilst climbing to 35,000 feet. Later on approach into San Carlos de Bariloche International Airport, the plane struck terrain and crashed. All five crew and 41 of 74 passengers were killed.
- On 7 May 1981, Austral Líneas Aéreas Flight 901 crashed on approach into Jorge Newbery Airport, Buenos Aires, after a flight from San Miguel de Tucumán. The likely cause was the weather and pilot error. All 5 crew and 26 passengers were killed.
- On 21 July 1989, Philippine Airlines Flight 124 overran the runway when attempting a landing at Ninoy Aquino International Airport, Manila. None of the 98 passengers on board were killed, but eight people on the ground died when the aircraft came to a stop on an adjacent highway.
- On 26 June 1991, an Okada Air flight ran out of fuel while on approach to Sokoto Airport and crashed during a forced landing, killing four passengers.
- On 18 September 1994, an Oriental Airlines flight carrying Nigerian football team Iwuanyanwu Nationale FC home from a CAF Champions League quarterfinals match in Tunis crashed on its fourth landing attempt at Tamanrasset Airport. Five people on board died, including three crew and two passengers, both footballers for the team.
- On 29 July 1997, an ADC Airlines flight overshot the runway while landing at Calabar Airport, killing one person.
- On 4 May 2002, EAS Airlines Flight 4226 crashed in a suburb of Kano, Nigeria, shortly after takeoff, killing 73 of the 77 people on board and 30 more on the ground. This remains the worst crash of a BAC One-Eleven, with a total of 103 deaths.

=== Other incidents ===
- On 9 July 1978, Allegheny Airlines Flight 453 crash-landed at Greater Rochester International Airport while arriving from Boston Logan International Airport. The aircraft was carrying 77 people. According to the NTSB report, the flight landed on Runway 28 at too high a speed, but with sufficient performance capability to reject the landing. The pilots chose to continue the landing, the aircraft skidded off the end of the runway, and its landing gear were sheared off by a ditch. There were no fatalities but the aircraft was written off.
- On 4 August 1984, a Philippine Airlines flight overshot runway 36 and ended up in the sea when attempting a landing at Daniel Z. Romualdez Airport, Tacloban City, Philippines. All 70 passengers and five crew survived, while the aircraft was damaged beyond repair and written off.
- On 10 June 1990, British Airways Flight 5390's cockpit window blew out at altitude after incorrect bolts had been used to secure it. Captain Tim Lancaster was blown half out of the cockpit by the pressure differential; members of the cabin crew clung to his legs to keep him from being blown out of the aircraft. The plane made an emergency landing at Southampton Airport. The pilot survived, as did all the crew and passengers. An investigation revealed that the shift maintenance manager had used incorrect bolts as they were similar to the bolts which had been previously used on the aircraft; he replaced them at a like for like ratio. 84 of the 90 bolts used to secure the window were too small in diameter, whilst the remaining six were too short in length.

== Aircraft on display ==
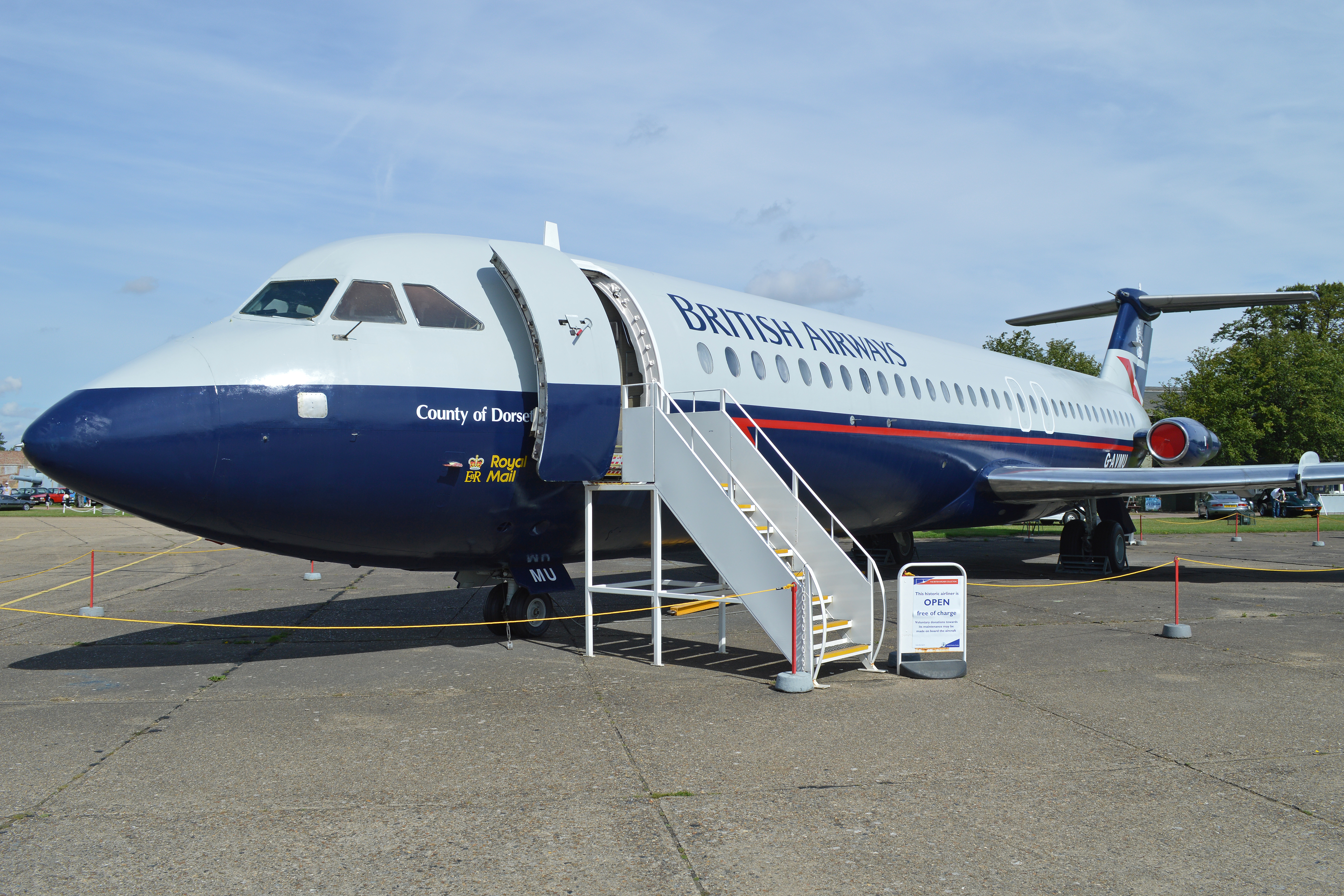
One-Eleven 510ED County of Dorset on display at the Imperial War Museum Duxford

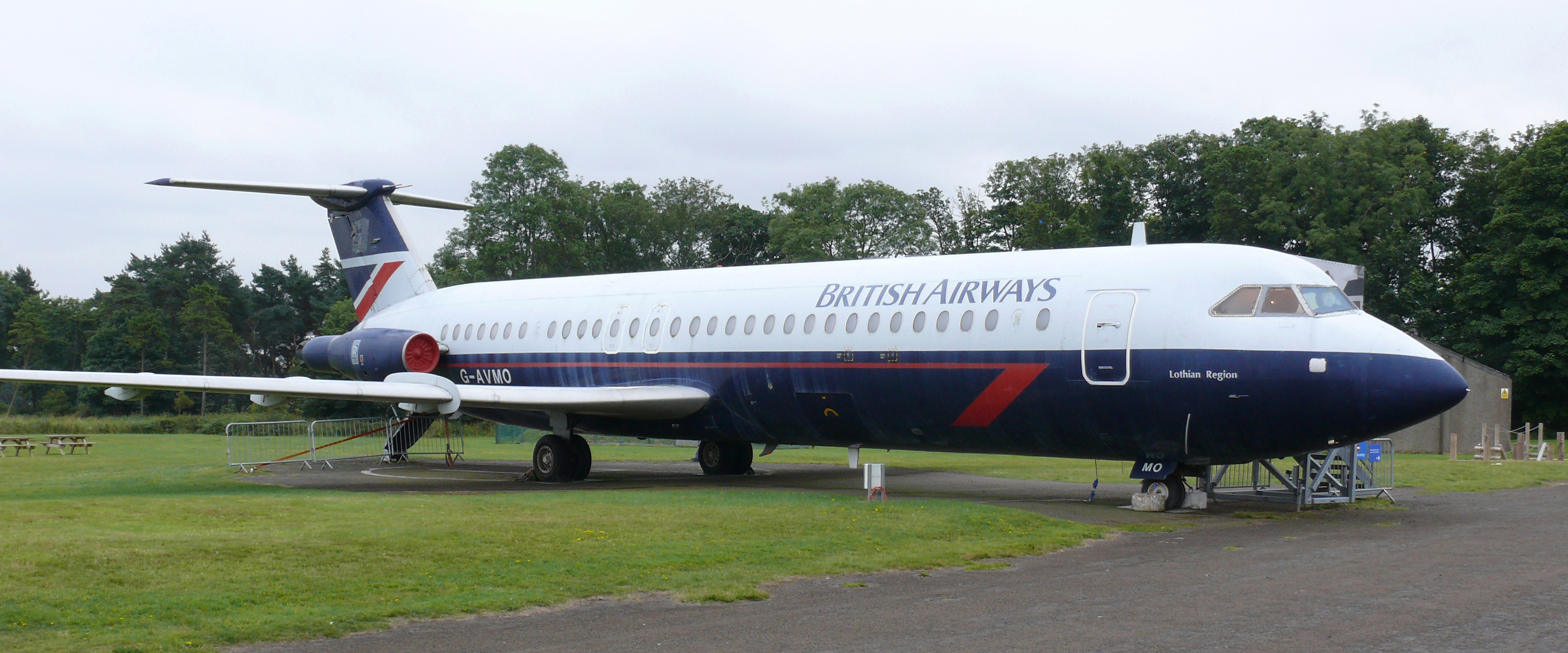
One-Eleven 510ED G-AVMO at the National Museum of Flight, East Fortune, Scotland, United Kingdom. Partially scrapped in March 2026.

- One-Eleven 475AM G-ASYD at the Brooklands Museum, Surrey, United Kingdom.
- One-Eleven 510ED G-AVMU at the Imperial War Museum Duxford, Cambridgeshire, United Kingdom.
- One-Eleven 510ED G-AVMO at the National Museum of Flight, East Fortune, Scotland, United Kingdom. Partially scrapped in March 2026, forward fuselage moved to Gatwick Aviation Museum.
- One-Elevens CC-CYL and CC-CYM at the Museo Nacional Aeronáutico y del Espacio in Santiago, Chile.
- One-Eleven LV-MRZ in San Justo Shopping, Buenos Aires, Argentina with DC-9 tail
- One-Eleven 510ED G-AVMN at the Panzemuseum East, Slagelse, Denmark. former AB Airlines.
- One-Eleven 515FB LV-OAX parked at Morón Airport, Buenos Aires, Argentina. This former Austral Líneas Aéreas aircraft is used for firefighting exercises and flew supply missions to Port Stanley during the Falklands War in 1982.
- One-Eleven 515FB LV-MZM parked at Morón Airport, Buenos Aires, Argentina, preserved as a ground instructional trainer for the Instituto Nacional de Aviación Civil (INAC).
- A former US Air BAC One-Eleven, registration N1117J, is located near Orlando International Airport, and is used for firefighting exercises. The aircraft is a mostly empty shell and is in poor condition. Now scrapped.
- A former MOD(PE) (later QinetiQ) BAC One-Eleven 539GL serial ZH763 is located at the Cornwall Aviation Heritage Centre in Newquay, Cornwall. On 25 November 2023 the fuselage was moved to the exterior of Solent Sky museum.
- Two Rombac One-Eleven 560 (YR-BRE and the last built, YR-BRI) are stored at Bucharest Henri Coandă International Airport. The two aircraft were classified in Romania's national cultural heritage (Patrimoniul cultural național al României) on 11 February 2021.
- BAC One-Eleven TZ-BSC owned by Romaero was restored and exhibited at the Bucharest International Air Show (BIAS) and Black Sea Defense & Aerospace (BSDA) 2018.
- A former Aero America BAC One-Eleven, registration N111RZ, is located at the premises of the Indian Hills Equestrian Centre, Illinois. The aircraft is missing its port side wing. Last flown by Rotec. Now scrapped.
- 215AU, registration SX-BAR, in colors of Hellenic Air (HA), was transferred from former Athens Airport to Lavrio
- A BAC One-Eleven Cockpit is on display and accessible at Malta Aviation Museum
- A complete BAC One-Eleven is on display in Topeka, KS at the American Flight Museum, tail number N789CF
- One-Eleven 510ED cockpit and forward fuselage G-AVMZ at the Shannon Aviation Museum, Shannon, Ireland.

== Specifications ==
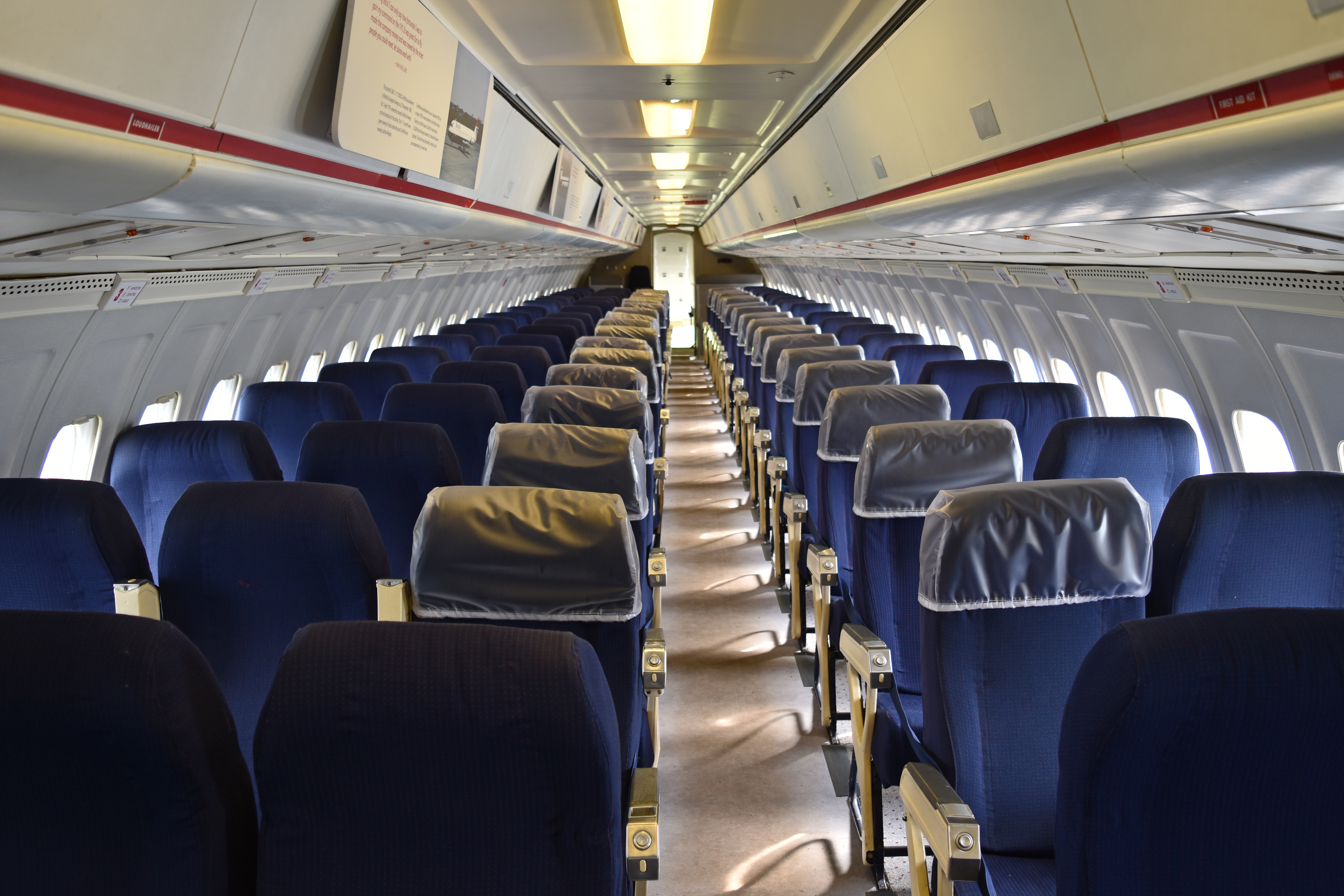
Five-abreast cabin, National Museum of Flight

Model	200	300/400	475	500
Cockpit crew	2			
Seating limit	89			119
Length	93 ft 6 in (28.50 m)			107 ft 0 in (32.61 m)
Wing Area	88 ft 6 in (26.97 m) span, 980 sq ft (91 m^{2}) area		93 ft 6 in (28.50 m) span, 1,031 sq ft (95.8 m^{2}) area	
Height	24 ft 6 in (7.47 m)			
Cabin Width	126 in (3.20 m)			
Cabin length	50 ft 0 in (15.24 m)		56 ft 10 in (17.32 m)	70 ft 4 in (21.44 m)
Empty weight	46,312 lb (21,007 kg)	48,722 lb (22,100 kg)	51,731 lb (23,465 kg)	54,582 lb (24,758 kg)
MTOW	78,500 lb (35,600 kg)	87,000 lb (39,000 kg)	98,500 lb (44,700 kg)	104,500 lb (47,400 kg)
Max. payload	17,688 lb (8,023 kg)	22,278 lb (10,105 kg)	21,269 lb (9,647 kg)	26,418 lb (11,983 kg)
Engines (x2)	Rolls-Royce Spey Mk 506	Mk 511	Mk 512-14DW	
Thrust (2x)	10,410 lbf (46.3 kN)	11,400 lbf (51 kN)	12,550 lbf (55.8 kN)	
Max. cruise	548 mph (476 kn; 882 km/h)		541 mph (470 kn; 871 km/h)	
Ceiling	35,000 ft (11,000 m)			
Climb rate	2,750 ft/min (14.0 m/s)	2,450 ft/min (12.4 m/s)	2,480 ft/min (12.6 m/s)	2,280 ft/min (11.6 m/s)
Takeoff (MTOW)	6,250 ft (1,900 m)	6,700 ft (2,000 m)	5,500 ft (1,700 m)	6,500 ft (2,000 m)
Range (Note: Typical payload, 2 hr reserve)	830 mi (720 nmi; 1,340 km)	1,270 mi (1,100 nmi; 2,040 km)	1,865 mi (1,621 nmi; 3,001 km)	1,705 mi (1,482 nmi; 2,744 km)

== See also ==
Related development

- BAC Two-Eleven and BAC Three-Eleven

Aircraft of comparable role, configuration, and era

- Boeing 737
- Dassault Mercure
- Fokker F28 Fellowship
- McDonnell Douglas DC-9
- Sud Aviation Caravelle
- Tupolev Tu-134
- Yakovlev Yak-42
