= Austral Líneas Aéreas =

Domestic airline of Argentina (1957–2020)

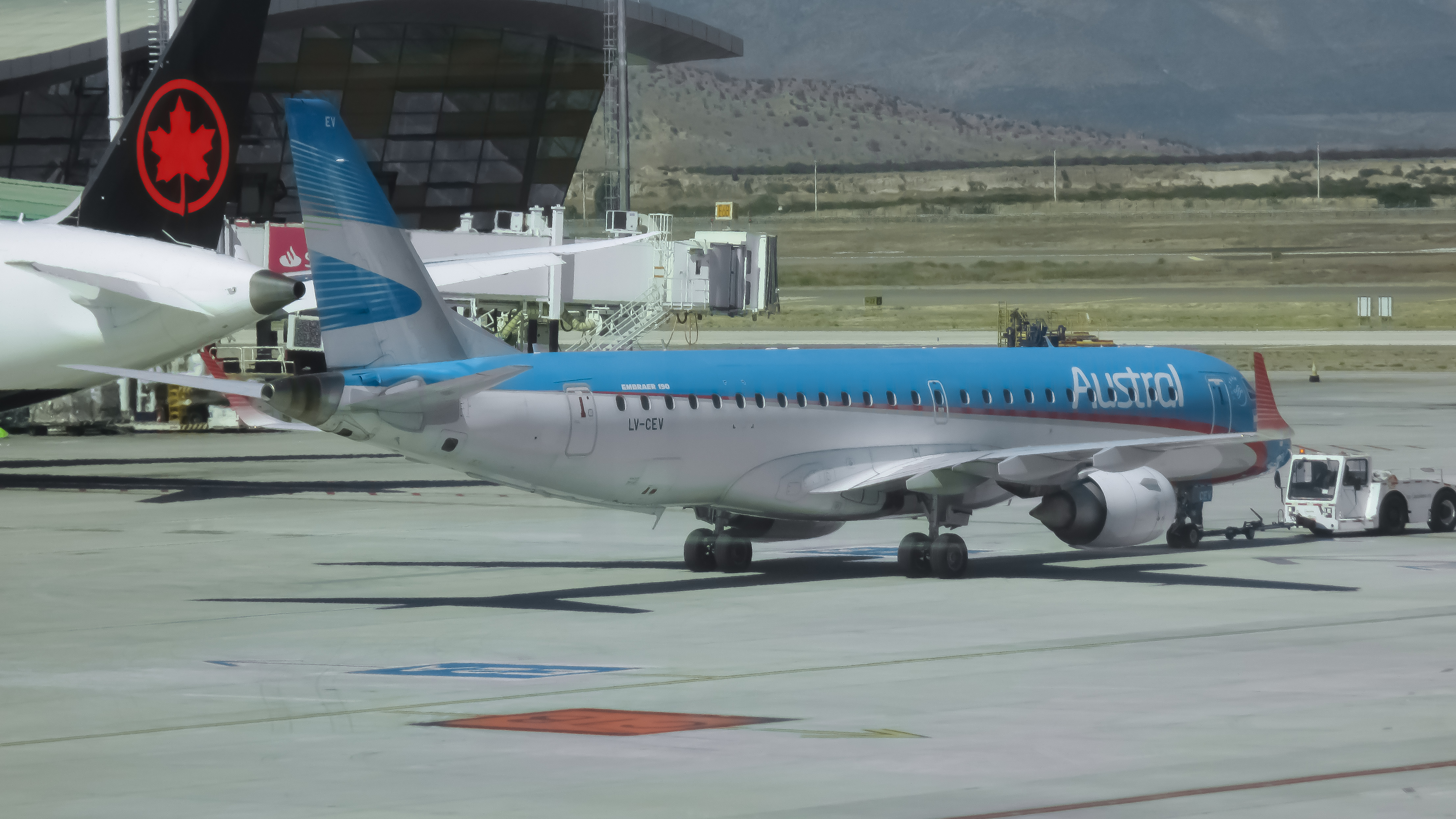
- Embraer 190
IATA	ICAO	Call sign
AU	AUT	AUSTRAL
- Founded: 1957 (as Compañía Austral de Transportes Aéreos)
- Commenced operations: January 1958
- Ceased operations: 30 November 2020 (merged into Aerolíneas Argentinas)
- Hubs: Aeroparque Jorge Newbery
- Frequent-flyer program: Aerolíneas Plus
- Alliance: SkyTeam (affiliate; 2012–2020)
- Subsidiaries: Inter Austral (currently defunct)
- Fleet size: 26
- Destinations: 22
- Parent company: Aerolíneas Argentinas (100%)
- Headquarters: Buenos Aires, Argentina
- Key people: Mario Dell'Acqua (President)
- Revenue: ▲US$ 428.31 million (FY 2017)
- Net income: ▼US$ –149.61 million (FY 2017)>
- Total assets: ▲US$ 494.61 million (FY 2017)
- Employees: 1,826

Cielos del Sur S.A., operating as Austral Líneas Aéreas, was a domestic airline of Argentina, the sister company of Aerolíneas Argentinas. It was the second-largest domestic scheduled airline in the country, after Aerolíneas Argentinas. As a subsidiary of Aerolíneas Argentinas, the company shared its headquarters with that airline, which is located in the Aeroparque Jorge Newbery of Buenos Aires, the main base of operations of the company.

Austral was fully integrated into Aerolíneas Argentinas; however, some differences arose, especially those relying upon the unions the staff of both companies were affiliated to, which led to constant conflicts. In May 2020, it was announced that Austral would merge with Aerolíneas, saving an estimated 100 million US Dollars and eliminating Austral as a brand. Austral ended operations on 30 November 2020.

As of October 2013, the airline operated an all-Embraer 190 fleet.

== History ==
The origins of the carrier trace back to 1957, when Compañía Austral de Transportes Aéreos SACI (CATASACI) was founded, starting scheduled services in January 1958. CATASACI focused its services on southwestern Argentina, but it also operated international flights to Montevideo, Puerto Montt and Punta Arenas. Aerotransportes Litoral Argentino (ALA) was a Rosario–based company that was founded in 1957 to operate flights between this city and Buenos Aires using Aero Commander equipment and operated flights within northern Argentina. In 1965, Pan Am acquired a 22% stake in ALA in return for supplying the company with DC-3s. A year later, CATASACI acquired a 30% holding in ALA and the services of both companies were integrated.

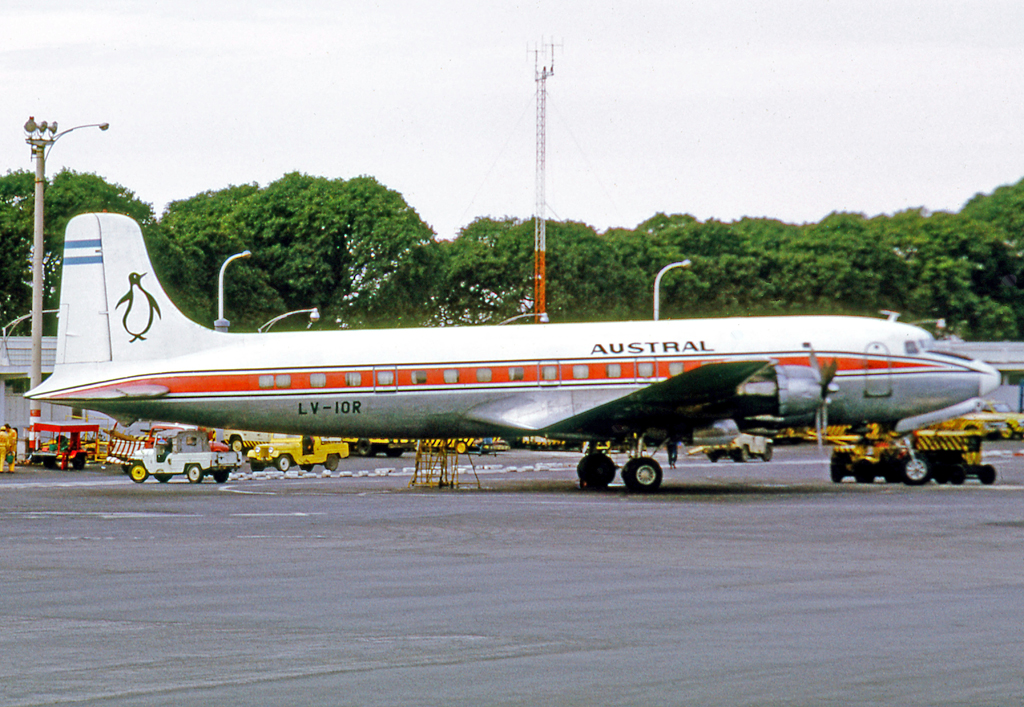
Douglas DC-6 at Buenos Aires-Aeroparque Jorge Newbery in 1972.

In May 1971, the ALA fleet consisted of two C-46s, five DC-3s, two DC-6Bs and five YS-11A-300s that served a domestic network including Buenos Aires, Corrientes, Formosa, Goya, Paraná, Paso de los Libres, Posadas, Resistencia, Rosario, Salta, Santa Fe and Tucumán, plus regional services to Antofagasta and Asunción, whereas CATASACI had a fleet that included seven BAC One-Elevens —four 400s and three 500s—, one C-46, one DC-6 and three YS-11s. Austral Líneas Aéreas was formally established in June that year from the merger of CATASACI and ALA. In practice, operations of the latter airline were absorbed by CATASACI, which was rebranded as Austral Líneas Aéreas S.A. after merging. Austral inherited both companies' fleet, consisting of turboprops NAMC YS-11 and jetliners BAC One-Eleven.

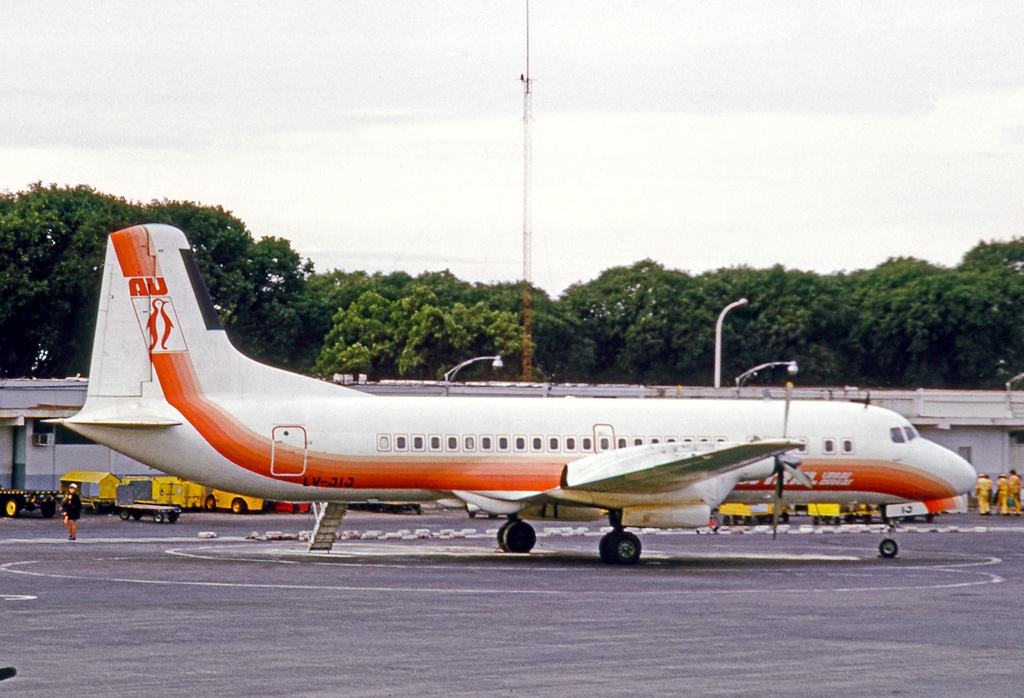
NAMC YS-11 at Buenos Aires-Aeroparque Jorge Newbery in 1972

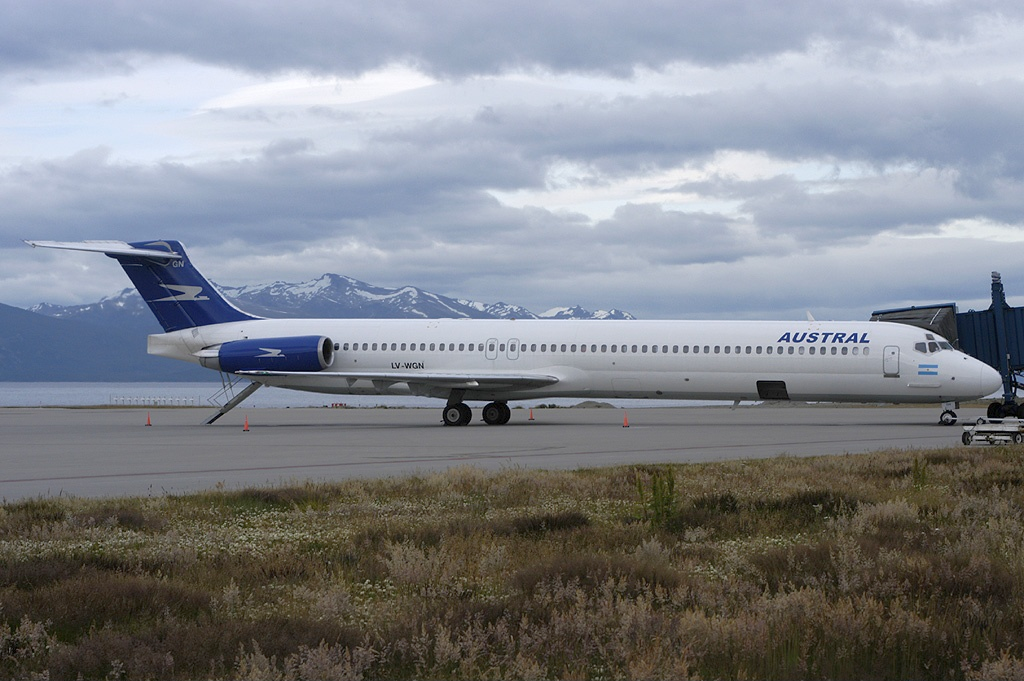
MD-83 in one of the former liveries at Malvinas Argentinas International Airport (2004)

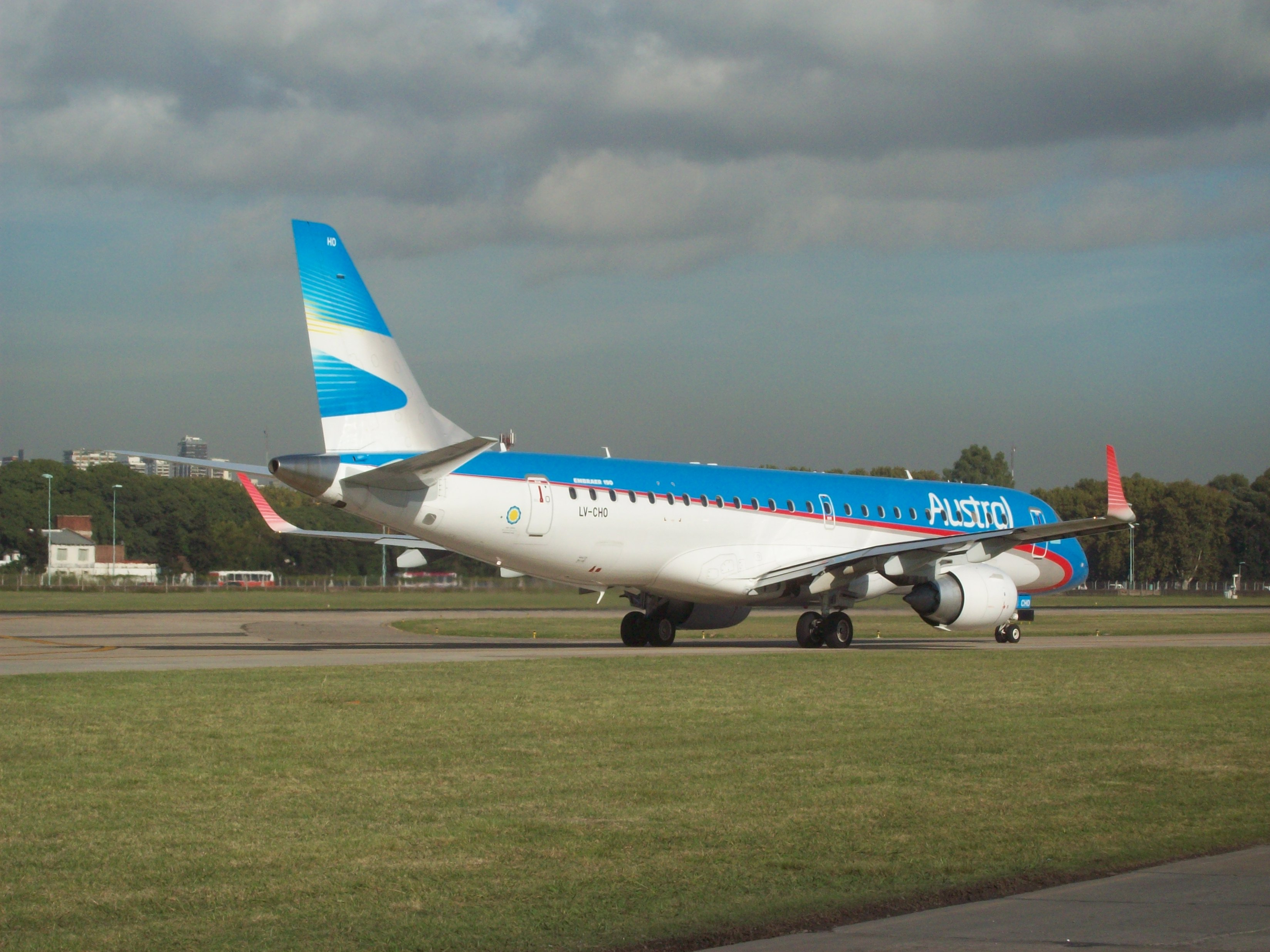
An Embraer 190 in the new livery taxiing at Buenos Aires-Aeroparque Jorge Newbery airport. (2011)

Austral became a government-owned company in 1980. After poor economic performances, there were two failed attempts to re-privatise Austral in 1981 and 1983. All that time Austral and Aerolíneas Argentinas were competitors on a number of domestic routes. Realizing that such a situation could not persist much longer, the government decided again to privatise Austral. This was much resisted by the Aerolíneas Argentinas' personnel, and more specifically its pilots, who claimed their salaries were lower than those of Austral's counterparts. Aerolíneas Argentinas' pilots union understood the government effort was not to solve their affiliates salary conflict, but to focus on privatising a loss-making carrier as Austral was instead. The consequence of this discrepance was the announcement that Aerolíneas Argentinas flights were to be indefinitely suspended by way of a strike, effective 1 July 1986. The strike affected both Aerolineas Argentinas' domestic and international operations. Argentine as well as foreign carriers were benefited from this strike. Ironically, Austral was included among those carriers, gaining the domestic market share Aerolíneas Argentinas lost.

Austral became once again a privately owned firm when it was acquired by the holding company Cielos del Sur S.A. in late 1987. The acquisition generated some controversy on the Argentine aviation sector at that time, as it was raised that the new owner had little or no experience in managing an airline. In April 1988, the carrier became an IATA member. Shortly afterwards, the company faced a major accident during its new private era on 12 June 1988, when a McDonnell Douglas MD-81 hit a tree on a low visibility approach into Posadas and crashed. Apart from the 22 fatalities involved in the accident, it also spread concerns on the aviation sector over the airline's poor rate of occupation on some routes, of just 10.32% for this particular flight.

Cielos del Sur S.A. and Iberia formed a consortium to acquire an 85% stake in Aerolíneas Argentinas in 1990, within the framework of that flag carrier privatisation. Soon afterwards, Cielos del Sur S.A. sold Austral to Iberia. The destiny of both Aerolíneas Argentinas and Austral became aligned thereafter. By July 1998, the company was 10% owned by its erstwhile competitor Aerolíneas Argentinas.

On 21 July 2008, the Argentine Government took the airline back into state control after acquiring 99.4% of the share capital for an undisclosed price. The remaining 0.6% continues to be owned by the company's employees. In September 2008, Argentina's Senate approved the nationalization of Aerolíneas Argentinas and its subsidiary Austral Líneas Aéreas on a 46–21 vote in favor of the takeover.

In June 2010, Aerolíneas Argentinas launched a new paint scheme to revamp the airline's image. The new livery resembles the colour blue of Argentina's flag and the colour yellow of the sun. As its subsidiary airline, Austral also adopted the new image. Austral's livery actually differs from the Aerolíneas Argentinas' one by a red cheatline only. In the meantime the airline also announced the incorporation of 20 new Embraer 190 to its fleet, receiving the first two of them in September 2010.

== Destinations ==
The Federal Corridor (Spanish: Corredor Federal), was a two-way route linking the cities of Bariloche, Buenos Aires, Córdoba, Iguazú, Mendoza and Salta. Although the corridor is commercially run by Aerolíneas Argentinas, the route is operated using Austral equipment.

== Fleet ==
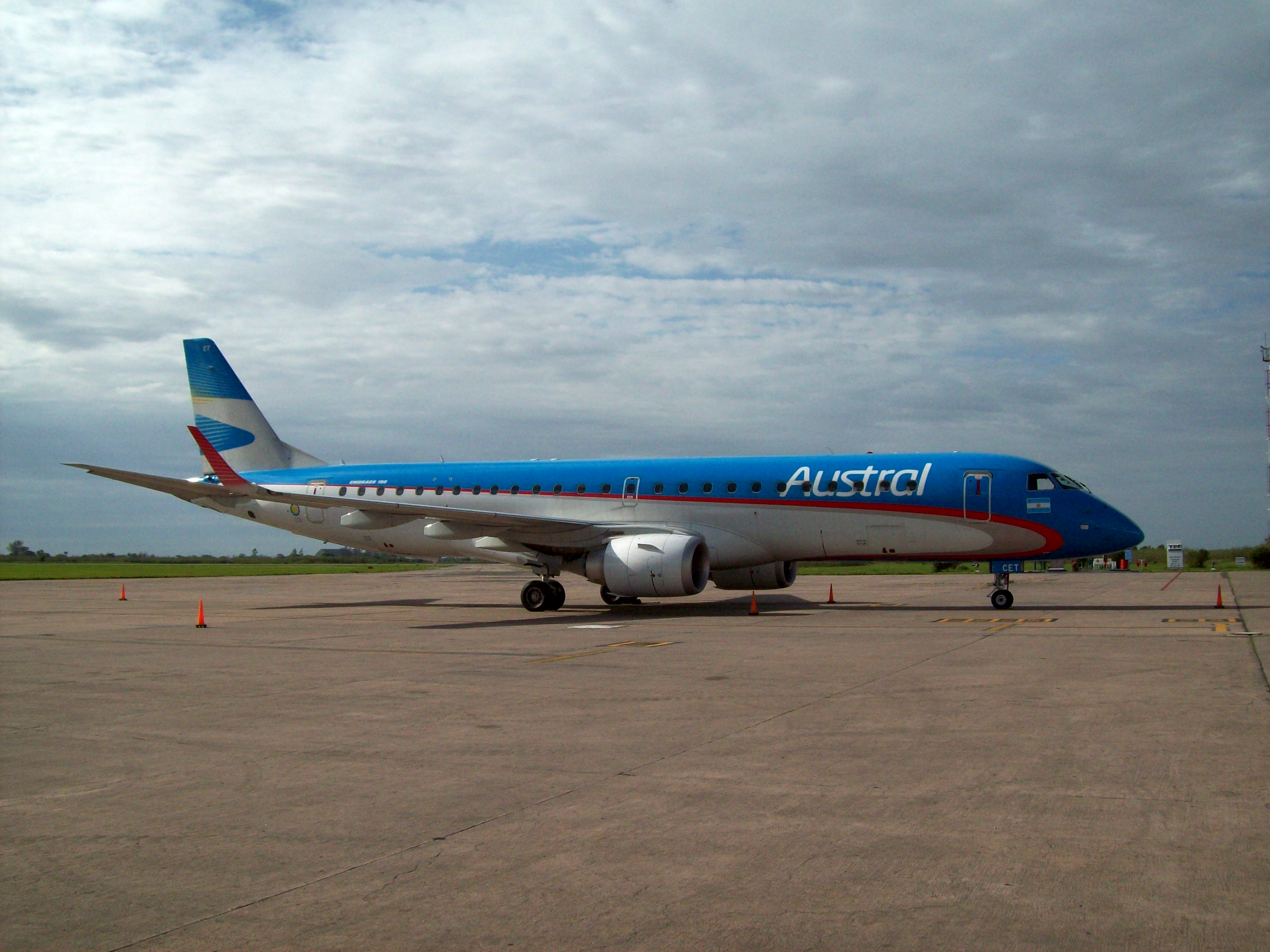
Embraer 190 on the apron of Benjamín Matienzo International Airport in 2012.

Austral Líneas Aéreas underwent a major fleet renewal. In 2009, the company signed a contract with Embraer for the purchase of 20 Embraer 190s, in a deal worth US$600 million that was 85% financed by BNDES. Two more E-190s were ordered in April 2013; the first of these two aircraft was incorporated into the fleet in September 2013.

The airline's fleet consisted of the following aircraft (as of August 2019):

Austral Líneas Aéreas Fleet
Aircraft	In Fleet	Orders	Passengers			Notes
Aircraft	In Fleet	Orders	J	Y	Total	Notes
Embraer 190	26	—	8	88	96	
Total	26	—				

=== Retired ===
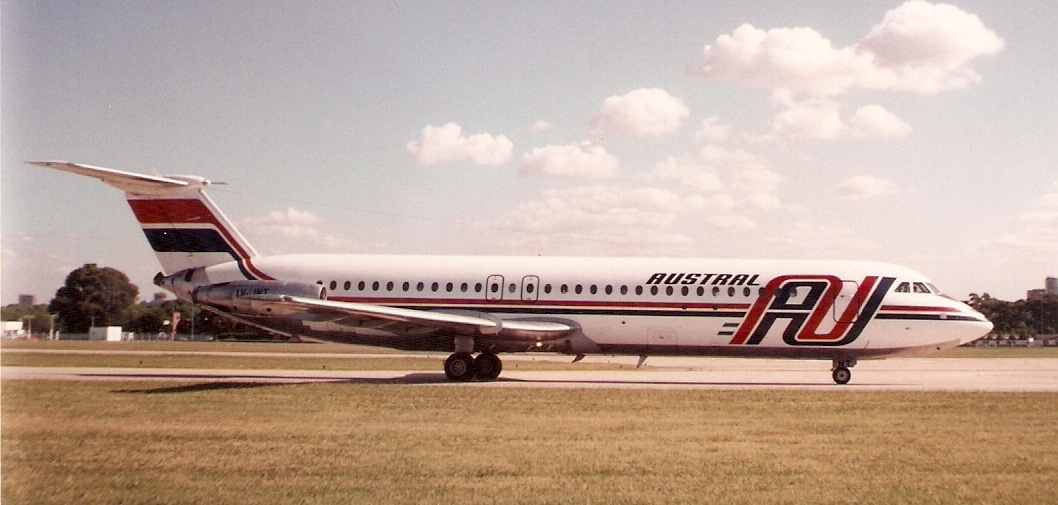
BAC 1-11 taxiing at Buenos Aires-Aeroparque Jorge Newbery airport in 1993.

Austral previously operated the following equipment:

- BAC One-Eleven 400
- BAC One-Eleven 500
- Boeing 737-200
- CASA CN-235 (operated for Inter Austral, a former Córdoba-based subsidiary of Austral)
- Curtiss C-46
- Douglas DC-4
- Douglas DC-6
- Douglas DC-6A
- Douglas DC-6B
- Fokker F27-100
- McDonnell Douglas DC-9-30
- McDonnell Douglas DC-9-50
- McDonnell Douglas MD-81
- McDonnell Douglas MD-82
- McDonnell Douglas MD-83
- McDonnell Douglas MD-88
- NAMC YS-11-100
- NAMC YS-11A-300

== Accidents and incidents ==
As of December 2011, Aviation Safety Network records 11 accidents/incidents for Austral Líneas Aéreas, totalling 224 deaths. The list below includes hull-loss accidents only.

Date	Location	Aircraft	Tail number	Aircraft damage	Fatalities	Description	Refs
16 January 1959	(Argentina) Mar del Plata	C-46 Commando	LV-GED	W/O	51/52	The aircraft was operating a domestic scheduled Buenos Aires–Mar del Plata passenger service as Flight 205. It crashed into the sea 1.2 kilometres (0.75 mi) off the coast after a missed approach to the airport of destination.	
17 December 1969	(Argentina) Buenos Aires	C-46 Commando	LV-GEB	W/O	0/2	One of the engines ran out of fuel at climbout after an improper selection of the fuel pump. The pilots managed to land the plane in a nearby sports field. The aircraft was operating a cargo service.	
4 December 1973	(Argentina) Bahía Blanca	BAC 1–11 500	LV-JNR	W/O	0/74	Experienced a loss of power in an engine immediately after takeoff from Comandante Espora Airport. The pilots made a forced landing using the remaining length of the runway. Arresting cables deployed on it were unable to stop the aircraft, and damaged the fuel tanks as they broke off. Despite sparks igniting the fuel, all occupants managed to escape unharmed from the aircraft.	
21 November 1977	(Argentina) Bariloche	BAC 1–11 400	LV-JGY	W/O	46/79	The airplane was operating a chartered Buenos Aires–San Carlos de Bariloche passenger service as Flight 9, when it suffered pressurization problems during climbout to 35,000 feet (11,000 m). It flew the route despite this, although at a lower flight level. On approach to San Carlos de Bariloche Airport the aircraft collided with the ground, 21 kilometres (13 mi) east of the destination city.	
7 May 1981	(Argentina) Buenos Aires	BAC 1–11 500	LV-LOX	W/O	31/31 (Note: A discrepancy exists regarding the death toll, as it was claimed it rose to 30, or to 31.)	The aircraft was operating a scheduled domestic Tucumán–Buenos Aires passenger service as Flight 901. Crashed into the Río de la Plata amid stormy weather while on approach to Aeroparque Jorge Newbery, 15 kilometres (9.3 mi) east-southeast of the airfield.	
12 June 1988	(Argentina) Posadas	MD-81	N1003G	W/O	22/22	Crashed on final approach to Posadas Airport after hitting trees in low visibility. Was operating a scheduled Resistencia–Posadas service as Flight 046.	
9 August 1995	(Argentina) Córdoba	CASA CN-235-200	LV-VHM	Minor	1/29	Rear door opened mid-flight, ejecting the flight attendant; the aircraft was operating a domestic route from Córdoba to Mendoza as Flight 2306 from Inter Austral - a subsidiary of the airline.	
10 October 1997	(Uruguay) Nuevo Berlín	DC-9-32	LV-WEG	W/O	74/74	Crashed while en route from Posadas to Buenos Aires operating Flight 2553 after entering a storm. The likely cause of the accident was the icing of the pitot tubes. It remains the deadliest one experienced by the carrier all through its history.	

== See also ==
- Aerolíneas Argentinas accidents and incidents
- List of BAC One-Eleven operators
- List of Embraer 190 operators
- List of NAMC YS-11 operators
- Transport in Argentina
