= Inter Austral Flight 2306 =

1995 aviation accident Argentina

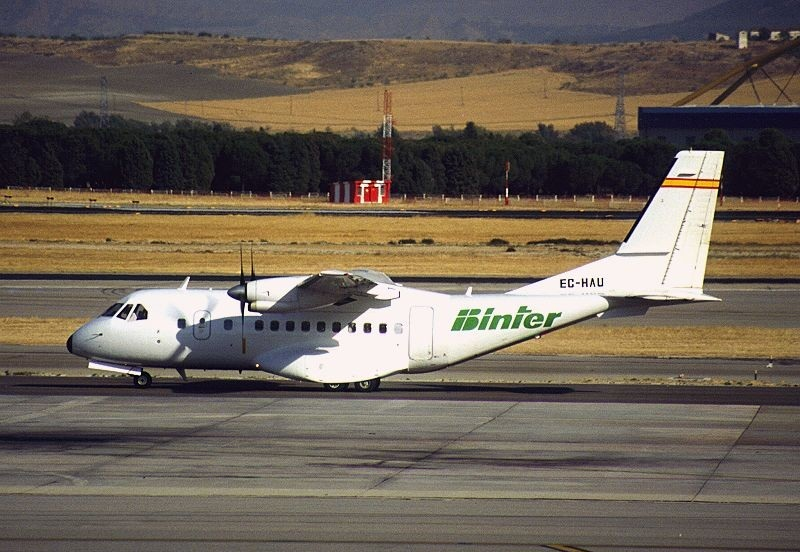
- A CASA CN-235 similar to the one involved

Accident
- Date: 9 August 1995
- Summary: Door opening mid-flight due to poor maintenance
- Site: Over the Sierras Grandes, Córdoba, Argentina

Aircraft
- Aircraft type: CASA CN-235-200
- Operator: Inter Austral
- Registration: LV-VHM
- Flight origin: Pajas Blancas, Córdoba, Argentina
- Destination: El Plumerillo International Airport, Mendoza, Argentina
- Occupants: 29
- Passengers: 26
- Crew: 3
- Fatalities: 1
- Survivors: 28

Inter Austral Flight 2306 was a domestic flight in Argentina from Córdoba to Mendoza. On 9 August 1995, the CASA CN-235-200 suffered from a rear door failure mid-flight, sucking out a flight attendant named Lilián Almada to her death, while the remaining occupants survived and the plane landed safely. Following the accident, Inter Austral ceased its operation in 1996 due to safety flaws.

== Accident ==
On the afternoon, the 20 year old CASA CN-235-200 took off from Córdoba. Sixteen minutes after takeoff, as soon as the plane reached 4,000 m (13,000 ft), a loud bang was heard, the rear door opened mid-flight. Lilián was preparing food for passenger when it happened, so she was ejected off the plane. A passenger in the last seat had not fastened his seatbelt yet, and he struggled to hold as it happened. The pilots were unaware of the situation as the door warning system did not activate, until a passenger banged the door. They decided to return to Córdoba. Passengers experienced strong forces and were stunned by the scenario, even after they landed.

Lilián's body was found two days after the accident. The autopsy revealed that she lost consciousness immediately after the ejection.

The flight crew admitted that the door-locking mechanism had been experiencing constant failures. The issues were only improvised by placing a cardboard on the edge or secure it with chains. At that flight, Lilián struggled to close the door.

== Lawsuit ==
In 2001, the Federal Oral Court of Córdoba executed a lawsuit following the accusation of "aggravated negligent homicide in an aircraft accident" toward Javier Losa de la Cruz, Ricardo Embón, Adolfo Luna, Jorge Belarmino Fernández and Alberto Muñoz. It is argued that the plane had malfunctioned 14 times between 14 May and 8 August.

However, only Adolfo Luna and Jorge Belarmino Fernández were sentenced to 2 year and 1 year 8 months in prison respectively.

The result caused dissatisfaction of the family members of Lilián Almada and the relatives of the victims in the crash of LAPA Flight 3142.
