= Philippine Airlines Flight 206 =

1987 aviation accident in the Philippines

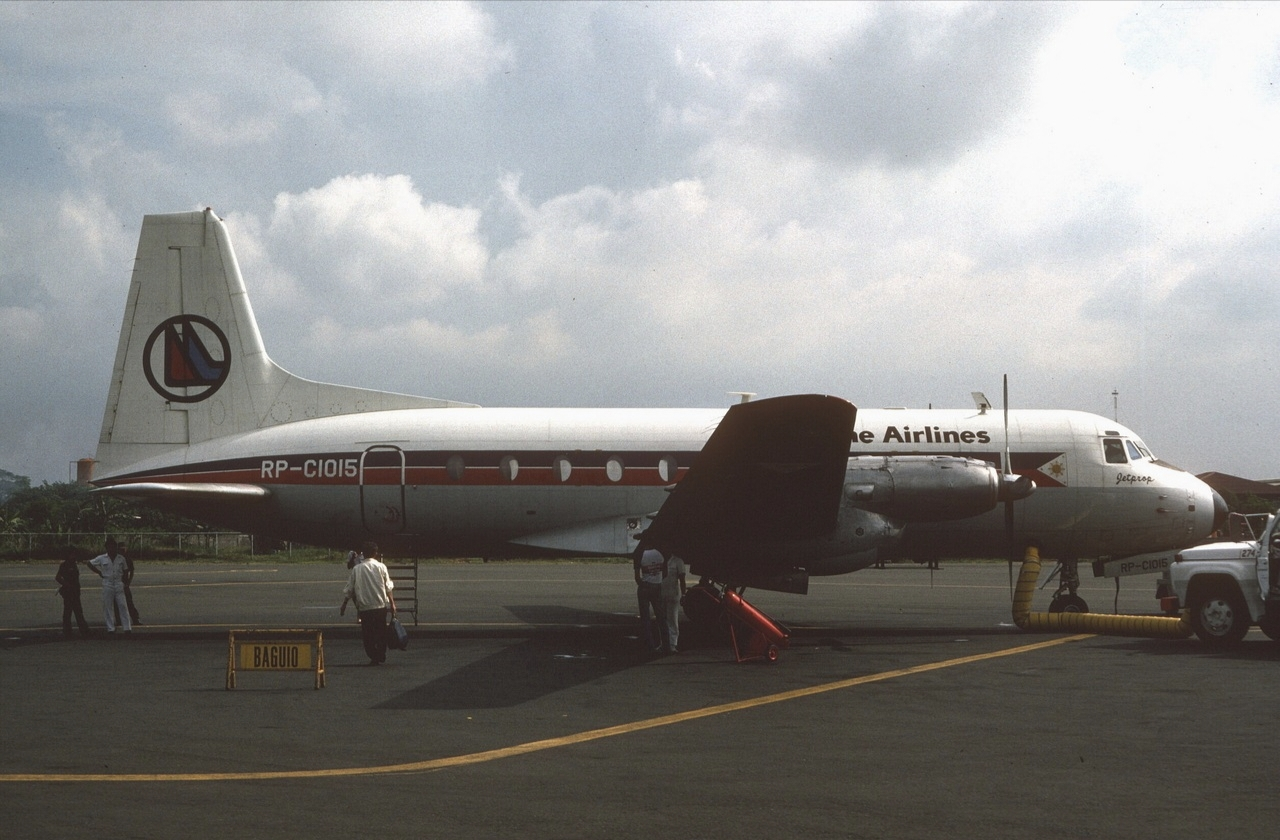
- RP-C1015, the aircraft involved in the accident, seen in 1986 with a previous livery

Accident
- Date: June 26, 1987
- Summary: Controlled flight into terrain due to bad weather
- Site: Mount Ugu, Benguet, Philippines; 16°19′9″N 120°48′6″E

Aircraft
- Aircraft type: Hawker Siddeley HS 748
- Operator: Philippine Airlines
- Registration: RP-C1015
- Flight origin: Manila Domestic Airport, Metro Manila, Philippines
- Destination: Loakan Airport, Baguio
- Passengers: 46
- Crew: 4
- Fatalities: 50
- Survivors: 0

Philippine Airlines Flight 206 was the route designator of a domestic flight from Manila Domestic Airport, Metro Manila, Philippines, to Loakan Airport, Baguio. On June 26, 1987, the Hawker Siddeley HS 748 crashed onto a mountain en route to Baguio, killing all 50 people on board.

== Accident ==
On the morning of June 26, 1987, Flight 206 departed the Manila Domestic Airport for Loakan Airport in Baguio, around 250 kilometers (160 mi; 130 nmi) north of Manila. It was scheduled to arrive at 11:10:00 Philippine Standard Time in Baguio, a city with an altitude of about 1,500 meters (4,900 ft). As the plane approached Baguio City, its pilot reported poor visibility. A monsoon was also reported in the area. Flight 206 disappeared from the radar screens around ten minutes before it was scheduled to land.

The wreckage of the plane was discovered five hours after it had gone missing. Flight 206 had crashed onto the fog-shrouded slopes of Mount Ugu, a 2,086-meter-high (6,844 ft) mountain located between Itogon, Benguet and Kayapa, Nueva Vizcaya. The crash site was located around 180 meters below the summit of Mount Ugu, and 15 kilometers south of Loakan Airport.

== Fatalities ==
There were no survivors among the 46 passengers and 4 crew members on the plane. Most of the fatalities were Filipinos, including Catholic Bishop Bienvenido Tudtud, Prelate of Marawi City, and Gloria Mapua-Lim, wife of then-Philippine Airlines executive vice-president Roberto Lim. At least one American citizen, John Neill who was then the Managing Director of Texas Instruments Philippines in Baguio, died in the crash.

The crash of Flight 206 was, at that time, dubbed as the second worst commercial aviation accident in Philippine history; however, the report of The New York Times proved to be inaccurate, as Philippine Airlines' previous accident in 1969 actually had fewer fatalities than Flight 206. The death toll has since been superseded by the crash of Cebu Pacific Air Flight 387 in 1998, which was surpassed two years later by Air Philippines Flight 541. The crash of Flight 206 remained the third-deadliest accident on Philippine soil until 2021, when a Lockheed C-130 Hercules of the Philippine Air Force crashed in Patikul, Sulu claiming 53 lives.

President Corazon Aquino and the airline's board of directors gave condolences to the victims of the Flight 206 and their respective families.
