= Austral Líneas Aéreas Flight 9 =

1977 aviation accident

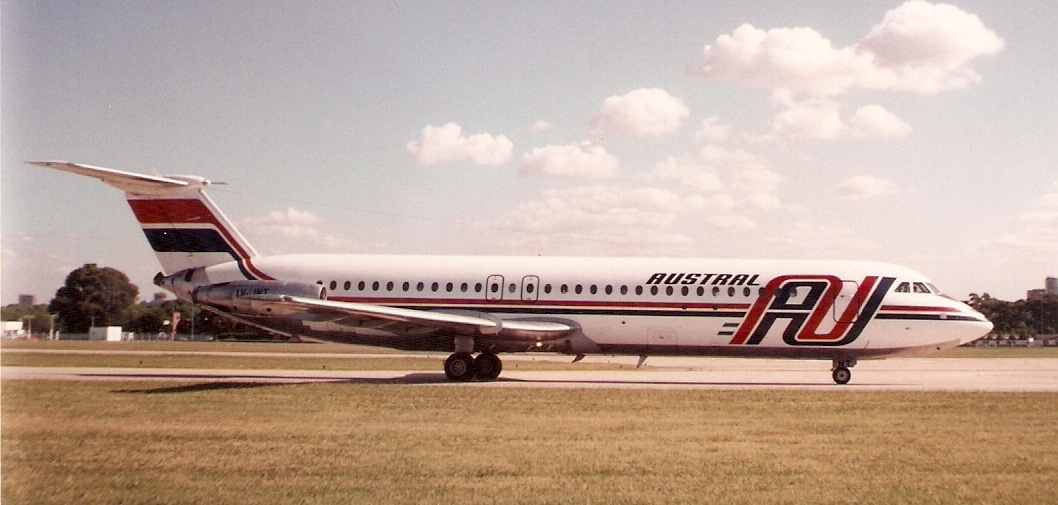
- An Austral Líneas Aéreas BAC One-Eleven similar to the one involved

Accident
- Date: November 21, 1977
- Summary: Controlled flight into terrain due to pilot error
- Site: Cerro Pichileufú, Argentina

Aircraft
- Aircraft type: BAC One-Eleven 420EL
- Operator: Austral Líneas Aéreas
- Registration: LV-JGY
- Flight origin: Aeroparque Jorge Newbery, Buenos Aires
- Destination: San Carlos de Bariloche Airport, Bariloche, Río Negro Province
- Occupants: 79
- Passengers: 74
- Crew: 5
- Fatalities: 46
- Injuries: 33
- Survivors: 33

On November 21, 1977, Austral Líneas Aéreas Flight 9 crashed near Bariloche, Argentina, killing 46 of the 79 people on board.

== Accident ==
Three aircraft had been chartered to carry 31 newlyweds to Bariloche for their honeymoon, with the accident aircraft being the second to depart. While climbing to 35,000 feet (11,000 m), the aircraft experienced pressurization problems and had to descend to 29,000 feet (8,800 m). At 00:40, the flight was cleared for an Instrument Landing System (ILS) approach to runway 28, but abandoned the approach due to a VOR receiver problem. the pilot then requested a visual approach to runway 10, but then decided to do another approach to runway 28 using another ILS procedure. The pilot then reported that the aircraft was near the VOR beacon. This was the last transmission from Flight 9. The aircraft then crashed into a mountain killing all five crew members and 41 passengers.

== Investigation ==
Investigators determined that the flight crew descended prematurely and did not follow allowed the ILS procedure, possible due to the VOR signal malfunctions, and the captain's mental state.
