= Austral Líneas Aéreas Flight 901 =

1981 aviation accident in Argentina

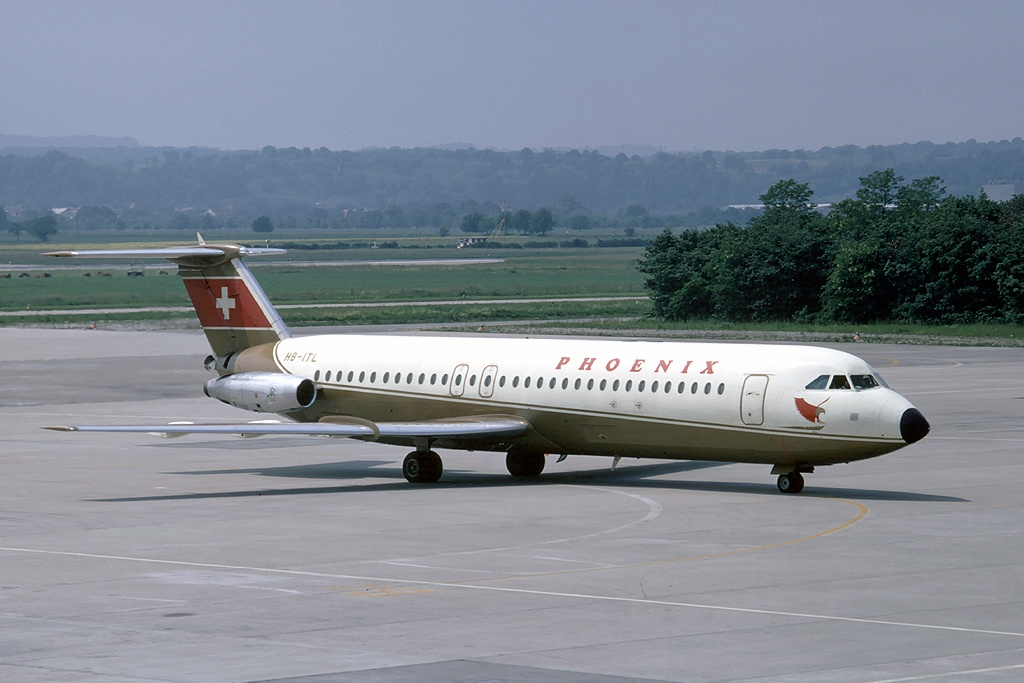
- The BAC One-Eleven aircraft involved in the accident, while still in service with Phoenix Airways

Accident
- Date: May 7, 1981
- Summary: Bad weather leading to pilot error
- Site: Near Aeroparque Jorge Newbery, Buenos Aires, Argentina; 34°37′52″S 58°16′23″W

Aircraft
- Aircraft type: BAC One-Eleven 529FR
- Operator: Austral Líneas Aéreas
- Registration: LV-LOX
- Flight origin: Teniente General Benjamín Matienzo International Airport
- Destination: Buenos Aires Aeroparque Jorge Newbery
- Occupants: 31
- Passengers: 26
- Crew: 5
- Fatalities: 31
- Survivors: 0

Austral Líneas Aéreas Flight 901 was a scheduled passenger flight from Teniente General Benjamín Matienzo International Airport to Buenos Aires Aeroparque Jorge Newbery, the aircraft crashed in a river near Buenos Aires, Argentina on May 7, 1981, after flying into a thunderstorm. All 31 people on board in the BAC-1-11 were killed in the crash.

== Accident sequence ==
Flight 901 had departed from Teniente Benjamín Matienzo International Airport in Tucumán at 9:11 a.m. on 7 May 1981, bound for Buenos Aires Aeroparque Jorge Newbery. The flight was uneventful until final approach.

The weather conditions in Buenos Aires were awful, with heavy rain and winds. At 10:42, Flight 901 was cleared to land on runway 13 of Aeroparque Jorge Newbery. Shortly before 11 a.m., the pilots made an approach intending to land, but due to the rain and wind they could not see the runway and decided to abort the landing. They then conducted a go-around and started a second approach.

At the suggestion of the air traffic controller, they headed south to wait over the city of Quilmes, believing that the weather would be calmer there and that the storm would cease quickly. However, when they got closer they noticed that there were cumulonimbus clouds, so the pilot informed the control tower of Aeroparque that they would turn toward the river to return to Buenos Aires, where they would try a different approach. After receiving authorization from the controller to fly at 600 metres (2,000 ft) high, the plane turned northward, straight into the center of the storm. From that point onwards, the Aeroparque control tower was unable to contact the crew again.

Shortly after, the crew lost control of the plane, and it crashed into a river. All 26 passengers and 5 crew on board were killed in the BAC 1-11.

After losing contact with Flight 901, ships from the Prefectura Naval Argentina and the Argentine Navy began to search for the plane. At 2:40 p.m., more than three hours after the crash, a Prefectura helicopter was the first to sight the aircraft's wreckage. Rescuers headed there, hoping to find survivors, but their efforts were futile. The search and recovery of bodies took several days.

== Investigation ==
The Civil Aviation Accident Investigation Board was in charge of the investigation. Only a little more than half of the plane's wreckage was removed from the water. The flight data recorder (FDR) and cockpit voice recorder (CVR), although intensively searched for 42 days, were never found. Due to the lack of the black boxes, the JIAAC investigation could not determine with certainty the cause of the accident, although it concluded as probable cause the "loss of control of the aircraft and impact against the water due to an error of appreciation of the pilot when evaluating the meteorological conditions when crossing through the zone of influence of a cumulonimbus of extremely violent activity".

== See also ==
- Communication Protocol between Tower and Flight 901
