= Santa Barbara Airport (disambiguation) =

Santa Barbara Municipal Airport is a commercial airport in Santa Barbara, California, United States (IATA: SBA).

Santa Barbara Airport may also refer to:

- Iloilo International Airport near Santa Barbara, Iloilo, Philippines (IATA: ILO, ICAO: RPVI)
- Santa Bárbara Airport (Chile) near Romerol, Chile (ICAO: SCRO)
- Santa Bárbara Airport (Honduras), a defunct airport that served Santa Bárbara, Honduras (ICAO: MHSB)
- Miguel Urdaneta Fernández Airport in Santa Barbara del Zulia, Venezuela
