= Cosmelli =

Cosmelli may refer to

- Massimo Cosmelli (born 1943), Italian basketball player
- Meseta Cosmelli Airport in Chile
