= Lago Brown Airport =

- IATA: none; ICAO: SCBR

Summary
- Airport type: Public
- Serves: Lago Brown (es), Chile
- Elevation AMSL: 540 ft / 165 m
- Coordinates: 47°23′19″S 72°19′35″W

Map
- Location of Lago Brown Airport in Chile

Runways
Direction	Length		Surface
Direction	m	ft	Surface
07/25	950	3,117	Grass
- Source: Landings.com

Lago Brown Airport (ICAO: SCBR) is an airstrip at the western end of Lago Brown (es), a mountain lake in the Aysén Region of Chile that runs along the border with Argentina.

The unmarked runway is on alluvial ground at the base of a mountain wall. The mountain is adjacent to the north, with open valley to the south. The valley narrows to the west, and the lake is to the east.

Published airstrip elevation differs from the Google Earth digital elevation model, which has the elevation much higher, at 1,733 feet (528 m) midfield.

== See also ==
- Transport in Chile
- List of airports in Chile
