= Los Condores Airport =

- IATA: none; ICAO: SCCD

Summary
- Airport type: Defunct
- Serves: Iquique, Chile
- Elevation AMSL: 1,706 ft / 520 m
- Coordinates: 20°15′20″S 70°5′21″W

Map
- Location of Los Condores Airport in Chile

Runways
| Direction | Length | | Surface |
| Direction | ft | m | Surface |
|---|---|---|---|
Closed
- Source: Google Maps

Los Condores Airport (ICAO: SCCD) was a military airport near Iquique, a Pacific coastal city in the Tarapacá Region of Chile.

Google Earth Historical Imagery (6/12/2004) shows a 914 metres (2,999 ft) runway with a 240-metre compound wall bordering it midfield. Successive imagery show a deteriorating pavement with more walls and power lines along its length.

== See also ==
- Transport in Chile
- List of airports in Chile
