= Pedro Villarroel C. Airport =

- IATA: none; ICAO: SCCB

Summary
- Airport type: Public
- Serves: Combarbalá, Chile
- Elevation AMSL: 3,002 ft / 915 m
- Coordinates: 31°13′15″S 71°04′15″W

Map
- Location of Pedro Villarroel C. Airport in Chile

Runways
Direction	Length		Surface
Direction	m	ft	Surface
01/19	899	2,949	Grass
- Source: Landings.com Google Maps GCM

Pedro Villarroel C. Airport (Spanish: Aeropuerto Pedro Villarroel C., (ICAO: SCCB) is an airstrip 8 kilometres (5.0 mi) southwest of Combarbalá, a small town in the Coquimbo Region of Chile.

There is mountainous terrain in all quadrants.

== See also ==
- Transport in Chile
- List of airports in Chile
