= Entrada Baker Airport =

Airstrip in Cochrane, Chile

- IATA: none; ICAO: SCEB

Summary
- Airport type: Public
- Serves: Cochrane, Chile
- Elevation AMSL: 1,640 ft / 500 m
- Coordinates: 47°10′00″S 71°59′33″W

Map
- Location of Entrada Baker Airport in Chile

Runways
Direction	Length		Surface
Direction	m	ft	Surface
13/31	700	2,297	Gravel
- Source: Landings.com Google Maps GCM

Entrada Baker Airport Spanish: Aeropuerto Entrada Baker, (ICAO: SCEB) is an airstrip 45 kilometres (28 mi) east of Cochrane, in the Aysén Region of Chile.

The airstrip is in a mountain valley 5 kilometres (3.1 mi) from the Argentina border. There is mountainous terrain in all quadrants.

== See also ==
- Transport in Chile
- List of airports in Chile
