= Freirina Airport =

- IATA: none; ICAO: SCFF

Summary
- Airport type: Public
- Serves: Freirina
- Elevation AMSL: 738 ft / 225 m
- Coordinates: 28°31′35″S 71°03′47″W

Map
- Location of Freirina Airport in Chile

Runways
Direction	Length		Surface
Direction	m	ft	Surface
12/30	735	2,411	Gravel
- Source: Landings.com Google Maps GCM

Freirina Airport Spanish: Aeropuerto Freirina, (ICAO: SCFF) is an airport serving Freirina, a river town in the Atacama Region of Chile.

Freirina is in the valley of the Huasco River, 14 kilometres (8.7 mi) inland from the Pacific coast. The airport is on a bluff above the river, 2 kilometres (1.2 mi) southeast of the town. There is distant high terrain in all quadrants.

== See also ==
- Transport in Chile
- List of airports in Chile
