= Angol Los Confines Airport =

Los Confines Airport
- IATA: none; ICAO: SCGO

Summary
- Airport type: Public
- Serves: Angol, Chile
- Elevation AMSL: 240 ft / 73 m
- Coordinates: 37°47′35″S 72°41′15″W

Map
- Location of Los Confines Airport in Chile

Runways
| Direction | Length | | Surface |
| Direction | m | ft | Surface |
|---|---|---|---|
| 18/36 | 800 | 2,625 | Asphalt |
| 18L/36R | 500 | 1,640 | Grass |
- Source: Landings.com Google Maps GCM

Los Confines Airport (Spanish: Aeropuerto Los Confines, (ICAO: SCGO)) is an airport serving Angol, a city in the Araucanía Region of Chile. The airport is just northeast of the city.

There is rising terrain west through north of the airport. Runway 18 has a 150 metres (490 ft) displaced threshold. The unpaved runway 18L has 175 metres (574 ft) of grass overrun.

The Los Angeles VOR (Ident: MAD) is located 26.4 nautical miles (48.9 km) north-northeast of the airport.

== See also ==
- Transport in Chile
- List of airports in Chile
