= Verfrut Sur Airport =

- IATA: none; ICAO: SCUT

Summary
- Airport type: Defunct
- Serves: Longavi, Chile
- Elevation AMSL: 1,132 ft / 345 m
- Coordinates: 36°12′45″S 71°32′40″W

Map
- Location of Verfrut Sur Airport in Chile

Runways
Direction	Length		Surface
Direction	ft	m	Surface
Closed
- Source: Google Maps

Verfrut Sur Airport (Spanish: Aeropuerto de Verfrut Sur, (ICAO: SCUT)) was an airport serving the Verfrut, S.A. fruit orchards near Longavi, Maule, Chile.

The runway is currently used for material storage. Google Earth Historical Imagery shows numbers of storage containers increasing from (10/30/2006). Runway markings were removed sometime after (4/28/2007).

== See also ==
- Transport in Chile
- List of airports in Chile
