= Cacique Blanco Airport =

Cacique Blanco Airport Aeropuerto Cacique Blanco
- IATA: none; ICAO: SCBC

Summary
- Airport type: Public
- Serves: Lago Verde
- Location: Chile
- Elevation AMSL: 750 ft / 229 m
- Coordinates: 44°13′47.9″S 071°51′9.8″W

Map
- Location of Cacique Blanco Airport in Chile

Runways
Direction	Length		Surface
Direction	ft	m	Surface
04/22	3,080	939	Grass
- Source: Landings.com

Cacique Blanco Airport (Spanish: Aeropuerto Cacique Blanco, ICAO: SCBC) is a public use airport located near Lago Verde, Aisén del General Carlos Ibañez del Campo, Chile.

== See also ==
- List of airports in Chile
