= La Laguna Airport =

- IATA: none; ICAO: SCLU

Summary
- Airport type: Private
- Serves: Marchigüe, Chile
- Elevation AMSL: 528 ft / 161 m
- Coordinates: 34°21′05″S 71°39′50″W

Map
- Location of La Laguna Airport in Chile

Runways
Direction	Length		Surface
Direction	m	ft	Surface
01/19	570	1,870	Grass
- Source: Landings.com Google Maps GCM

La Laguna Airport (Spanish: Aeropuerto La Laguna), (ICAO: SCLU) is an airstrip 6 kilometres (3.7 mi) northwest of Marchigüe, a town in the O'Higgins Region of Chile.

The runway has an additional 160 metres (520 ft) of unpaved overrun on the north end.

== See also ==
- Transport in Chile
- List of airports in Chile
