= La Aguada Airport =

- IATA: none; ICAO: SCLG

Summary
- Airport type: Public
- Serves: Pencahue, Chile
- Elevation AMSL: 75 m / 246 ft
- Coordinates: 35°21′02″S 71°47′00″W

Map
- Location of La Aguada Airport in Chile

Runways
Direction	Length		Surface
Direction	m	ft	Surface
04/22	750	2,461	Grass
- Source: Landings.com Google Maps GCM

La Aguada Airport (Spanish: Aeropuerto La Aguada), (ICAO: SCLG) is an airstrip five kilometres (3.1 mi) north of Pencahue, a town in the Maule Region of Chile.

== See also ==
- Transport in Chile
- List of airports in Chile
