= Las Araucarias Airport =

- IATA: none; ICAO: SCOC

Summary
- Airport type: Public
- Serves: Puerto Octay, Chile
- Elevation AMSL: 600 ft / 183 m
- Coordinates: 40°59′35″S 72°39′39″W

Map
- Location of Las Araucarias Airport in Chile

Runways
Direction	Length		Surface
Direction	m	ft	Surface
17/35	600	1,969	Grass
- Source: Landings.com Google Maps GCM

Las Araucarias Airport (Spanish: Aeropuerto de Las Araucarias, (ICAO: SCOC)) is an airport located 19 kilometres (12 mi) east of Puerto Octay, a town on the northern shore of Llanquihue Lake in the Los Lagos Region of Chile.

The runway has 220 metres (720 ft) of grass overrun available at the north end.

== See also ==
- Transport in Chile
- List of airports in Chile
