= Coposa Airport =

Airport in Chile

- IATA: CPP; ICAO: SCKP

Summary
- Airport type: Public
- Serves: Pica, Chile
- Elevation AMSL: 12,468 ft / 3,800 m
- Coordinates: 20°45′00″S 68°41′00″W

Map
- Location of Coposa Airport in Chile

Runways
Direction	Length		Surface
Direction	m	ft	Surface
17/35	3,200	10,499	Asphalt
- Source: Landings.com Google Maps GCM

Coposa Airport (IATA: CPP, ICAO: SCKP) is an extremely high elevation airport serving the Pica commune in the Tarapacá Region of Chile. The airport is 73 kilometres (45 mi) east-southeast of the town of Pica, and 13 kilometres (8.1 mi) west of the Bolivia border.

The Coposa non-directional beacon (Ident: NES) is located 0.6 nautical miles (1.1 km) off the approach threshold of Runway 35.

== See also ==
- Transport in Chile
- List of airports in Chile
