= Guadaba Airport =

- IATA: none; ICAO: SCGB

Summary
- Airport type: Private
- Serves: Los Sauces, Chile
- Elevation AMSL: 272 ft / 83 m
- Coordinates: 37°58′42″S 72°55′45″W

Map
- Location of Guadaba Airport in Chile

Runways
Direction	Length		Surface
Direction	m	ft	Surface
08/26	510	1,673	Grass
- Source: Landings.com Google Maps

Guadaba Airport Spanish: Aeropuerto Guadaba, (ICAO: SCGB) is an airstrip 8 kilometres (5.0 mi) west of Los Sauces, a town in the La Araucanía Region of Chile.

The runway has an additional 400 metres (1,300 ft) of unpaved overrun on the west end. There are nearby hills to the north and rising terrain to the west.

== See also ==
- Transport in Chile
- List of airports in Chile
