= Peulla Airport =

- IATA: none; ICAO: SCPU

Summary
- Airport type: Public
- Serves: Peulla (es), Chile
- Elevation AMSL: 710 ft / 216 m
- Coordinates: 41°03′26″S 72°00′50″W

Map
- Location of Peulla Airport in Chile

Runways
Direction	Length		Surface
Direction	m	ft	Surface
03/21	640	2,100	Grass
- Source: Landings.com Google Maps GCM

Peulla Airport (ICAO: SCPU) is an airport serving Peulla (es), a village near the shore of Todos los Santos Lake in the Los Lagos Region of Chile. The village is at the head of the fjord-like lake, where the Peulla River empties into it.

The airport is 3.5 kilometres (2.2 mi) upstream from the village. There is nearby steep mountainous terrain in all quadrants except along an approach from the lake.

== See also ==
- Transport in Chile
- List of airports in Chile
