= El Almendro Airport =

- IATA: none; ICAO: SCRT

Summary
- Airport type: Private
- Serves: Retiro, Chile
- Elevation AMSL: 486 ft / 148 m
- Coordinates: 35°57′35″S 71°47′33″W

Map
- Location of El Almendro Airport in Chile

Runways
Direction	Length		Surface
Direction	m	ft	Surface
18/36	1,095	3,593	Grass
- Source: Landings.com Google Maps GCM

El Almendro Airport (Spanish: Aeropuerto El Almendro), (ICAO: SCRT) is an airport 10 kilometres (6.2 mi) north-northwest of Retiro, a town in the Maule Region of Chile.

An open-ended culvert crosses beneath the runway 245 metres (804 ft) from the south end and might pose a hazard for aircraft departing the centerline. The runway width at that point is 20 metres (66 ft).

== See also ==
- Transport in Chile
- List of airports in Chile
