= Laguna San Raphael Airport =

Airport

- IATA: none; ICAO: SCRF

Summary
- Airport type: Public
- Serves: Laguna San Rafael National Park, Chile
- Elevation AMSL: 20 ft / 6 m
- Coordinates: 46°38′25″S 73°51′45″W

Map
- Location of Laguna San Raphael Airport in Chile

Runways
Direction	Length		Surface
Direction	m	ft	Surface
01/19	900	2,953	Asphalt
- Source: Landings.com Google Maps GCM

Laguna San Raphael Airport (ICAO: SCRF) is an airport serving Laguna San Rafael National Park in the Aysén Region of Chile. The runway is near the shore of San Rafael Lake.

== See also ==
- Transport in Chile
- List of airports in Chile
