= Agua Buena Airport =

Airport in Chile

- IATA: none; ICAO: SCKO

Summary
- Airport type: Private
- Serves: Collipulli, Chile
- Elevation AMSL: 1,420 ft (430 m)
- Coordinates: 37°59′38″S 72°15′00″W

Map
- Location of Agua Buena Airport in Chile

Runways
| Direction | Length | | Surface |
| Direction | m | ft | Surface |
|---|---|---|---|
| 01/19 | 600 | 1,969 | Grass |
- Source: Landings.com Google Maps GCM

Agua Buena Airport Spanish: Aeropuerto Agua Buena, (ICAO: SCKO) is a rural airstrip 16 kilometres (9.9 mi) east-southeast of Collipulli, a town in the Araucanía Region of Chile.

== See also ==
- Transport in Chile
- List of airports in Chile
