= Carolina Airport =

- IATA: none; ICAO: SCMY

Summary
- Airport type: Public
- Serves: Michilla (es), Chile
- Elevation AMSL: 128 ft / 39 m
- Coordinates: 22°42′15″S 70°16′50″W

Map
- Location of Carolina Airport in Chile

Runways
Direction	Length		Surface
Direction	m	ft	Surface
03/21	793	2,602	Dirt
- Source: Landings.com Google Maps

Carolina Airport (Spanish: Aeropuerto Carolina), (ICAO: SCMY) is an airport located 2 kilometres (1.2 mi) north of Michilla (es), a town in the Antofagasta Region of Chile. The airport is on the Pacific coast and serves the ore processing facility of the Michilla copper mine.

There is mountainous terrain to the east of the airport. South approach and departure are over the water.

== See also ==
- Transport in Chile
- List of airports in Chile
