= Callipulli Airport =

- IATA: none; ICAO: SCCP

Summary
- Airport type: Defunct
- Serves: Osorno
- Elevation AMSL: 377 ft / 115 m
- Coordinates: 40°37′11.0″S 72°50′46.9″W

Map
- Location of Callipulli Airport in Chile

Runways
Direction	Length		Surface
Direction	ft	m	Surface
Closed
- Source: Google Maps

Callipulli Airport (Spanish: Aeropuerto Callipulli), (ICAO: SCCP) was a rural airstrip 22 kilometres (14 mi) east of Osorno, a city in the Los Lagos Region of Chile.

Google Earth Historical Imagery shows the 900 metres (3,000 ft) grass airstrip was converted to cropland between (1/5/2003) and (12/27/2010).

== See also ==
- Transport in Chile
- List of airports in Chile
