= Entrada Mayer Airport =

- IATA: none; ICAO: SCEY

Summary
- Airport type: Public
- Serves: Entrada Mayer (es), Chile
- Elevation AMSL: 1,550 ft / 472 m
- Coordinates: 48°12′05″S 72°19′40″W

Map
- Location of Entrada Mayer Airport in Chile

Runways
Direction	Length		Surface
Direction	m	ft	Surface
11/29	715	2,346	Grass
- Source: Landings.com HERE Maps

Entrada Mayer Airport (ICAO: SCEY) is an airport near Entrada Mayer (es), a small frontier settlement in the Aysén Region of Chile.

The airport is in a mountainous region, less than 0.5 kilometres (0.3 mi) from the Argentina border. There is mountainous terrain in all quadrants except southeast, down the valley of the Mayer River into Argentina.

== See also ==
- Transport in Chile
- List of airports in Chile
