= Traiguén Airport =

- IATA: none; ICAO: SCTR

Summary
- Airport type: Public
- Serves: Traiguén, Chile
- Elevation AMSL: 812 ft / 247 m
- Coordinates: 38°16′15″S 72°39′42″W

Map
- Location of Traiguén Airport in Chile

Runways
| Direction | Length | | Surface |
| Direction | m | ft | Surface |
|---|---|---|---|
| 18/36 | 808 | 2,651 | Asphalt |
- Sources: Landings.com Google Maps GCM

Traiguén Airport (Spanish: Aeropuerto de Traiguén, (ICAO: SCTR)) is an airport serving Traiguén, a city in the La Araucanía Region of Chile. The runway is 2 kilometres (1.2 mi) south of the city.

== See also ==
- Transport in Chile
- List of airports in Chile
