= Municipal de Panguipulli Airport =

- IATA: none; ICAO: SCPG

Summary
- Airport type: Public
- Serves: Panguipulli, Chile
- Elevation AMSL: 940 ft / 287 m
- Coordinates: 39°39′20″S 72°21′32″W

Map
- Location of Municipal de Panguipulli Airport in Chile

Runways
Direction	Length		Surface
Direction	m	ft	Surface
02/20	652	2,139	Grass
- Source: Landings.com Google Maps GCM

Municipal de Panguipulli Airport (ICAO: SCPG) is an airport serving Panguipulli, a city in the Los Lagos Region of Chile.

The airport is 2 kilometres (1.2 mi) southwest of Panguipulli. The runway length does not include an additional 410 metres (1,350 ft) of grass overrun on the southern end.

== See also ==
- Transport in Chile
- List of airports in Chile
