= De la Independencia Airport =

Airport in Chile

De la Independencia Aerodrome
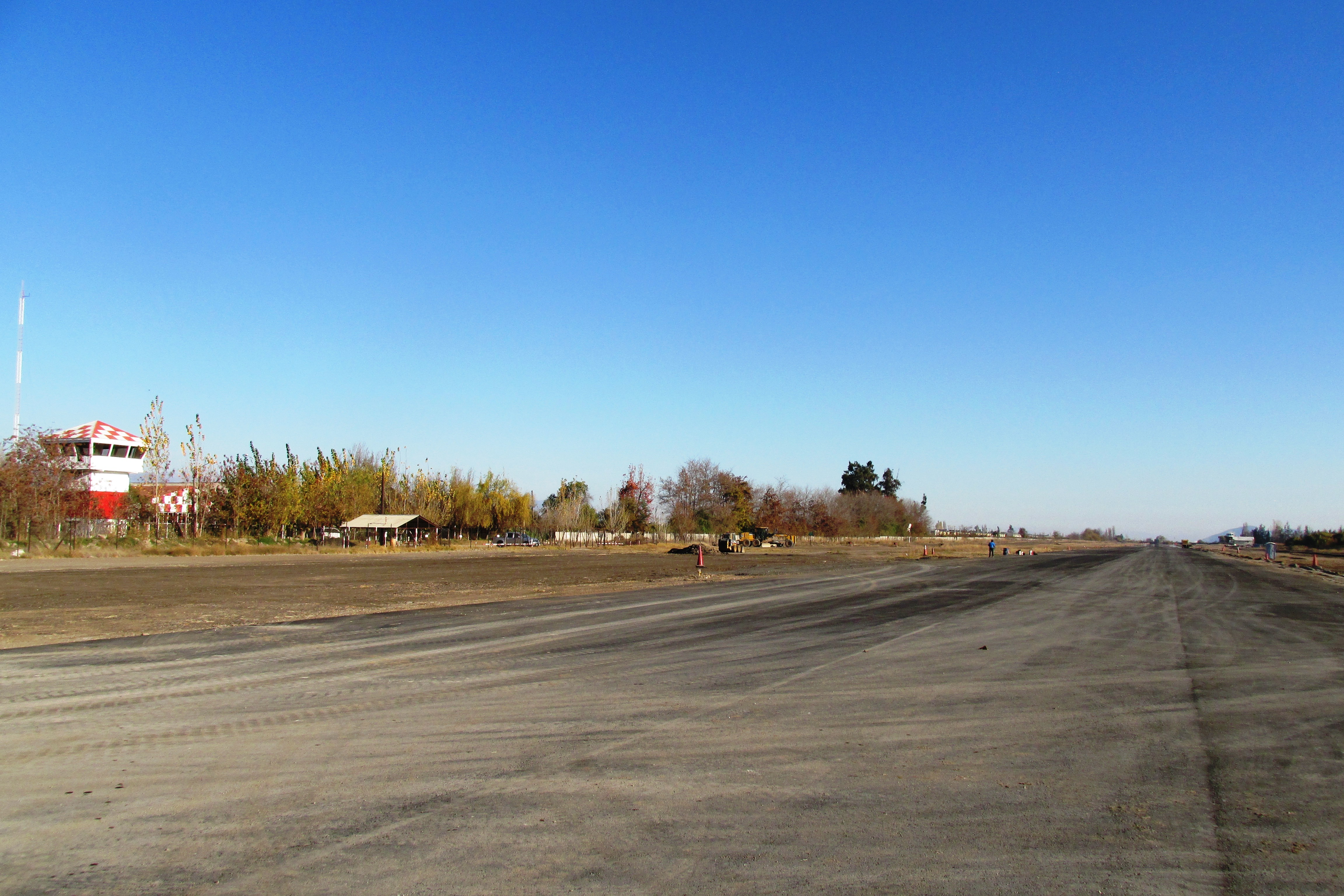
- IATA: none; ICAO: SCRG

Summary
- Airport type: Military/Public
- Serves: Rancagua, Chile
- Elevation AMSL: 1,597 ft / 487 m
- Coordinates: 34°10′25″S 70°46′35″W

Map
- Location of De la Independencia Aerodrome in Chile

Runways
Direction	Length		Surface
Direction	m	ft	Surface
03/21	1,600	5,249	Asphalt
- Source: Landings.com Google Maps GCM

De la Independencia Aerodrome (Spanish: Aeródromo de la Independencia, (ICAO: SCRG)) is an airport serving Rancagua, a city in the O'Higgins Region of Chile.

The airport is on the west side of the city. There is distant mountainous terrain east and west of the runway.

== See also ==
- Transport in Chile
- List of airports in Chile
