= Minsal Airport =

Minsal Airport Aeropuerto Minsal
- IATA: none; ICAO: SCSM

Summary
- Airport type: Public
- Serves: Salar de Atacama, Chile
- Elevation AMSL: 7,776 ft / 2,370 m
- Coordinates: 23°35′03″S 68°23′00″W

Map
- Location of Minsal Airport in Chile

Runways
Direction	Length		Surface
Direction	m	ft	Surface
09/27	2,800	9,186	Gravel
- Source: OurAirports Google Maps WAC

Minsal Airport (Spanish: Aeropuerto Minsal, (ICAO: SCSM)) is a high elevation airport serving the mineral salt mining operations on the Salar de Atacama salt flat, in the Antofagasta Region of Chile.

== See also ==
- Transport in Chile
- List of airports in Chile
