= Pichidangui Airport =

- IATA: none; ICAO: SCDI

Summary
- Airport type: Public
- Serves: Pichidangui, Chile
- Elevation AMSL: 98 ft / 30 m
- Coordinates: 32°8′47″S 71°30′30″W

Map
- Location of Pichidangui Airport in Chile

Runways
Direction	Length		Surface
Direction	m	ft	Surface
04/22	600	1,969	Asphalt
- Source: Landings.com Google Maps GCM

Pichidangui Airport (Spanish: Aeropuerto de Pichidangui), (ICAO: SCDI) is an airport 3 kilometres (2 mi) east-southeast of Pichidangui, a Pacific coastal town in the Coquimbo Region of Chile.

The airport is 2 kilometres (1.2 mi) inland from the Pacific shore. There are hills southeast of the runway.

== See also ==
- Transport in Chile
- List of airports in Chile
