= Uni Frutti Airport =

Uni Frutti Airport Teno Airport
- IATA: none; ICAO: none

Summary
- Airport type: Public
- Serves: Teno, Chile
- Elevation AMSL: 950 ft / 290 m
- Coordinates: 34°48′30″S 71°02′36″W

Map
- Location of Uni Frutti Airport in Chile

Runways
| Direction | Length | | Surface |
| Direction | m | ft | Surface |
|---|---|---|---|
| 04/22 | 800 | 2,625 | Grass |
- Source: Landings.com Google Maps

Uni Frutti Airport (Spanish: Aeropuerto Uni Frutti) is an airstrip 12 kilometres (7.5 mi) northeast of Teno, a town in the Maule Region of Chile.

Google Earth Historical Imagery (10/19/2004) shows a 1,015 metres (3,330 ft) grass strip marked to 850 metres. The 12/31/2012 image shows crop cultivation has cut the unmarked length to 810 metres.

== See also ==
- Transport in Chile
- List of airports in Chile
