= Olmué Airport =

Airport in Valparaíso Region, Chile

- IATA: none; ICAO: SCOM

Summary
- Airport type: Public
- Serves: Olmué, Chile
- Elevation AMSL: 396 ft / 121 m
- Coordinates: 32°59′50″S 71°10′20″W

Map
- Location of Olmué Airport in Chile

Runways
Direction	Length		Surface
Direction	m	ft	Surface
05/23	502	1,647	Grass
- Source: Landings.com Google Maps GCM

Olmué Airport (Spanish: Aeródromo de Olmué), (ICAO: SCOM) is an airport serving Olmué, a city in the Valparaíso Region of Chile.

There is nearby mountainous terrain northwest through east, and more distant mountainous terrain in other quadrants.

== See also ==
- Transport in Chile
- List of airports in Chile
