= Las Agullas Airport =

Airport in Chile

- IATA: none; ICAO: SCGL

Summary
- Airport type: Public
- Serves: Rapel Lake, Chile
- Elevation AMSL: 450 ft (140 m)
- Coordinates: 34°10′10″S 71°31′55″W

Map
- Location of Las Agullas Airport in Chile

Runways
Direction	Length		Surface
Direction	m	ft	Surface
01/19	820	2,690	Grass
- Source: Landings.com Google Maps GCM

Las Agullas Airport (Spanish: Aeropuerto Las Agullas), (ICAO: SCGL) is one of several airstrips serving communities on the western side of Rapel Lake in the O'Higgins Region of Chile. The runway is 4 kilometres (2.5 mi) west of the lake.

== See also ==
- Transport in Chile
- List of airports in Chile
