= Siberia Airport =

- IATA: none; ICAO: SCGS

Summary
- Airport type: Private
- Owner: Celulosa Arauco Y Constitución S.A.
- Serves: Cholguán (es), Chile
- Elevation AMSL: 722 ft / 220 m
- Coordinates: 37°10′25″S 72°03′55″W

Map
- Location of Siberia Airport in Chile

Runways
Direction	Length		Surface
Direction	m	ft	Surface
16/34	948	3,110	Grass
- Source: Landings.com Google Maps GCM

Siberia Airport Spanish: Aeropuerto Siberia, (ICAO: SCGS) is an airport serving the Arauco forest products plant at Cholguán (es), a town in the Bío Bío Region of Chile.

The runway has an additional 455 metres (1,493 ft) of unpaved overrun on the north end.

The Los Angeles VOR (Ident: MAD) is 21.5 nautical miles (39.8 km) southwest of the airport.

== See also ==
- Transport in Chile
- List of airports in Chile
