= San Vicente de Tagua Tagua Airport =

- IATA: none; ICAO: SCET

Summary
- Airport type: Closed
- Serves: San Vicente de Tagua Tagua
- Elevation AMSL: 748 ft / 228 m
- Coordinates: 34°28′29.6″S 71°0′50″W

Map
- Location of airport in Chile

Runways
Direction	Length		Surface
Direction	ft	m	Surface
Closed
- Source: GCM Google Maps

San Vicente de Tagua Tagua Airport (Spanish: Aeropuerto San Vicente de Tagua Tagua, (ICAO: SCET)) was an airstrip 8 kilometres (5 mi) east-southeast of San Vicente de Tagua Tagua, a city in the O'Higgins Region of Chile.

Google Earth Historical Imagery (2/22/2011) shows a 710 metres (2,330 ft) grass airstrip running through a cultivated field. The (10/8/2011) image shows the runway planted with crops. Current imagery shows no trace of the runway.

== See also ==
- Transport in Chile
- List of airports in Chile
