= Chañaral Airport =

- IATA: CNR; ICAO: SCRA

Summary
- Airport type: Public
- Serves: Chañaral, Chile
- Elevation AMSL: 97 ft / 30 m
- Coordinates: 26°19′55″S 70°36′25″W

Map
- Location of Chañaral Airport in Chile

Runways
Direction	Length		Surface
Direction	m	ft	Surface
09/27	1,225	4,019	Asphalt
- Source: Landings.com Google Maps GCM

Chañaral Airport Spanish: Aeropuerto de Chañaral, (IATA: CNR, ICAO: SCRA) is an airport serving Chañaral, a Pacific coastal city in the Atacama Region of Chile.

There is rising terrain north and south of the airport.

== See also ==
- Transport in Chile
- List of airports in Chile
