= Pirque Estero Seco Airport =

Estero Seco Airport
- IATA: none; ICAO: SCZE

Summary
- Airport type: Public
- Serves: Pirque, Chile
- Elevation AMSL: 2,461 ft / 750 m
- Coordinates: 33°44′45″S 70°32′57″W

Map
- Location of Estero Seco Airport in Chile

Runways
Direction	Length		Surface
Direction	m	ft	Surface
16/34	655	2,149	Grass
- Source: Landings.com Google Maps GCM

Estero Seco Airport (Spanish: Aeropuerto de Estero Seco), (ICAO: SCZE) is an airstrip in the Pirque commune of the Santiago Metropolitan Region in Chile.

There are hills east of the runway, and rising terrain south through northwest.

== See also ==
- Transport in Chile
- List of airports in Chile
