= Las Breas Airport =

Las Breas Airport Aeropuerto Las Breas
- IATA: TTC; ICAO: SCTT

Summary
- Airport type: Public
- Serves: Taltal, Chile
- Elevation AMSL: 2,580 ft / 786 m
- Coordinates: 25°33′50″S 70°22′33″W

Map
- Location of Las Breas Airport in Chile

Runways
Direction	Length		Surface
Direction	m	ft	Surface
15/33	1,230	4,035	Asphalt
- Source: Landings.com Google Maps GCM

Las Breas Airport (Spanish: Aeropuerto Las Breas, IATA: TTC, ICAO: SCTT) is an airport 20 kilometres (12 mi) south-southeast of Taltal, a Pacific coastal town in the Antofagasta Region of Chile.

There is a 215 metres (705 ft) unpaved overrun on the north end of the runway.

== See also ==
- Transport in Chile
- List of airports in Chile
