= Ollagüe Airport =

- IATA: none; ICAO: none

Summary
- Airport type: Public
- Serves: Ollagüe, Chile
- Elevation AMSL: 12,100 ft / 3,688 m
- Coordinates: 21°13′20″S 68°14′20″W

Map
- Location of Ollagüe Airport in Chile

Runways
Direction	Length		Surface
Direction	m	ft	Surface
10/28	1,585	5,200	Dirt
06/24	1,435	4,708	Dirt
- Source: Landings.com Google Maps

Ollagüe Airport (Spanish: Aeropuerto de Ollagüe, ) is an extremely high elevation airport in the Chilean altiplano. It is 1 kilometre (0.6 mi) east of Ollagüe, a railroad and industrial town in the Antofagasta Region of Chile. Ollagüe is 2.5 kilometres (1.6 mi) southwest of Chile's border with Bolivia.

== See also ==
- Transport in Chile
- List of airports in Chile
