= Domeyko Airfield =

Domeyko Airfield Aeródromo Domeyko
- IATA: none; ICAO: SCDK

Summary
- Airport type: Public
- Serves: Domeyko
- Location: Chile
- Coordinates: 28°58′3.2″S 070°55′22.7″W

Map
- Location of Domeyko Airfield in Chile

Runways
Direction	Length		Surface
Direction	ft	m	Surface
09/27	4,670	1,423	Dirt
- Source: Landings.com

Domeyko Airfield (Spanish: Aeródromo Domeyko, ICAO: SCDK) is a public use airport located near Domeyko, Atacama, Chile.

== See also ==
- List of airports in Chile
