= El Corte Airport =

El Corte Airport Aeropuerto El Corte
- IATA: none; ICAO: SCEG

Summary
- Airport type: Private
- Serves: Talagante, Chile
- Elevation AMSL: 1,024 ft / 312 m
- Coordinates: 33°42′35″S 70°54′55″W

Map
- Location of El Corte Airport in Chile

Runways
Direction	Length		Surface
Direction	m	ft	Surface
10/28	500	1,640	Gravel
- Source: Landings.com Google Maps GCM

El Corte Airport (Spanish: Aeropuerto El Corte), (ICAO: SCEG) is an airport 5 kilometres (3.1 mi) south-southeast of Talagante, a city in the Santiago Metropolitan Region of Chile.

The Talagante non-directional beacon (Ident: TAL) is located 1.9 nautical miles (3.5 km) northwest of the airport.

== See also ==
- Transport in Chile
- List of airports in Chile
