= Leones Airport =

- IATA: none; ICAO: SCLO

Summary
- Airport type: Private
- Serves: General Carrera Lake, Chile
- Elevation AMSL: 705 ft / 215 m
- Coordinates: 46°45′57″S 72°49′05″W

Map
- Location of Leones Airport in Chile

Runways
| Direction | Length | | Surface |
| Direction | m | ft | Surface |
|---|---|---|---|
| 14/32 | 600 | 1,969 | Grass |
- Source: SkyVector Google Maps

Leones Airport (ICAO: SCLO) is an airport on the northwest shore of General Carrera Lake in the Aysén Region of Chile. The nearest village is Puerto Guadal (es), 12 kilometres (7.5 mi) away on the other side of the lake.

There is mountainous terrain west of the runway.

== See also ==
- Transport in Chile
- List of airports in Chile
