= Los Cedros Airport =

Los Cedros Airport Aeropuerto Los Cedros
- IATA: none; ICAO: SCED

Summary
- Airport type: Public
- Serves: Sagrada Familia
- Elevation AMSL: 305 ft / 93 m
- Coordinates: 35°9′20″S 71°36′20″W

Map
- Location of Los Cedros Airport in Chile

Runways
Direction	Length		Surface
Direction	m	ft	Surface
08/26	850	2,789	Gravel
01/19	850	2,789	Gravel
- Sources: Landings.com Google Maps GCM

Los Cedros Airport (Spanish: Aeropuerto Los Cedros), (ICAO: SCED) is an airport located in an agricultural valley south of the Mataquito River in the Sagrada Familia commune of Chile's Maule Region. The nearest community is Villa Prat (es), 6 kilometres (3.7 mi) to the north.

== See also ==
- Transport in Chile
- List of airports in Chile
