= Chumildén Airport =

Airstrip in Chile

- IATA: none; ICAO: SCHD

Summary
- Airport type: Private
- Serves: Chumildén, Chile
- Elevation AMSL: 66 ft / 20 m
- Coordinates: 42°31′29″S 72°48′55″W

Map
- Location of Chumildén Airport in Chile

Runways
| Direction | Length | | Surface |
| Direction | m | ft | Surface |
|---|---|---|---|
| 02/20 | 500 | 1,640 | Grass |
- Source: Google Maps GCM

Chumildén Airport (Spanish: Aeródromo Chumildén) (ICAO: SCHD) is a coastal airstrip 44 kilometres (27 mi) north of Chaitén, a town in the Los Lagos Region of Chile.

The airstrip is on the Gulf of Ancud next to the settlement of Chumildén. Approach and departure for either end run along the shoreline.

== See also ==
- Transport in Chile
- List of airports in Chile
