= Marina de Rapel Airport =

- IATA: none; ICAO: SCMZ

Summary
- Airport type: Private
- Serves: El Manzano (es), Chile
- Elevation AMSL: 344 ft / 105 m
- Coordinates: 34°09′20″S 71°27′22″W

Map
- Location of Marina de Rapel Airport in Chile

Runways
Direction	Length		Surface
Direction	m	ft	Surface
03/21	540	1,772	Grass
- Source: GCM Landings.com Google Maps

Marina de Rapel Airport (Spanish: Aeropuerto Marina de Rapel), (ICAO: SCMZ) is an airport 6 kilometres (3.7 mi) west of El Manzano (es), a lakeside town in the O'Higgins Region of Chile. El Manzano is on the northern arm of Lake Rapel.

The airport runs alongside the Marina de Rapel golf course, and is 300 metres (980 ft) from the Guardia Náutica station and the Capitanía de Puerto de Rapel offices.

There is rising terrain just south of the airport, and hills across the lake to the north. North approach and departure are over the water.

== See also ==
- Transport in Chile
- List of airports in Chile
