= Aguas Blancas Airport =

Airport in Chile

- IATA: none; ICAO: SCGU

Summary
- Airport type: Private
- Serves: Aguas Blancas, Chile
- Elevation AMSL: 3,346 ft (1,020 m)
- Coordinates: 24°7′20″S 69°50′50″W

Map
- Location of Aguas Blancas Airport in Chile

Runways
Direction	Length		Surface
Direction	m	ft	Surface
13/31	1,200	3,937	Gravel
- Source: Google Maps GCM

Aguas Blancas Airport (Spanish: Aeropuerto Aguas Blancas, (ICAO: SCGU) is an airport serving the Aguas Blancas iodine mine in the Antofagasta Region of Chile.

== See also ==
- Transport in Chile
- List of airports in Chile
