= El Alba Airport =

Airport in Chile

- IATA: none; ICAO: SCAB

Summary
- Airport type: Public
- Serves: Melipilla, Chile
- Location: La Lumbrera
- Elevation AMSL: 450 ft (140 m)
- Coordinates: 33°39′31″S 71°17′25″W

Map
- Location of El Alba Airport in Chile

Runways
Direction	Length		Surface
Direction	m	ft	Surface
09/27	517	1,696	Grass
- Source: Landings.com Google Maps GCM

El Alba Airport (Spanish: Aeropuerto El Alba), (ICAO: SCAB) is an airport 6 kilometres (3.7 mi) northwest of Melipilla, a city in the Santiago Metropolitan Region of Chile.

There are hills southeast of the runway. The Melipilla non-directional beacon (Ident: PIL) is located 3.5 nautical miles (6.5 km) east-southeast of the airport.

== See also ==
- Transport in Chile
- List of airports in Chile
