= Santa Rosa de Tabalí Airport =

Santa Rosa de Tabalí Airport Aeropuerto Santa Rosa de Tabalí
- IATA: none; ICAO: SCOT

Summary
- Airport type: Private
- Serves: Santa Rosa de Tabalí, Chile
- Elevation AMSL: 787 ft / 240 m
- Coordinates: 30°40′35″S 71°24′03″W

Map
- Location of Santa Rosa de Tabalí Airport in Chile

Runways
Direction	Length		Surface
Direction	m	ft	Surface
07/25	1,300	4,265	Asphalt

Helipads
Number	Length		Surface
Number	m	ft	Surface
1	35	115	Concrete
- Sources: Landings.com Google Maps GCM

Santa Rosa de Tabalí Airport (Spanish: Aeropuerto Santa Rosa de Tabalí, (ICAO: SCOT)) is an airport serving Santa Rosa de Tabalí, a hacienda winery in the Coquimbo Region of Chile.

The airport is 20 kilometres (12 mi) west-southwest of Ovalle. The west end of the runway has a 180 metres (590 ft) paved overrun that leads to a helipad and parking apron. The local terrain is flat with ravines.

== See also ==
- Transport in Chile
- List of airports in Chile
