= San Fernando Airport (Chile) =

San Fernando Airport Aeropuerto de San Fernando
- IATA: none; ICAO: SCSD

Summary
- Airport type: Public
- Serves: San Fernando, Chile
- Elevation AMSL: 1,079 ft / 329 m
- Coordinates: 34°33′55″S 70°58′05″W

Map
- Location of San Fernando Airport in Chile

Runways
Direction	Length		Surface
Direction	m	ft	Surface
02/20	955	3,133	Asphalt
- Source: Landings.com Google Maps GCM

San Fernando Airport (Spanish: Aeropuerto de San Fernando, (ICAO: SCSD)) is an airport serving San Fernando, a town in the O'Higgins Region of Chile.

The airport is just northeast of the town. There is mountainous terrain to the west.

== See also ==
- Transport in Chile
- List of airports in Chile
