= Diego Portales Airport =

Airport in Valparaíso Region, Chile

- IATA: none; ICAO: SCLQ

Summary
- Airport type: Public
- Serves: La Ligua, Chile
- Elevation AMSL: 250 ft / 76 m
- Coordinates: 32°26′55″S 71°15′30″W

Map
- Location of Diego Portales Airport in Chile

Runways
Direction	Length		Surface
Direction	m	ft	Surface
08/26	770	2,526	Grass
- Source: Landings.com Google Maps GCM

Diego Portales Airport (Spanish: Aeropuerto Diego Portales) (ICAO: SCLQ) is an airport serving La Ligua, a town in the Valparaíso Region of Chile. The airport is 2 kilometres (1.2 mi) west of the town.

There is high terrain north through southeast of the airport.

== See also ==
- Transport in Chile
- List of airports in Chile
