= Posesión Airport =

- IATA: none; ICAO: SCBS

Summary
- Airport type: Public
- Serves: Bahía Posesión, Chile
- Elevation AMSL: 100 ft / 30 m
- Coordinates: 52°17′33″S 68°56′00″W

Map
- Location of Posesión Airport in Chile

Runways
Direction	Length		Surface
Direction	m	ft	Surface
08/26	1,107	3,632	Gravel
- Source: Landings.com Google Maps SkyVector

Posesión Airport Spanish: Aeropuerto Posesión, (ICAO: SCBS) is an airport serving the oil and gas production facilities on the northern shore of Bahía Posesión, the Atlantic entrance to the Strait of Magellan. The airport is in the Magallanes Region of Chile.

The airport is 5 kilometres (3.1 mi) from the Argentina border. There is a steep bluff at the coastline of the bay, less than 500 metres (1,600 ft) south of the runway. West approach and departures are over the water.

== See also ==
- Transport in Chile
- List of airports in Chile
