= San Guillermo Airport =

- IATA: none; ICAO: SCGI

Summary
- Airport type: Public
- Serves: Retiro, Chile
- Elevation AMSL: 495 ft / 151 m
- Coordinates: 36°00′00″S 71°49′42″W

Map
- Location of San Guillermo Airport in Chile

Runways
Direction	Length		Surface
Direction	m	ft	Surface
17/35	701	2,300	Grass

Helipads
Number	Length		Surface
Number	m	ft	Surface
1	8	26	Asphalt
- Source: Landings.com Google Maps GCM

San Guillermo Airport (Spanish: Aeropuerto San Guillermo), (ICAO: SCGI) is an airport 8 kilometres (5.0 mi) northwest of Retiro, a town in the Maule Region of Chile.

== See also ==
- Transport in Chile
- List of airports in Chile
