= San Pedro Verfrut Airport =

Verfrut Airport Aeropuerto de San Pedro Verfrut
- IATA: none; ICAO: SCVF

Summary
- Airport type: Public
- Serves: San Pedro, Chile
- Elevation AMSL: 443 ft / 135 m
- Coordinates: 34°0′25″S 071°23′32″W

Map
- Location of San Pedro Verfrut Airport in Chile

Runways
Direction	Length		Surface
Direction	m	ft	Surface
16/34	950	3,117	Grass
- Sources: Landings.com Google Maps GCM

Verfrut Airport (Spanish: Aeropuerto de San Pedro Verfrut, (ICAO: SCVF)) is an airstrip 14 kilometres (9 mi) south-southeast of San Pedro, a town in the Santiago Metropolitan Region of Chile. The airport is also 6 kilometres (3.7 mi) south of the Estación Terrena Longovilo (es), a large satellite communications facility.

The airstrip runs alongside a highway. There is rising terrain west and southwest.

== See also ==
- Transport in Chile
- List of airports in Chile
