= Corte Alto Airport =

Airport in Chile

- IATA: none; ICAO: SCPR

Summary
- Airport type: Public
- Serves: Purranque, Chile
- Elevation AMSL: 416 ft / 127 m
- Coordinates: 40°56′30″S 73°10′07″W

Map
- Location of Corte Alto Airport in Chile

Runways
Direction	Length		Surface
Direction	m	ft	Surface
18/36	710	2,329	Grass
- Source: Landings.com Google Maps GCM

Corte Alto Airport (Spanish: Aeropuerto Corte Alto), (ICAO: SCPR) is an airport 3 kilometres (1.9 mi) south of Purranque, a town in the Los Lagos Region of Chile.

Runway 36 has an additional 230 metres (750 ft) grass overrun available.

== See also ==
- Transport in Chile
- List of airports in Chile
