= Las Bandurrias Airport =

- IATA: none; ICAO: SCXR

Summary
- Airport type: Public
- Serves: Riñinahue (es), Chile
- Elevation AMSL: 328 ft / 100 m
- Coordinates: 40°19′15″S 72°13′30″W

Map
- Location of Las Bandurrias Airport in Chile

Runways
Direction	Length		Surface
Direction	m	ft	Surface
12/30	650	2,133	Grass
- Source: Landings.com Google Maps

Las Bandurrias Airport Spanish: Aeropuerto Las Bandurrias, (ICAO: SCXR) is an airstrip serving Riñinahue (es), a scattered community 22 kilometres (14 mi) east of Lago Ranco, a town in the Los Lagos Region of Chile.

West approach and departure are over Ranco Lake.

There is mountainous terrain north and south of the runway.

== See also ==
- Transport in Chile
- List of airports in Chile
