= El Huachi Airport =

El Huachi Airport Aeropuerto El Huachi
- IATA: none; ICAO: SCEH

Summary
- Airport type: Closed
- Serves: Santa Bárbara, Chile
- Elevation AMSL: 1,558 ft / 475 m
- Coordinates: 37°38′50″S 71°45′15″W

Map
- Location of El Huachi Airport in Chile

Runways
Direction	Length		Surface
Direction	ft	m	Surface
Closed
- Source: Google Maps GCM

El Huachi Airport (Spanish: Aeropuerto El Huachi, (ICAO: SCEH)) was an airstrip near Santa Bárbara, a town in the Bío Bío Region of Chile.

Google Earth Historical Imagery (4/28/2007) shows an approximately 800 metres (2,600 ft) grass airstrip cut through a forested ridge. The (11/29/2009) image shows the runway and parking apron completely replanted to trees.

== See also ==
- Transport in Chile
- List of airports in Chile
