= List of airports in Chile =

This is a list of airports in Chile, sorted by location.

== Airports ==
Airport names shown in bold indicate the airport has scheduled commercial airline service. Links to Spanish language Wikipedia are added for some communities.

City served	Region	ICAO	IATA	Airport name
Achao	Los Lagos	SCAH		Tolquién Airport
Aguas Blancas (es)	Antofagasta	SCGU		Aguas Blancas Airport
Algarrobo	Valparaíso	SCSG		San Gerónimo Airport
Alhué	Metropolitana	SCAF		San Alfonso Airport – closed
Alto del Carmen	Atacama	SCTQ		Tres Quebradas Airport
Ancud	Los Lagos	SCAC	ZUD	Pupelde Airport
Angol	La Araucanía	SCGO		Angol Los Confines Airport
Antofagasta	Antofagasta	SCFA	ANF	**Andrés Sabella Gálvez International Airport**
Antofagasta	Antofagasta	SCMB		La Chimba Airport – closed
Antofagasta	Antofagasta	SCLE		La Escondida Airport
Arica	Arica y Parinacota	SCAR	ARI	**Chacalluta International Airport**
Arica	Arica y Parinacota	SCAE		El Buitre Airfield
Ayacara (es)	Los Lagos	SCAY		Ayacara Airport
Bahía Inútil	Magallanes	SCBI	DPB	Pampa Guanaco Airport
Bahía Posesión	Magallanes	SCBS		Posesión Airport
Balmaceda	Aysén	SCBA	BBA	**Balmaceda Airport**
Bulnes	Ñuble	SCUL		Bulnes El Litral Airport
Bulnes	Ñuble	SCUR		Bulnes Rucamelen Airport – closed
Cabildo	Valparaíso	SCDL		El Algarrobo Airport
Calama	Antofagasta	SCCF	CJC	**El Loa Airport**
Caldera	Atacama	SCCL		Caldera Airport
Caleta Tortel	Aysén	SCCR		Caleta Tortel Airport
Caleta Tortel	Aysén	SCRB		Río Bravo Airport
Cañete	Bío Bío	SCNM		Las Misiones Airport
Carrizal Bajo	Atacama	SCHU		Gran Cañon Airport
Casablanca	Valparaíso	SCTW		El Tapihue Airport
Casablanca	Valparaíso	SCFL		Fundo Loma Larga Airport
Casablanca	Valparaíso	SCCS		Santa Rita Airport
Casablanca	Valparaíso	SCVA		Viñamar Airport
Castro	Los Lagos	SCST	WCA	Gamboa Airport
Cauquenes	Maule	SCCN		Alto Cauquenes Airport
Cauquenes	Maule	SCCA		El Boldo Airport
Cerro Castillo	Magallanes	SCPY		Cerro Castillo Airport
Cerro Paranal	Antofagasta	SCPA		Cerro Paranal Airport
Cerro Sombrero	Magallanes	SCSB	SMB	Franco Bianco Airport
Chaitén	Los Lagos	SCGN		Caleta Gonzalo Airport
Chaitén	Los Lagos	~~SCTN~~	~~WCH~~	Chaitén Airfield – closed
Chaitén	Los Lagos	SCHD		Chumildén Airport
Chaitén	Los Lagos	SCEA		El Amarillo Airport
Chaitén	Los Lagos	SCLR		Los Alerces Airport
Chaitén	Los Lagos	SCTN	WCH	Nuevo Chaitén Airport
Chaitén	Los Lagos	SCPN		Pillán Airport
Chaitén	Los Lagos	SCUI		Pumalín Airport
Chaitén	Los Lagos	SCRH		Reñihúe Airport
Chaitén	Los Lagos	SCHT		Tic Toc Airport
Chaitén	Los Lagos	SCDH		Vodudahue Airport
Chañaral	Atacama	SCRA	CNR	Chañaral Airport
Chépica	O'Higgins	SCEK		Chépica Airport – closed
Chile Chico	Aysén	SCCC	CCH	Chile Chico Airfield
Chillán	Ñuble	SCCH	YAI	General Bernardo O'Higgins Airport
Chillán	Ñuble	SCFK		Chillán Fundo El Carmen Airport
Chillán	Ñuble	~~SCAV~~		La Vertiente Airport – closed
Cholguán (es)	Ñuble	SCGS		Siberia Airport
Chonchi	Los Lagos	SCFS		Los Calafates Airport
Choshuenco	Los Lagos	SCHN		Chan Chan Airport
Choshuenco	Los Lagos	SCCM		Molco Airport
Cobquecura	Ñuble	SCQR		Los Morros Airport
Cochamó	Los Lagos	SCKM		Cochamó Airport
Cochrane	Aysén	SCHR	LGR	Cochrane Airfield
Cochrane	Aysén	SCVS		Lago Vargas Airport
Coelemu	Ñuble	SCKT		Torreón Airport
Coihueco	Ñuble	SCPI		Pullamí Airport
Collipulli	La Araucanía	SCKO		Agua Buena Airport
Combarbalá	Coquimbo	SCCB		Combarbalá Airport
Combarbalá	Coquimbo	SCCG		Cogoti La Pelicana Airport
Concepción	Bío Bío	SCIE	CCP	**Carriel Sur International Airport**
Constitución	Maule	SCCT		Quivolgo Airport
Contao (es)	Los Lagos	SCCK		Contao Airport
Copiapó	Atacama	SCAT	CPO	**Desierto de Atacama Airport**
Copiapó	Atacama	SCHA		Chamonate Airport
Coposa	Tarapacá	SCKP		Coposa Airport
Coyhaique	Aysén	SCCY	GXQ	Teniente Vidal Airfield
Cumpeo (es)	Maule	SCUM		Cumpeo La Obra Airport
Cunco	La Araucanía	SCGY		Los Guayes Airport
Cunco	La Araucanía	SCLK		Lago Colico Airport
Curacaví	Metropolitana	SCCV		Curacaví Airport
Curicó	Maule	SCKI		Los Lirios Airport
Curicó	Maule	SCTM		Curicó La Montaña Airport
Curicó	Maule	SCIC	ZCQ	General Freire Airfield
Dalcahue	Los Lagos	SCPQ	MHC	**Mocopulli Airport**
El Manzano (es)	O'Higgins	SCMZ		Marina de Rapel Airport
El Salvador	Atacama	SCES	ESR	Ricardo García Posada Airport
Entrada Baker (es)	Aysén	SCEB		Entrada Baker Airport
Entrada Mayer (es)	Aysén	SCEY		Entrada Mayer Airport
Estación Chañar (es)	Coquimbo	SCEC		Pelicano Airport
Fachinal (es)	Aysén	SCFC		Fachinal Airport
Freire	La Araucanía	SCSU		Santa Lucía Airport
Freirina	Atacama	SCFF		Freirina Airport
Frutillar	Los Lagos	SCAA		Añorada Airport – closed
Frutillar	Los Lagos	SCFI		Fundo Tehuén Airport
Frutillar	Los Lagos	SCFR		Frutillar Airport
Futaleufú	Los Lagos	SCFT	FFU	Futaleufú Airfield
Futrono	Los Ríos	SCFU		Loncopan Airport
General Carrera Lake	Aysén	SCLO		Leones Airport
General Carrera Lake	Aysén	SCHH		Punta Baja Airport
Guangualí (es)	Coquimbo	SCLV		La Viña Airport
Hornopirén	Los Lagos	SCRN		Río Negro Airport
Hualaihué	Los Lagos	SCHW		Hualaihué Airport
Hueicolla	Los Ríos	SCHK		Hueicomilla Airport
Huépil (es)	Bío Bío	SCHE		Rucamanqui Airport
Icalma Lake	La Araucanía	SCQI		Icalma Airport
Illapel	Coquimbo	SCIL		Illapel Aucó Airport
Iquique	Tarapacá	SCDA	IQQ	**Diego Aracena International Airport**
Iquique	Tarapacá	SCCD		Los Condores Airport – closed
Isla Apiao (es)	Los Lagos	SCIA		Isla Apiao Airport
Isla Butachauques (es)	Los Lagos	SCIB		Isla Butachauques Airport
Isla Dawson	Magallanes	SCDW		Almirante Schroeders Airport
Isla de Maipo	Metropolitana	SCVT		Ventanas Radioayuda Airport
Isla de Pascua	Valparaíso	SCIP	IPC	**Mataveri International Airport**
Isla Quenac (es)	Los Lagos	SCQE		Isla Quenac Airport
Isla Rey Jorge (King George Island)	Magallanes	SCRM	TNM	Teniente R. Marsh Airport
Isla Las Huichas (es)	Aysén	SCIH		Caleta Blanco Airport
Isla Mocha	Bío Bío	SCIM		Isla Mocha Airport
Isla Mocha	Bío Bío	SCHM		Punta El Saco Airport
Isla Robinson Crusoe	Valparaíso	SCIR		Robinson Crusoe Airfield
Isla San Felix	Valparaíso	SCFX		Isla San Felix Airport
Isla Santa María	Bío Bío	SCIS		Puerto Sur Airport
Isla Talcan	Los Lagos	SCIK		Isla Talcan Airport
Isla Tierra del Fuego	Magallanes	SCIT		Iván Martínez Airport
La Junta (es)	Los Lagos	SCLJ		La Junta Airport
La Ligua	Valparaíso	SCLQ		Diego Portales Airport
La Serena	Coquimbo	SCSE	LSC	**La Florida Airport**
La Unión	Los Ríos	SCVV		Los Maitenes de Villa Vieja Airport
La Unión	Los Ríos	SCGA		Punta Galera Airport
Lago Brown (es)	Aysén	SCBR		Lago Brown Airport
Lago Ranco	Los Ríos	SCXR		Las Bandurrias Airport
Lago Ranco	Los Ríos	SCAQ		Arquilhue Airport
Lago Verde	Aysén	SCRE		Estancia Río Cisnes Airport
Lago Verde	Aysén	SCVE		Lago Verde Airport
Lago Verde	Aysén	SCRC		Villa Tapera Airport
Lampa	Metropolitana	SCKL		Lampa Lipangui Airport
Lampa	Metropolitana	SCHL		Hacienda Lipangue Airport
Laraquete	Bío Bío	SCLY		La Playa Airport
Las Tacas (es)	Coquimbo	SCQT		Las Tacas Airport
Lautaro	La Araucanía	SCLS		Esperanza Airport
Lautaro	La Araucanía	SCLA		Lautaro Airport – closed
Lebu	Bío Bío	SCLB		Los Pehuenches Airport
Licantén	Maule	SCKN		Licancel Airport
Linares	Maule	SCAV		Achibueno Airport
Linares	Maule	SCLN	ZLR	Linares Airport
Litueche	O'Higgins	SCTU		Litueche Airport
Llanada Grande (es)	Los Lagos	SCLD		Llanada Grande Airport
Llico – Vichuquén	Maule	SCLI		Torca Airport
Llifén	Los Ríos	SCLF		Llifen Calcuruppe Airport
Llifén	Los Ríos	SCIF		Chollinco Airport
Lolol	O'Higgins	SCAO		Palo Alto Airport
Longaví	Maule	SCUT		Verfrut Sur Airport – closed
Lonquimay	La Araucanía	SCCU		Lolco Airport
Lonquimay	La Araucanía	SCNU		Marimenuco Airfield – closed
Lonquimay	La Araucanía	SCQY		Villa Portales Airport
Los Andes	Valparaíso	SCAN	LOB	San Rafael Airport
Los Ángeles	Bío Bío	SCGE	LSQ	María Dolores Airport
Los Ángeles	Bío Bío	SCGH		Cholguahue Airport
Los Sauces	La Araucanía	SCGB		Guadaba Airport
Los Vilos	Coquimbo	SCHO		Punta Chungo Airport
Marchigüe	O'Higgins	SCMH		La Esperanza Airport
Marchigüe	O'Higgins	SCVJ		Paredes Viejas Airport
Marchigüe	O'Higgins	SCLU		La Laguna Airport
María Elena	Antofagasta	SCNE		María Elena Airport – closed
Melinka	Aysén	SCMK		Melinka Airport
Melipilla	Metropolitana	SCAB		El Alba/La Lumbrera Airport
Melipilla	Metropolitana	SCTS		Santa Teresa del Almendral Airport
Melipilla	Metropolitana	SCMP		Melipilla Airport
Melipilla	Metropolitana	SCME		Cuatro Diablos Airport
Mialqui (es)	Coquimbo	SCMI		Los Tricahues Airport
Michilla (es)	Antofagasta	SCMY		Carolina Airport
Molina	Maule	SCMO		Los Monos Airport
Molina	Maule	SCKK		La Cascada Airport
Molina	Maule	SCMV		Viña San Pedro Airport
Molina	Maule	SCXA		Alupenhue Airport
Mulchén	Bío Bío	SCPP		Poco a Poco Airport – closed
Nadis	Aysén	SCND		Nadis Airport
Ollagüe	Antofagasta			Ollagüe Airport
Olmué	Valparaíso	SCOM		Olmué Aerodrome
Osorno	Los Lagos	SCJO	ZOS	**Cañal Bajo Carlos Hott Siebert Airport**
Osorno	Los Lagos	SCCP		Callipulli Airport – closed
Osorno	Los Lagos	SCJK		Juan Kemp Airport
Osorno	Los Lagos	SCQM		Las Quemas Airport
Osorno	Los Lagos	SCOP		Pilauco Airport
Ovalle	Coquimbo	SCOV	OVL	El Tuqui Airport
Ovalle	Coquimbo	SCFJ		Fray Jorge Airport
Ovalle	Coquimbo	SCAD		Santa Adriana Airport
Ovalle	Coquimbo	SCOY		Huayanay Airport
Paillaco	Los Ríos	SCPL		Calpulli Airport
Paine	Metropolitana	SCAU		Juan Enrique Airport
Paine	Metropolitana	~~SCMN~~		Paine Mansel Airport – closed
Palena	Los Lagos	SCAP	WAP	Alto Palena Airfield
Palmilla	O'Higgins	SCAG	LSQ	Agua Santa Airport
Panguipulli	Los Ríos	SCGP		Curaco Airport – closed
Panguipulli	Los Ríos	SCPG		Panguipulli Airport
Panguipulli	Los Ríos	SCNG		Papageno Airport – closed
Panimávida	Maule	SCIV		Panimávida Airport – closed
Paredones	O'Higgins	SCRW		Rucalonco Airport
Parral	Maule	SCEO		El Salto Airport
María Elena	Antofagasta	SCPD		Pedro de Valdivia Airport
Pelarco	Maule	SCFO		La Reforma Airport
Pelluhue	Maule	SCKE		Piedra Negra Airport
Pencahue	Maule	SCLG		La Aguada Airport
Peralillo	O'Higgins	SCSV		Viñasutil Airport
Peulla (es)	Los Lagos	SCPU		Peulla Airport
Peumo	O'Higgins	SCPW		Peumo Airport
Pichidangui	Coquimbo	SCDI		Pichidangui Airport
Pichidegua	O'Higgins	SCHG		Almahue Airport
Pichilemu	O'Higgins	SCMU		Panilonco Aerodrome
Pichilemu	O'Higgins	SCPM		Pichilemu Aerodrome
Pichilemu	O'Higgins	SCMN		Mónaco Aerodrome
Pirque	Metropolitana	SCZE		Estero Seco Airport
Pirque	Metropolitana	SCEP		El Principal Airport
Pisagua	Tarapacá	SCPS		Pisagua Airport
Porvenir	Magallanes	SCFM	WPR	**Capitán Fuentes Martínez Airport**
Pucón	La Araucanía	SCPC	ZPC	Pucón Airport
Pucón	La Araucanía	SCKQ		Curimanques Airport
Puelo Bajo (es)	Los Lagos	SCPB		Puelo Bajo Airport
Puerto Aysén	Aysén	SCAS	WPA	Cabo Juan Román Airfield
Puerto Cisnes	Aysén	SCPK		Puerto Cisnes Airport
Puerto Guadal (es)	Aysén	SCMC		Meseta Cosmelli Airport
Puerto Ingeniero Ibáñez	Aysén	SCII		Puerto Ingeniero Ibáñez Airport
Puerto Marín Balmaceda (es)	Aysén	SCMA		Puerto Marín Balmaceda Airport
Puerto Montt	Los Lagos	SCTE	PMC	**El Tepual Airport**
Puerto Montt	Los Lagos	SCPF		Marcel Marchant Airport
Puerto Natales	Magallanes	SCNT	PNT	**Teniente Julio Gallardo Airport**
Puerto Octay	Los Lagos	SCNO		Ñochaco Airport
Puerto Octay	Los Lagos	SCOC		Las Araucarias Airport
Puerto Sánchez (es)	Aysén	SCSZ		Puerto Sánchez Airport
Puerto Varas	Los Lagos	SCPV	PUX	El Mirador Airport
Puerto Varas	Los Lagos	SCDD		Don Dobri Airport
Puerto Williams	Magallanes	SCGZ	WPU	**Guardiamarina Zañartu Airport**
Punta Arenas	Magallanes	SCCI	PUQ	**Presidente Carlos Ibáñez del Campo International Airport**
Punta Arenas	Magallanes	SCNS		Sandra Scabini Airport – closed
Punta Arenas	Magallanes	SCID		Marco Davison Bascur Airport
Purranque	Los Lagos	SCPR		Corte Alto Airport
Puyehue	Los Lagos	SCYC		La Capilla Airport
Puyehue	Los Lagos	SCYL		Licán Airport
Puyuhuapi	Aysén	SCPH		Puyuhuapi Airport
Queilén	Los Lagos	SCQX		Queilén Airport
Quellón	Los Lagos	SCON		Quellón Airport
Quemchi	Los Lagos	SCQW		Quemchi Airport
Quilleco	Bío Bío	SCDQ		San Lorenzo Airport
Quillota	Valparaíso	SCQL		El Boco Airport
Quinta de Tilcoco	O'Higgins	SCPO		Isla Picton Airport
Quintero	Valparaíso	SCER		Quintero Airport
Rancagua	O'Higgins	SCRG	QRC	Rancagua de la Independencia Airport
Ranguelmo (es)	Ñuble	SCJC		James Conrad Airport
Rapel	O'Higgins	SCRL		La Estrella Airport
Rapel	O'Higgins	SCSO		Costa del Sol Airport
Rapel	O'Higgins	SCRP		Rapelhuapi Airport
Rapel	O'Higgins	SCGL		Las Agullas Airport
Recinto (es)	Ñuble	SCAK		Atacalco Sul Airport
Rengo	O'Higgins	SCNR		Fundo Naicura Airport – closed
Rengo	O'Higgins	SCGM		Los Gomeros Airport
Retiro	Maule	SCHP		Copihue Airport
Retiro	Maule	SCRT		El Almendro Airport
Retiro	Maule	SCAJ		Las Alpacas Airport
Retiro	Maule	SCYR		Los Maitenes Airport
Retiro	Maule	SCDS		San Andrés Airport
Retiro	Maule	SCGI		San Guillermo Airport
Riñihue	Los Lagos	SCVG		El Vergel Airport
Río Bueno	Los Ríos	SCBN		Cotreumo Airport
Río Bueno	Los Ríos	SCRQ		Rucananco Airport
Río Bueno	Los Ríos	SCKD		El Cardal Airport
Río Claro	Maule	SCUP		Lontuecito Airport
Río Claro	Maule	SCBV		Bellavista Airport
Río Frío	Los Lagos	SCRI		Río Frío Airport
Puerto Murta (es)	Aysén	SCRU		Puerto Murta Airport
Romeral	Maule	SCOE		Romeral San Miguel Airport
Romeral	Maule	SCRO		Santa Bárbara Airport
Sagrada Familia	Maule	SCED		Los Cedros Airport
Salamanca	Coquimbo	SCXB		Las Brujas Airport
Salamanca	Coquimbo	SCNK		Los Pelambres Airport
Salar de Atacama	Antofagasta	SCSL		El Salar Airport
Salar de Atacama	Antofagasta	SCSM		Minsal Airport
San Carlos	Ñuble	SCKA		San Carlos Santa Marta Airport
San Clemente	Maule	SCSK		Colorado Airport
San Felipe	Valparaíso	SCSF	SSD	Víctor Lafón Airport
San Fernando	O'Higgins	SCSD		San Fernando Airport
San Javier	Maule	SCSJ		San Javier Airport
San Javier	Maule	SCMG		Santa María de Mingre Airport
San Javier	Maule	SCLM		Las Mercedes Airport
San Nicolás	Ñuble	SCNI		San Nicolás Santa Eugena Airport
San Pablo	Los Lagos	SCSQ		Quilpe Airport
San Pedro	Metropolitana	SCVF		San Pedro Verfrut Airport
San Pedro de Atacama	Antofagasta	SCPE		San Pedro de Atacama Airport
San Rafael Lake	Aysén	SCRF		Laguna San Raphael Airport
San Sebastián (es)	Magallanes	SCSS		San Sebastián Airport
San Vicente de Tagua Tagua	O'Higgins	SCET		San Vicente de Tagua Tagua Airport – closed
Santa Bárbara	Bío Bío	SCEH		El Huachi Airport – closed
Santa Cruz	O'Higgins	SCUZ		Santa Cruz Airport
Santa Cruz	O'Higgins	SCBD		Santa Cruz El Boldal Airport
Santa Rosa de Tabalí	Coquimbo	SCOT		Santa Rosa de Tabali Airport
Santiago	Metropolitana	SCTB		Eulogio Sánchez Airport
Santiago	Metropolitana	SCEL	SCL	**Arturo Merino Benítez International Airport**
Santiago	Metropolitana	SCLC		Municipal de Vitacura Airport
Santiago	Metropolitana	SCVH		La Victoria de Chacabuco Airport
Santiago	Metropolitana	SCTI	ULC	Los Cerrillos Airport – closed
Santiago	Metropolitana	SCBQ	ZBQ	El Bosque Airport
Santiago	Metropolitana	SCHC		Santiago Chicureo Airport
Santo Domingo	Valparaíso	SCSN		Santo Domingo Airfield
Segundo Corral (es)	Los Lagos	SCSR		Segundo Corral Alto Airfield
Talagante	Metropolitana	SCEG		El Corte Airport
Talca	Maule	SCTL	TLX	Panguilemo Airport
Taltal	Antofagasta	SCTT	TTC	Las Breas Airport
Temuco	La Araucanía	SCTC	PZS	Temuco Maquehue Airport
Temuco	La Araucanía	SCQP	ZCO	**La Araucanía International Airport**
Teno	Maule	~~SCAM~~		Alempue Airport – closed
Teno	Maule			Uni Frutti Airport
Teodoro Schmidt	La Araucanía	SCSH		El Budi Airport
Termas de Puyehue	Los Lagos	SCOL		Refugio del Lago Airport
Tierra del Fuego	Magallanes	SCNY		Yendegaia Airport
Tiltil	Metropolitana	SCSA		Alberto Santos Dumont Airport
Timaukel	Magallanes	SCAZ		Azopardo Airport
Timaukel	Magallanes	SCFN		Russfin Airport
Tirúa	Bío Bío	SCQK		Tirúa Airport
Tocopilla	Antofagasta	SCBE	TOQ	Barriles Airport
Tongoy	Coquimbo	SCTG		Tongoy Airport – closed
Tortel	Aysén	SCTP		Río Pascua Airport
Traiguén	La Araucanía	SCQC		Traiguén Quino La Colmena Airport
Traiguén	La Araucanía	SCTR		Traiguén Airport
Valdivia	Los Ríos	SCVL		Las Marías Airport
Valdivia	Los Ríos	SCVD	ZAL	**Pichoy Airfield**
Vallenar	Atacama	SCLL	VLR	Vallenar Airport
Vichuquén	Maule	SCVQ		Vichuquén Cuatro Pantanos Airport
Vichuquén	Maule	SCVK		Vichuquén El Alamo Airport
Vichuquén	Maule	SCDM		Vichuquén Airport
Victoria	La Araucanía	SCTO	ZIC	Victoria Airport
Victoria	La Araucanía	SCVO		Victoria María Ester Airport
Vicuña	Coquimbo	SCVN		Vicuña Huancara Airport
Vicuña	Coquimbo	SCVC		Vicuña Airport
Vilcún	La Araucanía	SCVY		Vilcún La Malla Airport
Villa Baviera	Maule	SCVB		Hospital Villa Baviera Airport
Villa Las Estrellas	Magallanes	SCRM	TNM	Teniente R. Marsh Airport
Villa O'Higgins	Aysén	SCOH		Río Mayer Airport
Villa O'Higgins	Aysén	SCIO		Laguna Redonda Airport
Villarrica	La Araucanía	SCVI		Villarrica Airport
Villarrica	La Araucanía	SCMF		Malloco Airport
Viña del Mar – Concón	Valparaíso	SCVM	KNA	Viña del Mar Airport
Viña del Mar	Valparaíso	SCRD	VAP	Rodelillo Airfield
Yumbel	Bío Bío	SCYB		Yumbel Trilahue Airport
Zapallar	Valparaíso	SCZC		Zapallar Casas Viejas Airport
**Airports with unverified coordinates**				
Lago Verde	Aysén	SCBC		Cacique Blanco Airport
Domeyko (es)	Atacama	SCDK		Domeyko Airfield
Llanada Grande (es)	Los Lagos	SCGR		El Manso Airport
Osorno	Los Lagos	SCOS		Pampa Alegre Aerodrome
Parron	Maule			Parron Airport
Punta Catalina (es)	Magallanes	SCPX		Punta Catalina Airport
Vilcún	La Araucanía	SCVU		Vilcún Agromanzun Airport

== See also ==
- List of the busiest airports in Chile
- Directorate General of Civil Aviation (Chile)
- Transportation in Chile
- List of airports by ICAO code: S#SC – Chile
- Wikipedia:WikiProject Aviation/Airline destination lists: South America#Chile
