= Llanada Grande Airport =

- IATA: none; ICAO: SCLD

Summary
- Airport type: Public
- Serves: Llanada Grande
- Location: Chile
- Elevation AMSL: 997 ft / 304 m
- Coordinates: 41°52′9.7″S 071°56′21.6″W

Map
- Location of Llanada Grande Airport in Chile

Runways
Direction	Length		Surface
Direction	ft	m	Surface
16/34	3,500	1,067	Grass
- Source: Landings.com

Llanada Grande Airport (ICAO: SCLD) is a public use airport located near Llanada Grande, Los Lagos, Chile.

== See also ==
- List of airports in Chile
