= El Buitre Airfield =

Military airport near Arica, Chile

El Buitre Airport
- IATA: none; ICAO: SCAE

Summary
- Airport type: Military
- Serves: Arica, Chile
- Elevation AMSL: 328 ft / 100 m
- Coordinates: 18°30′31″S 70°17′20″W

Map
- Location of El Buitre Airport in Chile

Runways
Direction	Length		Surface
Direction	m	ft	Surface
09/27	1,200	3,937	Asphalt

Helipads
Number	Length		Surface
Number	m	ft	Surface
1	22	72	Asphalt
- Source: Landings.com Google Maps GCM

El Buitre Airport (Spanish: Aeródromo El Buitre, (ICAO: SCAE)) is a military airport just south of Arica, a Pacific coastal city in the Tarapacá Region of Chile.

The runway is 2 kilometres (1.2 mi) inland from the Pacific shore. There is distant rising terrain southeast of the airport.

The Arica VOR-DME (Ident: ARI) is located 8.9 nautical miles (16.5 km) north-northwest of the airport.

== See also ==
- Transport in Chile
- List of airports in Chile
