= Lautaro Airport =

- IATA: none; ICAO: SCLA

Summary
- Airport type: Closed
- Serves: Lautaro, Chile
- Elevation AMSL: 699 ft / 213 m
- Coordinates: 38°32′34.2″S 72°25′18.5″W

Map
- Location of Lautaro Airport in Chile

Runways
Direction	Length		Surface
Direction	ft	m	Surface
Closed
- Source: Landings.com Google Maps

Lautaro Airport (ICAO: SCLA) was an airport serving Lautaro, a town in the Araucanía Region of Chile.

The former 1,200 metres (3,900 ft) grass runway has been overbuilt by high density housing. Google Earth Historical Imagery shows the housing was built sometime prior to 2 December 2010.

== See also ==
- Transport in Chile
- List of airports in Chile
