= Santa Lucía Airport (Chile) =

- IATA: none; ICAO: SCSU

Summary
- Airport type: Public
- Serves: Freire, Chile
- Elevation AMSL: 705 ft (215 m)
- Coordinates: 38°55′09″S 72°22′00″W

Map
- Location of Santa Lucía Airport in Chile

Runways
Direction	Length		Surface
Direction	m	ft	Surface
08/26	600	1,969	Grass
- Source: Landings.com Google Maps GCM

Santa Lucía Airport Spanish: Aeropuerto Santa Lucía, (ICAO: SCSU) is a rural airport 23 kilometres (14 mi) east of Freire, a town in the Araucanía Region of Chile.

The Temuco VOR-DME (Ident: TCO) is located 15.4 nautical miles (28.5 km) northwest of the airport.

== See also ==
- Transport in Chile
- List of airports in Chile
