= Punta Chungo Airport =

- IATA: none; ICAO: SCHO

Summary
- Airport type: Private
- Serves: Los Vilos, Chile
- Elevation AMSL: 249 ft / 76 m
- Coordinates: 31°53′05″S 71°28′47″W

Map
- Location of Punta Chungo Airport in Chile

Runways
Direction	Length		Surface
Direction	m	ft	Surface
04/22	600	1,969	Gravel
- Source: Landings.com Google Maps GCM

Punta Chungo Airport Spanish: Aeropuerto Punta Chungo, (ICAO: SCHO) is an airport serving Los Vilos, a Pacific coastal town in the Coquimbo Region of Chile.

The airport is north of Los Vilos and 1.6 kilometres (1 mi) inland from the coast. There is distant rising terrain north and east.

== See also ==
- Transport in Chile
- List of airports in Chile
