= Los Monos Airport =

- IATA: none; ICAO: SCMO

Summary
- Airport type: Public
- Serves: Molina, Chile
- Elevation AMSL: 574 ft / 175 m
- Coordinates: 35°11′25″S 71°25′10″W

Map
- Location of Los Monos Airport in Chile

Runways
Direction	Length		Surface
Direction	m	ft	Surface
04/22	725	2,379	Grass
- Source: GCM Google Maps

Los Monos Airport (Spanish: Aeropuerto Los Monos), (ICAO: SCMO) is an airstrip 15 kilometres (9.3 mi) southwest of Molina, a city in the Maule Region of Chile.

The Curico VOR-DME (Ident: ICO) is located 16.7 nautical miles (31 km) northeast of the airstrip. There is nearby high terrain southwest through north of the runway.

== See also ==
- Transport in Chile
- List of airports in Chile
