= El Algarrobo Airport =

Airstrip in Valparaíso Region, Chile

- IATA: none; ICAO: SCDL

Summary
- Airport type: Private
- Serves: Cabildo, Chile
- Elevation AMSL: 951 ft / 290 m
- Coordinates: 32°28′20″S 70°59′34″W

Map
- Location of El Algarrobo Airport in Chile

Runways
Direction	Length		Surface
Direction	m	ft	Surface
16/34	451	1,480	Grass
- Source: Landings.com Google Maps GCM

El Algarrobo Airport Spanish: Aeropuerto El Algarrobo, (ICAO: SCDL) is a rural airstrip 10 kilometres (6.2 mi) up a mountain valley from Cabildo, a town in the Valparaíso Region of Chile.

There is nearby mountainous terrain in all quadrants. The runway has 140 metres (460 ft) of unpaved overrun on the north end.

The Tabon VOR-DME (Ident: TBN) is located 27.9 nautical miles (51.7 km) south-southeast of the airstrip.

== See also ==
- Transport in Chile
- List of airports in Chile
