= Punta Baja Airport =

- IATA: none; ICAO: SCHH

Summary
- Airport type: Private
- Serves: General Carrera Lake, Chile
- Elevation AMSL: 721 ft / 220 m
- Coordinates: 46°47′35″S 72°47′45″W

Map
- Location of Punta Baja Airport in Chile

Runways
| Direction | Length | | Surface |
| Direction | m | ft | Surface |
|---|---|---|---|
| 11/29 | 808 | 2,651 | Grass |
- Source: Landings.com Google Maps GCM

Punta Baja Airport (ICAO: SCHH) is an airstrip on the shore of General Carrera Lake in the Aysén Region of Chile. The nearest village is Puerto Guadal (es) 8 kilometres (5.0 mi) away on the other side of the lake.

There is rising terrain west of the runway. Southeast approach and departures are over the water.

== See also ==
- Transport in Chile
- List of airports in Chile
