= Santa Adriana Airport =

- IATA: none; ICAO: SCAD

Summary
- Airport type: Public
- Serves: Ovalle, Chile
- Elevation AMSL: 558 ft (170 m)
- Coordinates: 30°37′45″S 71°16′25″W

Map
- Location of Santa Adriana Airport in Chile

Runways
Direction	Length		Surface
Direction	m	ft	Surface
06/24	698	2,290	Gravel
- Source: Landings.com Google Maps

Santa Adriana Airport (Spanish: Aeropuerto de Santa Adriana, (ICAO: SCAD)) is an airport serving Ovalle, a city in the Coquimbo Region of Chile.

The airport is 6 kilometres (3.7 mi) southwest of Ovalle. There is rising terrain north of the runway.

== See also ==
- Transport in Chile
- List of airports in Chile
