= La Vertiente Airport (Chile) =

- IATA: none; ICAO: SCAV

Summary
- Airport type: Defunct
- Serves: Chillán, Chile
- Elevation AMSL: 459 ft / 140 m
- Coordinates: 36°36′46″S 72°02′30″W

Map
- Location of La Vertiente Airport in Chile

Runways
Direction	Length		Surface
Direction	m	ft	Surface
Closed
- Source: Landings.com Google Maps

La Vertiente Airport Spanish: Aeropuerto de La Vertiente, (ICAO: SCAV) was a public use airport located near Chillán, Bío Bío, Chile.

Google Earth Historical Imagery (2/10/2012) shows a 600 metres (2,000 ft) grass runway. The (2/12/2013) imagery shows a pivot irrigation system installed and the central portion of the runway under cultivation. Current (12/7/2017) has the section plowed and cultivated.

== See also ==
- Transport in Chile
- List of airports in Chile
