= Butachauques Airport =

Chilean airport

- IATA: none; ICAO: SCIB

Summary
- Airport type: Public
- Serves: Isla Butachauques (es), Chile
- Elevation AMSL: 150 ft (46 m)
- Coordinates: 42°18′35″S 73°08′30″W

Map
- Location of Butachauques Airport in Chile

Runways
Direction	Length		Surface
Direction	m	ft	Surface
14/32	705	2,313	Grass
- Source: Landings.com Google Maps GCM

Butachauques Airport (ICAO: SCIB) is an airport serving Isla Butachauques (es), a central island in the Gulf of Ancud in Chile's Los Lagos Region.

The runway is on the western side of the island, and approach and departures are partially over the water.

== See also ==
- Transport in Chile
- List of airports in Chile
