= Pedro de Valdivia Airport =

- IATA: none; ICAO: SCPD

Summary
- Airport type: Public
- Serves: María Elena, Chile
- Elevation AMSL: 4,640 ft / 1,414 m
- Coordinates: 22°34′25″S 69°40′05″W

Map
- Location of Pedro de Valdivia Airport in Chile

Runways
Direction	Length		Surface
Direction	m	ft	Surface
10/28	1,175	3,855	Dirt
16/34	1,105	3,625	Dirt
- Source: Landings.com Google Maps

Pedro de Valdivia Airport (Spanish: Aeropuerto Pedro de Valdivia), (ICAO: SCPD) is an airport serving María Elena, a saltpeter mining facility in the Antofagasta Region of Chile.

== See also ==
- Transport in Chile
- List of airports in Chile
