= Mansel Airport =

- IATA: none; ICAO: ~~SCMN~~

Summary
- Airport type: Closed
- Serves: Paine, Chile
- Elevation AMSL: 1,411 ft / 430 m
- Coordinates: 33°51′47″S 70°46′15″W

Map
- Location of closed Mansel Airport in Chile

Runways
Direction	Length		Surface
Direction	ft	m	Surface
Closed
- Source: Google Maps OurAirports

Mansel Airport (Spanish: Aeropuerto de Paine Mansel, (ICAO: ~~SCMN~~) is a former airport 6 kilometres (4 mi) south-southwest of Paine, a city in the Santiago Metropolitan Region of Chile.

Google Earth Historical Imagery (2/28/2010) shows the airport was converted to agricultural use after 2010.

The "SCMN" ICAO code has been reassigned to Mónaco Airport.

== See also ==
- Transport in Chile
- List of airports in Chile
