= Fray Jorge Airport =

- IATA: none; ICAO: SCFJ

Summary
- Airport type: Public
- Serves: Ovalle
- Elevation AMSL: 492 ft / 150 m
- Coordinates: 30°40′50″S 71°34′40″W

Map
- Location of Fray Jorge Airport in Chile

Runways
Direction	Length		Surface
Direction	m	ft	Surface
15/33	453	1,486	Grass
06/24	325	1,066	Grass
- Source: Landings.com Google Maps

Fray Jorge Airport (Spanish: Aeropuerto Fray Jorge), (ICAO: SCFJ) is an airstrip 37 kilometres (23 mi) west of Ovalle, a city in the Coquimbo Region of Chile.

The airstrip is on a low ridge 1.2 kilometres (0.7 mi) above the Limarí River, with ravine dropoffs on all sides. Terrain rises to the west.

== See also ==
- Transport in Chile
- List of airports in Chile
