= Almahue Airport =

- IATA: none; ICAO: SCHG

Summary
- Airport type: Private
- Serves: Pichidegua, Chile
- Elevation AMSL: 420 ft / 128 m
- Coordinates: 34°23′55″S 71°22′20″W

Map
- Location of Almahue Airport in Chile

Runways
Direction	Length		Surface
Direction	m	ft	Surface
10/28	600	1,969	Grass
- Source: GCM Google Maps

Almahue Airport Spanish: Aeropuerto Almahue, (ICAO: SCHG) is an airport 9 kilometres (5.6 mi) southwest of Pichidegua, a town in the O'Higgins Region of Chile.

There are hills north and east of the airport.

== See also ==
- Transport in Chile
- List of airports in Chile
