= Pisagua Airport =

- IATA: none; ICAO: SCPS

Summary
- Airport type: Public
- Serves: Pisagua, Chile
- Elevation AMSL: 1,260 ft / 384 m
- Coordinates: 19°36′05″S 70°11′52″W

Map
- Location of Pisagua Airport in Chile

Runways
Direction	Length		Surface
Direction	m	ft	Surface
01/19	945	3,100	Dirt
- Source: Landings.com Google Maps

Pisagua Airport (Spanish: Aeropuerto de Pisagua), (ICAO: SCPS) is an airstrip 2 kilometres (1 mi) east of the Pacific coastal village of Pisagua, in the Tarapacá Region of Chile.

The airstrip sits on a mesa high above the village. To the east, rising terrain is present, and to the west, the Pacific steeply drops. The runway end markers are well outside the graded runway, which extends substantially beyond the markers at either end.

Some sources have the ICAO code "SCPS" for the closed Perales Airport in the Atacama Region.

== See also ==
- Transport in Chile
- List of airports in Chile
