= La Escondida Airport =

- IATA: none; ICAO: SCLE

Summary
- Airport type: Private
- Owner: Minera Escondida Ltda
- Serves: Minera Escondida
- Elevation AMSL: 10,289 ft / 3,136 m
- Coordinates: 24°17′40″S 69°07′45″W

Map
- Location of La Escondida Airport in Chile

Runways
Direction	Length		Surface
Direction	m	ft	Surface
10/28	2,400	7,874	Dirt
- Source: GCM Google Maps

La Escondida Airport (Spanish: Aeropuerto La Escondida, (ICAO: SCLE)) is a high elevation airstrip serving the Minera Escondida copper mines in the Antofagasta Region of Chile.

The runway has an over 120 metres (390 ft) upslope to the east. There is rising terrain north and south of the runway.

== See also ==
- Transport in Chile
- List of airports in Chile
