= Rucalonco Airport =

Airport in Chile

- IATA: none; ICAO: SCRW

Summary
- Airport type: Private
- Serves: Paredones, Chile
- Elevation AMSL: 240 ft / 73 m
- Coordinates: 34°33′10″S 72°02′50″W

Map
- Location of Rucalonco Airport in Chile

Runways
Direction	Length		Surface
Direction	m	ft	Surface
03/21	918	3,012	Grass
- Source: Landings.com Google Maps GCM

Rucalonco Airport (Spanish: Aeropuerto de Rucalonco) (ICAO: SCRW) is an airport serving the Paredones commune in the O'Higgins Region of Chile.

The airport is on the Pacific coast, 18 kilometres (11 mi) down the coast from Pichilemu. The runway slope rises to the northeast. Southwest approach and departure are over the water.

== See also ==
- Transport in Chile
- List of airports in Chile
