= Juan Enrique Airport =

- IATA: none; ICAO: SCAU

Summary
- Airport type: Public
- Serves: Paine, Chile
- Elevation AMSL: 1,263 ft / 385 m
- Coordinates: 33°53′35″S 70°53′07″W

Map
- Location of Juan Enrique Airport in Chile

Runways
Direction	Length		Surface
Direction	m	ft	Surface
18/36	594	1,949	Grass
- Source: Landings.com Google Maps GCM

Juan Enrique Airport Spanish: Aeropuerto de Juan Enrique, (ICAO: SCAU) is an airport 16 kilometres (10 mi) west-southwest of Paine, a city in the Santiago Metropolitan Region of Chile.

The airport is on an alluvial slope running north from mountain peaks to the south. Mountainous ridges run from the south to both east and west of the runway.

The Talagante non-directional beacon (Ident: TAL) is located 12.9 nautical miles (23.9 km) north of the airport.

== See also ==
- Transport in Chile
- List of airports in Chile
