= La Colmena Airport =

La Colmena Airport Traiguén Quino La Colmena Airport
- IATA: none; ICAO: SCQC

Summary
- Airport type: Public
- Serves: Traiguén, Chile
- Elevation AMSL: 823 ft / 251 m
- Coordinates: 38°20′05″S 72°35′15″W

Map
- Location of La Colmena Airport in Chile

Runways
Direction	Length		Surface
Direction	m	ft	Surface
03/21	720	2,362	Grass
- Source: Landings.com Google Maps GCM

La Colmena Airport (Spanish: Aeropuerto de Traiguén Quino La Colmena), (ICAO: SCQC) is an airport 12 kilometres (7.5 mi) southeast of Traiguén, a town in the La Araucanía Region of Chile.

== See also ==
- Transport in Chile
- List of airports in Chile
