= Palo Alto Airport (Lolol) =

- IATA: none; ICAO: SCAO

Summary
- Airport type: Public
- Serves: Lolol, Chile
- Elevation AMSL: 279 ft / 85 m
- Coordinates: 34°43′57″S 71°44′30″W

Map
- Location of Palo Alto Airport in Chile

Runways
Direction	Length		Surface
Direction	m	ft	Surface
08/26	825	2,707	Grass
- Source: Landings.com Google Maps GCM

Palo Alto Airport (Spanish: Aeropuerto de Palo Alto), (ICAO: SCAO) is an airport 8 kilometres (5.0 mi) west of Lolol, a town in the O'Higgins Region of Chile.

== See also ==
- Transport in Chile
- List of airports in Chile
