= La Reforma Airport =

- IATA: none; ICAO: SCFO

Summary
- Airport type: Private
- Serves: Pelarco, Chile
- Elevation AMSL: 853 ft / 260 m
- Coordinates: 35°27′30″S 71°16′50″W

Map
- Location of La Reforma Airport in Chile

Runways
Direction	Length		Surface
Direction	m	ft	Surface
11/29	600	1,969	Grass
- Source: GCM Google Maps

La Reforma Airport (Spanish: Aeropuerto La Reforma, (ICAO: SCFO)) is a rural airstrip 33 kilometres (21 mi) east of Talca, in the Maule Region of Chile.

There are nearby hills to the northwest, and distant hills to the southeast.

== See also ==
- Transport in Chile
- List of airports in Chile
