= Arquilhue Airport =

- IATA: none; ICAO: SCAQ

Summary
- Airport type: Private
- Serves: Llifén, Chile
- Location: Arquilhue
- Elevation AMSL: 590 ft / 180 m
- Coordinates: 40°11′54″S 72°01′50″W

Map
- Location of Arquilhue Airport in Chile

Runways
Direction	Length		Surface
Direction	m	ft	Surface
09/27	847	2,779	Grass
- Source: Landings.com Google Maps GCM

Arquilhue Airport Spanish: Aeropuerto Arquilhue, (ICAO: SCAQ) is an airstrip at Arquilhue, a village in the Los Ríos Region of Chile. Arquilhue is 20 kilometres (12 mi) east of Llifén.

The runway has an additional 100 metres (330 ft) of unpaved overrun on the east end.

There is mountainous terrain southwest through northwest of the airstrip, and rising terrain in other quadrants.

== See also ==
- Transport in Chile
- List of airports in Chile
