= Aucó Airport =

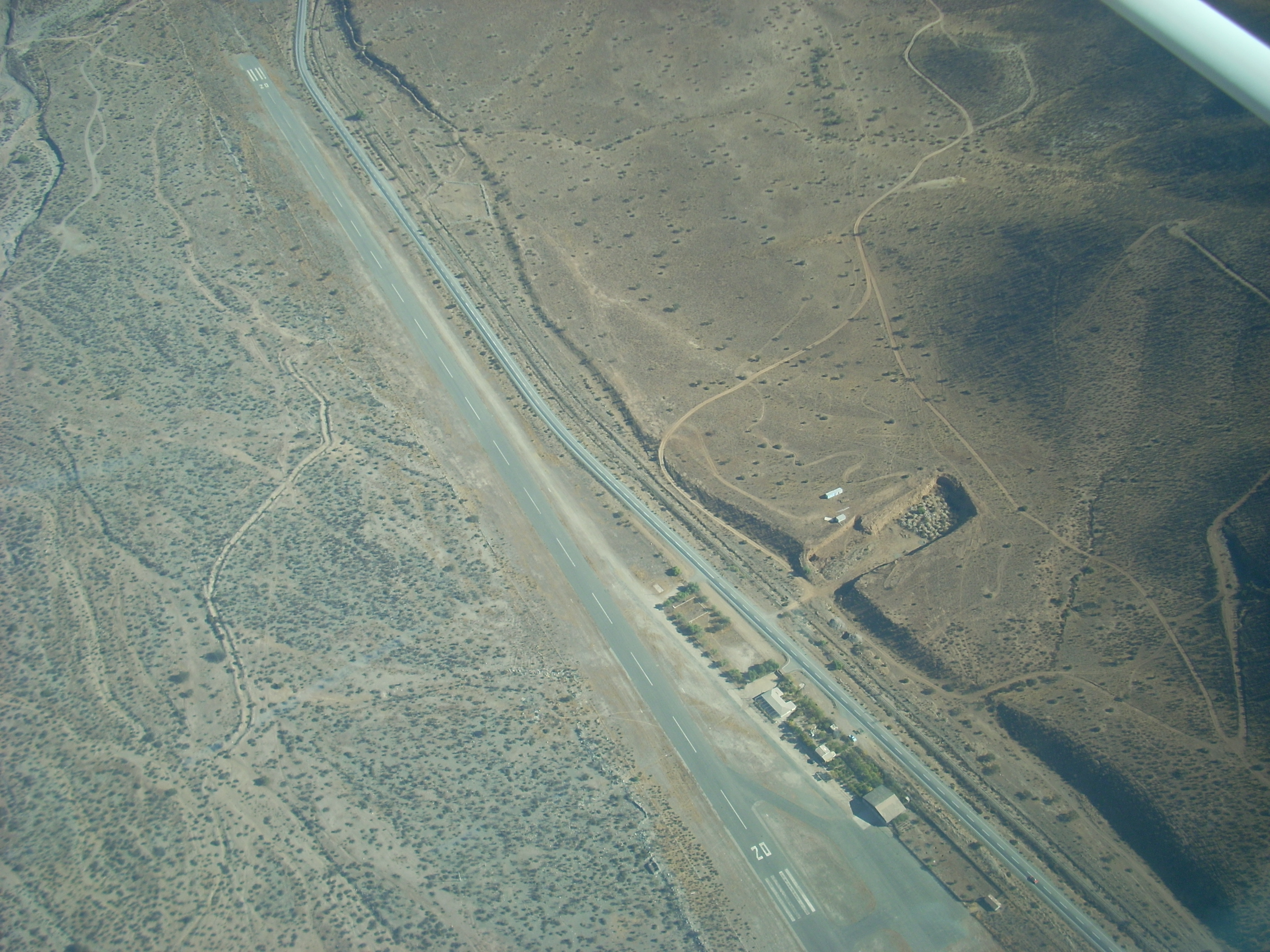
- IATA: none; ICAO: SCIL

Summary
- Airport type: Public
- Serves: Illapel, Chile
- Elevation AMSL: 1,420 ft / 433 m
- Coordinates: 31°34′40″S 71°06′39″W

Map
- Location of Aucó Airport in Chile

Runways
Direction	Length		Surface
Direction	m	ft	Surface
02/20	1,201	3,940	Asphalt

Helipads
Number	Length		Surface
Number	m	ft	Surface
1	27	89	Asphalt
- Source: Landings.com Google Maps GCM

Aucó Airport Spanish: Aeropuerto de Aucó, (ICAO: SCIL) is an airport 8 kilometres (5.0 mi) northeast of Illapel, a city in the Coquimbo Region of Chile.

The runway is in a valley with low mountains in all quadrants, and nearby hills to the northwest.

== See also ==
- Transport in Chile
- List of airports in Chile
