= El Manso Airport =

El Manso Airport Aeropuerto El Manso
- IATA: none; ICAO: SCGR

Summary
- Airport type: Public
- Serves: Llanada Grande
- Location: Chile
- Elevation AMSL: 1,296 ft / 395 m
- Coordinates: 41°44′32.9″S 071°54′36.6″W

Map
- Location of El Manso Airport in Chile

Runways
| Direction | Length | | Surface |
| Direction | ft | m | Surface |
|---|---|---|---|
| 12/30 | 1,820 | 555 | Grass |
- Source: Landings.com

El Manso Airport (Spanish: Aeropuerto El Manso, ICAO: SCGR) is a public use airport located near Llanada Grande, Los Lagos, Chile.

== See also ==
- Talk:El Manso Airport
- List of airports in Chile
