= James Conrad Airport =

- IATA: none; ICAO: SCJC

Summary
- Airport type: Public
- Serves: Ranguelmo (es), Chile
- Elevation AMSL: 528 ft / 161 m
- Coordinates: 36°34′50″S 72°46′25″W

Map
- Location of James Conrad Airport in Chile

Runways
Direction	Length		Surface
Direction	m	ft	Surface
07/25	530	1,739	Dirt
- Source: Landings.com Google Maps

James Conrad Airport (Spanish: Aeropuerto James Conrad), (ICAO: SCJC) is an airstrip serving Ranguelmo (es), a forest products town in the Bío Bío Region of Chile.

The runway sits on a low ridge just west of the town. There is hilly terrain in all quadrants.

== See also ==
- Transport in Chile
- List of airports in Chile
