= Parron Airport =

- IATA: none; ICAO: ~~SCRO~~

Summary
- Airport type: Public
- Serves: Parron
- Location: Chile
- Elevation AMSL: 1,420 ft / 433 m
- Coordinates: 34°57′31.6″S 71°10′47.4″W

Map
- Location of Parron Airport in Chile

Runways
Direction	Length		Surface
Direction	ft	m	Surface
02/20	770	235	Grass
- Source: Landings.com

Parron Airport (ICAO: ~~SCRO~~) is a public use airport located near Parron, Maule, Chile.

== See also ==
- Talk:Parron Airport
- List of airports in Chile
