= Villa Portales Airport =

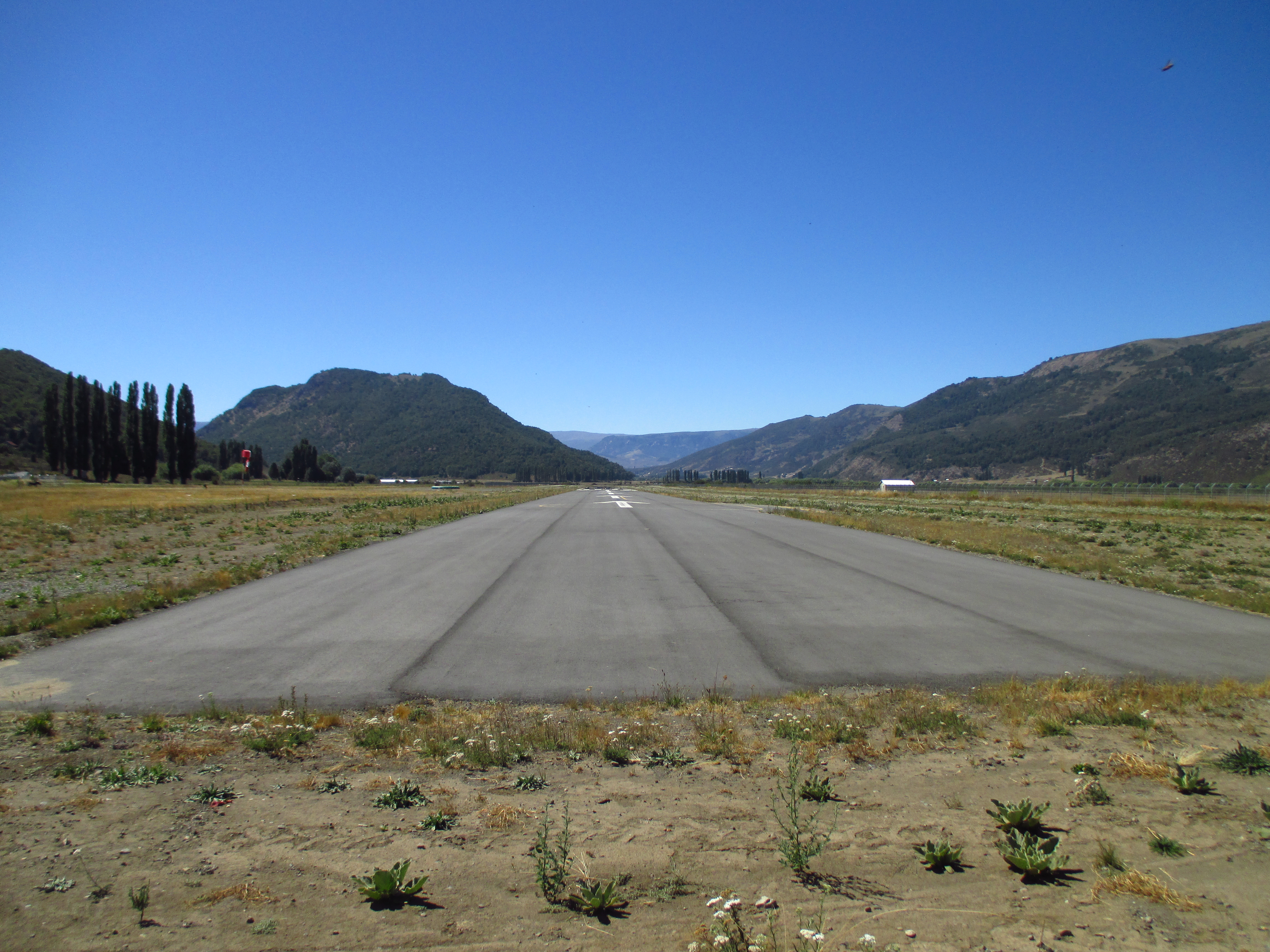
- Runway 09 (facing east)
- IATA: none; ICAO: SCQY

Summary
- Airport type: Public
- Serves: Lonquimay, Chile
- Elevation AMSL: 3,182 ft / 970 m
- Coordinates: 38°26′55″S 71°21′25″W

Map
- Location of Villa Portales Airport in Chile

Runways
Direction	Length		Surface
Direction	m	ft	Surface
08/26	940	3,084	Asphalt
- Source: Landings.com Google maps GCM

Villa Portales Airport (Spanish: Aeropuerto Villa Portales), (ICAO: SCQY) is an airport 1 kilometre (0.62 mi) east-northeast of Lonquimay, a town in the Araucanía Region of Chile.

The airport is in the Andean valley of the Lonquimay River. There is mountainous terrain in all quadrants.

== See also ==
- Transport in Chile
- List of airports in Chile
