= Añorada Airport =

- IATA: none; ICAO: SCAA

Summary
- Airport type: Defunct
- Serves: Frutillar, Chile
- Elevation AMSL: 459 ft / 140 m
- Coordinates: 41°02′35″S 73°02′51″W

Map
- Location of Añorada Airport in Chile
- Source: FallingRain Google Maps

Añorada Airport (ICAO: SCAA) was a rural airstrip 8 kilometres (5.0 mi) north of Frutillar, a town in the Los Lagos Region of Chile.

Google Earth Historical Imagery (4/6/2010) and subsequent show a former 900 metres (3,000 ft) grass strip now with an agricultural processing facility and a stock pond built on it.

== See also ==
- Transport in Chile
- List of airports in Chile
