= Marimenuco Airfield =

- IATA: none; ICAO: SCNU

Summary
- Airport type: Closed
- Serves: Marimenuco
- Coordinates: 38°44′21″S 71°12′06″W

Map
- Location of Marimenuco Airfield in Chile

Runways
Direction	Length		Surface
Direction	ft	m	Surface
Closed
- Source: Landings.com

Marimenuco Airfield (Spanish: Aeródromo Marimenuco, (ICAO: SCNU)) was an airstrip 9 kilometres (6 mi) west-southwest of Marimenuco, a hamlet in the Araucanía Region of Chile.

Google Earth Historical Imagery shows a north–south power line crossing midfield since at least (5/1/2008).

== See also ==
- Transport in Chile
- List of airports in Chile
