= San Andrés Airport =

- IATA: none; ICAO: SCDS

Summary
- Airport type: Public
- Serves: Retiro
- Elevation AMSL: 574 ft / 175 m
- Coordinates: 35°59′47″S 71°46′10″W

Map
- Location of Retiro San Andrés Airport in Chile

Runways
Direction	Length		Surface
Direction	m	ft	Surface
05/23	595	1,952	Grass
- Source: Landings.com Google Maps GCM

San Andrés Airport (Spanish: Aeropuerto San Andrés, (ICAO: SCDS)) is an airport 6 kilometres (3.7 mi) north of Retiro, a town in the Maule Region of Chile.

== See also ==
- Transport in Chile
- List of airports in Chile
