= Las Alpacas Airport =

- IATA: none; ICAO: SCAJ

Summary
- Airport type: Public
- Serves: Parral, Chile
- Elevation AMSL: 550 ft / 168 m
- Coordinates: 36°08′43″S 71°45′50″W

Map
- Location of Las Alpacas Airport in Chile

Runways
Direction	Length		Surface
Direction	m	ft	Surface
02/20	535	1,755	Grass
- Source: Landings.com Google Maps GCM

Las Alpacas Airport (Spanish: Aeropuerto Las Alpacas, (ICAO: SCAJ)) is a small airport serving Parral, a city in the Maule Region of Chile. The runway is 5 kilometres (3.1 mi) east of Parral.

== See also ==
- Transport in Chile
- List of airports in Chile
