= Rucamanqui Airport =

Airport in Chile

- IATA: none; ICAO: SCHE

Summary
- Airport type: Public
- Serves: Huépil (es), Chile
- Elevation AMSL: 1,132 ft / 345 m
- Coordinates: 37°12′00″S 71°53′46″W

Map
- Location of Rucamanqui Airport in Chile

Runways
Direction	Length		Surface
Direction	m	ft	Surface
01/19	1,012	3,320	Grass
- Source: Landings.com Google Maps GCM

Rucamanqui Airport (Spanish: Aeropuerto Rucamanqui) (ICAO: SCHE) is an airport 6 kilometres (3.7 mi) northeast of Huépil (es), a town in the Bío Bío Region of Chile.

The Los Angeles VOR (Ident: MAD) is 28.1 nautical miles (52.0 km) west-southwest of the airport.

== See also ==
- Transport in Chile
- List of airports in Chile
