= Tongoy Airport =

- IATA: none; ICAO: SCTG

Summary
- Airport type: Defunct
- Serves: Tongoy, Chile
- Elevation AMSL: 49 ft / 15 m
- Coordinates: 30°15′59″S 71°29′02″W

Map
- Location of Tongoy Airport in Chile

Runways
Direction	Length		Surface
Direction	ft	m	Surface
Closed
- Source: GCM Landings.com Google Maps

Tongoy Airport Spanish: Aeropuerto de Tongoy, (ICAO: SCTG) was an airstrip serving Tongoy, a Pacific coastal town in the Coquimbo Region of Chile.

The airport is closed.

The Tongoy non-directional beacon (Ident: TOY) is located on the field. The Tongoy VOR-DME (Ident: TOY) is located 0.7 nautical miles (1.3 km) southeast of the runway.

== See also ==
- Transport in Chile
- List of airports in Chile
