= Alempue Airport =

- IATA: none; ICAO: ~~SCAM~~

Summary
- Airport type: Closed
- Serves: Teno, Chile
- Elevation AMSL: 1,083 ft / 330 m
- Coordinates: 34°51′55″S 71°06′00″W

Map
- Location of Alempue Airport in Chile

Runways
Direction	Length		Surface
Direction	ft	m	Surface
Closed
- Source: Google Maps

Alempue Airport (Spanish: Aeropuerto de Alempue, (ICAO: ~~SCAM~~)) was an airport serving Teno, a city in the Maule Region of Chile.

Google Earth Historical Imagery (1/3/2015) shows a well marked 778 metres (2,552 ft) grass runway. (12/7/2015) imagery shows the runway markings removed and the area plowed for crops. Drainage has been cut across the northwest portion of the field.

== See also ==
- Transport in Chile
- List of airports in Chile
