= Río Murta Airport =

Airport in Chile

- IATA: none; ICAO: SCRU

Summary
- Airport type: Public
- Serves: Puerto Murta, Chile
- Elevation AMSL: 600 ft / 183 m
- Coordinates: 46°27′20″S 72°40′35″W

Map
- Location of Río Murta Airport in Chile

Runways
Direction	Length		Surface
Direction	m	ft	Surface
17/35	760	2,493	Grass
- Source: Landings.com Google Maps GCM

Río Murta Airport (ICAO: SCRU) is an airport serving Puerto Murta (es), a village in the Aysén Region of Chile. The airport and village are at the north end of an arm of General Carrera Lake.

There is mountainous terrain immediately east of the airport. Approaches from the south are over the water.

== See also ==
- Transport in Chile
- List of airports in Chile
