= Esperanza Airport (Chile) =

- IATA: none; ICAO: SCLS

Summary
- Airport type: Private
- Serves: Lautaro, Chile
- Location: Chile
- Elevation AMSL: 1,230 ft / 375 m
- Coordinates: 38°32′55″S 72°08′50″W

Map
- Location of Esperanza Airport in Chile

Runways
Direction	Length		Surface
Direction	m	ft	Surface
01/19	567	1,860	Grass
- Source: Landings.com Google Maps GCM

Esperanza Airport Spanish: Aeropuerto Esperanza, (ICAO: SCLS) is a rural airport 25 kilometres (16 mi) east of Lautaro, a city in the Araucanía Region of Chile.

== See also ==
- Transport in Chile
- List of airports in Chile
