= Viñasutil Airport =

Airport near Peralillo, O'Higgins, Chile

Viñasutil Airport Aeródromo Viña Sutil
- IATA: none; ICAO: SCSV

Summary
- Airport type: Private
- Owner: Viña Sutil S. A.
- Serves: Peralillo
- Elevation AMSL: 427 ft / 130 m
- Coordinates: 34°26′55″S 71°23′10″W

Map
- Location of Viñasutil Airport in Chile

Runways
Direction	Length		Surface
Direction	m	ft	Surface
15/33	690	2,264	Gravel
- Sources: GCM Google Maps

Viñasutil Airport (Spanish: Aeródromo Viña Sutil, (ICAO: SCSV)) is an airport serving the Viña Sutil winery, 9 kilometres (5.6 mi) east of Peralillo, a town in the O'Higgins Region of Chile.

== See also ==
- Transport in Chile
- List of airports in Chile
- Aeródromo Viña Sutil Spanish Wikipedia
