= San Alfonso Airport =

- IATA: none; ICAO: SCAF

Summary
- Airport type: Closed
- Serves: Alhué, Chile
- Elevation AMSL: 407 ft / 124 m
- Coordinates: 34°3′37″S 71°15′11″W

Map
- Location of San Alfonso Airport in Chile

Runways
Direction	Length		Surface
Direction	ft	m	Surface
Closed
- Source: Landings.com Google Maps

San Alfonso Airport (Spanish: Aeropuerto de San Alfonso, (ICAO: SCAF)) was a rural airstrip 14 kilometres (8.7 mi) west of Alhué, a town in the Santiago Metropolitan Region of Chile.

Google Earth Historical Imagery (9/11/2014) shows a 714 metres (2,343 ft) grass runway. The (3/18/2016) and subsequent imagery show the runway plowed and cropped.

== See also ==
- Transport in Chile
- List of airports in Chile
