= Lolco Airport =

Airport in Chile

- IATA: none; ICAO: SCCU

Summary
- Airport type: Private
- Serves: Lonquimay, Chile
- Elevation AMSL: 2,132 ft / 650 m
- Coordinates: 38°09′30″S 71°25′29″W

Map
- Location of Lolco Airport in Chile

Runways
Direction	Length		Surface
Direction	m	ft	Surface
02/20	1,006	3,301	Grass
- Source: Landings.com Google Maps GCM

Lolco Airport Spanish: Aeropuerto Lolco, (ICAO: SCCU) is an airstrip in the eastern mountains of the La Araucanía Region of Chile. The airstrip is on the Lolco River, a small tributary of Ralco Lake. It is 33 kilometres (21 mi) west of the Argentina border.

There is rising and mountainous terrain in all quadrants.

== See also ==
- Transport in Chile
- List of airports in Chile
