= Víctor Lafón Airport =

Airport in Valparaíso Region, Chile

Victor Lafón Airport Aeropuerto Victor Lafón
- IATA: SSD; ICAO: SCSF

Summary
- Airport type: Public
- Serves: San Felipe, Chile
- Elevation AMSL: 2,158 ft / 658 m
- Coordinates: 32°44′45″S 70°42′18″W

Map
- Location of Victor Lafón Airport in Chile

Runways
Direction	Length		Surface
Direction	m	ft	Surface
16/34	1,150	3,773	Grass
- Sources: Landings.com Google Maps GCM

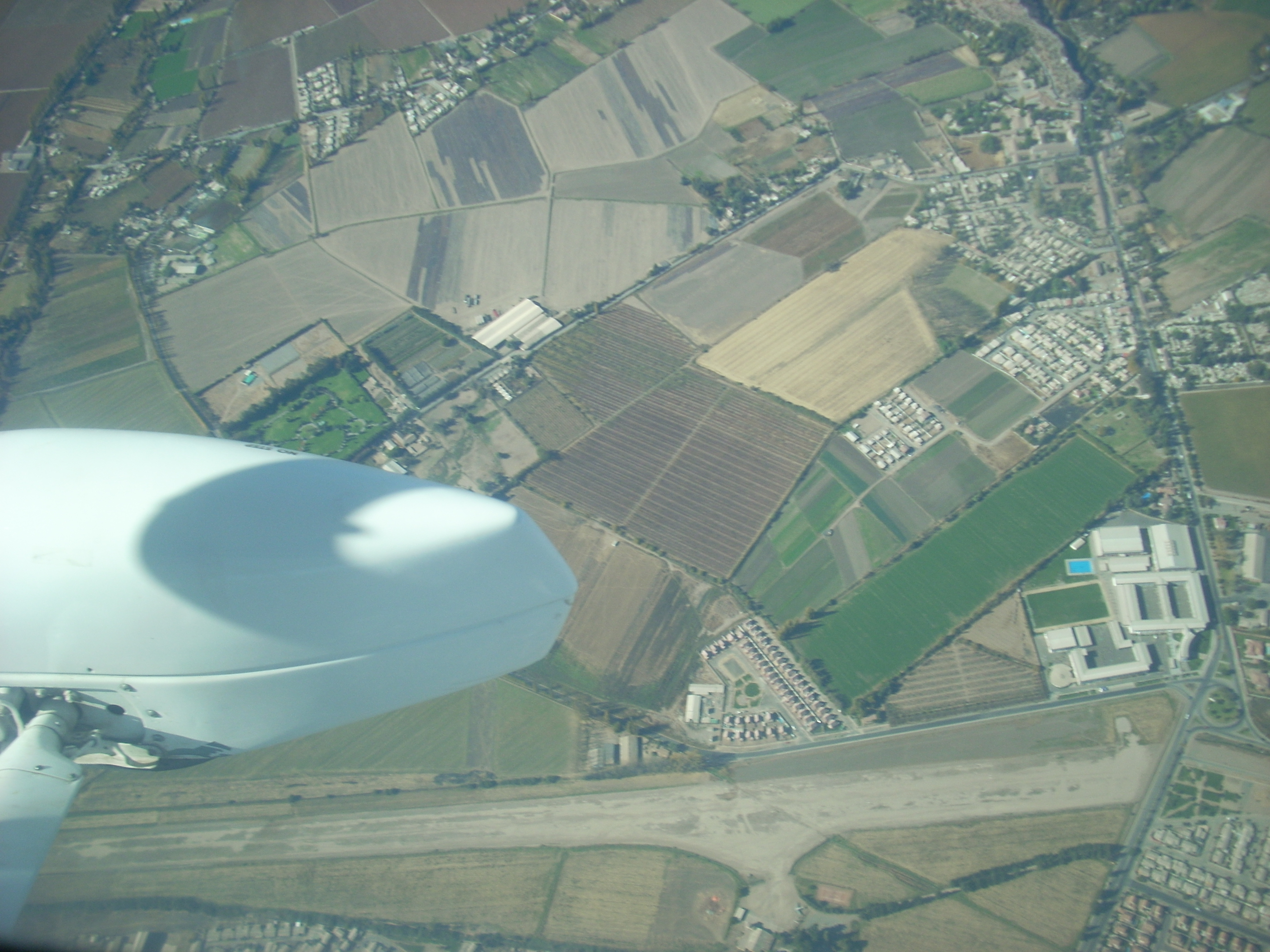

Victor Lafón Airport (Spanish: Aeropuerto Victor Lafón) (IATA: SSD, ICAO: SCSF) is an airport serving San Felipe, a city in the Valparaíso Region of Chile.

The airport is adjacent to the northeast side of the city. There is rising and mountainous terrain in all quadrants except southeast.

== See also ==
- Transport in Chile
- List of airports in Chile
