= Santo Domingo Airfield (Chile) =

Airport in Valparaíso Region, Chile

Santo Domingo Airport
- IATA: none; ICAO: SCSN

Summary
- Airport type: Public
- Serves: Santo Domingo, Chile
- Elevation AMSL: 245 ft / 75 m
- Coordinates: 33°39′23″S 71°36′55″W

Map
- Location of Santo Domingo Airfield in Chile

Runways
Direction	Length		Surface
Direction	m	ft	Surface
05/23	800	2,625	Asphalt
- Sources: Landings.com Google Maps GCM

Santo Domingo Airport (Spanish: Aeródromo Santo Domingo, (ICAO: SCSN)) is an airport serving Santo Domingo, a Pacific coastal town in the Valparaíso Region of Chile.

The Santo Domingo VOR-DME (Ident:SNO) and non-directional beacon (Ident:SNO) are located on the field.

== See also ==
- Transport in Chile
- List of airports in Chile
