= Lago Colico Airport =

- IATA: none; ICAO: SCLK

Summary
- Airport type: Private
- Serves: Cunco, Chile
- Elevation AMSL: 1,148 ft / 350 m
- Coordinates: 39°3′25″S 72°04′35″W

Map
- Location of Lago Colico Airport in Chile

Runways
Direction	Length		Surface
Direction	m	ft	Surface
11/29	762	2,500	Grass
- Source: Landings.com Google Maps GCM

Lago Colico Airport (ICAO: SCLK) is a rural airstrip at the west end of Colico Lake in the Araucanía Region of Chile. The nearest town is Cunco, 14 kilometres (8.7 mi) to the north.

East approach and departure are over the water.

== See also ==
- Transport in Chile
- List of airports in Chile
