= Isla Picton Airport =

Airport in Chile

- IATA: none; ICAO: SCPO

Summary
- Airport type: Public
- Serves: Quinta de Tilcoco, Chile
- Elevation AMSL: 869 ft / 265 m
- Coordinates: 34°19′40″S 70°57′50″W

Map
- Location of Isla Picton Airport in Chile

Runways
Direction	Length		Surface
Direction	m	ft	Surface
02/20	500	1,640	Grass/asphalt
- Source: Landings.com Google Maps GCM

Isla Picton Airport (Spanish: Aeropuerto Isla Picton), (ICAO: SCPO) is an airport 3 kilometres (1.9 mi) north of Quinta de Tilcoco, a town in the O'Higgins Region of Chile.

The north 275 metres (902 ft) of the centerline is paved 4 metres (13 ft) wide. There are hills nearby east and west, and high terrain to the north.

== See also ==
- Transport in Chile
- List of airports in Chile
