= Segundo Corral Alto Airfield =

- IATA: none; ICAO: SCSR

Summary
- Airport type: Public
- Serves: Segundo Corral, Chile
- Elevation AMSL: 1,200 ft / 366 m
- Coordinates: 42°04′27″S 71°51′50″W

Map
- Location of Segundo Corral Airfield in Chile

Runways
Direction	Length		Surface
Direction	m	ft	Surface
07/25	740	2,428	Grass
- Sources: Landings.com Google Maps GCM

Segundo Corral Alto Airfield (Spanish: Aeródromo Segundo Corral Alto, (ICAO: SCSR)) is an airport serving Segundo Corral (es), a mountain resort in the Los Lagos Region of Chile.

The runway has an additional 280 metres (920 ft) overrun on the west end. It is 3 kilometres (1.9 mi) up the valley from the north end of Lake Inferior (sv), and 11 kilometres (6.8 mi) from the border with Argentina. The nearest community is Lago Puelo in Argentina.

There is mountainous terrain in all quadrants. Approach and departure are terrain limited.

== See also ==
- Transport in Chile
- List of airports in Chile
