= Sandra Scabini Airport =

- IATA: none; ICAO: SCNS

Summary
- Airport type: Defunct
- Serves: Punta Arenas, Chile
- Elevation AMSL: 236 ft / 72 m
- Coordinates: 52°23′38″S 69°45′25″W

Map
- Location of Sandra Scabini Airport in Chile

Runways
Direction	Length		Surface
Direction	ft	m	Surface
Closed
- Source: Google Maps

Sandra Scabini Airport (Spanish: Aeropuerto de Sandra Scabini), (ICAO: SCNS) was an airstrip 115 kilometres (71 mi) northeast of Punta Arenas, the capital of the Magallanes Region of Chile.

In 2009, oil and gas was discovered around the Strait of Magellan, and the airstrip was near the center of the fields. Google Earth Historical Imagery from September 2004 shows a well-marked 510 metres (1,670 ft) dirt runway. The March 2013 image and later imagery have the runway in use as a storage area for oil and gas drilling equipment.

== See also ==
- Transport in Chile
- List of airports in Chile
