= Pampa Alegre Aerodrome =

Pampa Alegre Aerodrome Aeródromo de Pampa Alegre
- IATA: none; ICAO: SCOS

Summary
- Airport type: Public
- Serves: Osorno
- Location: Chile
- Elevation AMSL: 78 ft / 24 m
- Coordinates: 40°32′51.9″S 073°9′59.8″W

Map
- Location of Pampa Alegre Aerodrome in Chile

Runways
Direction	Length		Surface
Direction	ft	m	Surface
13/31	1,010	308	Grass
- Source: Landings.com

Pampa Alegre Aerodrome (ICAO: SCOS) is a public use airport located 25 kilometres (16 mi) northwest of Osorno, Los Lagos, Chile.

== See also ==
- List of airports in Chile
