= San Lorenzo Airport (Chile) =

- IATA: none; ICAO: SCDQ

Summary
- Airport type: Private
- Location: Duqueco, Chile
- Elevation AMSL: 1,902 ft / 580 m
- Coordinates: 37°31′35″S 71°43′25″W

Map
- Location of San Lorenzo Airport in Chile

Runways
| Direction | Length | | Surface |
| Direction | m | ft | Surface |
|---|---|---|---|
| 14/32 | 1,075 | 3,527 | Grass |
- Source: Landings.com Google Maps GCM

San Lorenzo Airport Spanish: Aeropuerto de San Lorenzo, (ICAO: SCDQ) is an airport 23 kilometres (14 mi) east of Quilleco, a small town in the Bío Bío Region of Chile. The airport is in the valley of the Duqueco River, near the hamlet of Duqueco. A penstock fed hydroelectric station is 1.6 kilometres (1 mi) east of the airport.

The runway has an additional 175 metres (574 ft) of unpaved overrun on the northwest end. There is rising terrain in all quadrants.

== See also ==
- Transport in Chile
- List of airports in Chile
