= Hospital Villa Baviera Airport =

- IATA: none; ICAO: SCVB

Summary
- Airport type: Public
- Serves: Villa Baviera, Chile
- Elevation AMSL: 1,040 ft (320 m)
- Coordinates: 36°23′55″S 71°33′50″W

Map
- Location of Hospital Villa Baviera Airport in Chile

Runways
Direction	Length		Surface
Direction	m	ft	Surface
12/30	697	2,287	Grass
- Source: Landings.com Google Maps GCM

Hospital Villa Baviera Airport (Spanish: Aeropuerto de Hospital Villa Baviera), (ICAO: SCVB) is an airport serving Villa Baviera, a village in the Maule Region of Chile.

The airport is southeast of Villa Baviera, and runs along the north shore of the Perquilauquén River. There is rising terrain in all quadrants except southwest.

== See also ==
- Transport in Chile
- List of airports in Chile
