= El Boldal Airport =

- IATA: none; ICAO: SCBD

Summary
- Airport type: Private
- Serves: Santa Cruz, Chile
- Location: El Boldal
- Elevation AMSL: 574 ft / 175 m
- Coordinates: 34°40′45″S 71°17′10″W

Map
- Location of Santa Cruz El Boldal Airport in Chile

Runways
Direction	Length		Surface
Direction	m	ft	Surface
11/29	870	2,854	Grass
- Sources: GCM Google Maps

El Boldal Airport (ICAO: SCBD) is an airport serving Santa Cruz, a city in the O'Higgins Region of Chile. The airport is near El Boldal, a village 6 kilometres (3.7 mi) southeast of Santa Cruz.

== See also ==
- Transport in Chile
- List of airports in Chile
