= Linares Airport =

Airport in Chile

- IATA: ZLR; ICAO: SCLN

Summary
- Airport type: Public
- Serves: Linares, Chile
- Elevation AMSL: 587 ft / 179 m
- Coordinates: 35°51′40″S 71°32′52″W

Map
- Location of Linares Airport in Chile

Runways
Direction	Length		Surface
Direction	m	ft	Surface
01/19	1,200	3,937	Grass
- Source: Landings.com Google Maps GCM

Linares Airport Spanish: Aeropuerto de Linares, (IATA: ZLR, ICAO: SCLN) is an airport serving Linares, a city in the Maule Region of Chile. The airport is 3 kilometres (1.9 mi) east of the city.

== See also ==
- Transport in Chile
- List of airports in Chile
