= María Elena Airport =

- IATA: none; ICAO: SCNE

Summary
- Airport type: Defunct
- Serves: María Elena
- Elevation AMSL: 4,003 ft / 1,220 m
- Coordinates: 22°18′12″S 69°42′20″W

Map
- Location of María Elena Airport in Chile

Runways
Direction	Length		Surface
Direction	ft	m	Surface
Closed
- Source: Google Maps

María Elena Airport (ICAO: SCNE) was an airstrip 7 kilometres (4 mi) northwest of María Elena, a mining town in the Antofagasta Region of Chile.

Google Earth Historical Imagery (12/24/2014) shows a "closed" marker (a large "X") placed in the middle of the runway, and another marker on the access road leading to the runway. The markers are not there in the earlier (3/12/2010) image.

== See also ==
- Transport in Chile
- List of airports in Chile
