= Almirante Schroeders Airport =

- IATA: none; ICAO: SCDW

Summary
- Airport type: Military
- Serves: Isla Dawson
- Elevation AMSL: 160 ft / 49 m
- Coordinates: 53°36′40″S 70°28′15″W

Map
- Location of Almirante Schoeders Airport in Chile

Runways
Direction	Length		Surface
Direction	m	ft	Surface
04/22	1,200	3,937	Compacted gravel
12/30	1,495	4,905	Compacted gravel
- Source: AIP Chile

Almirante Schroeders Airport (Spanish: Aeropuerto de Almirante Schroeders, ICAO: SCDW) is a military airport on the northern point of Isla Dawson, an island midway through the Strait of Magellan in the Magallanes y Antártica Chilena Region of Chile.

The crossing runways are just inland from the island's eastern shore, and approach and departures are over the water.

The Punta Arenas VOR-DME (Ident: NAS) is located 39 nautical miles (72.2 km) north-northwest of the airport.

== See also ==
- Transport in Chile
- List of airports in Chile
