= San Carlos Santa Marta Airport =

Santa Marta Airport
- IATA: none; ICAO: SCKA

Summary
- Airport type: Public
- Serves: San Carlos, Chile
- Elevation AMSL: 577 ft / 176 m
- Coordinates: 36°29′26″S 71°53′25″W

Map
- Location of San Carlos Santa Marta Airport in Chile

Runways
Direction	Length		Surface
Direction	m	ft	Surface
06/24	605	1,985	Grass
- Source: Landings.com Google Maps GCM

Santa Marta Airport (ICAO: SCKA) is an airstrip 10 kilometres (6 mi) southeast of San Carlos, a town in the Bío Bío Region of Chile.

The Chillan VOR-DME (Ident: CHI) is located 8.9 nautical miles (16.5 km) southwest of the airstrip.

== See also ==
- Transport in Chile
- List of airports in Chile
