= Los Tricahues Airport =

- IATA: none; ICAO: SCMI

Summary
- Airport type: Public
- Serves: Mialqui (es), Chile
- Elevation AMSL: 1,650 ft / 503 m
- Coordinates: 30°44′26″S 70°51′55″W

Map
- Location of Los Tricahues Airport in Chile

Runways
Direction	Length		Surface
Direction	m	ft	Surface
13/31	580	1,903	Dirt
- Source: Landings.com Google Maps

Los Tricahues Airport (Spanish: Aeropuerto Los Tricahues), (ICAO: SCMI) is an airport serving Mialqui (es), a village in the Coquimbo Region of Chile.

The airport is in a river valley, and there is nearby high terrain in all quadrants.

== See also ==
- Transport in Chile
- List of airports in Chile
