= Panimávida Airport =

- IATA: none; ICAO: SCIV

Summary
- Airport type: Defunct
- Serves: Panimávida, Chile
- Elevation AMSL: 591 ft / 180 m
- Coordinates: 35°45′40.4″S 071°24′21.9″W

Map
- Location of Panimávida Airport in Chile

Runways
| Direction | Length | | Surface |
| Direction | ft | m | Surface |
|---|---|---|---|
Closed
- Source: Google Maps

Panimávida Airport (ICAO: SCIV) was an airstrip 1 kilometre (0.6 mi) east of Panimávida, a town in the Maule Region of Chile.

Google Earth Historical Imagery (2/7/2006) shows a 597 metres (1,959 ft) grass runway. The (12/13/2010) image and later show the field contour plowed for crops.

== See also ==
- Transport in Chile
- List of airports in Chile
