= Ñochaco Airport =

- IATA: none; ICAO: SCNO

Summary
- Airport type: Public
- Serves: Puerto Octay, Chile
- Location: Ñochaco
- Elevation AMSL: 328 ft / 100 m
- Coordinates: 40°53′37″S 72°52′55″W

Map
- Location of Ñochaco Airport in Chile

Runways
Direction	Length		Surface
Direction	m	ft	Surface
14/32	700	2,297	Grass
- Source: Landings.com Google Maps GCM

Ñochaco Airport (ICAO: SCNO) is an airport serving Puerto Octay in the Los Lagos Region of Chile. Ñochaco is in the countryside 9 kilometres (5.6 mi) north of Puerto Octay.

The runway has 600 metres (2,000 ft) of grass overrun on the south end. The Osorno VOR-DME (Ident: OSO) is 18.4 nautical miles (34.1 km) north-northwest of the airport.

== See also ==
- Transport in Chile
- List of airports in Chile
