= Fachinal Airport =

- IATA: none; ICAO: SCFC

Summary
- Airport type: Public
- Serves: Fachinal (es), Chile
- Elevation AMSL: 693 ft / 211 m
- Coordinates: 46°32′55″S 72°13′10″W

Map
- Location of Fachinal Airport in Chile

Runways
Direction	Length		Surface
Direction	m	ft	Surface
06/24	815	2,674	Grass
- Source: Landings.com Google Maps GCM

Fachinal Airport (Spanish: Aeropuerto Fachinal, (ICAO: SCFC) is an airstrip 38 kilometres (24 mi) west of Chile Chico in the Aysén Region of Chile.

The small agricultural settlement of Fachinal (es) is on a point on the south shore of General Carrera Lake 40 kilometres (25 mi) west of the Argentina border.

There is mountainous terrain in all quadrants. Approach and departure to either end of the runway are over the lake. The runway has an additional 215 metres (705 ft) of unpaved overrun on the west end.

== See also ==
- Transport in Chile
- List of airports in Chile
