= Lago Verde Airport =

- IATA: none; ICAO: SCVE

Summary
- Airport type: Public
- Serves: Lago Verde, Chile
- Elevation AMSL: 1,020 ft / 311 m
- Coordinates: 44°13′45″S 71°51′05″W

Map
- Location of Lago Verde Airport in Chile

Runways
Direction	Length		Surface
Direction	m	ft	Surface
04/22	903	2,963	Grass
- Source: GCM Google Maps

Lago Verde Airport Spanish: Aeropuerto Lago Verde, (ICAO: SCVE) is an airport just north of Lago Verde, a lakeside village in the Aysén Region of Chile.

Runway 04 has an additional 180 metres (590 ft) of unpaved overrun. Approach to Runway 04 is over the lake.

There is mountainous terrain in all quadrants

== See also ==
- Transport in Chile
- List of airports in Chile
