= Caldera Airport =

- IATA: none; ICAO: SCCL

Summary
- Airport type: Public
- Serves: Caldera, Chile
- Elevation AMSL: 180 ft / 55 m
- Coordinates: 27°04′40″S 70°47′45″W

Map
- Location of Caldera Airport in Chile

Runways
Direction	Length		Surface
Direction	m	ft	Surface
11/29	1,200	3,937	Asphalt
- Source: Landings.com Google Maps GCM

Caldera Airport Spanish: Aeropuerto de Caldera, (ICAO: SCCL) is a desert airport serving Caldera, a Pacific coastal port in the Atacama Region of Chile.

The airport is 2 kilometres (1.2 mi) inland from the Caldera harbor.

The Atacama VOR-DME (Ident: DAT) is located 12.1 nautical miles (22.4 km) south of the airport. The Caldera non-directional beacon (Ident: CLD) is located on the field.

== See also ==
- Transport in Chile
- List of airports in Chile
