= El Budi Airport =

- IATA: none; ICAO: SCSH

Summary
- Airport type: Public
- Serves: Teodoro Schmidt, Chile
- Location: Hualpin
- Elevation AMSL: 82 ft / 25 m
- Coordinates: 39°03′48″S 73°10′10″W

Map
- Location of El Budi Airport in Chile

Runways
Direction	Length		Surface
Direction	m	ft	Surface
03/21	870	2,854	Grass
- Source: Landings.com Google Maps GCM

El Budi Airport (ICAO: SCSH) is an airstrip serving the Teodoro Schmidt commune in the La Araucanía Region of Chile. The runway is 3 kilometres (1.9 mi) north of the town of Hualpin.

== See also ==
- Transport in Chile
- List of airports in Chile
