= Lequecahue Airport =

Lequecahue Airport Tirúa Airport
- IATA: none; ICAO: SCQK

Summary
- Airport type: Public
- Serves: Tirúa, Chile
- Elevation AMSL: 220 ft / 67 m
- Coordinates: 38°21′40″S 73°29′23″W

Map
- Location of Lequecahue Airport in Chile

Runways
Direction	Length		Surface
Direction	m	ft	Surface
18/36	725	2,379	Asphalt
- Sources: Landings.com Google Maps GCM

Lequecahue Airport (Spanish: Aeropuerto de Tirúa, (ICAO: SCQK)) is an airport 2 kilometres (1.2 mi) south of Tirúa, a Pacific coastal town in the Bío Bío Region of Chile.

The runway is on a bluff 1.6 kilometres (1 mi) inland from the shore.

== See also ==
- Transport in Chile
- List of airports in Chile
