= Paredes Viejas Airport =

- IATA: none; ICAO: SCVJ

Summary
- Airport type: Private
- Serves: Marchigüe, Chile
- Elevation AMSL: 449 ft / 137 m
- Coordinates: 34°23′50″S 71°32′35″W

Map
- Location of Paredes Viejas Airport in Chile

Runways
Direction	Length		Surface
Direction	m	ft	Surface
11/29	600	1,969	Grass
- Source: Landings.com Google Maps GCM

Paredes Viejas Airport Spanish: Aeropuerto de Paredes Viejas, (ICAO: SCVJ) is an airstrip 7 kilometres (4.3 mi) east of Marchigüe, a town in the O'Higgins Region of Chile.

Runway 11 has an additional 410 metres (1,350 ft) of unpaved overrun. There is distant rising terrain north through southeast.

== See also ==
- Transport in Chile
- List of airports in Chile
