= Alberto Santos Dumont Airport (Chile) =

- IATA: none; ICAO: SCSA

Summary
- Airport type: Public
- Serves: Tiltil, Chile
- Elevation AMSL: 2,346 ft / 715 m
- Coordinates: 33°01′45″S 70°52′48″W

Map
- Location of Alberto Santos Dumont Airport in Chile

Runways
Direction	Length		Surface
Direction	m	ft	Surface
18/36	400	1,312	Grass
- Source: Google Maps OurAirports

Alberto Santos Dumont Airport (Spanish: Aeropuerto de Alberto Santos Dumont, (ICAO: SCSA)) is an airport serving Tiltil, a town in the Santiago Metropolitan Region of Chile. The airport is named in honor of Alberto Santos-Dumont, a Brazilian aviation pioneer.

The airport is 48 kilometres (30 mi) northwest of Santiago. There is high terrain northeast and northwest.

== See also ==
- Transport in Chile
- List of airports in Chile
