= Chepica Airport =

Airstrip in the O'Higgins Region of Chile

Chépica Airport
- IATA: none; ICAO: SCEK

Summary
- Airport type: Defunct
- Serves: Chépica, Chile
- Elevation AMSL: 610 ft / 186 m
- Coordinates: 34°44′19″S 71°19′28″W

Map
- Location of Chépica Airport in Chile

Runways
Direction	Length		Surface
Direction	ft	m	Surface
Closed
- Source: Landings.com Google Maps

Chépica Airport (Spanish: Aeropuerto de Chépica, (ICAO: SCEK)) was an airstrip 4 kilometres (2.5 mi) west of Chépica, a town in the O'Higgins Region of Chile.

Google Earth Historical Imagery (10/24/2011) shows a 695 metres (2,280 ft) grass runway within the arcs of two pivot irrigation systems. The (1/6/2013) and subsequent imagery show the runway boundaries have been removed and the land is under cultivation.

== See also ==
- Transport in Chile
- List of airports in Chile
