= Cumpeo La Obra Airport =

Airport in Cumpeo, Chile

La Obra Airport
- IATA: none; ICAO: SCUM

Summary
- Airport type: Private
- Serves: Río Claro, Chile
- Location: Cumpeo
- Elevation AMSL: 673 ft / 205 m
- Coordinates: 35°18′00″S 71°19′48″W

Map
- Location of La Obra Airport in Chile

Runways
Direction	Length		Surface
Direction	m	ft	Surface
02/20	795	2,608	Grass
- Source: Landings.com Google Maps GCM

La Obra Airport Spanish: Aeropuerto La Obra, (ICAO: SCUM) is an airstrip serving Cumpeo, a small town in the Río Claro commune of the Maule Region in Chile. The airstrip is 6 kilometres (3.7 mi) southwest of the town.

The Curico VOR-DME (Ident: ICO) is 20.8 nautical miles (38.5 km) north-northeast of the airstrip.

== See also ==
- Transport in Chile
- List of airports in Chile
