= Los Guayes Airport =

- IATA: none; ICAO: SCGY

Summary
- Airport type: Private
- Serves: Cunco, Chile
- Elevation AMSL: 1,312 ft / 400 m
- Coordinates: 39°03′05″S 71°59′38″W

Map
- Location of Los Guayes Airport in Chile

Runways
Direction	Length		Surface
Direction	m	ft	Surface
16/34	625	2,051	Grass
- Source: Landings.com Google Maps GCM

Los Guayes Airport Spanish: Aeropuerto Los Guayes, (ICAO: SCGY) is a rural airstrip on the north shore of Colico Lake in the Araucanía Region of Chile. The nearest city is Cunco, 14 kilometres (9 mi) to the north.

South approach and departure are over the lake.

== See also ==
- Transport in Chile
- List of airports in Chile
