= Los Gomeros Airport =

- IATA: none; ICAO: SCGM

Summary
- Airport type: Private
- Serves: Rengo
- Elevation AMSL: 1,034 ft / 315 m
- Coordinates: 34°21′40″S 70°52′55″W

Map
- Location of Los Gomeros Airport in Chile

Runways
Direction	Length		Surface
Direction	m	ft	Surface
02/20	625	2,051	Grass
- Source: Landings.com Google Maps GCM

Los Gomeros Airport (Spanish: Aeropuerto Los Gomeros), (ICAO: SCGM) is an airport 5 kilometres (3.1 mi) north of Rengo, a city in the O'Higgins Region of Chile.

== See also ==
- Transport in Chile
- List of airports in Chile
