= Los Morros Airport =

- IATA: none; ICAO: SCQR

Summary
- Airport type: Public
- Serves: Cobquecura, Chile
- Elevation AMSL: 7 ft / 2 m
- Coordinates: 36°07′20″S 72°48′18″W

Map
- Location of Los Morros Airport in Chile

Runways
Direction	Length		Surface
Direction	m	ft	Surface
17/35	700	2,297	Sand
- Source: Landings.com Google Maps GCM

Los Morros Airport Spanish: Aeropuerto de Los Morros, (ICAO: SCQR) is an airstrip serving the small Pacific coastal town of Cobquecura, in the Bío Bío Region of Chile.

The runway follows the shoreline. The terrain rises to the east.

== See also ==
- Transport in Chile
- List of airports in Chile
