= Poco a Poco Airport =

Mulchén Poco A Poco Airport
- IATA: none; ICAO: SCPP

Summary
- Airport type: Closed
- Serves: Mulchén, Chile
- Elevation AMSL: 1,680 ft / 512 m
- Coordinates: 37°50′51.0″S 072°0′35.0″W

Map
- Location of Mulchén Poco A Poco Airport in Chile

Runways
Direction	Length		Surface
Direction	ft	m	Surface
Closed
- Source: Google Maps

Mulchén Poco A Poco Airport (Spanish: Aeropuerto de Mulchén Poco A Poco), (ICAO: SCPP) was an airstrip serving Mulchén, in the Bío Bío Region of Chile.

Google Earth Historical Imagery (4/28/2007) shows a 790 metres (2,590 ft) grass airstrip within a commercial forest. The (9/4/2010) image shows the land planted with trees.

== See also ==
- Transport in Chile
- List of airports in Chile
