= El Boldo Airport =

- IATA: none; ICAO: SCCA

Summary
- Airport type: Public
- Serves: Cauquenes, Chile
- Location: El Boldo
- Elevation AMSL: 525 ft / 160 m
- Coordinates: 35°58′15″S 72°13′30″W

Map
- Location of El Boldo Airport in Chile

Runways
Direction	Length		Surface
Direction	m	ft	Surface
18/36	870	2,854	Asphalt
09/27	841	2,759	Grass
- Source: Landings.com Google Maps GCM

El Boldo Airport Spanish: Aeropuerto de El Boldo, (ICAO: SCCA) is an airport serving Cauquenes, a city in the Maule Region of Chile. The airport is 8 kilometres (5.0 mi) east of Cauquenes.

== See also ==
- Transport in Chile
- List of airports in Chile
