= Los Pehuenches Airport =

- IATA: none; ICAO: SCLB

Summary
- Airport type: Public
- Serves: Lebu, Chile
- Elevation AMSL: 587 ft / 179 m
- Coordinates: 37°39′25″S 73°37′42″W

Map
- Location of Los Pehuenches Airport in Chile

Runways
Direction	Length		Surface
Direction	m	ft	Surface
18/36	800	2,625	Asphalt
- Source: Landings.com Google Maps GCM

Los Pehuenches Airport (ICAO: SCLB) is an airport serving Lebu, a Pacific coastal city in the Bío Bío Region of Chile. The airport is in forested land 5 kilometres (3.1 mi) southeast of Lebu.

== See also ==
- Transport in Chile
- List of airports in Chile
