= Chicureo Airport =

Airport in Chile

- IATA: none; ICAO: SCHC

Summary
- Airport type: Public
- Serves: Santiago, Chile
- Location: Chicureo (es)
- Elevation AMSL: 1,886 ft / 575 m
- Coordinates: 33°16′12″S 70°39′00″W

Map
- Location of Santiago Chicureo Airport in Chile

Runways
Direction	Length		Surface
Direction	m	ft	Surface
05/23	750	2,461	Grass
- Sources: Landings.com Google Maps GCM

Chicureo Airport (Spanish: Aeropuerto de Chicureo, (ICAO: SCHC)) is an airport in the city of Chicureo (es), 22 kilometres (14 mi) north of Santiago, in the Santiago Metropolitan Region of Chile.

There is mountainous and high terrain in all quadrants except to the west.

== See also ==
- Transport in Chile
- List of airports in Chile
