= Estancia Río Cisnes Airport =

- IATA: none; ICAO: SCRE

Summary
- Airport type: Public
- Serves: Lago Verde, Chile
- Elevation AMSL: 2,150 ft / 655 m
- Coordinates: 44°30′00″S 71°18′52″W

Map
- Location of Estancia Río Cisnes Airport in Chile

Runways
Direction	Length		Surface
Direction	m	ft	Surface
05/23	690	2,264	Grass
- Source: Landings.com Google Maps GCM

Estancia Río Cisnes Airport (Spanish: Aeropuerto Estancia Río Cisnes), (ICAO: SCRE) is an airport serving the Lago Verde commune in the Aysén Region of Chile.

The airport is 6 kilometres (3.7 mi) north of the Cisnes River, and 8 kilometres (5.0 mi) south of the border with Argentina.

There are nearby hills northwest of the airport.

== See also ==
- Transport in Chile
- List of airports in Chile
