= Las Mercedes Airport (Chile) =

- IATA: none; ICAO: SCLM

Summary
- Airport type: Public
- Serves: San Javier, Chile
- Elevation AMSL: 246 ft / 75 m
- Coordinates: 35°29′30″S 71°52′50″W

Map
- Location of Las Mercedes Airport in Chile

Runways
Direction	Length		Surface
Direction	m	ft	Surface
16/34	705	2,313	Grass
- Sources: GCM Google Maps

Las Mercedes Airport (ICAO: SCLM) is an airstrip serving San Javier, a town in the Maule Region of Chile.

The runway is 17 kilometres (11 mi) northwest of San Javier, and has approximately 185 metres (607 ft) of unpaved overrun on the south end. There are hills immediately south of the airport, and more distant rising terrain west and north.

== See also ==
- Transport in Chile
- List of airports in Chile
