= El Salto Airport =

- IATA: none; ICAO: SCEO

Summary
- Airport type: Public
- Serves: Parral
- Elevation AMSL: 564 ft / 172 m
- Coordinates: 36°7′45″S 71°51′30″W

Map
- Location of El Salto Airport in Chile

Runways
Direction	Length		Surface
Direction	m	ft	Surface
03/21	600	1,969	Dirt
- Source: Landings.com Google Maps GCM

El Salto Airport (Spanish: Aeropuerto El Salto, (ICAO: SCEO)) is an airport 2 kilometres (1.2 mi) northwest of Parral, a city in the Maule Region of Chile.

== See also ==
- Transport in Chile
- List of airports in Chile
