= Los Maitenes Airport =

- IATA: none; ICAO: SCYR

Summary
- Airport type: Public
- Serves: Retiro, Chile
- Elevation AMSL: 538 ft / 164 m
- Coordinates: 36°01′50″S 71°44′25″W

Map
- Location of Los Maitenes Airport in Chile

Runways
Direction	Length		Surface
Direction	m	ft	Surface
03/21	700	2,297	Grass
- Source: Landings.com Google Maps GCM

Retiro Los Maitenes Airport (Spanish: Aeropuerto Los Maitenes, (ICAO: SCYR)) is an airport 2 kilometres (1.2 mi) northeast of Retiro, a town in the Maule Region of Chile.

== See also ==
- Transport in Chile
- List of airports in Chile
