= Lontuecito Airport =

- IATA: none; ICAO: SCUP

Summary
- Airport type: Public
- Serves: Río Claro, Chile
- Elevation AMSL: 1,066 ft / 325 m
- Coordinates: 35°17′00″S 71°14′12″W

Map
- Location of Lontuecito Airport in Chile

Runways
Direction	Length		Surface
Direction	m	ft	Surface
03/21	980	3,215	Grass
- Source: Landings.com Google Maps GCM

Lontuecito Airport (Spanish: Aeropuerto de Lontuecito), (ICAO: SCUP) is an airstrip serving the Río Claro commune of the Maule Region in Chile. The runway is 1.6 kilometres (1 mi) east of Cumpeo (es), the municipal seat of the commune.

== See also ==
- Transport in Chile
- List of airports in Chile
