= Cotreumo Airport =

Airstrip in Chile

- IATA: none; ICAO: SCBN

Summary
- Airport type: Public
- Serves: Río Bueno, Chile
- Elevation AMSL: 607 ft / 185 m
- Coordinates: 40°24′00″S 72°39′39″W

Map
- Location of Cotreumo Airport in Chile

Runways
Direction	Length		Surface
Direction	m	ft	Surface
02/20	600	1,969	Grass
- Source: Landings.com Google Maps GCM

Cotreumo Airport (Spanish: Aeropuerto Cotreumo, (ICAO: SCBN)) is an airstrip serving the Río Bueno commune in the Los Ríos Region of Chile. The airstrip is 25 kilometres (16 mi) east of Río Bueno city.

An open-ended culvert crosses beneath the runway 185 metres (607 ft) from the south end, and may be a hazard for aircraft departing the centerline. The runway is 24 metres (79 ft) wide at that point.

== See also ==
- Transport in Chile
- List of airports in Chile
