= Santa Teresa del Almendral Airport =

- IATA: none; ICAO: SCTS

Summary
- Airport type: Private
- Serves: Melipilla, Chile
- Elevation AMSL: 574 ft / 175 m
- Coordinates: 33°34′28″S 71°15′45″W

Map
- Location of Santa Teresa del Almendral Airport in Chile

Runways
Direction	Length		Surface
Direction	m	ft	Surface
01/19	770	2,526	Grass
09/27	770	2,526	Grass
- Source: Landings.com Google Maps GCM

Santa Teresa del Almendral Airport (Spanish: Aeropuerto de Santa Teresa del Almendral), (ICAO: SCTS) is an airport 12 kilometres (7.5 mi) north-northwest of Melipilla, a city in the Santiago Metropolitan Region of Chile. The airport is 1 kilometre (0.6 mi) west of the Puangue River.

There is distant rising terrain west and north. Runway 27 has an additional 235 metres (771 ft) of unpaved overrun.

== See also ==
- Transport in Chile
- List of airports in Chile
