= El Principal Airport =

- IATA: none; ICAO: SCEP

Summary
- Airport type: Public
- Serves: Pirque, Chile
- Elevation AMSL: 2,592 ft / 790 m
- Coordinates: 33°43′30″S 70°30′40″W

Map
- Location of El Principal Airport in Chile

Runways
Direction	Length		Surface
Direction	m	ft	Surface
07/25	530	1,739	Grass
- Source: Landings.com Google Maps GCM

El Principal Airport (Spanish: Aeropuerto El Principal), (ICAO: SCEP) is an airstrip in the Pirque commune of the Santiago Metropolitan Region in Chile.

There is nearby mountainous terrain north through east of the runway, and rising terrain southeast through southwest.

== See also ==
- Transport in Chile
- List of airports in Chile
