= Santa Bárbara Airport (Chile) =

- IATA: none; ICAO: SCRO

Summary
- Airport type: Private
- Serves: Romeral, Chile
- Elevation AMSL: 1,420 ft / 433 m
- Coordinates: 34°57′32″S 71°01′55″W

Map
- Location of Santa Bárbara Airport in Chile

Runways
Direction	Length		Surface
Direction	m	ft	Surface
09/27	605	1,985	Gravel
- Source: GCM

Santa Bárbara Airport (Spanish: Aeropuerto de Santa Bárbara, (ICAO: SCRO)) is an airport 8 kilometres (5.0 mi) east of Romeral, a town in the Maule Region of Chile.

== See also ==
- Transport in Chile
- List of airports in Chile
