= Meseta Cosmelli Airport =

- IATA: none; ICAO: SCMC

Summary
- Airport type: Public
- Serves: Puerto Guadal (es), Chile
- Elevation AMSL: 950 ft / 290 m
- Coordinates: 46°44′47″S 72°31′35″W

Map
- Location of Meseta Cosmelli Airport in Chile

Runways
Direction	Length		Surface
Direction	m	ft	Surface
13/31	595	1,952	Grass
- Source: Landings.com Google Maps

Meseta Cosmelli Airport (Spanish: Aeropuerto Meseta Cosmelli), (ICAO: SCMC) is an airstrip 18 kilometres (11 mi) northeast of Puerto Guadal (es), a small town on the southwestern shore of General Carrera Lake in the Aysén Region of Chile.

The airstrip is on mesa overlooking the lake. There is a hill 500 metres (1,600 ft) south of the runway.

== See also ==
- Transport in Chile
- List of airports in Chile
