= List of airports by ICAO code: SA-SC =

List of airports by ICAO code: A - B - C - D - EB-EG - EH-EY - FA-FM - FN-FZ - G - H - ~~I~~ - J - KA-KH - KI-KP - KR-KZ - LA-LJ - LK-LZ - M - N - O - P - Q - R - SA-SC - SD-SH - SI - SJ - SK-SM - SN-SP - SQ - SS-SU - SV-SY - T - U - V - W - ~~X~~ - YA-YG - YH-YQ - YR-YZ - Z

== SA - Argentina ==
Also see airport category and list.

ICAO	IATA	Airport name	Community	Coordinates	Notes
SAAA		San Antonio de Areco Airport	San Antonio de Areco, Buenos Aires Province	34°12′41″S 059°23′30″W	
SAAC	COC	Concordia Airport	Concordia, Entre Ríos	31°17′49″S 057°59′47″W	
SAAG	GHU	Gualeguaychú Airport	Gualeguaychú, Entre Ríos	33°00′37″S 058°36′47″W	
SAAI		Punta Indio Naval Air Base	Verónica, Buenos Aires	35°20′52″S 057°17′40″W	
SAAJ	JNI	Junín Airport	Junín, Buenos Aires	34°32′45″S 060°55′50″W	Closed
SAAK		Martín García Island Airport	Martín García Island, Buenos Aires Province	34°10′55″S 058°14′49″W	
SAAM		Mazaruca Airport	Mazaruca, Entre Rios Province	33°36′05″S 059°16′30″W	
SAAN		Pergamino Aeroclub	Pergamino Aeroclub, Buenos Aires Province	33°55′15″S 060°38′58″W	
SAAP	PRA	General Justo José de Urquiza Airport	Paraná, Entre Ríos	31°47′41″S 060°28′49″W	
SAAR	ROS	Rosario – Islas Malvinas International Airport	Rosario, Santa Fe	32°54′13″S 060°47′06″W	
SAAU		Villaguay Aerodrome	Villaguay, Entre Ríos Province	31°51′03″S 059°04′23″W	
SAAV	SFN	Sauce Viejo Airport	Santa Fe	31°42′42″S 060°48′42″W	
SABC		Fuerza Aérea (Edificio Cóndor) Heliport	Buenos Aires	34°35′09″S 058°22′05″W	
SABE	AEP	Aeroparque Jorge Newbery	Buenos Aires	34°33′33″S 058°24′57″W	
SACA		Capitán Omar Darío Gerardi Airport	Córdoba	31°26′29″S 064°15′31″W	
SACC	LCM	La Cumbre Airport	La Cumbre, Córdoba	31°00′21″S 064°31′55″W	
SACD		Coronel Olmedo Airport	Coronel Olmedo, Córdoba Province	31°29′16″S 064°08′30″W	
SACE		Escuela de Aviación Militar Airport	Córdoba	31°26′41″S 064°17′01″W	
SACM		Villa General Mitre Airport	Villa del Totoral, Córdoba Province	30°41′58″S 064°02′20″W	Closed
SACN		Ascochinga Airport	Ascochinga, Córdoba Province	30°59′25″S 064°14′39″W	
SACO	COR	Ingeniero Aeronáutico Ambrosio L.V. Taravella International Airport	Córdoba	31°19′25″S 064°12′28″W	
SACP		Chepes Airport	Chepes, La Rioja Province	31°21′21″S 066°35′27″W	
SACQ		Monte Quemado Airport	Monte Quemado, Santiago del Estero Province	25°47′23″S 062°49′50″W	
SACS		Villa de Soto Airport	Villa de Soto, Córdoba Province	30°52′32″S 064°59′35″W	
SACT		Chamical Airport	Chamical, La Rioja Province	30°20′37″S 066°17′38″W	
SACV		Villa María de Río Seco Airport	Villa de María del Río Seco, Córdoba Province	29°55′29″S 063°38′38″W	Closed
SADD		Don Torcuato Aerodrome	Don Torcuato, Buenos Aires Province	34°30′02″S 058°36′15″W	Closed
SADF		San Fernando Airport	San Fernando, Buenos Aires Province	34°27′11″S 058°35′22″W	
SADJ		Mariano Moreno Airport	José C. Paz, Buenos Aires	34°33′38″S 058°47′22″W	
SADL	LPG	La Plata Airport	La Plata, Buenos Aires Province	34°58′20″S 057°53′40″W	
SADM		Morón Airport and Air Base	Morón, Buenos Aires	34°40′34″S 058°38′34″W	
SADO		Campo de Mayo Military Airport - Army Air Service Main Base and Border Police Air Base	San Miguel, Buenos Aires northwest of downtown	34°32′04″S 058°40′19″W	
SADP	EPA	El Palomar Airport	El Palomar	34°36′35″S 058°36′45″W	
SADQ		Quilmes Airport	Quilmes, Buenos Aires Province	34°42′24″S 058°14′40″W	
SADR		Merlo Airport	Merlo, Buenos Aires Province	32°21′22″S 065°01′02″W	Closed
SADS		Aeroclub Argentino	San Justo, Buenos Aires	34°43′50″S 058°35′58″W	
SADZ		Univ. Río Matanza Aeroclub	La Matanza Partido, Buenos Aires Province	34°43′42″S 058°30′03″W	
SAEA		General Acha Airport	General Acha, La Pampa Province	37°24′02″S 064°36′44″W	
SAEL		Las Flores Airport	Las Flores, Buenos Aires	36°04′02″S 059°06′16″W	
SAEM	MJR	Miramar Airport	Miramar, Buenos Aires	38°13′40″S 057°52′15″W	
SAET		Ñanco Lauquen Airport	Trenque Lauquen, Buenos Aires Province	35°58′16″S 062°46′21″W	
SAEZ	EZE	Ministro Pistarini International Airport (Ezeiza International Airport)	Ezeiza, Buenos Aires	34°49′20″S 058°32′09″W	
SAFE		Santa Fé Airport	Santa Fe	31°39′34″S 060°48′53″W	Closed
SAFR	RAF	Rafaela Aerodrome	Rafaela, Santa Fe Province	31°16′57″S 061°30′06″W	
SAFS	NCJ	Sunchales Aeroclub Airport	Sunchales, Santa Fe	30°57′25″S 061°31′45″W	
SAHC	HOS	Chos Malal Airport	Chos Malal, Neuquén Province	37°26′41″S 070°13′20″W	
SAHE	CVH	Caviahue Airport	Caviahue, Neuquén Province	37°51′05″S 071°00′34″W	
SAHR	GNR	Dr. Arturo Umberto Illia Airport	General Roca, Río Negro	39°00′02″S 067°37′13″W	
SAHS	RDS	Rincón de los Sauces Airport	Rincón de Los Sauces, Neuquén Province	37°23′26″S 068°54′15″W	
SAHZ	APZ	Zapala Airport	Zapala, Neuquén Province	38°58′31″S 070°06′49″W	
SAMA		General Alvear Airport	General Alvear, Mendoza	35°03′35″S 067°41′35″W	Closed
SAME	MDZ	Governor Francisco Gabrielli International Airport (El Plumerillo International Airport)	Mendoza, Mendoza Province	32°49′54″S 068°47′34″W	
SAMI		San Martín Airport	San Martín, Mendoza	33°03′45″S 068°30′30″W	
SAMJ		Jáchal Airport	San José de Jáchal, San Juan Province	30°14′53″S 068°45′55″W	Closed
SAML		Punta de Vacas Heliport	Punta de Vacas, Mendoza Province	32°51′03″S 069°45′26″W	
SAMM	LGS	Comodoro D. Ricardo Salomón Airport	Malargüe, Mendoza Province	35°29′36″S 069°34′27″W	
SAMP		La Paz Aeroclub	La Paz, Entre Ríos	30°44′39″S 059°34′09″W	
SAMQ		Ciudad de Mendoza Airpark	Mendoza	32°51′55″S 068°52′18″W	
SAMR	AFA	San Rafael Airport	San Rafael, Mendoza Province	34°35′17″S 068°24′13″W	
SAMS		San Carlos Airport	San Carlos, Mendoza	33°46′51″S 069°04′06″W	
SAMU		Uspallata Airport	Uspallata, Mendoza Province	32°32′20″S 069°20′46″W	
SANC	CTC	Coronel Felipe Varela Airport	Catamarca, Catamarca Province	28°35′35″S 065°45′03″W	
SANE	SDE	Vicecomodoro Ángel de la Paz Aragonés Airport	Santiago del Estero, Santiago del Estero Province	27°45′56″S 064°18′36″W	
SANI		Tinogasta Airport	Tinogasta, Catamarca Province	28°02′27″S 067°34′40″W	
SANL	IRJ	Capitán Vicente Almandos Almonacid Airport	La Rioja	29°22′53″S 066°47′45″W	
SANO		Chilecito Airport	Chilecito, La Rioja Province	29°13′26″S 067°26′20″W	
SANR	RHD	Las Termas Airport	Termas de Río Hondo, Santiago del Estero Province	27°30′52″S 064°54′20″W	
SANT	TUC	Tte. Gral. Benjamín Matienzo International Airport (Lt. Gen. Benjamín Matienzo)	Tucumán, Tucumán Province	26°50′27″S 065°06′17″W	
SANU	UAQ	Domingo Faustino Sarmiento Airport	San Juan	31°34′17″S 068°25′05″W	
SANW	CRR	Ceres Airport	Ceres, Santa Fe Province	29°52′19″S 061°55′37″W	
SAOC	RCU	Las Higueras Airport	Río Cuarto, Córdoba	33°05′06″S 064°15′40″W	
SAOD	VDR	Villa Dolores Airport	Villa Dolores, Córdoba Province	31°56′43″S 065°08′47″W	
SAOE		Río Tercero Airport	Río Tercero, Córdoba	32°10′24″S 064°05′18″W	
SAOI		Villa María Airport	Villa María, Córdoba	32°23′21″S 063°15′30″W	Closed
SAOL		Laboulaye Airport	Laboulaye, Córdoba	34°08′08″S 063°21′44″W	
SAOM		Marcos Juárez Airport	Marcos Juárez, Córdoba Province	32°41′03″S 062°09′29″W	
SAOR	VME	Villa Reynolds Airport	Villa Reynolds, San Luis Province	33°43′30″S 065°22′41″W	
SAOS	RLO	Valle del Conlara Airport	Villa de Merlo, San Luis Province	32°23′05″S 065°11′11″W	
SAOU	LUQ	San Luis Airport	San Luis	33°16′23″S 066°21′23″W	
SAOV	RLO	Valle del Conlara Airport	Villa de Merlo, San Luis Province	32°19′10″S 063°13′35″W	
SARC	CNQ	Doctor Fernando Piragine Niveyro International Airport	Corrientes, Corrientes Province	27°26′43″S 058°45′42″W	
SARE	RES	Resistencia International Airport	Resistencia, Chaco	27°26′59″S 059°03′22″W	
SARF	FMA	Formosa International Airport	Formosa, Formosa Province	26°12′45″S 058°13′41″W	
SARI	IGR	Cataratas del Iguazú International Airport (Iguazú Falls)	Puerto Iguazú, Misiones Province	25°44′14″S 054°28′24″W	
SARL	AOL	Paso de los Libres Airport	Paso de los Libres, Corrientes Province	29°41′21″S 057°09′07″W	
SARM	MCS	Monte Caseros Airport	Monte Caseros, Corrientes	30°16′19″S 057°38′25″W	
SARO		Ituzaingó Yacireta Airport	Ituzaingó, Corrientes	27°31′31″S 056°38′02″W	
SARP	PSS	Libertador General José de San Martín Airport	Posadas, Misiones	27°23′09″S 055°58′14″W	
SARR		Resistencia Aeroclub	Resistencia, Chaco Province	27°37′55″S 059°10′49″W	
SARS	PRQ	Presidencia Roque Sáenz Peña Airport	Presidencia Roque Sáenz Peña, Chaco Province	26°45′20″S 060°29′36″W	
SARV		Villa Angela Airport	Villa Ángela, Chaco Province	27°35′42″S 060°41′03″W	
SASA	SLA	Martín Miguel de Güemes International Airport (El Aybal Airport)	Salta, Salta Province	24°51′21″S 065°29′10″W	
SASJ	JUJ	Gobernador Horacio Guzmán International Airport	San Salvador de Jujuy, Jujuy Province	24°23′34″S 065°05′52″W	
SASO	ORA	Orán Airport	Orán, Salta Province	23°09′10″S 064°19′45″W	
SASQ		La Quiaca Airport	La Quiaca, Jujuy Province	22°09′42″S 065°34′20″W	
SASR		Rivadavia Airport	Rivadavia, Mendoza Province	33°13′43″S 068°28′27″W	
SAST	TTG	Tartagal "General Enrique Mosconi" Airport	Tartagal, Salta Province	22°37′09″S 063°47′35″W	
SATC	CLX	Clorinda Airport	Clorinda, Formosa Province	25°18′17″S 057°44′05″W	
SATD	ELO	El Dorado Airport	Eldorado, Misiones	26°23′52″S 054°34′29″W	
SATG	OYA	Goya Airport	Goya, Corrientes Province	29°05′58″S 059°15′02″W	
SATI		Bernardo de Irigoyen Airport	Bernardo de Irigoyen, Misiones	26°15′00″S 053°37′46″W	
SATK	LLS	Alférez Armando Rodríguez Airport	Las Lomitas, Formosa Province	24°43′16″S 060°32′57″W	
SATM	MDX	Mercedes Airport	Mercedes, Corrientes	29°13′08″S 058°05′13″W	
SATO		Oberá Airport	Oberá, Misiones Province	27°31′05″S 055°07′27″W	
SATR	RCQ	Daniel Jurkic Airport	Reconquista, Santa Fe	29°12′37″S 059°40′48″W	
SATU	UZU	Curuzú Cuatiá Airport	Curuzú Cuatiá, Corrientes Province	29°46′14″S 057°58′44″W	
SAVB	EHL	El Bolsón Airport	El Bolsón, Río Negro Province	41°56′35″S 071°31′56″W	
SAVC	CRD	General Enrique Mosconi Airport	Comodoro Rivadavia, Chubut Province	45°47′07″S 067°27′55″W	
SAVD	EMX	El Maitén Airport	El Maitén, Chubut Province	42°01′49″S 071°10′14″W	
SAVE	EQS	Esquel Airport	Esquel, Chubut Province	42°54′28″S 071°08′22″W	
SAVH	LHS	Colonia Las Heras Airport	Las Heras, Santa Cruz	46°32′18″S 068°57′55″W	
SAVJ	IGB	Ingeniero Jacobacci Airport	Ingeniero Jacobacci, Río Negro Province	41°19′15″S 069°34′30″W	
SAVM	OLN	Lago Musters Airport	Sarmiento, Chubut	45°34′30″S 069°04′40″W	
SAVN	OES	Antoine de Saint Exupéry Airport	San Antonio Oeste, Río Negro Province	40°45′04″S 065°02′03″W	
SAVQ	MQD	Maquinchao Airport	Maquinchao, Río Negro Province	41°14′24″S 068°42′04″W	
SAVR	ARR	Alto Río Senguer Airport	Alto Río Senguer, Chubut Province	45°00′48″S 070°48′46″W	
SAVS	SGV	Sierra Grande Airport	Sierra Grande, Río Negro	41°35′28″S 065°20′23″W	
SAVT	REL	Almirante Marcos A. Zar Airport	Trelew, Chubut Province	43°12′37″S 065°16′13″W	
SAVV	VDM	Gobernador Edgardo Castello Airport	Viedma, Río Negro	40°52′09″S 063°00′01″W	
SAVY	PMY	El Tehuelche Airport	Puerto Madryn, Chubut Province	42°45′32″S 065°06′09″W	
SAWA	ING	Lago Argentino Airport	El Calafate City, Santa Cruz Province	50°20′08″S 072°14′55″W	Closed
SAWC	FTE	Comandante Armando Tola International Airport	El Calafate, Santa Cruz Province	50°16′49″S 072°03′11″W	
SAWD	PUD	Puerto Deseado Airport	Puerto Deseado, Santa Cruz Province	47°44′07″S 065°54′15″W	
SAWE	RGA	Hermes Quijada International Airport	Río Grande, Tierra del Fuego	53°46′39″S 067°44′57″W	
SAWG	RGL	Piloto Civil Norberto Fernández International Airport	Río Gallegos, Santa Cruz	51°36′31″S 069°18′45″W	
SAWH	USH	Ushuaia – Malvinas Argentinas International Airport	Ushuaia, Tierra del Fuego Province	54°50′35″S 068°17′44″W	
SAWJ	ULA	Capitán José Daniel Vazquez Airport	San Julián, Santa Cruz Province	49°18′24″S 067°48′09″W	
SAWL		Tolhuin Lago Fagnano Airport	Tolhuin, Tierra del Fuego Province	54°29′59″S 067°10′20″W	
SAWM	ROY	Río Mayo Airport	Río Mayo, Chubut	45°42′15″S 070°14′37″W	
SAWO		Ushuaia Aeroclub	Ushuaia, Tierra del Fuego Province	54°49′22″S 068°18′16″W	
SAWP	PMQ	Perito Moreno Airport	Perito Moreno, Santa Cruz	46°32′16″S 070°58′43″W	
SAWR	GGS	Gobernador Gregores Airport	Gobernador Gregores, Santa Cruz Province	48°46′58″S 070°08′57″W	
SAWS	JSM	José de San Martín Airport	José de San Martín, Chubut Province	44°02′56″S 070°27′03″W	
SAWT	RYO	Rio Turbio Airport	Río Turbio, Santa Cruz Province	51°36′01″S 072°13′19″W	
SAWU	RZA	Santa Cruz Airport	Puerto Santa Cruz	50°00′59″S 068°34′45″W	
SAZA		Azul Airport	Azul, Buenos Aires	36°50′14″S 059°52′51″W	
SAZB	BHI	Comandante Espora Airport	Bahía Blanca, Buenos Aires Province	38°43′29″S 062°10′09″W	
SAZC	CSZ	Brigadier Hector Eduardo Ruiz Airport	Coronel Suárez, Buenos Aires Province	37°26′46″S 061°53′21″W	
SAZD		Dolores Airport	Dolores, Buenos Aires	36°19′11″S 057°43′15″W	
SAZE		Pigüé Airport	Pigüé, Buenos Aires Province	37°36′02″S 062°22′40″W	
SAZF	OVR	Olavarría Airport	Olavarría, Buenos Aires Province	36°53′24″S 060°12′59″W	
SAZG	GPO	General Pico Airport	General Pico, La Pampa Province	35°41′46″S 063°45′29″W	
SAZH	OYO	Tres Arroyos Airport	Tres Arroyos, Buenos Aires Province	38°23′13″S 060°19′47″W	
SAZI		Bolívar Airport	Bolívar, Buenos Aires Province	36°11′11″S 061°04′34″W	
SAZJ		Benito Juárez Airport	Benito Juárez, Buenos Aires	37°42′22″S 059°47′31″W	
SAZK		Cerro Catedral Heliport	Cerro Catedral, Río Negro Province	41°09′52″S 071°26′25″W	
SAZL	SST	Santa Teresita Airport	Santa Teresita, Buenos Aires	36°32′32″S 056°43′18″W	
SAZM	MDQ	Astor Piazzolla International Airport	Mar del Plata, Buenos Aires Province	37°56′03″S 057°34′24″W	
SAZN	NQN	Presidente Perón International Airport	Neuquén, Neuquén Province	38°56′56″S 068°09′20″W	
SAZO	NEC	Necochea Airport	Necochea, Buenos Aires Province	38°28′59″S 058°49′02″W	
SAZP	PEH	Comodoro P. Zanni Airport	Pehuajó, Buenos Aires Province	35°50′40″S 061°51′27″W	
SAZQ		Río Colorado Airport	Río Colorado, Río Negro	38°59′42″S 064°08′26″W	
SAZR	RSA	Santa Rosa Airport	Santa Rosa, La Pampa	36°35′17″S 064°16′32″W	
SAZS	BRC	San Carlos de Bariloche Airport	San Carlos de Bariloche, Río Negro Province	41°09′04″S 071°09′27″W	
SAZT	TDL	Tandil Airport	Tandil, Buenos Aires Province	37°14′14″S 059°13′40″W	
SAZU		Puelches Airport	Puelches, La Pampa	38°08′43″S 065°55′24″W	
SAZV	VLG	Villa Gesell Airport	Villa Gesell, Buenos Aires Province	37°14′07″S 057°01′45″W	
SAZW	CUT	Cutral Có Airport	Cutral Có, Neuquén Province	38°56′22″S 069°15′52″W	
SAZX		Nueve de Julio Airport	Nueve de Julio, Buenos Aires	35°23′54″S 060°56′16″W	
SAZY	CPC	Aviador Carlos Campos Airport (Chapelco Airport)	San Martín de los Andes, Neuquén Province	40°04′31″S 071°08′14″W	

== SB - Brazil ==
Also see airport category and list.

ICAO	IATA	Airport name	Community	Coordinates	Notes
SBAA	CDJ	Conceição do Araguaia Airport	Conceição do Araguaia, Pará	08°20′55″S 049°18′11″W	
SBAC	ARX	Dragão do Mar Airport	Aracati, Ceará	04°34′07″S 037°48′17″W	
SBAE	JTC	Moussa Nakhal Tobias Airport	Bauru / Arealva, São Paulo	22°09′28″S 049°04′06″W	
SBAF		Afonsos Air Force Base	Rio de Janeiro	22°52′32″S 043°23′04″W	
SBAM		Amapa Airfield	Amapá, Amapá	02°04′39″N 050°51′30″W	
SBAN		Anápolis Air Base	Anápolis, Goiás	16°14′19″S 048°58′20″W	
SBAQ	AQA	Araraquara Airport	Araraquara, São Paulo	21°48′43″S 048°07′59″W	
SBAR	AJU	Santa Maria Airport	Aracaju, Sergipe	10°59′07″S 037°04′24″W	
SBAT	AFL	Alta Floresta Airport	Alta Floresta, Mato Grosso	09°51′59″S 056°06′18″W	
SBAU	ARU	Araçatuba Airport	Araçatuba, São Paulo	21°08′39″S 050°25′35″W	
SBAX	AAX	Romeu Zema Airport	Araxá, Minas Gerais	19°33′47″S 046°57′38″W	
SBBE	BEL	Belém/Val-de-Cans International Airport	Belém, Pará	01°23′05″S 048°28′44″W	
SBBG	BGX	Comandante Gustavo Kraemer Airport	Bagé, Rio Grande do Sul	31°23′27″S 054°06′35″W	
SBBH	PLU	Carlos Drummond de Andrade Airport	Belo Horizonte, Minas Gerais	19°51′07″S 043°57′02″W	
SBBI	BFH	Bacacheri Airport	Curitiba, Paraná	25°24′12″S 049°14′01″W	
SBBP	BJP	Bragança Paulista Airport	Bragança Paulista, São Paulo	22°58′44″S 046°32′14″W	
SBBQ	QAK	Barbacena Airport	Barbacena, Minas Gerais	21°16′02″S 043°45′38″W	
SBBR	BSB	Presidente Juscelino Kubitschek International Airport	Brasília, Federal District	15°52′16″S 047°55′07″W	
SBBU	BAU	Bauru Airport	Bauru, São Paulo	22°20′42″S 049°03′14″W	
SBBV	BVB	Boa Vista International Airport	Boa Vista, Roraima	02°50′29″N 060°41′32″W	
SBBW	BPG	Barra do Garças Airport	Barra do Garças, Mato Grosso	15°51′41″S 052°23′20″W	
SBBZ	BZC	Umberto Modiano Airport	Búzios, Rio de Janeiro	22°46′15″S 041°57′46″W	
SBCA	CAC	Cascavel Airport	Cascavel, Paraná	25°00′08″S 053°30′07″W	
SBCB	CFB	Cabo Frio International Airport	Cabo Frio, Rio de Janeiro	22°55′15″S 042°04′17″W	
SBCC	ITB	Cachimbo Airport	Itaituba, Pará	09°20′00″S 054°57′53″W	
SBCD	CFC	Caçador Airport (Carlos Alberto da Costa Neves Airport)	Caçador, Santa Catarina	26°47′17″S 050°56′24″W	
SBCF	CNF	Belo Horizonte International Airport	Belo Horizonte, Minas Gerais	19°37′28″S 043°58′19″W	
SBCG	CGR	Campo Grande International Airport	Campo Grande, Mato Grosso do Sul	20°28′10″S 054°40′13″W	
SBCH	XAP	Chapecó Airport	Chapecó, Santa Catarina	27°08′02″S 052°39′32″W	
SBCI	CLN	Carolina (Maranhão) Airport	Carolina, Maranhão	07°19′14″S 047°27′31″W	
SBCJ	CKS	Carajás Airport	Carajás Mine, Pará	06°07′04″S 050°00′12″W	
SBCN	CLV	Caldas Novas Airport	Caldas Novas / Rio Quente, Goiás	17°43′30″S 048°36′23″W	Formerly SWKN
SBCO	QNS	Canoas Air Force Base	Porto Alegre, Rio Grande do Sul	29°56′44″S 051°08′37″W	
SBCP	CAW	Bartolomeu Lysandro Airport	Campos, Rio de Janeiro	21°42′04″S 041°18′28″W	
SBCR	CMG	Corumbá International Airport	Corumbá, Mato Grosso do Sul	19°00′43″S 057°40′17″W	
SBCT	CWB	Afonso Pena International Airport	Curitiba, Paraná	25°31′54″S 049°10′34″W	
SBCV	CRQ	Caravelas Airport	Caravelas, Bahia	17°39′02″S 039°15′16″W	
SBCX	CXJ	Caxias do Sul Airport	Caxias do Sul, Rio Grande do Sul	29°11′53″S 051°11′12″W	
SBCY	CGB	Marechal Rondon Airport	Cuiabá, Mato Grosso	15°39′00″S 056°07′03″W	
SBCZ	CZS	Cruzeiro do Sul International Airport	Cruzeiro do Sul, Acre	07°35′58″S 072°46′10″W	
SBDB	BYO	Bonito Airport	Bonito, Mato Grosso do Sul	21°14′50″S 056°27′09″W	
SBDN	PPB	Presidente Prudente Airport	Presidente Prudente, São Paulo	22°10′30″S 051°25′28″W	
SBDO	DOU	Francisco de Matos Pereira Airport	Dourados, Mato Grosso do Sul	22°12′02″S 054°55′32″W	Formerly SSDO
SBEA		Dirad Heliport	Rio de Janeiro, Rio de Janeiro	22°52′04″S 043°22′15″W	
SBEC		Platform P15 Helipad	Macaé, Rio de Janeiro	22°40′39″S 040°36′22″W	
SBEG	MAO	Eduardo Gomes International Airport	Manaus, Amazonas	03°02′28″S 060°03′02″W	
SBEI		Petrobrás PRA-1 Helipad	Macaé, Rio de Janeiro	22°10′15″S 040°07′18″W	
SBEK	JCR	Jacare-Acanga Airport	Jacareacanga, Pará	06°14′07″S 057°46′33″W	
SBEN		Central de Enchova Fixed Platform PCE-1 Helipad	Macaé, Rio de Janeiro	22°42′29″S 040°41′35″W	
SBES		São Pedro da Aldeia Naval Air Base	São Pedro da Aldeia, Rio de Janeiro	22°49′00″S 042°05′33″W	
SBFI	IGU	Foz do Iguaçu International Airport (Cataratas Int'l)	Foz do Iguaçu, Paraná	25°36′01″S 054°29′06″W	
SBFL	FLN	Hercílio Luz International Airport	Florianópolis, Santa Catarina	27°40′13″S 048°33′09″W	
SBFN	FEN	Fernando de Noronha Airport	Fernando de Noronha, Pernambuco	03°51′17″S 032°25′42″W	
SBFS		Farol de São Tomé Airport	Campos dos Goytacazes, Rio de Janeiro	22°01′50″S 041°04′07″W	
SBFT		Frontiera Aerodrome	Fronteira, Minas Gerais	20°16′43″S 049°11′15″W	
SBFU		Furnas Aerodrome	São José da Barra, Minas Gerais	20°42′10″S 046°20′07″W	Closed
SBFZ	FOR	Fortaleza Airport	Fortaleza, Ceará	03°46′33″S 038°31′56″W	
SBGL	GIG	Rio de Janeiro/Galeão International Airport	Rio de Janeiro, Rio de Janeiro	22°48′36″S 043°15′02″W	
SBGM	GJM	Guajará-Mirim Airport	Guajará-Mirim, Rondônia	10°47′18″S 065°16′54″W	
SBGO	GYN	Santa Genoveva Airport	Goiânia, Goiás	16°37′57″S 049°13′16″W	
SBGP		Embraer Unidade Gavião Peixoto Airport	Gavião Peixoto, São Paulo	21°45′52″S 048°24′17″W	
SBGR	GRU	São Paulo/Guarulhos International Airport	São Paulo, São Paulo	23°26′08″S 046°28′23″W	
SBGS	PGZ	Ponta Grossa Airport	Ponta Grossa, Paraná	25°11′16″S 050°08′40″W	
SBGV	GVR	Cel. Altino Machado de Oliveira Airport	Governador Valadares, Minas Gerais	18°53′46″S 041°59′00″W	
SBGW	GUJ	Guaratinguetá Airport	Guaratinguetá, São Paulo	22°47′30″S 045°12′16″W	
SBHT	ATM	Altamira Airport	Altamira, Pará	03°15′03″S 052°15′08″W	
SBIC	ITA	Itacoatiara Airport	Itacoatiara, Amazonas	03°07′35″S 058°28′54″W	
SBIH	ITB	Itaituba Airport	Itaituba, Pará	04°14′32″S 056°00′03″W	
SBIL	IOS	Ilhéus Jorge Amado Airport	Ilhéus, Bahia	14°48′54″S 039°02′00″W	
SBIP	IPN	Usiminas Airport	Ipatinga, Minas Gerais	19°28′14″S 042°29′17″W	
SBIT	ITR	Itumbiara Airport	Itumbiara, Goiás	18°26′42″S 049°12′51″W	
SBIZ	IMP	Imperatriz Airport	Imperatriz, Maranhão	05°31′50″S 047°27′30″W	
SBJA	JJG	Jaguaruna Regional Airport	Jaguaruna, Santa Catarina	28°40′31″S 049°03′37″W	
SBJC		Protásio de Oliveira Airport	Belém, Pará	01°24′51″S 048°27′39″W	Closed
SBJD	QDV	Jundiaí Airport	Jundiaí, São Paulo	23°10′54″S 046°56′37″W	Formerly SDJD
SBJE	JJD	Comte. Ariston Pessoa Regional Airport	Jijoca de Jericoacoara / Cruz, Ceará	02°54′24″S 040°21′29″W	
SBJF	JDF	Francisco de Assis Airport	Juiz de Fora, Minas Gerais	21°47′35″S 043°23′08″W	
SBJH		São Paulo Catarina Executive Airport	São Roque, São Paulo	23°25′37″S 047°09′57″W	
SBJI	JPR	José Coleto Airport	Ji-Paraná, Rondônia	10°52′14″S 061°50′48″W	Formerly SWJI
SBJP	JPA	Presidente Castro Pinto International Airport	João Pessoa, Paraíba	07°08′54″S 034°57′01″W	
SBJR		Jacarepaguá Airport	Rio de Janeiro, Rio de Janeiro	22°59′15″S 043°22′12″W	
SBJU	JDO	Juazeiro do Norte Airport	Juazeiro do Norte, Ceará	07°13′09″S 039°16′10″W	
SBJV	JOI	Joinville-Lauro Carneiro de Loyola Airport	Joinville, Santa Catarina	26°13′23″S 048°47′52″W	
SBKG	CPV	Campina Grande Airport	Campina Grande, Paraíba	07°16′09″S 035°53′42″W	
SBKP	VCP	Viracopos International Airport	Campinas, São Paulo	23°00′25″S 047°08′04″W	
SBLB		Platform P-25 Helipad	Macaé, Rio de Janeiro	22°06′34″S 039°55′01″W	
SBLE	LEC	Cel. Horácio de Mattos Airport	Lençóis, Bahia	12°28′56″S 041°16′37″W	
SBLJ	LAJ	Lages Airport	Lages, Santa Catarina	27°46′56″S 050°16′54″W	
SBLO	LDB	Londrina Airport	Londrina, Paraná	23°19′49″S 051°08′12″W	
SBLP	LAZ	Bom Jesus da Lapa Airport	Bom Jesus da Lapa, Bahia	13°15′41″S 043°24′27″W	
SBLS		Lagoa Saanta Aeronautical Material Park	Lagoa Santa, Minas Gerais	19°39′40″S 043°53′52″W	Military
SBMA	MAB	Marabá Airport	Marabá, Pará	05°22′05″S 049°08′17″W	
SBMC	MQH	Minaçu Airport	Minaçu, Goiás	13°32′57″S 048°11′43″W	
SBMD	MEU	Monte Dourado Airport	Monte Dourado, Pará	00°53′23″S 052°36′08″W	
SBME	MEA	Macaé Airport	Macaé, Rio de Janeiro	22°20′30″S 041°45′58″W	
SBMG	MGF	Maringá - Sílvio Name Júnior Regional Airport	Maringá, Paraná	23°28′35″S 052°01′04″W	
SBMI		Maricá Airport	Maricá, Rio de Janeiro	22°55′05″S 042°49′44″W	Formerly SDMC
SBMK	MOC	Montes Claros Airport	Montes Claros, Minas Gerais	16°42′22″S 043°49′19″W	
SBML	MII	Marília Airport	Marília, São Paulo	22°11′49″S 049°55′35″W	
SBMM		Petrobrás 20 Helipad	Macaé, Rio de Janeiro	22°21′31″S 040°05′20″W	
SBMN	PLL	Manaus Air Force Base	Manaus, Amazonas	03°08′45″S 059°59′06″W	
SBMO	MCZ	Zumbi dos Palmares Airport (Campo dos Palmares)	Maceió, Alagoas	09°31′02″S 035°47′01″W	
SBMP		PAMPO 1 Platform PPM-1 Helipad	Macaé, Rio de Janeiro	22°47′46″S 040°45′50″W	
SBMQ	MCP	Macapá International Airport	Macapá, Amapá	00°03′02″N 051°04′20″W	
SBMS	MVF	Mossoró Airport	Mossoró, Rio Grande do Norte	05°11′45″S 037°21′42″W	
SBMT	RTE	Campo de Marte Airport	São Paulo, São Paulo	23°30′33″S 046°38′15″W	
SBMY	MNX	Manicoré Airport	Manicoré, Amazonas	05°48′40″S 061°16′42″W	
SBNA		Namorado 2 Platform PNA-2 Helipad	Macaé, Rio de Janeiro	22°22′24″S 040°24′47″W	
SBNF	NVT	Navegantes Airport	Navegantes, Santa Catarina	26°52′43″S 048°39′03″W	
SBNM	GEL	Santo Ângelo Airport	Santo Ângelo, Rio Grande do Sul	28°16′54″S 054°10′06″W	
SBNT		Natal Air Force Base	Natal, Rio Grande do Norte	05°54′30″S 035°14′57″W	
SBNV		Aeródromo Nacional de Aviação	Goiânia, Goiás	16°37′32″S 049°20′58″W	
SBOA		Antas Farm Aerodrome	Sapé, Paraíba	06°58′24″S 035°15′12″W	
SBOB		Buriti Farm Aerodrome	Unaí, Minas Gerais	16°19′21″S 047°13′24″W	
SBOD		Santa Cruz Farm Aerodrome	Araguaína, Tocantins	07°27′21″S 049°11′14″W	
SBOE		Americana Farm Aerodrome	Querência, Mato Grosso	12°35′14″S 052°05′47″W	
SBOF		Bandeirantes Farm Aerodrome	Chapadão do Sul, Mato Grosso do Sul	19°19′05″S 052°32′03″W	
SBOG		Vereda Grande Farm Airport	Periperi, Bahia	14°47′05″S 040°49′01″W	
SBOH		São Sebastião Farm Aerodrome	Tesouro, Mato Grosso	15°59′57″S 053°32′36″W	
SBOI	OYK	Oiapoque Airport	Oiapoque, Amapá	03°51′41″N 051°47′46″W	
SBOJ		Crepurizão Aerodrome	Itaituba, Pará	06°49′12″S 056°50′29″W	
SBOK		São Vicente Farm Aerodrome	Lucas do Rio Verde, Mato Grosso	13°17′26″S 055°58′30″W	
SBOL		Santa Lúcia Farm Aerodrome	Aporé, Goiás	18°55′13″S 052°00′05″W	
SBOM		Santa Maria Farm Aerodrome	Lambari d'Oeste, Mato Grosso	15°22′38″S 057°40′55″W	
SBON		Renascer Farm Aerodrome	Goiatins, Tocantins	07°36′56″S 047°27′06″W	
SBOO		Ceita Corê Farm Aerodrome	Bonito, Mato Grosso do Sul	20°50′19″S 056°35′19″W	
SBOP		Arena Corinthians Heliport	São Paulo, São Paulo	23°32′39″S 046°28′40″W	
SBOQ		Irmãs Prata Farm Aerodrome	Chapadão do Céu, Goiás	18°37′16″S 052°49′59″W	
SBOR		Agro Tamareira Farm Aerodrome	Mundo Novo, Goiás	13°43′49″S 050°21′29″W	
SBOS		Santo Augusto Farm Aerodrome	Brasnorte, Mato Grosso	13°09′10″S 058°07′03″W	
SBOT		Eldorado Farm Aerodrome	Igarapé do Meio, Maranhão	03°41′31″S 045°16′08″W	
SBOU		São Jerônimo Farm Aerodrome	Nova Canaã do Norte, Mato Grosso	10°16′13″S 055°47′10″W	
SBOV		Tabatinga Farm Aerodrome	Santa Rita do Trivelato, Mato Grosso	14°09′34″S 054°55′36″W	
SBOW		Vale do Ouro Farm Aerodrome	Itaituba, Pará	04°11′12″S 056°03′29″W	
SBOX		Baia Morena Farm Aerodrome	Corumbá, Mato Grosso do Sul	18°15′36″S 055°22′28″W	
SBOY		São José Farm Aerodrome	Corumbá, Mato Grosso do Sul	17°25′06″S 056°10′47″W	
SBOZ		Arizona Farm Aerodrome	Cáceres, Mato Grosso	16°10′48″S 057°16′42″W	
SBPA	POA	Salgado Filho International Airport	Porto Alegre, Rio Grande do Sul	29°59′41″S 051°10′16″W	
SBPB	PHB	Parnaíba-Prefeito Dr. João Silva Filho International Airport	Piauí, Parnaíba	02°53′36″S 041°43′49″W	
SBPC	POO	Poços de Caldas Airport	Poços de Caldas, Minas Gerais	21°50′33″S 046°34′10″W	
SBPF	PFB	Lauro Kurtz Airport	Passo Fundo, Rio Grande do Sul	28°14′39″S 052°19′42″W	
SBPG	PNG	Paranaguá Airport	Paranaguá, Paraná	25°11′04″S 050°08′38″W	
SBPJ	PMW	Palmas Airport	Palmas, Tocantins	10°17′24″S 048°21′28″W	
SBPK	PET	Pelotas International Airport	Pelotas, Rio Grande do Sul	31°42′58″S 052°19′52″W	
SBPL	PNZ	Petrolina Airport	Petrolina, Pernambuco	09°22′03″S 040°33′49″W	
SBPN	PNB	Porto Nacional Airport	Porto Nacional, Goiás	10°43′10″S 048°23′59″W	
SBPO	PTO	Juvenal Loureiro Cardoso Airport	Pato Branco, Paraná	26°13′02″S 052°41′40″W	Formerly SSPB
SBPP	PMG	Ponta Porã International Airport	Ponta Porã, Mato Grosso do Sul	22°32′59″S 055°42′11″W	
SBPR		Carlos Prates Airport	Belo Horizonte, Minas Gerais	19°54′33″S 043°59′27″W	Closed
SBPS	BPS	Porto Seguro Airport	Porto Seguro, Bahia	16°26′17″S 039°04′40″W	
SBPV	PVH	Governador Jorge Teixeira de Oliveira International Airport	Porto Velho, Rondônia	08°42′49″S 063°54′10″W	
SBPW		Porto do Açu Heliport	São João da Barra, Rio de Janeiro	21°48′15″S 041°06′32″W	
SBQA		Floresta Farm Aerodrome	Nazário, Goiás	16°32′10″S 049°50′18″W	
SBQB		Pedrinhas II Farm Aerodrome	Correntina, Bahia	13°16′10″S 045°05′06″W	
SBQC		Cantagalo Farm Aerodrome	Nova Mutum, Mato Grosso	13°21′59″S 055°51′18″W	
SBQD		Vaca Branca Farm Aerodrome	Alta Floresta, Mato Grosso	09°31′24″S 056°14′18″W	
SBQE		Tradição Farm Aerodrome	Ribeiro Gonçalves, Piauí	07°48′14″S 045°03′27″W	
SBQF		Ferigolo Heliport	Nova Palma, Rio Grande do Sul	29°27′42″S 053°27′49″W	
SBQG		Rio Azul Farm Aerodrome	São José do Rio Claro, Mato Grosso	13°30′47″S 056°35′54″W	
SBQH		Cmte. Juliano Rambo Aerodrome	Confresa, Mato Grosso	10°41′56″S 051°36′56″W	
SBQI		Caracarai Air Base	Caracaraí, Roraima	01°50′39″N 061°07′17″W	
SBQJ		Osvaldo de Carvalho Aerodrome	Ibaiti, Paraná	23°50′47″S 050°12′30″W	
SBQK		Mundial Farm Aerodrome	São Félix do Xingu, Pará	06°32′20″S 051°26′31″W	
SBQL		Ponta da Praia Convention Centre Heliport	Santos, São Paulo	23°59′05″S 046°17′40″W	
SBQM		São Miguel Farm Aerodrome	Jateí, Mato Grosso do Sul	22°45′55″S 053°54′30″W	
SBQN		Nossa Senhora Aparecida II Farm Aerodrome	Porto Estrela, Mato Grosso	15°34′31″S 057°22′41″W	
SBQO		Paraíso Farm Aerodrome	Prado, Bahia	17°01′39″S 039°10′34″W	
SBQP		Três Santos Farm Aerodrome	Uruçuí, Piauí	07°45′00″S 044°18′59″W	
SBQQ		Comandante Gravatá Heliport	Angra dos Reis, Rio de Janeiro	23°01′07″S 044°19′10″W	
SBQR		Arena de Aço Farm Aerodrome	Buritizeiro, Minas Gerais	16°48′30″S 044°58′25″W	
SBQS		Santa Rosa Aerodrome	Campo Verde, Mato Grosso	15°24′27″S 054°57′56″W	
SBQT		Campo Formoso Farm Aerodrome	Tesouro, Mato Grosso	15°48′07″S 053°33′28″W	
SBQU		Hungaro Helipark	Araguaína, Tocantins	07°12′15″S 048°13′11″W	
SBQV	VDC	Pedro Otacílio Figueiredo Airport	Vitória da Conquista, Bahia	14°51′49″S 040°51′47″W	Closed
SBQW		Paíto Motors Heliport	Araras, São Paulo	22°21′20″S 047°22′25″W	
SBQY		LDB Itapevi Heliport	Itapevi, São Paulo	23°31′49″S 046°56′14″W	
SBQZ		Mariane Farm Aerodrome	Brotas, São Paulo	22°14′25″S 048°19′09″W	
SBRB	RBR	Rio Branco International Airport(Presidente Medici Airport)	Rio Branco, Acre	09°52′06″S 067°53′53″W	
SBRC		Petrobrás Platform P-52 Helipad	Macaé, Rio de Janeiro	21°54′18″S 039°44′14″W	
SBRD	RBR	Maestro Marinho Franco Airport	Rondonópolis, Mato Grosso	16°35′17″S 054°43′18″W	Formerly SWRD
SBRF	REC	Guararapes International Airport (Gilberto Freyre Int'l)	Recife, Pernambuco	08°07′35″S 034°55′22″W	
SBRG	RIG	Rio Grande Airport	Rio Grande, Rio Grande do Sul	32°04′57″S 052°10′00″W	
SBRJ	SDU	Santos Dumont Airport	Rio de Janeiro, Rio de Janeiro	22°54′36″S 043°09′45″W	
SBRP	RAO	Leite Lopes Airport	Ribeirão Preto, São Paulo	21°08′11″S 047°46′36″W	
SBSC	SNZ	Santa Cruz Air Force Base	Santa Cruz, Rio de Janeiro	22°55′58″S 043°43′10″W	
SBSG	NAT	Greater Natal International Airport	Natal / São Gonçalo do Amarante, Rio Grande do Norte	05°46′08″S 035°21′59″W	
SBSI	OPS	Sinop Airport	Sinop, Mato Grosso	11°53′06″S 055°35′10″W	Formerly SWSI
SBSJ	SJK	São José dos Campos Regional Airport	São José dos Campos, São Paulo	23°13′44″S 045°52′16″W	
SBSL	SLZ	Marechal Cunha Machado International Airport	São Luís, Maranhão	02°35′13″S 044°14′10″W	
SBSM	RIA	Santa Maria Airport	Santa Maria, Rio Grande do Sul	29°42′39″S 053°41′32″W	
SBSN	STM	Santarém-Maestro Wilson Fonseca Airport	Santarém, Pará	02°25′29″S 054°47′09″W	Formerly SBWX
SBSO	SMT	Adolino Bedin Regional Airport	Sorriso, Mato Grosso	12°28′22″S 055°40′08″W	
SBSP	CGH	São Paulo–Congonhas Airport	São Paulo, São Paulo	23°37′34″S 046°39′23″W	
SBSR	SJP	São José do Rio Preto Airport	São José do Rio Preto, São Paulo	20°49′02″S 049°24′25″W	
SBST	SSZ	Santos Air Force Base	Santos, São Paulo	23°55′41″S 046°17′59″W	
SBSV	SSA	Deputado Luís Eduardo Magalhães International Airport (Dois de Julho Airport)	Salvador, Bahia	12°54′31″S 038°19′21″W	
SBTA	QHP	Taubaté Air Base	Taubaté, São Paulo	23°02′20″S 045°30′57″W	
SBTB	TMT	Porto Trombetas Airport	Trombetas, Pará	01°29′23″S 056°23′49″W	
SBTC	UNA	Una-Comandatuba Airport	Una, Bahia	15°21′12″S 038°59′50″W	
SBTD	TOW	Luiz dal Canalle Filho Airport	Toledo, Paraná, Paraná	24°41′07″S 053°41′47″W	
SBTE	THE	Teresina Airport	Teresina, Piauí	05°03′38″S 042°49′28″W	
SBTF	TFF	Tefé Airport	Tefé, Amazonas	03°22′49″S 064°43′31″W	
SBTG	TJL	Três Lagoas Airport	Três Lagoas, Mato Grosso do Sul	20°45′05″S 051°40′49″W	
SBTK	TRQ	Tarauacá Airport	Tarauacá, Acre	08°09′17″S 070°46′58″W	
SBTS		Tirios Aerodrome	Óbidos, Pará	02°13′29″N 055°56′33″W	
SBTT	TBT	Tabatinga International Airport	Tabatinga, Amazonas	04°15′02″S 069°56′16″W	
SBTU	TUR	Tucuruí Airport	Tucuruí, Pará	03°46′37″S 049°43′11″W	
SBTV		Terravista Airport	Porto Seguro, Bahia	16°32′29″S 039°06′29″W	
SBUA	SJL	São Gabriel da Cachoeira Airport	São Gabriel da Cachoeira, Amazonas	00°08′53″S 066°59′09″W	
SBUF	PAV	Paulo Afonso Airport	Paulo Afonso, Bahia	09°24′04″S 038°15′04″W	
SBUG	URG	Ruben Berta International Airport	Uruguaiana, Rio Grande do Sul	29°47′00″S 057°02′13″W	
SBUL	UDI	Uberlândia Airport	Uberlândia, Minas Gerais	18°53′01″S 048°13′31″W	
SBUP	URB	Urubupungá Airport	Urubupungá, São Paulo	20°46′37″S 051°33′53″W	Closed
SBUR	UBA	Uberaba Airport	Uberaba, Minas Gerais	19°45′53″S 047°57′58″W	
SBUY	RPU	Porto Urucu Airport	Coari, Amazonas	04°52′59″S 065°21′21″W	
SBVC	VDC	Glauber Rocha Airport	Vitória da Conquista, Bahia	14°54′28″S 040°54′53″W	
SBVG	VAG	Major-Brigadeiro Trompowsky Airport	Varginha, Minas Gerais	21°35′20″S 045°28′24″W	
SBVH	BVH	Vilhena Airport	Vilhena, Rondônia	12°41′40″S 060°05′54″W	
SBVT	VIX	Eurico de Aguiar Salles Airport	Vitória, Espírito Santo	20°15′29″S 040°17′11″W	
SBXI		Cachimbo-in-Pará Aerodrome	Novo Progresso, Pará	09°21′22″S 054°54′38″W	
SBYA		Iauaretê Airport	São Gabriel da Cachoeira, Amazonas	00°36′37″N 069°10′48″W	
SBYS	QPS	Campo Fontenelle Airport	Pirassununga, São Paulo	21°59′04″S 047°20′39″W	
SBZM	IZA	Zona da Mata Regional Airport	Juiz de Fora, Zona da Mata	21°30′47″S 043°10′23″W	

== SC - Chile ==
Also see airport category and list.

ICAO	IATA	Airport name	Community	Coordinates	Notes
SCAA		Añorada Airport	Frutillar	41°02′35″S 073°02′51″W	Closed
SCAB		El Alba Airport	Melipilla	33°39′31″S 071°17′25″W	
SCAC	ZUD	Pupelde Airport	Ancud	41°54′15″S 073°47′48″W	
SCAD		Santa Adriana Airport	Ovalle	30°37′45″S 071°16′25″W	
SCAE		El Buitre Airfield	Arica	18°30′31″S 070°17′20″W	Military
SCAF		San Alfonso Airport	Alhué	34°03′37″S 071°15′11″W	Closed
SCAG		Agua Santa Airport	Palmilla	34°33′05″S 071°20′08″W	
SCAH		Tolquién Airport	Achao	42°27′00″S 073°31′30″W	
SCAI		Curacautin Airport	Curacautin	38°25′53″S 071°55′23″W	
SCAJ		Las Alpacas Airport	Parral	36°08′43″S 071°45′50″W	
SCAK		Atacalco Airport	Recinto	36°55′10″S 071°34′40″W	
SCAL		Valchac Aerodrome	Cochrane	47°06′55″S 072°28′43″W	
SCAM		Alempue Airport	Teno	34°51′55″S 071°06′00″W	Closed
SCAN	LOB	San Rafael Airport	Los Andes	32°48′50″S 070°38′48″W	
SCAO		Palo Alto Airport	Lolol	34°43′57″S 071°44′30″W	
SCAP	WAP	Alto Palena Airfield	Alto Palena	43°36′41″S 071°48′20″W	
SCAQ		Arquilhue Airport	Lago Ranco	40°11′54″S 072°01′50″W	
SCAR	ARI	Chacalluta International Airport	Arica	18°20′55″S 070°20′20″W	
SCAS	WPA	Cabo Juan Román Airfield	Puerto Aysén	45°23′56″S 072°40′10″W	
SCAT	CPO	Desierto de Atacama Airport	Copiapó	27°15′40″S 070°46′45″W	
SCAU		Juan Enrique Airport	Paine	33°53′35″S 070°53′07″W	
SCAV		Achibueno Airport	Linares	36°08′30″S 071°22′27″W	
SCAY		Ayacara Airport	Ayacara	42°18′27″S 072°47′15″W	
SCAZ		Azopardo Airport	Timaukel	54°28′53″S 068°56′25″W	
SCBA	BBA	Balmaceda Airport	Balmaceda	45°54′58″S 071°41′15″W	
SCBB		Del Bío Bío Airport	Negrete	37°35′14″S 072°30′13″W	
SCBC		Cacique Blanco Airport	Lago Verde	44°13′48″S 071°51′10″W	
SCBD		El Boldal Airport	Santa Cruz	34°40′45″S 071°17′10″W	
SCBE	TOQ	Barriles Airport	Tocopilla	22°08′25″S 070°03′45″W	
SCBI	DPB	Pampa Guanaco Airport	Bahía Inútil	54°03′00″S 068°48′30″W	
SCBN		Cotreumo Airport	Río Bueno	40°24′00″S 072°39′39″W	
SCBQ		El Bosque Airport	El Bosque, Santiago	33°33′39″S 070°41′15″W	
SCBR		Lago Brown Airport	Lago Brown	47°23′19″S 072°19′35″W	
SCBS		Posesión Airport	Bahía Posesión	52°17′33″S 068°56′00″W	
SCBT		Rincón Bonito Airport	Cochamó	42°01′36″S 072°05′57″W	
SCBU		Bureo Airport	Retiro	35°52′18″S 071°49′55″W	
SCBV		Bellavista Airport	Río Claro	35°11′10″S 071°17′45″W	
SCCA		El Boldo Airport	Cauquenes	35°58′15″S 072°13′30″W	
SCCB		Combarbalá Airport	Combarbalá	31°13′15″S 071°04′15″W	
SCCC	CCH	Chile Chico Airfield	Chile Chico	46°34′55″S 071°41′15″W	
SCCD		Los Condores Airport	Iquique	20°15′20″S 070°05′21″W	Closed
SCCE		El Arenal Airport	Cauquenes	35°53′47″S 072°03′21″W	Closed
SCCF	CJC	El Loa Airport	Calama	22°29′50″S 068°54′25″W	
SCCG		Cogoti La Pelicana Airport	Combarbalá	31°04′02″S 070°57′20″W	
SCCH	YAI	General Bernardo O'Higgins Airport	Chillán	36°35′00″S 072°01′57″W	
SCCI	PUQ	Presidente Carlos Ibáñez del Campo International Airport	Punta Arenas	53°00′09″S 070°51′16″W	
SCCK		Contao Airport	Contao	41°48′00″S 072°43′17″W	
SCCL		Caldera Airport	Caldera	27°04′40″S 070°47′45″W	
SCCM		Molco Airport	Choshuenco	39°49′28″S 072°04′55″W	
SCCN		Alto Cauquenes Airport	Cauquenes	35°52′50″S 072°19′38″W	
SCCO		Hacienda Cotrilla Airport	Paillaco	40°11′10″S 072°46′03″W	Closed
SCCP		Callipulli Airport	Osorno	40°37′11″S 072°50′47″W	Closed
SCCQ		Tambillos Airport	Coquimbo	30°11′56″S 071°14′49″W	Closed
SCCR		Caleta Tortel Airport	Caleta Tortel	47°47′12″S 073°31′57″W	
SCCS		Santa Rita Airport	Casablanca	33°16′35″S 071°27′20″W	
SCCT		Quivolgo Airport	Constitución, Chile	35°18′30″S 072°23′30″W	
SCCU		Lolco Airport	Lonquimay	38°09′30″S 071°25′29″W	
SCCV		Curacaví Airport	Curacaví	33°24′45″S 071°09′55″W	
SCCY	GXQ	Teniente Vidal Airfield	Coyhaique	45°35′40″S 072°06′24″W	
SCDA	IQQ	Diego Aracena International Airport	Iquique	20°32′08″S 070°10′53″W	
SCDD		Don Dobri Airport	Puerto Varas	41°14′05″S 072°30′54″W	
SCDG		Don Aliro García Airport	La Estrella	34°11′38″S 071°34′05″W	Closed
SCDH		Vodudahue Airport	Chaitén	42°29′20″S 072°21′05″W	
SCDI		Pichidangui Airport	Pichidangui	32°08′47″S 071°30′30″W	
SCDK		Domeyko Airfield	Domeyko	28°58′03″S 070°55′23″W	Closed
SCDL		El Algarrobo Airport	Cabildo	32°28′20″S 070°59′34″W	
SCDM		San Damián Airport	Vichuquén	34°52′44″S 072°08′45″W	
SCDQ		San Lorenzo Airport	Quilleco	37°31′35″S 071°43′25″W	
SCDS		San Andrés Airport	Retiro	35°59′47″S 071°46′10″W	
SCDW		Almirante Schroeders Airport	Isla Dawson	53°36′40″S 070°28′15″W	
SCEA		El Amarillo Airport	Chaitén	43°00′25″S 072°28′44″W	
SCEB		Entrada Baker Airport	Entrada Baker	47°10′00″S 071°59′33″W	
SCEC		Pelicano Airport	Estación Chañar	29°08′40″S 070°53′16″W	
SCED		Los Cedros Airport	Sagrada Familia	35°09′20″S 071°36′20″W	
SCEG		El Corte Airport	Talagante	33°42′35″S 070°54′55″W	
SCEH		El Huachi Airport	Santa Bárbara	37°38′50″S 071°45′15″W	Closed
SCEI		Potrerillos Airport	Diego de Almagro	26°22′48″S 069°28′27″W	
SCEK		Chepica Airport	Chépica	34°44′19″S 071°19′28″W	Closed
SCEL	SCL	Arturo Merino Benítez International Airport	Santiago	33°23′34″S 070°47′08″W	
SCEO		El Salto Airport	Parral	36°07′45″S 071°51′30″W	
SCEP		El Principal Airport	Pirque	33°43′30″S 070°30′40″W	
SCER		Quintero Airport	Valparaíso	32°47′30″S 071°31′15″W	
SCES	ESR	Ricardo García Posada Airport	El Salvador	26°18′40″S 069°45′55″W	
SCET		San Vicente de Tagua Tagua Airport	San Vicente de Tagua Tagua	34°28′30″S 071°00′50″W	Closed
SCEV	FRT	El Avellano Airport	Frutillar	41°03′06″S 073°21′04″W	
SCEX		Río Exploradores Airport	Aysén	46°21′13″S 073°19′40″W	
SCEY		Entrada Mayer Airport	Entrada Mayer	48°12′05″S 072°19′40″W	
SCFA	ANF	Cerro Moreno International Airport	Antofagasta	23°26′40″S 070°26′42″W	
SCFC		Fachinal Airport	Fachinal	46°32′55″S 072°13′10″W	
SCFF		Freirina Airport	Freirina	28°31′35″S 071°03′47″W	
SCFI		Fundo Tehuén Airport	Frutillar	41°05′32″S 073°07′38″W	
SCFJ		Fray Jorge Airport	Ovalle	30°40′50″S 071°34′40″W	
SCFK		Chillán Fundo El Carmen Airport	Chillán	36°38′30″S 072°00′45″W	
SCFL		Fundo Loma Larga Airport	Casablanca, Chile	33°16′45″S 071°22′40″W	
SCFM	WPR	Capitán Fuentes Martinez Airport	Porvenir	53°15′13″S 070°19′09″W	
SCFN		Russfin Airport	Timaukel	53°47′55″S 069°07′10″W	
SCFO		La Reforma Airport	Pelarco	35°27′30″S 071°16′50″W	
SCFR		Frutillar Airport	Frutillar	41°07′45″S 073°03′52″W	
SCFS		Los Calafates Airport	Chonchi	42°40′42″S 073°53′45″W	
SCFT	FFU	Futaleufú Airfield	Futaleufú	43°11′20″S 071°51′00″W	
SCFU		Loncopan Airport	Futrono	40°03′55″S 072°32′25″W	
SCFX		Isla San Felix Airport	Isla San Felix	26°17′38″S 080°05′45″W	
SCGA		Punta Galera Airport	La Unión	40°00′10″S 073°41′50″W	
SCGB		Guadaba Airport	Los Sauces	37°58′42″S 072°55′45″W	
SCGD		Cerro Guido Airport	Torres del Paine	50°58′12″S 072°25′10″W	
SCGE	LSQ	María Dolores Airport	Los Ángeles	37°24′05″S 072°25′30″W	
SCGF		Golfo Azul Airport	Futrono	40°08′27″S 072°17′01″W	
SCGH		Cholguahue Airport	Los Ángeles	37°28′15″S 072°08′18″W	
SCGI		San Guillermo Airport	Retiro, Chile	36°00′00″S 071°49′42″W	
SCGL		Las Agullas Airport	Rapel, Chile	34°10′10″S 071°31′55″W	
SCGM		Los Gomeros Airport	Rengo	34°21′40″S 070°52′55″W	
SCGN		Caleta Gonzalo Airport	Chaitén	42°33′50″S 072°35′57″W	
SCGO		Angol Los Confines Airport	Angol	37°47′35″S 072°41′15″W	
SCGP		Curaco Airport	Panguipulli	39°32′14″S 072°21′23″W	Closed
SCGR		El Manso Airport	Llanada Grande	41°44′33″S 071°54′37″W	
SCGS		Siberia Airport	Cholguán	37°10′25″S 072°03′55″W	
SCGU		Aguas Blancas Airport	Aguas Blancas	24°07′20″S 069°50′50″W	
SCGV		Punta Gaviota Airport	Caleta Chañaral	29°05′04″S 071°28′02″W	
SCGY		Los Guayes Airport	Cunco, Chile	39°03′05″S 071°59′38″W	
SCGZ	WPU	Guardia Marina Zañartu Airport	Puerto Williams	54°55′52″S 067°37′35″W	
SCHA	CPO	Chamonate Airport	Copiapó	27°17′48″S 070°24′50″W	
SCHC		Chicureo Airport	Santiago	33°16′12″S 070°39′00″W	
SCHD		Chumildén Airport	Chaitén	42°31′29″S 072°48′55″W	
SCHE		Rucamanqui Airport	Huépil	37°12′00″S 071°53′46″W	
SCHF		Chufquen Airport	Traiguén	38°21′35″S 072°41′05″W	
SCHG		Almahue Airport	Pichidegua	34°23′55″S 071°22′20″W	
SCHH		Punta Baja Airport	General Carrera Lake	46°47′35″S 072°47′45″W	
SCHK		Hueicomilla Airport	Hueicolla	40°09′35″S 073°39′11″W	
SCHL		Hacienda Lipangue Airport	Lampa	33°20′10″S 070°54′58″W	
SCHM		Punta El Saco Airport	Isla Mocha	38°24′40″S 073°54′20″W	
SCHN		Chan Chan Airport	Choshuenco	39°51′55″S 072°07′50″W	
SCHO		Punta Chungo Airport	Los Vilos	31°53′05″S 071°28′47″W	
SCHP		Copihue Airport	Retiro	36°04′40″S 071°46′50″W	
SCHR	LGR	Cochrane Airport	Cochrane	47°14′36″S 072°35′10″W	
SCHT		Tic Toc Airport	Chaitén	43°36′47″S 072°53′50″W	
SCHU		Gran Cañon Airport	Carrizal Bajo	28°05′57″S 071°08′45″W	
SCHW		Hualaihué Airport	Hualaihué	42°01′35″S 072°41′28″W	
SCIA		Isla Apiao Airport	Isla Apiao	42°36′20″S 073°12′33″W	
SCIB		Butachauques Airport	Isla Butachauques	42°18′35″S 073°08′30″W	
SCIC	ZCQ	General Freire Airport	Curicó	34°57′55″S 071°12′58″W	
SCID		Marco Davison Bascur Airport	Punta Arenas	52°52′50″S 070°45′00″W	
SCIE	CCP	Carriel Sur International Airport	Concepción	36°46′21″S 073°03′47″W	
SCIF		Chollinco Airport	Llifén	40°12′19″S 072°13′55″W	
SCIH		Caleta Blanco Airport	Isla Las Huichas	45°08′55″S 073°30′48″W	
SCII		Puerto Ingeniero Ibáñez Airport	Puerto Ingeniero Ibáñez	46°17′35″S 071°57′00″W	
SCIK		Isla Talcan Airport	Isla Talcan	42°44′40″S 072°58′00″W	
SCIL		Aucó Airport	Illapel	31°34′40″S 071°06′39″W	
SCIM		Isla Mocha Airport	Isla Mocha	38°23′05″S 073°52′07″W	
SCIN		Colina Air Base	Colina	33°13′09″S 070°41′29″W	
SCIO		Laguna Redonda Airport	Villa O'Higgins	48°56′00″S 072°48′00″W	
SCIP	IPC	Mataveri International Airport	Easter Island (Isla de Pascua)	27°09′53″S 109°25′18″W	
SCIR		Robinson Crusoe Airport	Juan Fernández Islands	33°40′00″S 078°55′43″W	
SCIS		Puerto Sur Airport	Isla Santa María	37°01′45″S 073°30′30″W	
SCIT		Iván Martínez Airport	Isla Tierra del Fuego	52°58′05″S 070°01′00″W	
SCIV		Panimávida Airport	Panimávida	35°45′40″S 071°24′22″W	Closed
SCJC		James Conrad Airport	Ranguelmo	36°34′50″S 072°46′25″W	
SCJK		Juan Kemp Airport	Osorno, Chile	40°53′23″S 072°22′20″W	
SCJO	ZOS	Canal Bajo Carlos Hott Siebert Airport	Osorno	40°36′40″S 073°03′38″W	
SCJS		José Abel Sepúlveda Airport	Ñiquén	36°14′03″S 072°03′34″W	
SCJV		El Parrón Airport	San Javier	35°32′53″S 071°46′34″W	Closed
SCKA		San Carlos Santa Marta Airport	San Carlos	36°29′26″S 071°53′25″W	
SCKB		Llolle Norte Airport	Cunco	39°03′39″S 071°41′14″W	
SCKD		El Cardal Airport	Río Bueno	40°28′02″S 072°41′00″W	
SCKE		Piedra Negra Airport	Pelluhue	35°51′15″S 072°38′45″W	
SCKI		Los Lirios Airport	Curicó	34°54′25″S 071°12′10″W	
SCKK		La Cascada Airport	Molina	35°23′07″S 071°06′20″W	
SCKL		Lipangui Airport	Lampa	33°20′10″S 070°51′05″W	
SCKM		Cochamó Airport	Cochamó	41°28′55″S 072°18′27″W	
SCKN		Licancel Airport	Licantén	34°59′20″S 072°01′12″W	
SCKO		Agua Buena Airport	Collipulli	37°59′38″S 072°15′00″W	
SCKP		Coposa Airport	Coposa	20°45′00″S 068°41′00″W	
SCKQ		Curimanques Airport	Pucón	39°19′37″S 072°01′35″W	
SCKT		Torreón Airport	Coelemu	36°30′00″S 072°40′44″W	
SCLA		Lautaro Airport	Lautaro	38°32′34″S 072°25′19″W	Closed
SCLB		Los Pehuenches Airport	Lebu	37°39′25″S 073°37′42″W	
SCLC		Municipal de Vitacura Airport	Santiago	33°22′50″S 070°34′55″W	
SCLD		Llanada Grande Airport	Llanada Grande	41°52′10″S 071°56′22″W	
SCLE		La Escondida Airport	Antofagasta	24°17′40″S 069°07′45″W	
SCLF		Calcuruppe Airport	Llifén	40°14′35″S 072°14′54″W	
SCLG		La Aguada Airport	Pencahue	35°21′02″S 071°47′00″W	
SCLI		Torca Airport	Llico, Vichuquén	34°47′00″S 072°03′04″W	
SCLJ		La Junta Airport	La Junta	43°58′35″S 072°24′45″W	
SCLK		Lago Colico Airport	Cunco	39°03′25″S 072°04′35″W	
SCLL	VLR	Vallenar Airport	Vallenar	28°35′47″S 070°45′22″W	
SCLM		Las Mercedes Airport	San Javier	35°29′30″S 071°52′50″W	
SCLN	ZLR	Linares Airport	Linares, Chile	35°51′40″S 071°32′52″W	
SCLO		Leones Airport	General Carrera Lake	46°45′57″S 072°49′05″W	
SCLQ		Diego Portales Airport	La Ligua	32°26′55″S 071°15′30″W	
SCLR		Los Alerces Airport	Chaitén	42°46′51″S 072°38′40″W	
SCLS		Esperanza Airport	Lautaro	38°32′55″S 072°08′50″W	
SCLT		Topocalma Airport	Litueche	34°06′44″S 071°56′20″W	
SCLU		La Laguna Airport	Marchigüe	34°21′05″S 071°39′50″W	
SCLV		La Viña Airport	Guangualí	32°08′25″S 071°23′53″W	
SCLY		La Playa Airport	Laraquete	37°13′00″S 073°14′00″W	
SCMA		Puerto Marín Balmaceda Airport	Puerto Marin Balmaceda	43°47′15″S 072°57′05″W	
SCMB		La Chimba Airport	Antofagasta	23°33′13″S 070°23′46″W	Closed
SCMC		Meseta Cosmelli Airport	Puerto Guadal	46°44′47″S 072°31′35″W	
SCME		Cuatro Diablos Airport	Melipilla	33°40′38″S 071°06′35″W	
SCMF		Malloco Airport	Villarrica	39°15′21″S 072°20′36″W	
SCMG		Santa María de Mingre Airport	San Javier	35°34′15″S 072°00′15″W	
SCMH		La Esperanza Airport	Marchigüe	34°17′20″S 071°33′03″W	
SCMI		Los Tricahues Airport	Mialqui	30°44′26″S 070°51′55″W	
SCMK		Melinka Airport	Melinka	43°53′40″S 073°44′20″W	
SCML		Melipeuco Airport	Melipeuco	38°51′22″S 071°48′45″W	
SCMN		Mónaco Aerodrome	Pichilemu	34°15′49″S 071°58′03″W	
SCMO		Los Monos Airport	Molina	35°11′25″S 071°25′10″W	
SCMP		Melipilla Airport	Melipilla	33°40′35″S 071°11′35″W	
SCMR		Las Aguilas Oriente Airport	Rapel	34°09′12″S 071°30′53″W	
SCMS		Las Moras Airport	Longaví	36°00′37″S 071°35′40″W	
SCMU		Panilonco Aerodrome	Pichilemu	34°17′07″S 071°56′55″W	
SCMV		Viña San Pedro Airport	Molina	35°06′25″S 071°19′45″W	
SCMY		Carolina Airport	Michilla	22°42′15″S 070°16′50″W	
SCMZ		Marina de Rapel Airport	El Manzano	34°09′20″S 071°27′22″W	
SCNA		Fundo La Caña Airport	Linares	35°58′28″S 071°36′05″W	
SCND		Ñadis Airport	Ñadis	47°28′15″S 072°55′50″W	
SCNE		María Elena Airport	María Elena	22°18′12″S 069°42′20″W	Closed
SCNG		Papageno Airport	Panguipulli	39°32′59″S 072°17′28″W	Closed
SCNH		Ainhoa Airport	Vilcún	38°40′59″S 072°14′38″W	
SCNI		San Nicolás Santa Eugena Airport	San Nicolás	36°26′15″S 072°09′35″W	
SCNK		Los Pelambres Airport	Salamanca	31°52′15″S 070°37′03″W	
SCNM		Las Misiones Airport	Cañete	37°46′31″S 073°23′00″W	
SCNO		Ñochaco Airport	Puerto Octay	40°53′37″S 072°52′55″W	
SCNR		Fundo Naicura Airport	Rengo	34°19′13″S 070°55′13″W	Closed
SCNS		Sandra Scabini Airport	Punta Arenas	52°23′38″S 069°45′25″W	Closed
SCNT	PNT	Teniente Julio Gallardo Airport	Puerto Natales	51°40′12″S 072°31′50″W	
SCNU		Marimenuco Airfield	Lonquimay	38°44′21″S 071°12′06″W	Closed
SCNV		Nueva Victoria Airport	Pozo Almonte	20°44′06″S 069°37′33″W	Closed
SCNY		Yendegaia Airport	Tierra del Fuego	54°49′50″S 068°50′07″W	
SCOA		Estancia Los Loros Airport	Ovalle	30°47′45″S 071°37′14″W	
SCOB		Tabalí Bajo Airport	Ovalle	30°38′36″S 071°24′07″W	
SCOC		Las Araucarias Airport	Puerto Octay	40°59′35″S 072°39′39″W	
SCOE		Romeral San Miguel Airport	Romeral	34°57′43″S 071°01′05″W	
SCOH		Río Mayer Airport	Villa O'Higgins	48°28′06″S 072°33′51″W	
SCOI		Los Coipos Airport	Hualañé	34°54′46″S 071°39′39″W	
SCOL		Refugio del Lago Airport	Termas de Puyehue	40°41′22″S 072°20′45″W	
SCOM		Olmué Aerodrome	Olmué	32°59′50″S 071°10′20″W	
SCON		Quellón Airport	Quellón	43°08′05″S 073°38′00″W	
SCOO		Melimoyu Aerodrome	Cisnes	44°05′51″S 073°05′49″W	
SCOP		Pilauco Airport	Osorno	40°33′15″S 073°07′49″W	
SCOR		Algorta Airport	Sierra Gorda	23°07′06″S 069°52′40″W	
SCOS		Pampa Alegre Aerodrome	Osorno	40°32′52″S 073°10′00″W	
SCOT		Santa Rosa de Tabalí Airport	Santa Rosa de Tabalí	30°40′35″S 071°24′03″W	
SCOV	OVL	El Tuqui Airport	Ovalle	30°33′35″S 071°10′35″W	
SCOY		Huayanay Airport	Ovalle	30°26′00″S 071°32′05″W	
SCPA		Cerro Paranal Airport	Cerro Paranal	24°38′20″S 070°20′55″W	
SCPB		Puelo Bajo Airport	Puelo Bajo	41°39′30″S 072°18′00″W	
SCPC	ZPC	Pucón Airport	Pucón	39°17′29″S 071°55′15″W	
SCPD		Pedro de Valdivia Airport	María Elena	22°34′25″S 069°40′05″W	
SCPE		San Pedro de Atacama Airport	San Pedro de Atacama	22°55′18″S 068°09′30″W	
SCPF		Marcel Marchant Airport	Puerto Montt	41°27′15″S 072°55′03″W	
SCPG		Municipal de Panguipulli Airport	Panguipulli	39°39′20″S 072°21′32″W	
SCPH		Puyuhuapi Airport	Puyuhuapi	44°23′00″S 072°35′37″W	
SCPI		Pullamí Airport	Coihueco	36°35′15″S 071°48′30″W	
SCPK		Puerto Cisnes Airport	Puerto Cisnes	44°45′30″S 072°41′55″W	
SCPL		Calpulli Airport	Paillaco	40°07′40″S 072°39′42″W	
SCPM		Pichilemu Aerodrome	Pichilemu	34°23′40″S 072°01′06″W	
SCPN		Pillán Airport	Chaitén	42°32′50″S 072°29′42″W	
SCPO		Isla Picton Airport	Quinta de Tilcoco	34°19′40″S 070°57′50″W	
SCPP		Poco a Poco Airport	Mulchén	37°50′51″S 072°00′35″W	Closed
SCPQ	MHC	Mocopulli Airport	Dalcahue	42°20′25″S 073°42′56″W	
SCPR		Corte Alto Airport	Purranque	40°56′30″S 073°10′07″W	
SCPS		Pisagua Airport	Pisagua	19°36′05″S 070°11′52″W	
SCPT		La Puerta Airport	Santa Cruz	34°36′47″S 071°22′33″W	
SCPU		Peulla Airport	Peulla	41°03′26″S 072°00′50″W	
SCPV	PUX	El Mirador Airport	Puerto Varas	41°20′55″S 072°56′50″W	
SCPW		Peumo Airport	Peumo	34°24′32″S 071°10′00″W	
SCPX		Punta Catalina Airport	Punta Catalina	52°32′58″S 068°45′25″W	
SCPY		Cerro Castillo Airport	Cerro Castillo	51°15′37″S 072°20′10″W	
SCQC		La Colmena Airport	Traiguén	38°20′05″S 072°35′15″W	
SCQE		Quenac Airport	Isla Quenac	42°27′55″S 073°20′04″W	
SCQI		Icalma Airport	Icalma Lake	38°44′00″S 071°13′05″W	
SCQK		Lequecahue Airport	Tirúa	38°21′40″S 073°29′23″W	
SCQL		El Boco Airport	Quillota	32°51′05″S 071°14′40″W	
SCQM		Las Quemas Airport	Osorno	40°38′16″S 073°07′40″W	
SCQO		Quitralco Airport	Aysén	45°34′50″S 073°13′32″W	
SCQP	ZCO	La Araucanía International Airport	Temuco	38°55′30″S 072°39′05″W	
SCQR		Los Morros Airport	Cobquecura	36°07′20″S 072°48′18″W	
SCQT		Las Tacas Airport	Las Tacas	30°05′50″S 071°21′50″W	
SCQU		Inio Airport	Quellón	43°21′06″S 074°06′57″W	
SCQW		Quemchi Airport	Quemchi	42°09′15″S 073°31′12″W	
SCQX		Queilén Airport	Queilén	42°53′35″S 073°28′25″W	
SCQY		Villa Portales Airport	Lonquimay	38°26′55″S 071°21′25″W	
SCRA	CNR	Chañaral Airport	Chañaral	26°19′55″S 070°36′25″W	
SCRB		Río Bravo Airport	Caleta Tortel	47°59′25″S 073°08′33″W	
SCRC		Villa Tapera Airport	Lago Verde	44°38′25″S 071°39′55″W	
SCRD		Rodelillo Airfield	Viña del Mar	33°04′06″S 071°33′27″W	
SCRE		Estancia Río Cisnes Airport	Lago Verde	44°30′00″S 071°18′52″W	
SCRF		Laguna San Raphael Airport	Laguna San Raphael	46°38′25″S 073°51′45″W	
SCRG	QRC	Rancagua de la Independencia Airport	Rancagua	34°10′25″S 070°46′35″W	
SCRH		Reñihúe Airport	Chaitén	42°35′10″S 072°29′44″W	
SCRI		Rio Frio Airport	Río Frio	41°44′33″S 071°54′35″W	
SCRL		Rapel La Estrella Airport	Rapel	34°11′55″S 071°28′52″W	
SCRM	TNM	Teniente Rodolfo Marsh Martin Airport	Base Presidente Eduardo Frei Montalva and Villa Las Estrellas	62°11′28″S 058°59′10″W	
SCRN		Río Negro Airport	Hornopirén	41°57′40″S 072°27′10″W	
SCRO		Santa Bárbara Airport	Romeral	34°57′32″S 071°01′55″W	
SCRP		Rapelhuapi Airport	Rapel	34°06′23″S 071°30′45″W	
SCRQ		Rucananco Airport	Río Bueno	40°31′20″S 072°46′25″W	
SCRR		Purrahuín Airport	Río Bueno	40°21′55″S 072°46′36″W	
SCRS		El Rosario Aerodrome	Cartagena	33°29′20″S 071°24′20″W	
SCRT		El Almendro Airport	Retiro	35°57′35″S 071°47′33″W	
SCRU		Puerto Murta Airport	Puerto Murta	46°27′20″S 072°40′35″W	
SCRV		La Verónica Airport	Vilcún	38°36′41″S 072°07′44″W	Closed
SCRW		Rucalonco Airport	Paredones	34°33′10″S 072°02′50″W	
SCRX		Pintacura Airport	Illapel	31°40′56″S 071°15′56″W	Closed
SCRY		El Arrayán Airport	Puerto Varas	41°24′10″S 072°56′36″W	Closed
SCRZ		El Carrizal Airport	Marchigüe	34°26′36″S 071°42′22″W	Closed
SCSA		Alberto Santos Dumont Airport	Tiltil	33°01′45″S 070°52′48″W	
SCSB	SMB	Franco Bianco Airport	Cerro Sombrero	52°44′12″S 069°20′05″W	
SCSD		San Fernando Airport	San Fernando	34°33′55″S 070°58′05″W	
SCSE	LSC	La Florida Airport	La Serena	29°54′58″S 071°11′58″W	
SCSF		Víctor Lafón Airport	San Felipe	32°44′45″S 070°42′18″W	
SCSG		San Gerónimo Aerodrome	Algarrobo	33°21′12″S 071°37′35″W	
SCSH		El Budi Airport	Teodoro Schmidt	39°03′48″S 073°10′10″W	
SCSJ		San Javier Airport	San Javier	35°37′35″S 071°42′00″W	
SCSK		Colorado Airport	San Clemente	35°39′45″S 071°18′13″W	
SCSL		Salar de Atacama Airport	Salar de Atacama	23°38′56″S 068°18′20″W	
SCSM		Minsal Airport	Salar de Atacama	23°35′03″S 068°23′00″W	
SCSN		Santo Domingo Airfield	Valparaíso	33°39′23″S 071°36′55″W	
SCSO		Costa del Sol Airport	Rapel	34°07′15″S 071°31′40″W	
SCSP		El Sobrante Airport	Petorca	32°13′25″S 070°48′00″W	
SCSQ		Quilpe Airport	San Pablo	40°20′25″S 073°19′15″W	
SCSR		Segundo Corral Alto Airfield	Segundo Corral	42°04′27″S 071°51′50″W	
SCSS		San Sebastián Airport	San Sebastián	53°18′58″S 068°39′25″W	
SCST	WCA	Gamboa Airport	Castro	42°29′18″S 073°46′30″W	
SCSU		Santa Lucía Airport	Freire	38°55′09″S 072°22′00″W	
SCSV		Viñasutil Airport	Peralillo	34°26′55″S 071°23′10″W	
SCSZ		Puerto Sánchez Airport	Puerto Sánchez	46°35′30″S 072°35′13″W	
SCTA		Santa Luisa Airport	Santa Bárbara	37°44′38″S 071°42′36″W	
SCTB		Eulogio Sánchez Airport	La Reina, Santiago	33°27′23″S 070°32′48″W	
SCTC	PZS	Temuco Maquehue Airport	Temuco	38°46′00″S 072°38′10″W	
SCTE	PMC	El Tepual International Airport	Puerto Montt	41°26′19″S 073°05′38″W	
SCTG		Tongoy Airport	Tongoy	30°15′59″S 071°29′02″W	Closed
SCTH		Tres Chorrillos Airport	San Gregorio	52°31′31″S 070°43′26″W	
SCTI	ULC	Los Cerrillos Airport	Santiago	33°29′37″S 070°41′52″W	Closed
SCTL	TLX	Panguilemo Airport	Talca	35°22′40″S 071°36′05″W	
SCTM		Curicó La Montaña Airport	Curicó	34°58′08″S 070°56′00″W	
SCTN	WCH	Nuevo Chaitén Airport	Chaitén	42°46′55″S 072°50′05″W	
SCTO	ZIC	Victoria Airport	Victoria	38°14′45″S 072°20′55″W	
SCTP		Río Pascua Airport	Tortel	48°13′43″S 073°18′00″W	
SCTQ		Tres Quebradas Airport	Alto del Carmen	29°15′34″S 070°05′15″W	
SCTR		Traiguén Airport	Traiguén	38°16′15″S 072°39′42″W	
SCTS		Santa Teresa del Almendral Airport	Melipilla	33°34′28″S 071°15′45″W	
SCTT	TTC	Las Breas Airport	Taltal	25°33′50″S 070°22′33″W	
SCTU		Litueche Airport	Litueche	34°06′45″S 071°43′07″W	
SCTW		El Tapihue Airport	Casablanca	33°19′13″S 071°19′55″W	
SCUA		Guanaco Airport	Taltal	25°05′48″S 069°30′36″W	
SCUE		La Peña Airport	Pencahue	35°15′59″S 071°45′47″W	
SCUH		Fundo Cuincahuin Aerodrome	Río Bueno	40°24′48″S 072°45′35″W	
SCUI		Chaitén Pumalín Airport	Chaitén	42°42′05″S 072°50′02″W	
SCUL		Bulnes El Litral Airport	Bulnes	36°47′40″S 072°25′04″W	
SCUM		Cumpeo La Obra Airport	Cumpeo	35°18′00″S 071°19′48″W	
SCUN		Bellavista de Punitaqui Airport	Punitaqui	31°00′31″S 071°21′06″W	
SCUP		Lontuecito Airport	Río Claro	35°17′00″S 071°14′12″W	
SCUR		Bulnes Rucamelen Airport	Bulnes	36°48′35″S 072°10′00″W	Closed
SCUT		Verfrut Sur Airport	Longaví	36°12′45″S 071°32′40″W	Closed
SCUU		El Peral Airport	Illapel	31°39′12″S 071°14′36″W	
SCUZ		Santa Cruz Airport	Santa Cruz	34°38′53″S 071°23′15″W	
SCVA	VAP	Viñamar Airport	Casablanca	33°21′25″S 071°21′15″W	
SCVB		Hospital Villa Baviera Airport	Villa Baviera	36°23′55″S 071°33′50″W	
SCVC		Vicuña Airport	Vicuña	29°50′04″S 070°02′46″W	
SCVD	ZAL	Pichoy Airport	Valdivia	39°38′59″S 073°05′10″W	
SCVE		Lago Verde Airport	Lago Verde	44°13′45″S 071°51′05″W	
SCVF		San Pedro Verfrut Airport	San Pedro	34°00′25″S 071°23′32″W	
SCVG		El Vergel Airport	Riñihue	39°49′47″S 072°29′10″W	
SCVH		La Victoria de Chacabuco Airport	Santiago	33°03′00″S 070°42′30″W	
SCVI		Villarrica Airport	Villarrica	39°19′02″S 072°13′42″W	
SCVJ		Paredes Viejas Airport	Marchigüe	34°23′50″S 071°32′35″W	
SCVK		Vichuquén El Alamo Airport	Vichuquén	34°50′46″S 072°01′12″W	
SCVL		Las Marías Airport	Valdivia	39°47′50″S 073°14′30″W	
SCVM	KNA	Viña del Mar Airport	Viña del Mar	32°57′00″S 071°28′45″W	
SCVN		Vicuña Huancara Airport	Vicuña	30°01′57″S 070°44′30″W	
SCVO		Victoria María Ester Airport	Victoria	38°13′48″S 072°28′49″W	
SCVQ		Vichuquén Cuatro Pantanos Airport	Vichuquén	34°50′14″S 072°03′54″W	
SCVS		Lago Vargas Airport	Cochrane	47°40′45″S 073°04′15″W	
SCVT		Viña Tarapacá Airport	Isla de Maipo	33°46′01″S 070°55′20″W	
SCVU		Vilcún Agromanzun Airport	Vilcún	38°41′46″S 072°20′26″W	
SCVV		Los Maitenes de Villa Vieja Airport	La Unión	40°19′05″S 072°58′47″W	
SCVY		Vilcún La Malla Airport	Vilcún	38°41′26″S 072°17′13″W	
SCXA		Alupenhue Airport	Molina	35°14′20″S 071°04′15″W	
SCXB		Las Brujas Airport	Salamanca	31°47′10″S 071°00′45″W	
SCXR		Las Bandurrias Airport	Lago Ranco	40°19′15″S 072°13′30″W	
SCYB		Yumbel Trilahue Airport	Yumbel	37°07′59″S 072°24′50″W	
SCYC		La Capilla Airport	Puyehue	40°37′35″S 072°46′00″W	
SCYL		Licán Airport	Puyehue	40°38′10″S 072°24′47″W	
SCYO		Poyo Airport	Chaitén	42°13′34″S 072°41′41″W	
SCYR		Los Maitenes Airport	Retiro	36°01′50″S 071°44′25″W	
SCYU		Cuyumaique Airport	Purranque	40°56′26″S 073°00′42″W	
SCZA		La Empastada Airport	Zapallar	32°35′29″S 071°22′41″W	
SCZB		Pozo Brujo Airport	La Unión	40°12′19″S 072°34′05″W	
SCZC		Zapallar Casas Viejas Airport	Zapallar	32°35′43″S 071°20′50″W	
SCZE		Pirque Estero Seco Airport	Pirque	33°44′45″S 070°32′57″W	
SCZR		Los Zorrillos de Tonlemu Airport	Curepto	35°05′45″S 071°43′58″W	
