= Las Tacas Airport =

- IATA: none; ICAO: SCQT

Summary
- Airport type: Public
- Serves: Las Tacas (es), Chile
- Elevation AMSL: 140 ft / 43 m
- Coordinates: 30°5′50″S 71°21′50″W

Map
- Location of Las Tacas Airport in Chile

Runways
| Direction | Length | | Surface |
| Direction | m | ft | Surface |
|---|---|---|---|
| 17/35 | 900 | 2,953 | Asphalt |

Helipads
| Number | Length | | Surface |
| Number | m | ft | Surface |
|---|---|---|---|
| 1 | 13 | 43 | Asphalt |
- Source: Landings.com Google Maps GCM

Las Tacas Airport Spanish: Aeropuerto de Las Tacas, (ICAO: SCQT) is an airport serving Las Tacas (es), a Pacific coastal resort in the Coquimbo Region of Chile. The airport is 24 kilometres (15 mi) south of La Serena.

Runway length does not include a 195 metres (640 ft) displaced threshold on Runway 35. There is high terrain north of the airport.

The Tongoy VOR-DME (TOY) is located 12.2 nautical miles (22.6 km) south-southwest of the airport.

== See also ==
- Transport in Chile
- List of airports in Chile
