= Lago Vargas Airport =

- IATA: none; ICAO: SCVS

Summary
- Airport type: Public
- Serves: Cochrane, Chile
- Elevation AMSL: 56 ft / 17 m
- Coordinates: 47°40′45″S 73°04′15″W

Map
- Location of Lago Vargas Airport in Chile

Runways
Direction	Length		Surface
Direction	m	ft	Surface
18/36	655	2,149	Grass
- Source: Landings.com Bing Maps GCM

Lago Vargas Airport Spanish: Aeropuerto Lago Vargas, (ICAO: SCVS) is a rural airstrip in the Aysén Region of Chile. A service road connects it to the Carretera Austral. The nearest town is Cochrane, 60 kilometres (37 mi) to the northeast.

The runway is in a river basin 1.6 kilometres (1 mi) east of the Baker River. It is in mountainous terrain.

== See also ==
- Transport in Chile
- List of airports in Chile
