= Río Frío Airport =

Airport in Chile

- IATA: none; ICAO: SCRI

Summary
- Airport type: Public
- Serves: Río Frío, Chile
- Elevation AMSL: 1,000 ft / 305 m
- Coordinates: 41°44′33″S 71°54′35″W

Map
- Location of Río Frío Airport in Chile

Runways
Direction	Length		Surface
Direction	m	ft	Surface
12/30	560	1,837	Grass
- Source: GCM Google Maps

Río Frío Airport (ICAO: SCRI) is an airport serving the settlement of Río Frío, in the Los Lagos Region of Chile. It is 10 kilometres (6.2 mi) west of the border with Argentina.

The runway is up a narrow valley of the Frío River, a small tributary of the Manso River (es). There is close mountainous terrain in all quadrants, and the valley sides limit maneuvering.

== See also ==
- Transport in Chile
- List of airports in Chile
