= Cochamó Airport =

Airport in Chile

- IATA: none; ICAO: SCKM

Summary
- Airport type: Public
- Serves: Cochamó, Chile
- Elevation AMSL: 130 ft / 40 m
- Coordinates: 41°28′55″S 72°18′27″W

Map
- Location of Cochamó Airport in Chile

Runways
Direction	Length		Surface
Direction	m	ft	Surface
17/35	600	1,969	Grass
- Source: Landings.com Google Maps GCM

Cochamó Airport Spanish: Aeropuerto de Cochamó, (ICAO: SCKM) is a public use airport serving Cochamó, a town in the Los Lagos Region of Chile. Cochamó is at the northern end of the Reloncaví Estuary.

The airport is just north of the town, on a bluff alongside the estuary. South approach and departures are over the water. The region is mountainous, and there is rising terrain to the east of the runway.

The Puerto Montt VOR-DME (Ident: MON) is 35.8 nautical miles (66.3 km) to the west of the airport.

== See also ==
- Transport in Chile
- List of airports in Chile
