= Los Calafates Airport =

- IATA: none; ICAO: SCFS

Summary
- Airport type: Private
- Serves: Chonchi, Chile
- Location: Huillinco
- Elevation AMSL: 82 ft / 25 m
- Coordinates: 42°40′42″S 73°53′45″W

Map
- Location of Los Calafates Airport in Chile

Runways
| Direction | Length | | Surface |
| Direction | m | ft | Surface |
|---|---|---|---|
| 07/25 | 563 | 1,847 | Grass |
- Source: Landings.com Google Maps GCM

Los Calafates Airport Spanish: Aeropuerto de Los Calafates, (ICAO: SCFS) is an airport serving Chonchi, a coastal town on Chiloé Island in the Los Lagos Region of Chile. The airport is 12 kilometres (7.5 mi) southwest of Chonchi, at the eastern end of Huillinco Lake.

== See also ==
- Transport in Chile
- List of airports in Chile
