= Los Lirios Airport =

- IATA: none; ICAO: SCKI

Summary
- Airport type: Private
- Serves: Curicó, Chile
- Elevation AMSL: 820 ft (250 m)
- Coordinates: 34°54′25″S 71°12′10″W

Map
- Location of Los Lirios Airport in Chile

Runways
Direction	Length		Surface
Direction	m	ft	Surface
03/21	600	1,969	Grass
- Source: Landings.com Google Maps GCM

Los Lirios Airport Spanish: Aeropuerto Los Lirios, (ICAO: SCKI) is a rural airport 8 kilometres (5 mi) north of Curicó, a city in the Maule Region of Chile. The airport is 1.6 kilometres (1 mi) from the Teno River.

The runway has 130 metres (430 ft) of unpaved overrun on the north end.

The Curico VOR-DME (Ident: ICO) is 3.9 nautical miles (7.2 km) south of the airport.

== See also ==
- Transport in Chile
- List of airports in Chile
