= Melipilla Airport =

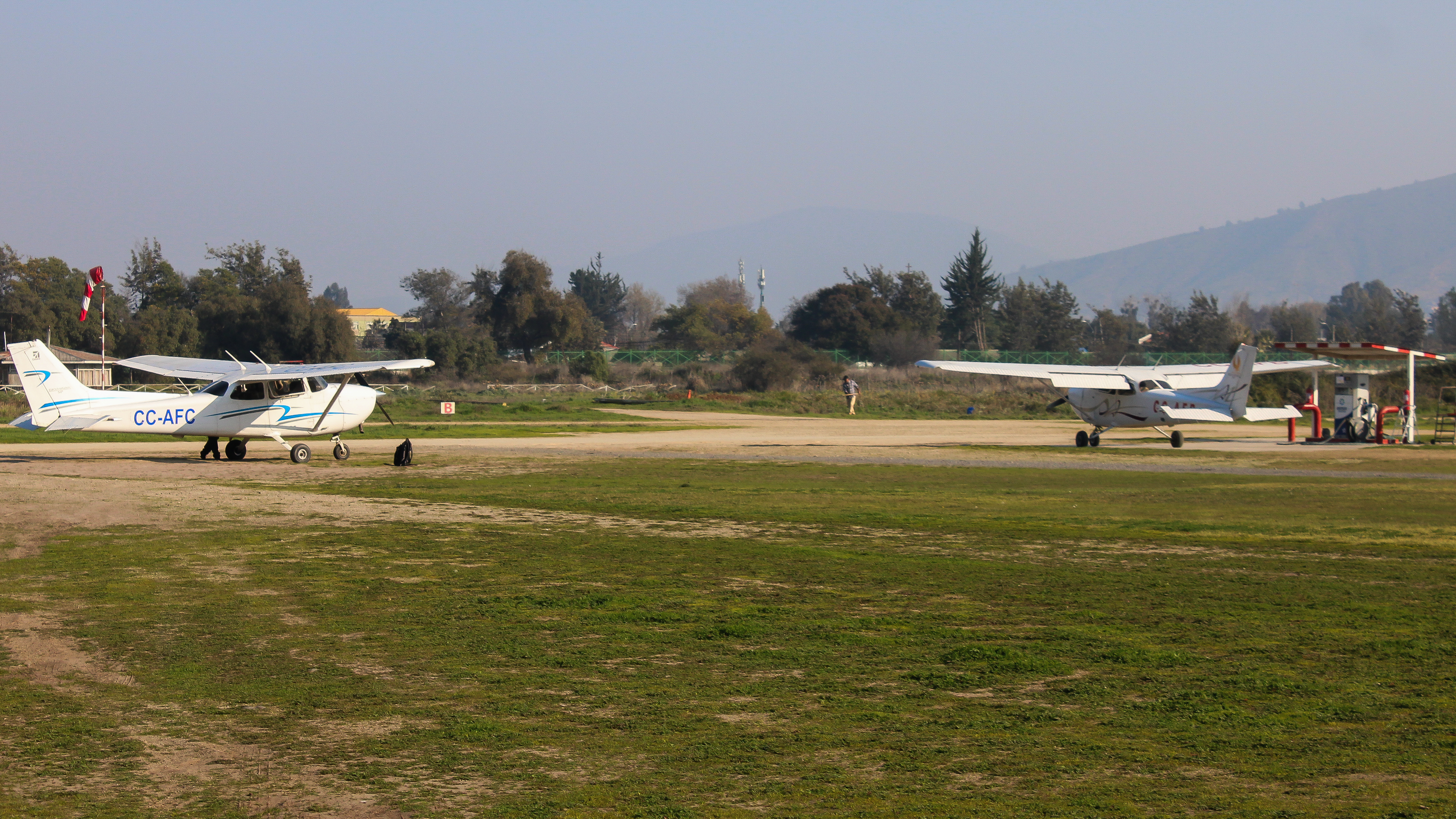
- IATA: none; ICAO: SCMP

Summary
- Airport type: Public
- Serves: Melipilla, Chile
- Elevation AMSL: 574 ft / 175 m
- Coordinates: 33°40′35″S 71°11′35″W

Map
- Location of Melipilla Airport in Chile

Runways
Direction	Length		Surface
Direction	m	ft	Surface
08/26	535	1,755	Dirt
- Source: Landings.com Google Maps GCM

Melipilla Airport (Spanish: Aeropuerto de Melipilla), (ICAO: SCMP) is a small general aviation airport adjacent to the east side of Melipilla, a city in the Santiago Metropolitan Region of Chile.

There are nearby hills to the north of the airport and, along with the city, it sits in the Maipo Valley. The runway has an additional 200 metres (660 ft) of unpaved overrun on the west end.

The Melipilla non-directional beacon (Ident: PIL) is located 1.5 nautical miles (2.8 km) west of the runway.

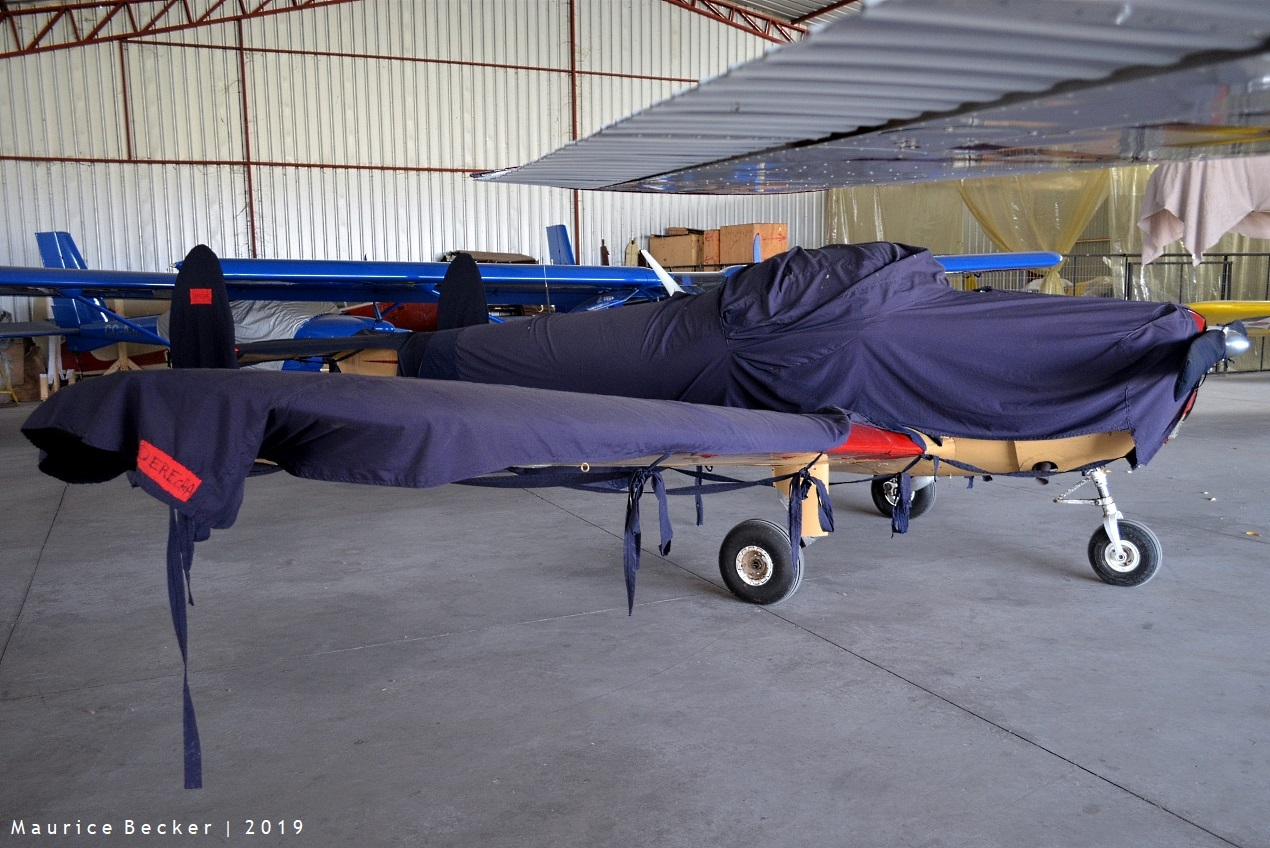
It has different types of aircraft, like this interesting Erco Ercoupe 415C.

== See also ==
- Transport in Chile
- List of airports in Chile
