= Chillán Fundo El Carmen Airport =

Airport serving Chillán, Chile

Fundo El Carmen Airport
- IATA: none; ICAO: SCFK

Summary
- Airport type: Private
- Serves: Chillán, Chile
- Elevation AMSL: 557 ft / 170 m
- Coordinates: 36°38′30″S 72°00′45″W

Map
- Location of Fundo El Carmen Airport in Chile

Runways
Direction	Length		Surface
Direction	m	ft	Surface
09/27	1,080	3,543	Grass
- Source: Landings.com Google Maps GCM

Fundo El Carmen Airport Spanish: Aeropuerto de Fundo El Carmen, (ICAO: SCFK)) is an airport 7 kilometres (4.3 mi) east of Chillán, a city in the Bío Bío Region of Chile. The runway lies alongside the south bank of the Chillán River.

The Chillan VOR-DME (Ident: CHI) is located 3.6 nautical miles (6.7 km) north of the airport.

== See also ==
- Transport in Chile
- List of airports in Chile
