= Curacaví Airport =

Airport in Santiago Metropolitan Region, Chile

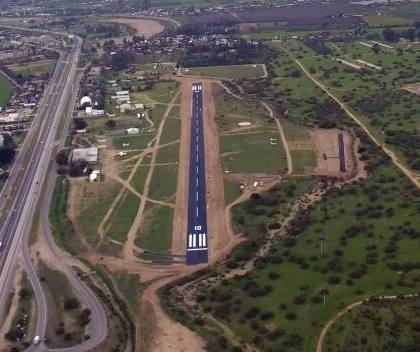
- IATA: none; ICAO: SCCV

Summary
- Airport type: Public
- Serves: Curacaví, Chile
- Elevation AMSL: 666 ft / 203 m
- Coordinates: 33°24′45″S 71°09′55″W

Map
- Location of Curacaví Airport in Chile

Runways
Direction	Length		Surface
Direction	m	ft	Surface
11/29	800	2,625	Asphalt
- Source: Landings.com Google Maps GCM IFIS Chile

Curacaví Airport Spanish: Aeropuerto de Curacaví, (ICAO: SCCV) is an airport serving Curacaví, a city in the Santiago Metropolitan Region of Chile.

The airport is in a mountain valley, 3 kilometres (1.9 mi) west of Curacaví, and runs alongside the Santiago - Valparaíso highway. There is mountainous terrain in all quadrants.

The Santiago VOR-DME (Ident: AMB) is 19.1 nautical miles (35.4 km) east of the airport.

== See also ==
- Transport in Chile
- List of airports in Chile
