= Tolquién Airport =

- IATA: none; ICAO: SCAH

Summary
- Airport type: Public
- Serves: Achao, Chile
- Elevation AMSL: 551 ft / 168 m
- Coordinates: 42°27′00″S 73°31′30″W

Map
- Location of Tolquién Airport in Chile

Runways
Direction	Length		Surface
Direction	m	ft	Surface
17/35	730	2,395	Paved
- Source: Landings.com Google Maps GCM

Tolquién Airport (Spanish: Aeródromo de Tolquién, (ICAO: SCAH)) is an airport serving Achao, a coastal town on Quinchao Island in the Los Lagos Region of Chile. The airport is on a bluff overlooking the Gulf of Ancud, 3.2 kilometres (2 mi) northwest of Achao.

== See also ==
- Transport in Chile
- List of airports in Chile
