= Loncopan Airport =

- IATA: none; ICAO: SCFU

Summary
- Airport type: Private
- Serves: Futrono, Chile
- Location: Nontuela
- Elevation AMSL: 886 ft (270 m)
- Coordinates: 40°03′55″S 72°32′25″W

Map
- Location of Loncopan Airport in Chile

Runways
Direction	Length		Surface
Direction	m	ft	Surface
13/31	955	3,133	Gravel
- Source: GCM Google Maps

Loncopan Airport Spanish: Aeropuerto Loncopan, (ICAO: SCFU) is an airstrip 15 kilometres (9.3 mi) west-northwest of Futrono, a lakeside town on Ranco Lake in the Los Ríos Region of Chile. The runway parallels the highway just south of the village of Nontuela.

== See also ==
- Transport in Chile
- List of airports in Chile
