= Quellón Airport =

- IATA: none; ICAO: SCON

Summary
- Airport type: Public
- Serves: Quellón, Chile
- Elevation AMSL: 39 ft / 12 m
- Coordinates: 43°08′05″S 73°38′00″W

Map
- Location of Quellón Airport in Chile

Runways
| Direction | Length | | Surface |
| Direction | m | ft | Surface |
|---|---|---|---|
| 04/22 | 1,200 | 3,937 | Asphalt |
- Source: Landings.com Google Maps GCM

Quellón Airport (Spanish: Aeropuerto de Quellón), (ICAO: SCON) is an airport serving Quellón, a city in the Los Lagos Region of Chile. Quellón is on Chiloé Island, on a sheltered harbor off the Gulf of Corcovado.

The runway spans a peninsula 1.6 kilometres (1 mi) across the harbor from Quellón. Approach and departure from either end are over the water.

== See also ==
- Transport in Chile
- List of airports in Chile
