= Río Pascua Airport =

Airport in Chile

- IATA: none; ICAO: SCTP

Summary
- Airport type: Public
- Serves: Caleta Tortel, Chile
- Elevation AMSL: 197 ft / 60 m
- Coordinates: 48°13′43″S 73°18′00″W

Map
- Location of Río Pascua Airport in Chile

Runways
Direction	Length		Surface
Direction	m	ft	Surface
12/30	700	2,297	Grass
- Source: Landings.com GCM

Río Pascua Airport (Spanish: Aeropuerto Río Pascua), (ICAO: SCTP) is an airport serving small settlements along the Pascua River in the Aysén Region of Chile. The runway is 51 kilometres (32 mi) south-southwest of Caleta Tortel, a coastal village.

There is mountainous terrain in all quadrants. The runway is aligned northwest with the lowest terrain routing.

== See also ==
- Transport in Chile
- List of airports in Chile
