= Licán Airport =

- IATA: none; ICAO: SCYL

Summary
- Airport type: Public
- Serves: Puyehue
- Elevation AMSL: 625 ft / 191 m
- Coordinates: 40°38′10″S 72°24′47″W

Map
- Location of Licán Airport in Chile

Runways
| Direction | Length | | Surface |
| Direction | m | ft | Surface |
|---|---|---|---|
| 18/36 | 610 | 2,001 | Grass |
- Source: Landings.com Google Maps GCM

Licán Airport (Spanish: Aeropuerto de Licán, (ICAO: SCYL)) is an airstrip 17 kilometres (11 mi) east-northeast of Entre Lagos, a town in the Los Lagos Region of Chile. The airstrip is on the small delta of the Licán River on the north shore of Lake Puyehue.

== See also ==
- Transport in Chile
- List of airports in Chile
