= Papageno Airport =

Former airstrip in the Los Ríos Region of Chile

- IATA: none; ICAO: SCNG

Summary
- Airport type: Closed
- Serves: Panguipulli, Chile
- Elevation AMSL: 853 ft / 260 m
- Coordinates: 39°32′59″S 72°17′28″W

Map
- Location of Papageno Airport in Chile

Runways
Direction	Length		Surface
Direction	ft	m	Surface
Closed
- Source: Landings.com Google Maps

Papageno Airport (Spanish: Aeropuerto Papageno), (ICAO: SCNG) was an airstrip 1 kilometre (0.6 mi) west of Calafquén Lake. Panguipulli, a city in the Los Ríos Region of Chile, is 11 kilometres (6.8 mi) to the south.

== See also ==
- Transport in Chile
- List of airports in Chile
