= El Tapihue Airport =

Airstrip in Valparaíso Region, Chile

- IATA: none; ICAO: SCTW

Summary
- Airport type: Private
- Serves: Casablanca, Chile
- Elevation AMSL: 935 ft / 285 m
- Coordinates: 33°19′13″S 71°19′55″W

Map
- Location of El Tapihue Airport in Chile

Runways
Direction	Length		Surface
Direction	m	ft	Surface
03/21	500	1,640	Grass
- Source: Landings.com Google Maps GCM

El Tapihue Airport (Spanish: Aeropuerto El Tapihue, (ICAO: SCTW) is an airstrip 6 kilometres (3.7 mi) east of Casablanca, a city in the Valparaíso Region of Chile.

The Santo Domingo VOR-DME (Ident: SNO) is located 25.1 nautical miles (46.5 km) south-southwest of El Tapihue.

== See also ==
- Transport in Chile
- List of airports in Chile
