= San Gerónimo Aerodrome =

Airstrip in Valparaíso Region, Chile

San Gerónimo Airport
- IATA: none; ICAO: SCSG

Summary
- Airport type: Private
- Serves: Algarrobo, Chile
- Elevation AMSL: 341 ft / 104 m
- Coordinates: 33°21′12″S 71°37′35″W

Map
- Location of San Gerónimo Airport in Chile

Runways
| Direction | Length | | Surface |
| Direction | m | ft | Surface |
|---|---|---|---|
| 09/27 | 504 | 1,654 | Grass |
- Source: Landings.com Google Maps GCM

San Gerónimo Airport (Spanish: Aeródromo de San Gerónimo, (ICAO: SCSG)) is an airstrip serving Algarrobo, a Pacific coastal city in the Valparaíso Region of Chile. The airstrip is 4.6 kilometres (2.9 mi) inland from the coast.

The runway parallels an east–west road atop a low ridge. There are ravines to the north and south of the runway. Another road intersects the runway at a shallow angle, giving the runway the visual appearance of being bent.

The Santo Domingo VOR-DME (Ident: SNO) is located 18.8 nautical miles (34.8 km) south of San Gerónimo Airport

== See also ==
- Transport in Chile
- List of airports in Chile
