= Ayacara Airport =

- IATA: none; ICAO: SCAY

Summary
- Airport type: Public
- Serves: Ayacara (es), Chile
- Elevation AMSL: 80 ft / 24 m
- Coordinates: 42°18′27″S 72°47′15″W

Map
- Location of Ayacara Airport in Chile

Runways
| Direction | Length | | Surface |
| Direction | m | ft | Surface |
|---|---|---|---|
| 03/21 | 579 | 1,900 | Paved |
- Source: Landings.com Google Maps SkyVector

Ayacara Airport (Spanish: Aeropuerto de Ayacara, (ICAO: SCAY)) is an airport serving Ayacara (es), a coastal village in the Los Lagos Region of Chile.

The airport and village are on the Ayacara Peninsula, at the end of Ayacara Cove, an inlet off the Gulf of Ancud. South approach and departures follow along the shoreline.

The Chaiten VOR-DME (Ident: TEN) is located 28.9 nautical miles (53.5 km) south of the airport.

== See also ==
- Transport in Chile
- List of airports in Chile
