= La Playa Airport =

- IATA: none; ICAO: SCLY

Summary
- Airport type: Private
- Owner: Celulosa Arauco y Constitución, S.A.
- Serves: Laraquete
- Elevation AMSL: 32 ft (9.8 m)
- Coordinates: 37°13′00″S 73°14′00″W

Map
- Location of La Playa Airport in Chile

Runways
Direction	Length		Surface
Direction	m	ft	Surface
05/23	958	3,143	Grass
- Source: Landings.com Google Maps GCM

La Playa Airport Spanish: Aeropuerto de La Playa, (ICAO: SCLY) is an airport serving the Celulosa Arauco y Constitución wood products plant. The airport is 7 kilometres (4.3 mi) south of Laraquete, a Pacific coastal town in the Bío Bío Region of Chile.

== See also ==
- Transport in Chile
- List of airports in Chile
