= Juan Kemp Airport =

- IATA: none; ICAO: SCJK

Summary
- Airport type: Private
- Location: Rupanco Lake, Chile
- Elevation AMSL: 459 ft / 140 m
- Coordinates: 40°53′23″S 72°22′20″W

Map
- Location of Juan Kemp Airport in Chile

Runways
Direction	Length		Surface
Direction	m	ft	Surface
06/24	508	1,667	Grass
- Source: Landings.com Google Maps GCM

Juan Kemp Airport (Spanish: Aeropuerto Juan Kemp), (ICAO: SCJK) is an airstrip on the southern shore of Rupanco Lake in the Los Lagos Region of Chile. The nearest town is Entre Lagos, 30 kilometres (19 mi) northwest on neighboring Puyehue Lake.

There is nearby mountainous terrain south of the runway. Terrain is a consideration for southwest approach and departure.

== See also ==
- Transport in Chile
- List of airports in Chile
