= Peumo Airport =

- IATA: none; ICAO: SCPW

Summary
- Airport type: Public
- Serves: Peumo, Chile
- Elevation AMSL: 557 ft / 170 m
- Coordinates: 34°24′32″S 71°10′00″W

Map
- Location of Peumo Airport in Chile

Runways
Direction	Length		Surface
Direction	m	ft	Surface
10/28	783	2,569	Grass
- Source: Landings.com Google Maps GCM

Peumo Airport (Spanish: Aeropuerto de Peumo), (ICAO: SCPW) is an airport 2 kilometres (1.2 mi) south of Peumo, a town in the O'Higgins Region of Chile.

The airport is within a bend of the Cachapoal River. There is nearby high terrain north through east of the runway.

== See also ==
- Transport in Chile
- List of airports in Chile
