= Punta Galera Airport =

Airport in Los Ríos Region, Chile

- IATA: none; ICAO: SCGA

Summary
- Airport type: Public
- Serves: La Unión
- Elevation AMSL: 118 ft / 36 m
- Coordinates: 40°00′10″S 73°41′50″W

Map
- Location of Punta Galera Airport in Chile

Runways
Direction	Length		Surface
Direction	m	ft	Surface
18/36	930	3,051	Grass
- Source: Landings.com Google Maps GCM

Punta Galera Airport Spanish: Aeropuerto Punta Galera, (ICAO: SCGA) is an airstrip located 62 kilometres (39 mi) west-northwest of La Unión, a city in the Los Ríos Region of Chile.

The airstrip is on an isolated point on the Pacific coast. Limited overruns on either end are grass with a downslope to a dropoff into the ocean. Approach and departures are over the water.

== See also ==
- Transport in Chile
- List of airports in Chile
