= Pilauco Airport =

- IATA: none; ICAO: SCOP

Summary
- Airport type: Public
- Serves: Osorno, Chile
- Elevation AMSL: 213 ft / 65 m
- Coordinates: 40°33′15″S 73°7′49″W

Map
- Location of Pilauco Airport in Chile

Runways
Direction	Length		Surface
Direction	m	ft	Surface
18/36	575	1,886	Grass
- Source: Landings.com Google Maps GCM

Pilauco Airport (Spanish: Aeropuerto de Pilauco), (ICAO: SCOP) is an airport 1.6 kilometres (1 mi) north of Osorno, a city in the Los Lagos Region of Chile.

The Osorno VOR-DME (Ident: OSO) is located 4.4 nautical miles (8.1 km) southeast of the airport. The Osorno non-directional beacon (Ident: OSO) is located 5.3 nautical miles (9.8 km) southeast of the airport.

== See also ==
- Transport in Chile
- List of airports in Chile
