= Santa María de Mingre Airport =

- IATA: none; ICAO: SCMG

Summary
- Airport type: Private
- Serves: San Javier, Chile
- Elevation AMSL: 574 ft / 175 m
- Coordinates: 35°34′15″S 72°00′15″W

Map
- Location of Santa María de Mingre Airport in Chile

Runways
| Direction | Length | | Surface |
| Direction | m | ft | Surface |
|---|---|---|---|
| 01/19 | 810 | 2,657 | Grass |
- Sources: GCM Google Maps

Santa María de Mingre Airport (ICAO: SCMG) is an airport in the western Maule Region of Chile. The airport is 24 kilometres (15 mi) west of San Javier.

The runway length does not include an additional 180 metres (590 ft) of unpaved overrun on each end of the runway. There is distant rising terrain in all quadrants.

== See also ==
- Transport in Chile
- List of airports in Chile
