= Fundo Loma Larga Airport =

Airstrip in Valparaíso Region, Chile

- IATA: none; ICAO: SCFL

Summary
- Airport type: Private
- Serves: Casablanca, Chile
- Elevation AMSL: 883 ft / 269 m
- Coordinates: 33°16′45″S 71°22′40″W

Map
- Location of Fundo Loma Larga Airport in Chile

Runways
Direction	Length		Surface
Direction	m	ft	Surface
03/21	908	2,979	Grass
- Source: Landings.com Google Maps GCM

Fundo Loma Larga Airport Spanish: Aeropuerto Fundo Loma Larga, (ICAO: SCFL) is an airport serving the Loma Larga winery 5 kilometres (3.1 mi) north of Casablanca, a city in the Valparaíso Region of Chile.

The Santo Domingo VOR-DME (Ident: SNO) is located 26.1 nautical miles (48.3 km) south-southwest of the airport.

== See also ==
- Transport in Chile
- List of airports in Chile
