= San Sebastián Airport (Chile) =

- IATA: none; ICAO: SCSS

Summary
- Airport type: Public
- Serves: San Sebastián
- Elevation AMSL: 50 ft / 15 m
- Coordinates: 53°18′58″S 68°39′25″W

Map
- Location of San Sebastián Airport in Chile

Runways
Direction	Length		Surface
Direction	m	ft	Surface
07/25	1,010	3,314	Gravel
- Source: Landings.com Google Maps GCM

San Sebastián Airport (ICAO: SCSS) is an airport in the north of Tierra del Fuego in the Magallanes y Antártica Chilena Region of Chile. It is 3 kilometres (1.9 mi) west of the border with Argentina, and serves the San Sebastián border crossing station.

Tierra del Fuego is the large island at the southern tip of South America, separated from the continent by the Strait of Magellan. The runway is 12 kilometres (7.5 mi) inland from San Sebastián Bay on the Argentinian side of the island.

== See also ==
- Transport in Chile
- List of airports in Chile
