= La Capilla Airport =

- IATA: none; ICAO: SCYC

Summary
- Airport type: Public
- Serves: Entre Lagos, Chile
- Elevation AMSL: 485 ft / 148 m
- Coordinates: 40°37′35″S 72°46′00″W

Map
- Location of La Capilla Airport in Chile

Runways
Direction	Length		Surface
Direction	m	ft	Surface
18/36	790	2,592	Grass
- Source: Landings.com Google Maps GCM

La Capilla Airport (Spanish: Aeropuerto La Capilla), (ICAO: SCYC) is an airstrip 15 kilometres (9.3 mi) west-northwest of Entre Lagos, a town in the Los Lagos Region of Chile.

The Osorno VOR-DME (Ident: OSO) is located 13.1 nautical miles (24.3 km) west of the airstrip. There are trees at both ends of the runway.

== See also ==
- Transport in Chile
- List of airports in Chile
