= Cuatro Diablos Airport =

Los Cuatro Diablos Airport
- IATA: none; ICAO: SCME

Summary
- Airport type: Public
- Serves: Melipilla, Chile
- Elevation AMSL: 660 ft / 201 m
- Coordinates: 33°40′38″S 71°06′35″W

Map
- Location of Los Cuatro Diablos Airport in Chile

Runways
Direction	Length		Surface
Direction	m	ft	Surface
08/26	592	1,942	Grass
- Source: Landings.com Google Maps GCM

Los Cuatro Diablos Airport (Spanish: Aeropuerto Los Cuatro Diablos), (ICAO: SCME) is an airport 9 kilometres (5.6 mi) east of Melipilla, a city in the Santiago Metropolitan Region of Chile.

The airport is in the Maipo River valley, and there is rising terrain in all quadrants.

The Melipilla non-directional beacon (Ident: PIL) is located 4.0 nautical miles (7.4 km) west of the runway.

== See also ==
- Transport in Chile
- List of airports in Chile
