= Quenac Airport =

- IATA: none; ICAO: SCQE

Summary
- Airport type: Public
- Serves: Isla Quenac (es), Chile
- Elevation AMSL: 164 ft / 50 m
- Coordinates: 42°27′55″S 73°20′04″W

Map
- Location of Quenac Airport in Chile

Runways
Direction	Length		Surface
Direction	m	ft	Surface
14/32	560	1,837	Grass
- Source: Landings.com Google Maps GCM

Quenac Airport (ICAO: SCQE) is an airstrip serving Isla Quenac (es), an island in the Los Lagos Region of Chile. The island is in the archipelago between the Gulf of Ancud and the Gulf of Corcovado.

The runway is 0.7 kilometres (0.4 mi) south of the shore, and approach and departures to either end will be partially over the water.

The Chaiten VOR-DME (Ident: TEN) is 29.4 nautical miles (54.4 km) southeast of the airstrip.

== See also ==
- Transport in Chile
- List of airports in Chile
