= Hualaihué Airport =

- IATA: none; ICAO: SCHW

Summary
- Airport type: Public
- Serves: Hualaihué, Chile
- Elevation AMSL: 30 ft / 9 m
- Coordinates: 42°01′35″S 72°41′28″W

Map
- Location of Hualaihué Airport in Chile

Runways
Direction	Length		Surface
Direction	m	ft	Surface
14/32	592	1,942	Grass
- Source: Landings.com Google Maps GCM

Hualaihué Airport (ICAO: SCHW) is an airport serving Hualaihué, a village in the Los Lagos Region of Chile.

The runway is at the tip of a small peninsula in the Gulf of Ancud, and an overrun on the southern end drops into the water. There is an isolated peak 2 kilometres (1.2 mi) north of the airport.

== See also ==
- Transport in Chile
- List of airports in Chile
