= Huayanay Airport =

- IATA: none; ICAO: SCOY

Summary
- Airport type: Public
- Serves: Ovalle, Chile
- Elevation AMSL: 164 ft / 50 m
- Coordinates: 30°26′00″S 71°32′05″W

Map
- Location of Huayanay Airport in Chile

Runways
| Direction | Length | | Surface |
| Direction | m | ft | Surface |
|---|---|---|---|
| 15/33 | 888 | 2,913 | Dirt |
- Source: Landings.com Google Maps GCM

Huayanay Airport (Spanish: Aeropuerto de Huayanay), (ICAO: SCOY) is an airstrip 36 kilometres (22 mi) northwest of Ovalle, a city in the Coquimbo Region of Chile.

The airstrip is on a dry ridge 140 kilometres (87 mi) inland from the Pacific coast. There are ravines on all sides close to the runway.

The Tongoy VOR-DME (Ident: TOY) is located 9.7 nautical miles (18.0 km) north of the airstrip.

== See also ==
- Transport in Chile
- List of airports in Chile
