= Colorado Airport =

Colorado Airport Aeropuerto Colorado
- IATA: none; ICAO: SCSK

Summary
- Airport type: Public
- Serves: San Clemente, Chile
- Elevation AMSL: 1,410 ft / 430 m
- Coordinates: 35°39′45″S 71°18′13″W

Map
- Location of Colorado Airport in Chile

Runways
Direction	Length		Surface
Direction	m	ft	Surface
17/35	770	2,526	Grass
- Source: Landings.com Google Maps GCM

Colorado Airport (Spanish: Aeropuerto Colorado, (ICAO: SCSK)) is an airstrip 20 kilometres (12 mi) east of San Clemente, near the village of El Colorado in the Maule Region of Chile.

The airstrip is just north of Colbún Lake, and 3.8 kilometres (2.4 mi) east and upstream of the dam on the Maule River that forms the lake. The area is level around the runway, but there is distant hilly terrain in all quadrants except north.

== See also ==
- Transport in Chile
- List of airports in Chile
