= Alupenhue Airport =

- IATA: none; ICAO: SCXA

Summary
- Airport type: Public
- Serves: Molina, Chile
- Elevation AMSL: 1,600 ft / 488 m
- Coordinates: 35°14′20″S 71°04′15″W

Map
- Location of Alupenhue Airport in Chile

Runways
Direction	Length		Surface
Direction	m	ft	Surface
14/32	707	2,320	Grass
- Source: Landings.com Google Maps GCM

Alupenhue Airport (Spanish: Aeropuerto de Alupenhue), (ICAO: SCXA) is an airport 23 kilometres (14 mi) southeast of Molina, a city in the Maule Region of Chile.

The airport is alongside the Lontué River, 8 kilometres (5.0 mi) upstream from the river's entrance into the Central Valley. There is mountainous terrain in all quadrants.

== See also ==
- Transport in Chile
- List of airports in Chile
