= Achibueno Airport =

Airport in Chile

- IATA: none; ICAO: SCAV

Summary
- Airport type: Private
- Serves: Linares, Chile
- Elevation AMSL: 1,673 ft / 510 m
- Coordinates: 36°08′30″S 71°22′27″W

Map
- Location of the airport in Chile

Runways
Direction	Length		Surface
Direction	m	ft	Surface
15/33	800	2,625	Gravel
- Sources: GCM Google Maps

Achibueno Airport (ICAO: SCAV) is an airport 38 kilometres (24 mi) southeast of Linares, in the Maule Region of Chile. The airport was built in 2013.

The airport is in the narrow valley of the Achibueno River, 23 kilometres (14 mi) upstream from where the river leaves the foothills of the Andes to enter the Chilean Central Valley. There is nearby mountainous terrain in all quadrants.

== See also ==
- Transport in Chile
- List of airports in Chile
