= Chaitén Pumalín Airport =

Pumalín Airport
- IATA: none; ICAO: SCUI

Summary
- Airport type: Public
- Serves: Chaitén, Chile
- Location: Isla Llahuen
- Elevation AMSL: 18 ft / 5 m
- Coordinates: 42°42′05″S 72°50′02″W

Map
- Location of Pumalín Airport in Chile

Runways
| Direction | Length | | Surface |
| Direction | m | ft | Surface |
|---|---|---|---|
| 14/32 | 597 | 1,959 | Gravel |
- Source: Landings.com

Pumalín Airport (Spanish: Aeropuerto de Pumalín, (ICAO: SCUI)) is an airport on Isla Llahuen, the easternmost of the islands separating the Gulf of Ancud from the Gulf of Corcovado. The runway is on a spit at the entrance of the small Pumalín Bay, 26 kilometres (16 mi) north-northwest of Chaitén, a city in the Los Lagos Region of Chile.

Approach and departures are over the water.

The Chaiten non-directional beacon (Ident: TEN) is 14.7 nautical miles (27.2 km) south-southeast of the airport.

== See also ==
- Transport in Chile
- List of airports in Chile
