= El Cardal Airport =

- IATA: none; ICAO: SCKD

Summary
- Airport type: Public
- Serves: Río Bueno, Chile
- Elevation AMSL: 525 ft / 160 m
- Coordinates: 40°28′02″S 72°41′00″W

Map
- Location of El Cardal Airport in Chile

Runways
Direction	Length		Surface
Direction	m	ft	Surface
07/25	1,255	4,117	Asphalt
- Source: Landings.com Google Maps GCM

El Cardal Airport (Spanish: Aeropuerto El Cardal), (ICAO: SCKD) is an airport serving the Río Bueno commune in the Los Ríos Region of Chile.

The airport is 26 kilometres (16 mi) east-southeast of Río Bueno city.

== See also ==
- Transport in Chile
- List of airports in Chile
