= Punta El Saco Airport =

Punta el Saco Airport
- IATA: none; ICAO: SCHM

Summary
- Airport type: Public
- Serves: Isla Mocha, Chile
- Elevation AMSL: 23 ft / 7 m
- Coordinates: 38°24′40″S 73°54′20″W

Map
- Location of Punta el Saco Airport in Chile

Runways
Direction	Length		Surface
Direction	m	ft	Surface
12/30	700	2,297	Grass
- Source: Landings.com Google Maps GCM

Punta el Saco Airport Spanish: Aeropuerto Punta el Saco, (ICAO: SCHM) is an airport on the south shore of Isla Mocha, a small Pacific island 32 kilometres (20 mi) off the coast of Chile. Isla Mocha is part of Chile's Bío Bío Region.

The airport is in a narrow strip between the rocky shore and the coast road. Approach and departures are mostly over the water. There is a large hill northeast of the runway.

The Araucania VOR-DME (Ident: NIA) is located 66.3 nautical miles (122.8 km) east-southeast of the airport. There are no published radio navaids on the island.

== See also ==
- Transport in Chile
- List of airports in Chile
