= Salar de Atacama Airport =

El Salar Airport
- IATA: none; ICAO: SCSL

Summary
- Airport type: Public
- Serves: Salar de Atacama
- Elevation AMSL: 7,550 ft (2,300 m)
- Coordinates: 23°38′56″S 68°18′20″W

Map
- Location of El Salar Airport in Chile

Runways
Direction	Length		Surface
Direction	m	ft	Surface
09/27	2,235	7,333	Clay
- Source: Landings.com Google Maps GCM

El Salar Airport (Spanish: Aeropuerto El Salar, (ICAO: SCSL)) is a high elevation airport serving the mineral salt mining operations on the Salar de Atacama salt flat, in the Antofagasta Region of Chile.

(In several databases the airport has the incorrect ICAO code SCSI.)

== See also ==
- Transport in Chile
- List of airports in Chile
