= Queilén Airport =

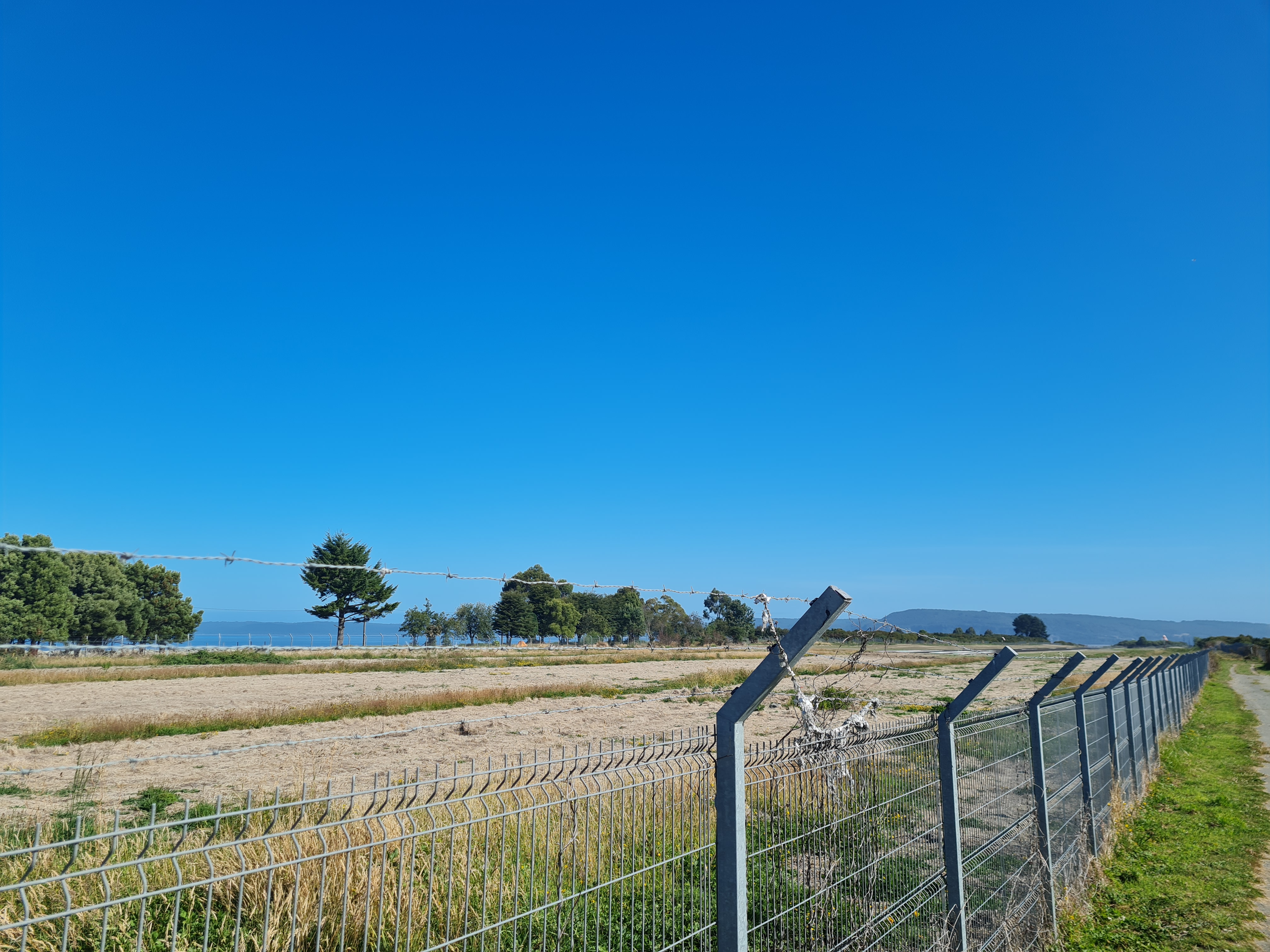
- IATA: none; ICAO: SCQX

Summary
- Airport type: Public
- Serves: Queilén, Chile
- Elevation AMSL: 60 ft / 18 m
- Coordinates: 42°53′35″S 73°28′25″W

Map
- Location of Queilén Airport in Chile

Runways
Direction	Length		Surface
Direction	m	ft	Surface
02/20	600	1,969	Grass
- Source: Landings.com Google Maps GCM

Queilén Airport (Spanish: Aeropuerto de Queilén}, (ICAO: SCQX) is an airport serving Queilén, a town in the Los Lagos Region of Chile. The town and airport are on a peninsula of Chiloé Island, sheltering an inlet off the Gulf of Corcovado.

== See also ==
- Transport in Chile
- List of airports in Chile
