= Alto Cauquenes Airport =

- IATA: none; ICAO: SCCN

Summary
- Airport type: Private
- Serves: Cauquenes, Chile
- Elevation AMSL: 568 ft / 173 m
- Coordinates: 35°52′50″S 72°19′38″W

Map
- Location of Alto Cauquenes Airport in Chile

Runways
Direction	Length		Surface
Direction	m	ft	Surface
18/36	710	2,329	Asphalt
- Source: GCM Google Maps

Alto Cauquenes Airport (Spanish: Aeropuerto Alto Cauquenes), (ICAO: SCCN) is an airport serving Cauquenes, a city in the Maule Region of Chile. The airport is 10 kilometres (6.2 mi) north of the city.

Runway length does not include an additional 80 metres (260 ft) displaced threshold on Runway 18.

== See also ==
- Transport in Chile
- List of airports in Chile
