= Curimanque Airport =

- IATA: none; ICAO: SCKQ

Summary
- Airport type: Public
- Serves: Pucón, Chile
- Elevation AMSL: 1,476 ft / 450 m
- Coordinates: 39°19′37″S 72°1′35″W

Map
- Location of Curimanque Airport in Chile

Runways
Direction	Length		Surface
Direction	m	ft	Surface
08/26	620	2,034	Grass
- Source: Landings.com Google Maps GCM

Curimanque Airport (Spanish: Aeropuerto Curimanque), (ICAO: SCKQ) is an airport 7 kilometres (4.3 mi) southwest of Pucón, a lakeside city in the La Araucanía Region of Chile. The runway is 3 kilometres (1.9 mi) south of Villarrica Lake.

== See also ==
- Transport in Chile
- List of airports in Chile
