= Isla Mocha Airport =

- IATA: none; ICAO: SCIM

Summary
- Airport type: Public
- Serves: Isla Mocha
- Elevation AMSL: 19 ft / 6 m
- Coordinates: 38°23′05″S 73°52′07″W

Map
- Location of Isla Mocha Airport in Chile

Runways
Direction	Length		Surface
Direction	m	ft	Surface
18/36	800	2,625	Asphalt
- Source: Landings.com Google Maps GCM

Isla Mocha Airport (ICAO: SCIM) is an airport on the east side of Isla Mocha, a small Pacific island 32 kilometres (20 mi) off the coast of Chile. Isla Mocha is part of Chile's Bío Bío Region.

The airport lies along the shore, and approach and departures are over the water. The island's central hills lie 1 kilometre (0.6 mi) west of the runway.

The Araucania VOR-DME (Ident: NIA) is located 66.3 nautical miles (122.8 km) east-southeast of the airport. There are no published radio navaids on the island.

== See also ==
- Transport in Chile
- List of airports in Chile
