= Caleta Blanco Airport =

Airport in Caleta Andrade, Chile

Caleta Blanco Airport Caleta Andrade Airport
- IATA: none; ICAO: SCIH

Summary
- Airport type: Public
- Serves: Puerto Aguirre (es), Chile
- Location: Caleta Andrade
- Elevation AMSL: 115 ft / 35 m
- Coordinates: 45°8′55″S 73°30′48″W

Map
- Location of Caleta Blanco Airport in Chile

Runways
Direction	Length		Surface
Direction	m	ft	Surface
12/30	680	2,231	Asphalt
- Source: Landings.com Google Maps GCM

Caleta Blanco Airport Spanish: Aeropuerto Caleta Blanco, (ICAO: SCIH) is an airport serving the villages of Puerto Aguirre (es) and Caleta Andrade (es) on Isla Las Huichas (es), an island in the Aysén Region of Chile.

Isla Las Huichas is in the Chonos Archipelago, on the east side of the Moraleda Channel.

The Puerto Aguirre VOR-DME (Ident: PAR) is located on a hill 0.86 nautical miles (1.6 km) southwest of the airport. It is not aligned with the runway. Approach and departures are over the water.

== See also ==
- Transport in Chile
- List of airports in Chile
