= Santa Cruz Airport (Chile) =

Airport in Chile

Santa Cruz Airport Aeropuerto de Santa Cruz
- IATA: none; ICAO: SCUZ

Summary
- Airport type: Public
- Serves: Santa Cruz, Chile
- Elevation AMSL: 502 ft / 153 m
- Coordinates: 34°38′53″S 71°23′15″W

Map
- Location of Santa Cruz Airport in Chile

Runways
Direction	Length		Surface
Direction	m	ft	Surface
13/31	720	2,362	Gravel
- Source: Landings.com Google Maps GCM

Santa Cruz Airport (Spanish: Aeropuerto de Santa Cruz, (ICAO: SCUZ)) is an airport 2 kilometres (1.2 mi) west of Santa Cruz, a city in the O'Higgins Region of Chile.

The marked runway has a 170 metres (560 ft) overrun on the northwest end, terminated by a hangar. There is hilly terrain 3 kilometres (1.9 mi) west of the runway.

== See also ==
- Transport in Chile
- List of airports in Chile
