= San Nicolás Santa Eugena Airport =

San Nicolás Santa Eugenia Airport Aeropuerto San Nicolás Santa Eugenia
- IATA: none; ICAO: SCNI

Summary
- Airport type: Public
- Serves: San Nicolás, Chile
- Elevation AMSL: 410 ft (120 m)
- Coordinates: 36°26′15″S 72°09′35″W

Map
- Location of Santa Eugenia Airport in Chile

Runways
Direction	Length		Surface
Direction	m	ft	Surface
02/20	650	2,133	Grass
- Source: Landings.com Google Maps GCM

San Nicolás Santa Eugenia Airport (Spanish: Aeropuerto San Nicolás Santa Eugenia, (ICAO: SCNI)) is an airport 8 kilometres (5.0 mi) north of San Nicolás, a town in the Ñuble Region of Chile.

The runway is marked at 650 metres (2,130 ft), but side markers beyond the ends indicate overruns on each end greater than 130 metres (430 ft).

== See also ==
- Transport in Chile
- List of airports in Chile
