= Pergamino Aeroclub =

Airport in Argentina

Pergamino Aeroclub Aeroclub de Pergamino
- IATA: none; ICAO: SAAN

Summary
- Airport type: Public
- Serves: Pergamino, Argentina
- Elevation AMSL: 236 ft / 72 m
- Coordinates: 33°55′15″S 60°38′58″W

Map
- Location of airport in Argentina

Runways
Direction	Length		Surface
Direction	m	ft	Surface
04/22	1,500	4,921	Asphalt
13/31	900	2,953	Grass
- Source: Landings.com Google Maps GCM

Pergamino Aeroclub (Spanish: Aeroclub de Pergamino, ICAO: SAAN) is a public use airport in the countryside 5 kilometres (3 mi) west of Pergamino, a city in the Buenos Aires Province of Argentina.

The Junin VOR (Ident: NIN) is located 40.0 nautical miles (74 km) south-southwest of the airport.

== See also ==
- Transport in Argentina
- List of airports in Argentina
