= Santa Rita Airport (Chile) =

Airstrip in Valparaíso Region, Chile

- IATA: none; ICAO: SCCS

Summary
- Airport type: Public
- Serves: Casablanca, Chile
- Elevation AMSL: 738 ft / 225 m
- Coordinates: 33°16′35″S 71°27′20″W

Map
- Location of Santa Rita Airport in Chile

Runways
Direction	Length		Surface
Direction	m	ft	Surface
03/21	700	2,297	Grass
- Source: SkyVector Google Maps

Santa Rita Airport (ICAO: SCCS) is an airstrip 6 kilometres (3.7 mi) northwest of Casablanca, a city in the Valparaíso Region of Chile.

There is rising terrain north and west of the runway.

The Santo Domingo VOR-DME (Ident: SNO) is located 24.7 nautical miles (45.7 km) south-southwest of the airstrip.

== See also ==
- Transport in Chile
- List of airports in Chile
