= Municipal de Vitacura Airport =

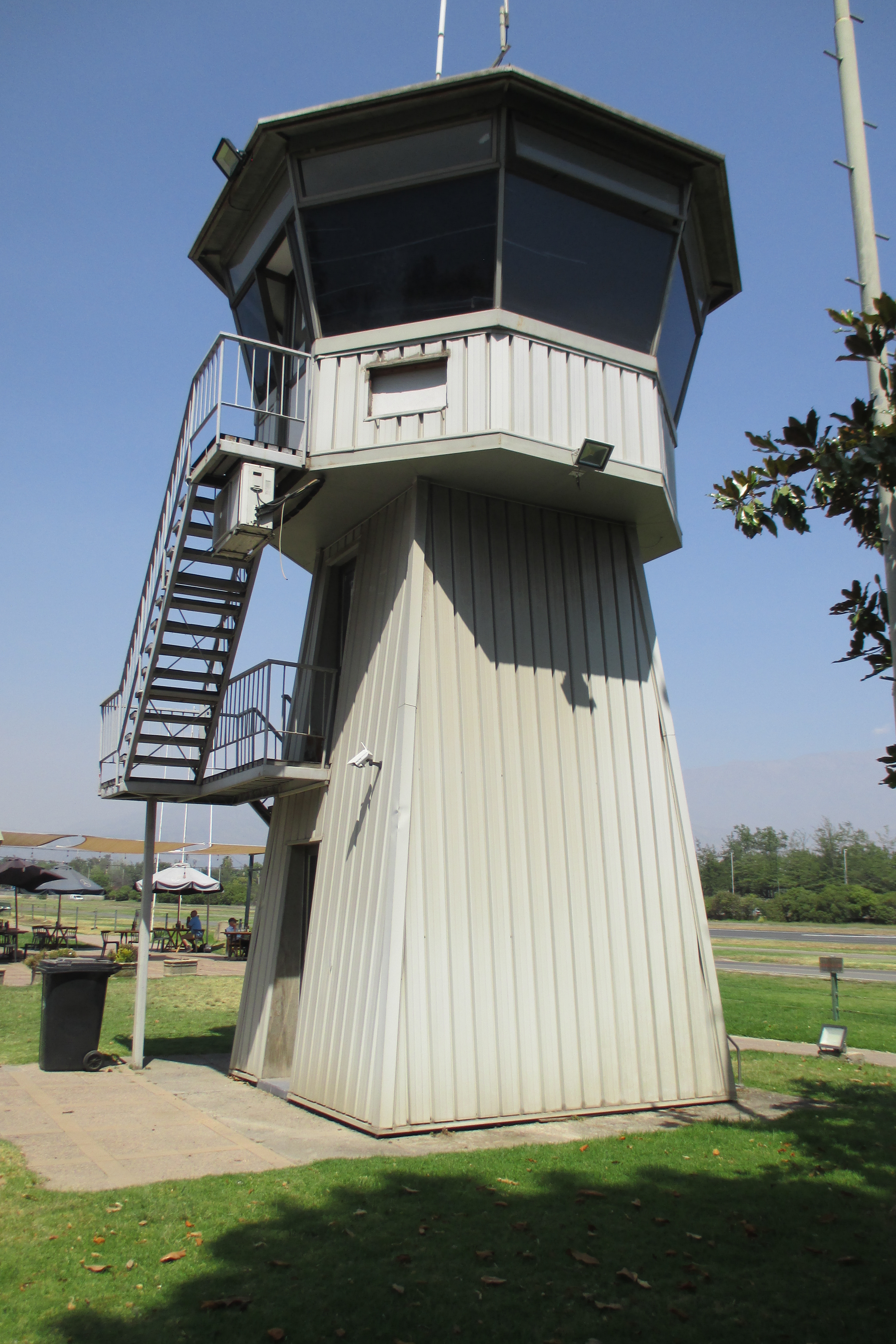
- The control tower of the airfield
- IATA: none; ICAO: SCLC

Summary
- Airport type: Public
- Serves: Santiago, Chile
- Elevation AMSL: 2,247 ft / 685 m
- Coordinates: 33°22′50″S 70°34′55″W

Map
- Location of Municipal de Vitacura Airport in Chile

Runways
Direction	Length		Surface
Direction	m	ft	Surface
07/25	545	1,788	Asphalt
- Source: Landings.com Google Maps GCM

Municipal de Vitacura Airport (ICAO: SCLC) is a general aviation airport in Vitacura, a northern suburb of the Santiago Metropolitan Region of Chile. The airport is in a narrow slot between a major city street in Vitacura and a parallel freeway.

Runway 25 has an additional 200 metres (660 ft) displaced threshold. There is nearby mountainous terrain northwest through northeast.

== See also ==
- Transport in Chile
- List of airports in Chile
