= Viña Tarapacá Airport =

Viña Tarapacá Airport Ventanas Radioayuda Airport
- IATA: none; ICAO: SCVT

Summary
- Airport type: Public
- Serves: Isla de Maipo, Chile
- Elevation AMSL: 1,066 ft / 325 m
- Coordinates: 33°46′01″S 70°55′20″W

Map
- Location of Viña Tarapacá Airport in Chile

Runways
| Direction | Length | | Surface |
| Direction | m | ft | Surface |
|---|---|---|---|
| 09/27 | 670 | 2,198 | Asphalt |
- Source: Landings.com Google Maps GCM

Viña Tarapacá Airport Spanish: Aeropuerto Viña Tarapacá, (ICAO: SCVT) is an airport located 3 kilometres (2 mi) southwest of Isla de Maipo, a town in the Santiago Metropolitan Region of Chile.

The runway lies along the Maipo River. There is distant rising terrain west of the airport.

The Talagante non-directional beacon (Ident: TAL) is located 5.1 nautical miles (9.4 km) north of the airport. The Los Cerrillos VOR-DME (Ident: STI) is located 19.3 nautical miles (35.7 km) northeast of the airport.

== See also ==
- Transport in Chile
- List of airports in Chile
