= Lipangui Airport =

- IATA: none; ICAO: SCKL

Summary
- Airport type: Public
- Serves: Lampa, Chile
- Elevation AMSL: 1,558 ft / 475 m
- Coordinates: 33°20′10″S 70°51′05″W

Map
- Location of Lipangui Airport in Chile

Runways
Direction	Length		Surface
Direction	m	ft	Surface
16/34	500	1,640	Asphalt
- Source: Landings.com Google Maps GCM

Lipangui Airport Spanish: Aeropuerto Lipangui, (ICAO: SCKL) is an airport 6 kilometres (3.7 mi) south-southeast of Lampa, a city in the Santiago Metropolitan Region of Chile.

The Pudahuel VOR-DME (Ident: PDH) is 5.6 nautical miles (10.4 km) south-southeast of the airport.

== See also ==
- Transport in Chile
- List of airports in Chile
