= Rapel, Chile =

Settlement in the O'Higgins Region, Chile

Coordinates: 33.9429°S 71.7362°W

Rapel is a Chilean settlement located an hour away from Melipilla in the commune of Navidad on the O'Higgins Region.

During the summer, becomes a balneary. This settlement is near of the Lake Rapel and the Rapel River. In the homonym river was installed the Rapel Dam. The main economic activities in the zone are agriculture, commerce and services.

== See also ==
- Lake Rapel
- Rapel River
- List of lakes in Chile
- Rapel Dam
- Navidad
