= Isla Apiao Airport =

- IATA: none; ICAO: SCIA

Summary
- Airport type: Public
- Serves: Isla Apiao (es), Chile
- Elevation AMSL: 250 ft / 76 m
- Coordinates: 42°36′20″S 073°12′33″W

Map
- Location of Isla Apiao Airport in Chile

Runways
Direction	Length		Surface
Direction	m	ft	Surface
16/34	600	1,969	Asphalt
- Source: Landings.com Google Maps GCM

Isla Apiao Airport (ICAO: SCIA) is an airport serving Isla Apiao (es), an island in the archipelago separating the Gulf of Ancud from the Gulf of Corcovado in the Los Lagos Region of Chile.

The Chaiten VOR-DME (Ident: TEN) is 19.8 nautical miles (36.7 km) southeast of the airport.

== See also ==
- Transport in Chile
- List of airports in Chile
