= Russfin Airport =

Airport in Tierra del Fuego Province, Chile

- IATA: none; ICAO: SCFN

Summary
- Airport type: Public
- Serves: Timaukel, Chile
- Elevation AMSL: 684 ft / 208 m
- Coordinates: 53°47′55″S 69°07′10″W

Map
- Location of Russfin Airport in Chile

Runways
Direction	Length		Surface
Direction	ft	m	Surface
06/24		1,210	Gravel
09/27		1,180	Gravel
- Sources: OurAirports Google Maps

Russfin Airport (ICAO: SCFN) is an airport serving the Timaukel commune of the Magallanes y Antártica Chilena Region of Chile. The runways are 40 kilometres (25 mi) inland from the village of Camerón.

== See also ==
- Transport in Chile
- List of airports in Chile
