= Rucañanco Airport =

Airport in Chile

- IATA: none; ICAO: SCRQ

Summary
- Airport type: Public
- Serves: Río Bueno, Chile
- Elevation AMSL: 502 ft / 153 m
- Coordinates: 40°31′20″S 72°46′25″W

Map
- Location of Rucañanco Airport in Chile

Runways
Direction	Length		Surface
Direction	m	ft	Surface
01/19	600	1,969	Grass
- Source: Landings.com Google Maps

Rucañanco Airport (Spanish: Aeropuerto Rucañanco) (ICAO: SCRQ) is an airstrip serving the Río Bueno commune in the Los Ríos Region of Chile.

The Osorno VOR-DME (Ident: OSO) is located 14.1 nautical miles (26.1 km) west-southwest of the airstrip. The runway is crossed by a road 280 metres (920 ft) from the south end, and has an additional 140 metres (460 ft) unpaved overrun on the north end.

== See also ==
- Transport in Chile
- List of airports in Chile
