= Quemchi Airport =

- IATA: none; ICAO: SCQW

Summary
- Airport type: Public
- Serves: Quemchi, Chile
- Elevation AMSL: 393 ft / 120 m
- Coordinates: 42°9′15″S 73°31′12″W

Map
- Location of Quemchi Airport in Chile

Runways
Direction	Length		Surface
Direction	m	ft	Surface
18/36	580	1,903	Clay
- Source: Landings.com Google Maps GCM

Quemchi Airport (Spanish: Aeropuerto de Quemchi), (ICAO: SCQW) is an airport 4 kilometres (2.5 mi) west of Quemchi, a coastal town in the Los Lagos Region of Chile. Quemchi is on Chiloé Island, on an inlet off the Gulf of Ancud.

== See also ==
- Transport in Chile
- List of airports in Chile
