= Río Negro Airport =

Airport in Chile

- IATA: none; ICAO: SCRN

Summary
- Airport type: Public
- Serves: Hornopirén, Chile
- Elevation AMSL: 10 ft / 3 m
- Coordinates: 41°57′40″S 72°27′10″W

Map
- Location of Río Negro Airport in Chile

Runways
Direction	Length		Surface
Direction	m	ft	Surface
02/20	720	2,362	Asphalt
- Sources: Bing Maps SkyVector

Río Negro Airport (Spanish: Aeropuerto de Río Negro, (ICAO: SCRN)) is an airport serving Hornopirén, a village in the Los Lagos Region of Chile.

The runway is 1 kilometre (0.6 mi) east of the village. The airport and village are at the north end of a salt water inlet off the Gulf of Ancud, and approaches from the south are over the water. There is high and mountainous terrain in all quadrants.

== See also ==
- Transport in Chile
- List of airports in Chile
