= Las Tacas =

- Resort
- Interactive map of Las Tacas
- Country: Chile
- Region: Coquimbo Region
- Province: Elqui Province
- Commune: Coquimbo

Las Tacas is a resort in the commune of Coquimbo, Chile. The area is a private resort and real estate development project designed by the architecture firm Archiplan. Its initial phase was completed in February 1993.

This private property coexists with local fishing and gathering activities, offering free beach access to the public and fishermen alike.
