= List of rivers of the O'Higgins Region =

The information regarding List of rivers in the O'Higgins Region on this page has been compiled from the data supplied by GeoNames. It includes all features named "Rio", "Canal", "Arroyo", "Estero" and those Feature Code is associated with a stream of water. (Note: The arbitrarily selected codes are RPDS, CHN, CNLA, CNLB, CNLD, CNLI, CNLN, CNLSB, CRKT, DTCH, DTCHI, DTCHD, ESTY, FORD, SBED, STM, STMA, STMB, STMC, STMD, STMH, STMI, STMIX, STMM, STMQ, STMS, STMSB, STMX, TNLC, WTRC, WTRH) This list contains 156 water streams.

== Content ==
This list contains:

1. Name of the stream, in Spanish Language
2. Coordinates are latitude and longitude of the feature in ± decimal degrees, at the mouth of the stream
3. Link to a map including the Geonameid (a number which uniquely identifies a Geoname feature)
4. Feature Code explained in
5. Other names for the same feature, if any
6. Basin countries additional to Chile, if any

== List ==
Maule, Mataquito and Rapel Rivers basins

- Río Rapel • 33.90418°S 71.83147°W • 3873714 • STM

- Estero de Alhué • 34.14323°S 71.38569°W • 3900111 • STM

- Estero Carén • 34.1162°S 71.09608°W • 3896674 • STM • (Estero Caren, Estero Carén)

- Río Cachapoal • 34.27486°S 71.43436°W • 3897523 • STM • (Rio Cachapoal, Río Cachapoal)

- Estero Zamorano • 34.41443°S 71.17903°W • 3867577 • STM • (Estero Zamorano)
- Río Claro (de Rengo) • 34.27183°S 70.58612°W • 3894572 • STM
- Estero de Las Cadenas • 34.19084°S 70.84177°W • 3884567 • STM • (Esteno de La Cadena, Estero Cadena, Estero Cadenas, Estero de Las Cadenas)
- Río Coya • 34.20764°S 70.53037°W • 3893334 • STM • (Arroyo Coya, Estero Coya, Rio Coya, Río Coya)
- Río Pangal • 34.23498°S 70.47956°W • 3877389 • STM

- Río Los Cipreses • 34.32771°S 70.40819°W • 3882194 • STM • (Rio Cipreses, Rio Los Cipreses, Río Cipreses, Río Los Cipreses)

- Río Tinguiririca • 34.28331°S 71.43645°W • 3869789 • STM

- Estero Chimbarongo • 34.54919°S 71.37185°W • 3895059 • STM • (Estero Chimbarongo, Rio de Chimbarongo, Río de Chimbarongo)
- Río Claro (Tinguiririca) • 34.39959°S 71.12689°W • 3894571 • STM

- Estero de Nilahue • 34.51821°S 71.98479°W • 3878649 • STM

- Estero Las Palmas • 34.15784°S 71.36154°W • 3884083 • STM • (Estero Las Palmas, Estero de las Palmas)

- Estero de La Población • 34.65372°S 71.90092°W • 3884956 • STM
- Estero Navidad • 33.93932°S 71.84764°W • 3878975 • STMI
- Río San Francisco • 33.94644°S 70.71584°W • 3872209 • STM
- Estero de Matanzas • 33.96492°S 71.86712°W • 3880350 • STM • (Estero Matanza, Estero de Matanzas)
- Estero Troncó • 33.97604°S 70.71744°W • 3869049 • STM
- Estero de Codegua • 33.97622°S 70.71786°W • 3894462 • STM
- Estero Picarquín • 33.9866°S 70.67732°W • 3876332 • STM • (Cajon de Picarquin, Cajón de Picarquín, Estero Picarquin, Estero Picarquín)
- Estero de las Viedmas • 33.98716°S 70.67765°W • 3868265 • STM
- Estero Seco • 34.05141°S 70.67754°W • 3871060 • STM
- Estero Las Arenas • 34.05152°S 71.48939°W • 3884628 • STM
- Estero de la Poza Honda • 34.0759°S 71.57916°W • 3875243 • STM
- Estero del Teniente • 34.08333°S 70.4°W • 3869987 • STM
- Estero de Salto del Agua • 34.0883°S 71.53661°W • 3872498 • STM
- Estero Pulín • 34.09256°S 71.54984°W • 3874884 • STM
- Estero Manantiales • 34.09627°S 71.60904°W • 3880757 • STM
- Estero Manquehue • 34.10884°S 71.72698°W • 3880680 • STM
- Estero Los Lingues • 34.10905°S 71.7276°W • 3881946 • STM • (Estero Lingues, Estero Los Lingues)
- Estero Machalí • 34.11295°S 70.71079°W • 3881100 • STM • (Arroyo Machali, Estero Machali, Estero Machalí)
- Estero de las Delicias • 34.11667°S 70.71667°W • 3892673 • STM
- Estero del Valle • 34.11868°S 71.92786°W • 3868663 • STMI
- Estero Los Quillayes • 34.11912°S 71.92795°W • 3881457 • STM
- Estero Topocalma • 34.12124°S 71.96001°W • 3869624 • STM
- Estero del Cuzco • 34.12158°S 71.5603°W • 3892782 • STM
- Estero San Francisco • 34.14122°S 71.73954°W • 3872217 • STM
- Estero del Agua Buena • 34.14798°S 71.86215°W • 3900572 • STM
- Estero El Manzano • 34.16895°S 71.40487°W • 3891077 • STM
- Quebrada Culenar • 34.17973°S 71.86172°W • 3893058 • STM • (Estero del Culenar, Quebrada Culenar, Quebrada Culenes)
- Agua del Estero • 34.18909°S 70.61825°W • 3900526 • STM
- Estero de Quilicura • 34.18961°S 71.32928°W • 3874207 • STM
- Estero Cartagena • 34.19393°S 71.81493°W • 3896429 • STM • (Estero Carjena, Estero Cartagena, Estero Cartajena)
- Estero El Cajón • 34.19933°S 71.70198°W • 3891800 • STM
- Estero El Cóguil • 34.20637°S 71.81248°W • 3891580 • STM
- Estero Seco • 34.20997°S 71.63893°W • 3871059 • STM
- Estero del Maule • 34.21667°S 71.01667°W • 3880308 • STM
- Canal de las Acacias • 34.21667°S 71.05°W • 3900719 • DTCH
- Arroyo Laguna • 34.21822°S 70.7117°W • 3885795 • STM • (Arroyo Laguna, Estero Cauquenes, Estero Laguna)
- Arroyo Flores • 34.22576°S 70.25935°W • 3889437 • STM • (Arroyo Flores, Estero Flores)
- Estero de Clonqui • 34.22676°S 70.49406°W • 3894541 • STM • (Estero de Clonqui, Quebrada Conqui)
- Río Paredones • 34.228°S 70.25892°W • 3877181 • STM
- Estero Las Damas • 34.23471°S 71.75333°W • 3884396 • STM • (Estero Las Damas, Estero de las Damas)
- Estero Mamá • 34.23505°S 70.17797°W • 3880782 • STM • (Arroyo Mama, Estero Mama, Estero Mamá)
- Estero El Ganso • 34.24083°S 71.79102°W • 3891327 • STM • (Estero El Ganso, Estero del Ganso)
- Estero Las Garzas • 34.24093°S 71.7917°W • 3884352 • STM
- Río Blanco • 34.24094°S 70.31897°W • 3898213 • STM
- Canal del Parral • 34.2456°S 71.05684°W • 3877145 • DTCH
- Estero Alonso de Morales • 34.25969°S 71.58218°W • 3900022 • STM
- Estero Mallermo • 34.2747°S 71.54232°W • 3880835 • STM • (Estero Mallermo, Estero Miguel Chico)
- Estero Purén • 34.27604°S 71.07608°W • 3874611 • STM
- Canal de Cocalán • 34.2788°S 71.27398°W • 3894508 • DTCH
- Estero Pailimo • 34.28104°S 71.77127°W • 3877748 • STMX
- Estero Cachantun • 34.28333°S 70.98333°W • 3897528 • STM
- Estero Poza del Toro • 34.28574°S 71.97366°W • 3875244 • STM
- Estero Palmilla • 34.289°S 71.34134°W • 3877594 • STM
- Estero San Miguel • 34.30172°S 71.4546°W • 3871895 • STM
- Estero de Las Cadenas • 34.30224°S 71.45388°W • 3884566 • STM • (Estero Cadenas, Estero de Las Cadenas)
- Estero de Los Valles • 34.33295°S 71.83913°W • 3881295 • STM
- Canal de Quilicura • 34.3°S 71.28333°W • 3874209 • DTCH
- Canal Las Cabras • 34.3°S 71.3°W • 3884579 • DTCH
- Estero Grande • 34.3°S 71.05°W • 3888816 • STM
- Estero Chillehue • 34.3°S 71.01667°W • 3895076 • STM
- Estero de Idahue • 34.3554°S 71.14712°W • 3887377 • STM
- Estero Pichiguao • 34.35956°S 70.81991°W • 3876270 • STM
- Río de Las Leñas • 34.36317°S 70.30773°W • 3884242 • STM • (Rio de Las Lenas, Rio de las Lenas, Río de Las Leñas, Río de las Leñas)
- Río Cortaderal • 34.3661°S 70.33529°W • 3893421 • STM • (Rio Cortaderal, Rio de las Cortaderas, Río Cortaderal, Río de las Cortaderas)
- Estero La Rosa • 34.37159°S 71.67542°W • 3884701 • STM • (Estero La Rosa, Estero La Rosas)
- Estero del Sauce • 34.37224°S 71.67533°W • 3871200 • STM
- Estero Tipaume • 34.37502°S 70.8642°W • 3869780 • STM
- Estero de Calleuque • 34.37734°S 71.42951°W • 3897237 • STM • (Estero Guirivilco, Estero Gurivllo, Estero de Calleuque, Guiribilo)
- Estero Chequén • 34.38556°S 71.62829°W • 3895242 • STM
- Estero de Trinidad • 34.39179°S 71.49874°W • 3869079 • STMI
- Estero Yerbas Buenas • 34.39515°S 71.65272°W • 3867662 • STM
- Canal de Almahue • 34.40349°S 71.30987°W • 3900060 • DTCH
- Canal El Durazno • 34.41667°S 71.15°W • 3891454 • DTCH
- Estero Peralillo • 34.41847°S 71.49306°W • 3876550 • STM
- Canal de Los Palquiales • 34.42121°S 71.3055°W • 3881641 • DTCH
- Estero del Peñón • 34.43333°S 70.88333°W • 3876621 • STM
- Estero Carrizal • 34.43371°S 71.67591°W • 3896497 • STM
- Estero del Monte • 34.43399°S 71.67541°W • 3879480 • STMI
- Estero La Condenada • 34.43442°S 71.375°W • 3886206 • STM
- Estero de Lihueimo • 34.43467°S 71.41856°W • 3883242 • STM
- Estero de La Araña • 34.43495°S 71.37538°W • 3886551 • STM
- Canal Errázuriz • 34.4°S 70.85°W • 3889995 • DTCH
- Canal Chuchue • 34.4°S 70.9°W • 3894787 • DTCH
- Estero de los Cipreses • 34.44088°S 70.30225°W • 3894614 • STM • (Arroyo de los Cipreses, Estero de los Cipreses)
- Estero Seco • 34.45°S 70.96667°W • 3871058 • STM
- Estero Huinica • 34.45555°S 70.9559°W • 3887492 • STM
- Estero Antivero • 34.45945°S 70.97°W • 3899540 • STM • (Arroyo Antivero, Estero Antivero)
- Canal del Huique • 34.46679°S 71.30278°W • 3887488 • DTCH
- Estero de Cuenca • 34.48251°S 70.85544°W • 3893148 • STM • (Estero de Cuenca, Quebrada Cuenca)
- Estero Maquis • 34.4967°S 70.80061°W • 3880566 • STM • (Arroyo Los Maquis, Arroyo Maquis, Estero Maquis)
- Estero Maravillas • 34.51156°S 70.2275°W • 3880550 • STM
- Estero del Charquicán • 34.51667°S 70.98333°W • 3895371 • STM
- Estero Rama • 34.5216°S 70.96904°W • 3873827 • STM
- Estero Colhue • 34.53349°S 71.63066°W • 3894286 • STM
- Estero El Quillay • 34.5394°S 71.98346°W • 3890612 • STM
- Estero Colorado • 34.55398°S 70.21034°W • 3894054 • STM • (Arroyo Colorado, Estero Colorado)
- Estero de Las Toscas • 34.56501°S 71.41495°W • 3883847 • STM • (Estero de Las Toscas, Rio Las Toscas, Río Las Toscas)
- Estero La Viña • 34.58002°S 71.78912°W • 3883524 • STM
- Estero El Calvario • 34.58181°S 71.92888°W • 3891786 • STM • (Estero El Calvario, Quebrada Calbario)
- Estero de las Cardas • 34.58438°S 71.78825°W • 3896729 • STM
- Quebrada de Llope • 34.62157°S 71.63659°W • 3882839 • STMI • (Estero Llope, Quebrada de Llope)
- Estero Paredones • 34.62783°S 71.98799°W • 3877184 • STM
- Estero de Los Laureles • 34.63421°S 71.4938°W • 3881963 • STM
- Estero Pumanque • 34.63593°S 71.77333°W • 3874842 • STM
- Estero Membrillo • 34.65324°S 71.90072°W • 3880071 • STM
- Canal Población • 34.65718°S 71.31839°W • 3875600 • DTCH
- Canal Velazquino • 34.66667°S 71.33333°W • 3868515 • DTCH
- Canal San Miguel • 34.66667°S 71.03333°W • 3871899 • DTCH
- Canal San Juan • 34.66667°S 70.9°W • 3872028 • DTCH
- Canal Ruiz • 34.66667°S 70.9°W • 3872709 • DTCH
- Río Claro • 34.67486°S 70.88056°W • 3894570 • STM
- Estero de Las Toscas • 34.68183°S 71.24644°W • 3883846 • STM
- Estero de Los Cardos • 34.6864°S 71.44189°W • 3882259 • STM • (Estero de Los Cardos, Estero de los Cardos)
- Estero de Panamá • 34.6865°S 71.44261°W • 3877454 • STM
- Estero Truncalemu • 34.68944°S 71.2277°W • 3869004 • STM
- Estero Pudimávida • 34.69059°S 71.22832°W • 3875057 • STM
- Estero Lolol • 34.69368°S 71.7579°W • 3882650 • STM • (Arroyo Lolol, Estero Lolol)
- Estero Nerquihue • 34.7133°S 71.60566°W • 3878733 • STM • (Estero Nerquihue, Estero de Norquihue, Quebrada Nerquihue)
- Estero Las Ovejas • 34.71614°S 71.68036°W • 3884110 • STM • (Estero Las Ovejas, Estero las Ovejas)
- Estero La Fortaleza • 34.72036°S 71.57388°W • 3885930 • STM • (Estero Fortaleza, Estero La Fortaleza)
- Estero Lima • 34.72443°S 71.312°W • 3883215 • STM
- Estero del Zapal • 34.7249°S 71.31168°W • 3867561 • STM
- Estero San Pedro de Alcántara • 34.72901°S 71.99872°W • 3871782 • STM • (Estero San Pedro de Alcantara, Estero San Pedro de Alcántara, Estero de Alcantara, Estero de Alcántara)
- Estero San Antonio • 34.73418°S 71.33267°W • 3872378 • STM
- Estero de Quiahue • 34.75096°S 71.76356°W • 3874305 • STM
- Estero Los Canales El Molino • 34.75727°S 71.10646°W • 3882296 • STM
- Río San Andrés • 34.7575°S 70.43972°W • 3872425 • STM
- Estero de La Candelaria • 34.76334°S 71.38104°W • 3886365 • STMI • (Arroyo de La Candelaria, Estero de La Candelaria, Estero de la Candelaria)
- Estero de Las Garzas • 34.7677°S 71.83373°W • 3884349 • STMI • (Estero de Las Garzas, Quebrada de Las Garza)
- Estero Quintana • 34.79111°S 71.05783°W • 3873994 • STM • (Estero Carrizal, Estero Quintana)
- Canal La Platina • 34.791°S 71.08211°W • 3884971 • DTCH
- Estero El Buitre • 34.79203°S 71.04814°W • 3891811 • STM • (Estero Buitre, Estero El Buitre)
- Río Portillo • 34.79781°S 70.48203°W • 3875375 • STM
- Estero Helado • 34.82535°S 70.56099°W • 3888128 • STM • (Arroyo Helado, Estero Helado)
- Río del Azufre • 34.82615°S 70.55999°W • 3899049 • STM
- Estero El Piral • 34.83333°S 71.43333°W • 3890687 • STM
- Estero Fray Carlos • 34.83408°S 70.42112°W • 3889328 • STM • (Arroyo Fray Carlos, Estero Fray Carlos)
- Estero La Peñuela • 34.85053°S 71.56144°W • 3885038 • STM
- Estero Las Palmas • 34.85109°S 71.56136°W • 3884082 • STM • (Estero Las Palmas, Estero Palmas)
- Estero San Ramón • 34.85499°S 71.49771°W • 3871732 • STM
- Río Palacios • 34.90207°S 70.34047°W • 3877657 • STM
- Río de las Damas • 34.96363°S 70.40263°W • 3892748 • STM • (Rio de Las Damas, Rio de las Damas, Río de Las Damas, Río de las Damas)

== See also ==
- List of lakes in Chile
- List of volcanoes in Chile
- List of islands of Chile
- List of fjords, channels, sounds and straits of Chile
- List of lighthouses in Chile
