= List of rivers of the Santiago Metropolitan Region =

This is a list of rivers in the Santiago Metropolitan Region, Chile. Data in this article has been compiled from the data supplied by GeoNames. It includes all features named "Rio", "Canal", "Arroyo", "Estero" and those Feature Code is associated with a stream of water. (Note: The arbitrarily selected codes are RPDS, CHN, CNLA, CNLB, CNLD, CNLI, CNLN, CNLSB, CRKT, DTCH, DTCHI, DTCHD, ESTY, FORD, SBED, STM, STMA, STMB, STMC, STMD, STMH, STMI, STMIX, STMM, STMQ, STMS, STMSB, STMX, TNLC, WTRC, WTRH) This list contains 211 water streams.

== Content ==
This list contains:

1. Name of the stream, in Spanish Language
2. Coordinates are latitude and longitude of the feature in ± decimal degrees, at the mouth of the stream
3. Link to a map including the Geonameid (a number which uniquely identifies a Geoname feature)
4. Feature Code explained in
5. Other names for the same feature, if any
6. Basin countries additional to Chile, if any

== List ==
Maipo, Aconcagua and Petorca Rivers basins

- Estero de Dolores • 33.16474°S 70.33203°W • 3892323 • STM
- Río Maipo • 33.61305°S 71.62949°W • 3880983 • STM

- Río Puangue • 33.73959°S 71.35788°W • 3875116 • STM • (Estero Puangue, Estero de Pangue, Estero de Pedegua)
- Río Mapocho • 33.70974°S 71.02074°W • 3880596 • STM • (Rio Mapocho, Río Mapocho)

- Río Lampa • 33.38502°S 70.83985°W • 3885272 • STM • (Estero de Lampa, Rio de Lampa, Río de Lampa)

- Río Colina • 33.38527°S 70.83951°W • 3894235 • STM • (Estero Colina, Estero de Colina, Rio Colina, Río Colina)

- Estero de Polpaico • 33.20025°S 70.89913°W • 3875489 • STM
- Estero de Chacabuco • 33.2006°S 70.89849°W • 3895797 • STM

- Estero de El Arrayán • 33.36236°S 70.48864°W • 3891939 • STM • (Cajon de Arrayan, Cajón de Arrayan, Estero Los Arrayanes, Estero de El Arrayan, Estero de El Arrayán, Estero del Arrayan, Estero del Arrayán)
- Río San Francisco • 33.3733°S 70.39784°W • 3872210 • STM

- Río Molina • 33.37369°S 70.39694°W • 3879619 • STM
- Estero de la Yerba Loca • 33.3444°S 70.36417°W • 3867675 • STM

- Río Angostura • 33.78247°S 70.90457°W • 3899602 • STM
- Río Colorado • 33.596°S 70.37395°W • 3894031 • STM

- Río Olivares • 33.49501°S 70.13885°W • 3878097 • STM

- Río Yeso • 33.75849°S 70.16652°W • 3867648 • STM
- Río Volcán • 33.80668°S 70.21767°W • 3867968 • STM • (Rio El Volcan, Rio Volcan, Río El Volcán, Río Volcán)

- Río Rapel • 33.93802°S 71.75572°W • 3873717 • STM (See affluents in List of rivers of the O'Higgins Region)
- Estero El Extravío • 33.93458°S 70.21898°W • 3891362 • STM • (Arroyo El Extravio, Estero El Extravio, Estero El Extravío, Estero del Extravio, Estero del Extravío)
- Estero del Rosario • 33.96976°S 71.70257°W • 3872813 • STM • (Estero El Rosario, Estero del Rosario)
- Estero El Chorrillo • 34.07944°S 71.71747°W • 3891623 • STM
- Río del Plomo • 32.76523°S 70.72837°W • 3875613 • STM
- Estero de Las Mazas • 32.95°S 70.83333°W • 3884191 • STMI
- Estero de Los Valles • 32.95431°S 70.82203°W • 3881294 • STMI
- Estero de Los Campos • 33.00495°S 70.89128°W • 3882299 • STMI • (Estero de Los Campos, Estero de los Campos)
- Estero Caleu • 33.02009°S 70.91852°W • 3897285 • STM
- Estero Rungue • 33.02037°S 70.91793°W • 3872687 • STM
- Estero La Margarita • 33.06667°S 70.75°W • 3885386 • STM • (Estero La Margarita, Estero Margarita) • (CL)
- Estero de La Providencia • 33.15°S 71.1°W • 3884904 • STM
- Quebrada La Leonera • 33.16228°S 70.63082°W • 3885467 • STM • (Cajon de la Leonera, Estero La Leonera, Estero Leonera, Quebrada La Leonera)
- Estero Tiltil • 33.16687°S 70.88867°W • 3869820 • STM
- Estero de Peldehue • 33.17629°S 70.87127°W • 3876790 • STM
- Estero de Los Piches • 33.21245°S 70.34029°W • 3881559 • STM
- Canal Batuco • 33.22392°S 70.77498°W • 3898594 • DTCH
- Estero Cordillera Ferrosa • 33.2318°S 70.14643°W • 3893578 • STM
- Estero Esmeralda • 33.24436°S 70.12626°W • 3889892 • STM
- Estero de Las Pircas • 33.2544°S 70.12532°W • 3884008 • STM
- Canal de Lo Pinto • 33.26667°S 70.73333°W • 3882501 • DTCH
- Estero Leonera • 33.26761°S 70.29695°W • 3883348 • STMI
- Estero de Carén • 33.27721°S 71.12131°W • 3896673 • STM
- Estero Los Castaños • 33.27808°S 70.14072°W • 3882248 • STM
- Estero Paramillos • 33.30066°S 70.1402°W • 3877207 • STMI
- Estero La Leonera • 33.31067°S 70.32245°W • 3885469 • STM • (Estero La Leonera, Estero Leonera)
- Estero Las Yaretas • 33.31177°S 70.21978°W • 3883755 • STM
- Río Lomas Coloradas • 33.31964°S 70.14105°W • 3882600 • STM
- Estero El Carrizo • 33.32182°S 70.55581°W • 3891686 • STMI
- Río Barros Negros • 33.33333°S 70.3°W • 3898647 • STM
- Estero Manzanito • 33.3504°S 70.36501°W • 3880630 • STM • (Estero Barros Negros, Estero Manzanito)
- Río Tupungato • 33.35137°S 69.88965°W • 3868900 • STM
- Estero de Las Rosas • 33.35°S 70.53333°W • 3883922 • STMI
- El Manzano Estero • 33.35°S 70.53333°W • 3891068 • STMI
- Río Potrerillos • 33.35481°S 70.13364°W • 3875314 • STM
- Estero de las Ramadas • 33.36261°S 70.13474°W • 3873821 • STMI • (Estero de Las Ramadas, Estero de las Ramadas)
- Estero Las Bayas • 33.36384°S 70.23728°W • 3884599 • STMI
- Canal de Quilicura • 33.36667°S 70.78333°W • 3874210 • DTCH
- Estero Manantial Amargo • 33.36667°S 70.53333°W • 3880768 • STM
- Río Tupungatito • 33.36832°S 69.91134°W • 3868904 • STM
- Estero de Las Gualtatas • 33.3693°S 70.51984°W • 3884342 • STM
- Estero del Mauco • 33.37228°S 71.26811°W • 3880319 • STM • (Estero del Manco, Estero del Mauco)
- Estero de La Viña • 33.38333°S 71.16667°W • 3883523 • STM
- Estero El Risco • 33.38356°S 70.33006°W • 3890535 • STM
- Río del Cepo • 33.3839°S 70.26509°W • 3895909 • STM • (Estero del Cepo, Rio de Capo, Rio del Cepo, Río de Capo, Río del Cepo)
- Estero Las Tinajas • 33.38426°S 70.26576°W • 3883883 • STMI
- Estero Los Recauquenes • 33.38668°S 70.37506°W • 3881420 • STM
- Río Montenegro • 33°S 70.88333°W • 3879432 • STMI
- Estero Covarrubias • 33.39808°S 70.379°W • 3893341 • STM
- Río Azufre • 33.40048°S 69.96761°W • 3899051 • STM • (Estero del Azufre, Rio Azufre, Río Azufre)
- Río Museo • 33.40763°S 69.98128°W • 3879141 • STM • (Estero del Museo, Rio Museo, Río Museo)
- Estero de Cuyuncaví • 33.40965°S 71.12583°W • 3892783 • STM • (Estero Curacavi, Estero Curacaví, Estero de Cuyuncavi, Estero de Cuyuncaví)
- Estero Rabicano • 33.41322°S 69.99579°W • 3873885 • STM
- Estero de Zapata • 33.41411°S 71.15397°W • 3867531 • STM
- Canal El Carmen • 33.41559°S 70.61205°W • 3891705 • DTCH
- Canal Santo Domingo • 33.41667°S 70.63333°W • 3871320 • DTCH
- Canal San Carlos • 33.41667°S 70.63333°W • 3872323 • DTCH
- Estero de Miraflores • 33.41667°S 71.08333°W • 3879719 • STM
- Estero de Las Cruces • 33.42838°S 70.83918°W • 3884423 • STM
- Estero Los Panguiles • 33.43333°S 71.03333°W • 3881637 • STM
- Estero de La Jarilla • 33.43581°S 70.1347°W • 3885563 • STM • (Estero de La Jarilla, Estero de la Jarilla)
- Estero Frío • 33.44253°S 70.13459°W • 3889292 • STM
- Estero Chacayal • 33.44931°S 70.01912°W • 3895735 • STM
- Estero Maitenes • 33.4493°S 70.13307°W • 3880928 • STM
- Estero Parraguirre • 33.44945°S 70.02428°W • 3877148 • STM
- Estero del Zanjón • 33.4596°S 70.13087°W • 3867566 • STM
- Canal de Las Mercedes • 33.47184°S 71.26432°W • 3884178 • DTCH
- Canal Valledor • 33.48333°S 70.66667°W • 3868649 • DTCH
- Canal San Joaquín • 33.48333°S 70.65°W • 3872138 • DTCH
- Estero de Los Ángeles • 33.48333°S 71.26667°W • 3882422 • STM • (Estero Angeles, Estero Anjeles, Estero de Los Angeles, Estero de Los Ángeles) • (CL)
- Canal de Ibacache • 33.48333°S 71.28333°W • 3887406 • DTCH
- Estero de Las Vacas • 33.48531°S 70.04962°W • 3883810 • STM
- Estero del Relbo • 33.49534°S 70.1098°W • 3873522 • STM
- Estero de Quempo • 33.50863°S 70.20323°W • 3874386 • STM
- Canal María Pinto • 33.51667°S 71.18333°W • 3880485 • DTCH
- Canal de La Rinconada • 33.51667°S 70.83333°W • 3884709 • DTCH
- Canal de La Patagüilla • 33.51667°S 71.08333°W • 3885072 • DTCH
- Estero del Durazno • 33.52563°S 70.25099°W • 3892120 • STM
- Río Potrerillos • 33.52801°S 70.27976°W • 3881518 • STM
- Estero de Las Mariposas • 33.52915°S 71.25195°W • 3884200 • STM • (Estero de La Mariposa, Estero de Las Mariposas)
- Estero Aucayes • 33.53248°S 70.27066°W • 3899156 • STM
- Estero de Améstica • 33.53451°S 71.20197°W • 3899783 • STM
- Canal de Ochagavía • 33.5°S 70.81667°W • 3878370 • DTCH
- Canal de Ortuzur • 33.5536°S 70.75141°W • 3877965 • DTCH
- Estero del Sauce • 33.55604°S 70.31162°W • 3871202 • STM
- Estero de Las Higueras • 33.56567°S 71.23279°W • 3884323 • STM • (Estero de Las Higueras, Estero de la Higuera, Estero de las Higueras)
- Canal de Manzano • 33.56667°S 71.18333°W • 3880618 • DTCH
- Canal de Mallarauco • 33.56667°S 71.01667°W • 3880851 • DTCH
- Canal de El Colorado • 33.56667°S 70.53333°W • 3891567 • DTCH
- Estero de Los Mayos • 33.56749°S 71.24445°W • 3881767 • STM • (Estero de Los Magos, Estero de Los Mayos, Estero de los Mayos)
- Canal San Francisco • 33.56831°S 70.62982°W • 3872226 • DTCH
- Estero Las Monjas • 33.5689°S 70.34626°W • 3884146 • STM • (Estero Las Monjas, Estero las Monjas)
- Canal Maurino • 33.58333°S 70.5°W • 3880295 • DTCH
- Canal de Los Italianos • 33.58333°S 71.15°W • 3881987 • DTCH
- Canal de Las Higueras • 33.58333°S 71.15°W • 3884324 • DTCH
- Canal de La Esperanza • 33.58333°S 70.91667°W • 3885998 • DTCH
- Estero Frío • 33.58333°S 70.9°W • 3889291 • STM
- Estero del Manzano • 33.58444°S 70.4127°W • 3880612 • STM • (Estero El Manzano, Estero del Manzano)
- Canal San Bernardo • 33.60006°S 70.69221°W • 3872346 • DTCH
- Canal de Las Perdices • 33.60456°S 70.53398°W • 3884037 • DTCH
- Canal de La Luz • 33.606°S 70.51491°W • 3885426 • DTCH
- Estero Guayacán • 33.60692°S 70.35326°W • 3888313 • STM
- Estero La Paloma • 33.61364°S 70.11502°W • 3885120 • STM • (Estero La Paloma, Estero de la Paloma)
- Canal San José • 33.61667°S 71.25°W • 3872099 • DTCH
- Canal de Mallarauco • 33.61667°S 71.11667°W • 3880850 • DTCH
- Canal Los Bajos • 33.61667°S 70.65°W • 3882372 • DTCH
- Estero de La Marquesa • 33.6194°S 71.41194°W • 3885379 • STM • (Estero Marquesa, Estero de La Marquesa)
- Estero Peralillo • 33.62293°S 71.28034°W • 3876551 • STM
- Estero Yeguas Muertas • 33.62756°S 69.9207°W • 3867708 • STM
- Río del Plomo • 33.63305°S 69.95323°W • 3875612 • STM
- Canal Picano • 33.63333°S 71.21667°W • 3876337 • DTCH
- Estero de La Crianza • 33.63333°S 71.31667°W • 3886185 • STM
- Canal San Bernardo • 33.6°S 70.56667°W • 3872347 • DTCH
- Estero Agua Fría • 33.6°S 70.91667°W • 3900482 • STM
- Estero de Las Quinguas • 33.64176°S 70.26347°W • 3883969 • STM
- Estero del Medio • 33.64228°S 70.26338°W • 3880195 • STM
- Estero El Coironal • 33.64317°S 70.26415°W • 3891573 • STM
- Río Clarillo • 33.64503°S 70.63321°W • 3894580 • STM • (Estero El Clarillo, Rio Clarillo, Río Clarillo)
- Canal de Espejo • 33.64671°S 70.65477°W • 3889866 • DTCH
- Canal Puangue • 33.65°S 71.35°W • 3875118 • DTCH
- Canal Larraín • 33.65°S 70.93333°W • 3884691 • DTCH
- Canal de Agua Clara • 33.65°S 70.91667°W • 3900564 • DTCH
- Estero de San José • 33.65647°S 70.35481°W • 3872090 • STM
- Canal Trebulco • 33.66667°S 70.93333°W • 3869259 • DTCH
- Canal del Paico • 33.66667°S 71.11667°W • 3877776 • DTCH
- Canal de La Calera • 33.66667°S 70.86667°W • 3886403 • DTCH
- Canal El Rosario • 33.66667°S 71.03333°W • 3890474 • DTCH
- Canal El Marco • 33.66667°S 71.2°W • 3891058 • DTCH
- Estero del Sauce • 33.67473°S 70.34958°W • 3871201 • STM
- Estero Los Olguines • 33.68333°S 70.35°W • 3881674 • STM
- Canal Larraín • 33.68333°S 70.88333°W • 3884690 • DTCH
- Estero El Tollo • 33.68333°S 70.35°W • 3890284 • STM
- Canal Castillo • 33.68333°S 70.88333°W • 3896251 • DTCH
- Estero Melocotón • 33.69225°S 70.33666°W • 3880089 • STM
- Estero La Calchona • 33.70677°S 70.33469°W • 3886414 • STM
- Canal de Santa Rita • 33.70822°S 70.70135°W • 3871439 • DTCH
- Canal Talagante • 33.71667°S 70.96667°W • 3870305 • DTCH
- Estero El Bajo • 33.71667°S 71.23333°W • 3891917 • STM
- Canal Aguirrano • 33.71667°S 71°W • 3900371 • DTCH
- Estero El Gato • 33.71727°S 70.92724°W • 3891321 • STMA
- Estero Rincón Los Bueyes • 33.72633°S 70.47115°W • 3873175 • STMI
- Canal Pabellones • 33.73333°S 71.18333°W • 3877861 • DTCH
- Canal Chocalán • 33.73333°S 71.2°W • 3894909 • DTCH
- Estero San Alfonso • 33.73404°S 70.3007°W • 3872446 • STM
- Estero Las Ánimas • 33.73452°S 70.31896°W • 3884640 • STMI • (El Pangal, Estero Las Animas, Estero Las Ánimas)
- Estero de Coyanco • 33.73549°S 70.36913°W • 3893321 • STM
- Canal La Sirena • 33.7°S 70.63333°W • 3884296 • DTCH
- Estero Caldera • 33.74219°S 70.29346°W • 3897320 • STM
- Estero de Chocalán • 33.75°S 71.25°W • 3894908 • STM • (Estero Acule, Estero Chocalar, Estero Chocalár, Estero de Chocalan, Estero de Chocalán) • (CL)
- Canal Carmelito • 33.75°S 71.15°W • 3896623 • DTCH
- Estero San Nicolás • 33.75892°S 70.16904°W • 3871870 • STM
- Estero de Cuncumén • 33.76948°S 71.48512°W • 3892972 • STM
- Estero San Gabriel • 33.78003°S 70.24999°W • 3872199 • STM
- Estero El Cajón • 33.78333°S 71.08333°W • 3891799 • STMI
- Estero Manzanito • 33.78509°S 70.23246°W • 3880629 • STM
- Estero de Quincanque • 33.78606°S 71.46956°W • 3874048 • STM
- Estero Popeta • 33.78816°S 71.39316°W • 3875448 • STM
- Estero Puro • 33.78959°S 71.4336°W • 3874580 • STM
- Estero el Sauce • 33.8108°S 71.42283°W • 3871199 • STM
- Estero Salto de Agua • 33.81755°S 70.14916°W • 3872499 • STM
- Estero del Agua • 33.82653°S 70.05478°W • 3900622 • STM
- Estero de Paine • 33.83014°S 70.82084°W • 3877736 • STM
- Estero del Loro • 33.85°S 70.23333°W • 3882477 • STMI
- Estero Colina • 33.85571°S 69.98397°W • 3894238 • STM • (Estero Colina, Rio de Colina, Río de Colina)
- Estero La Monja • 33.87771°S 71.25825°W • 3885302 • STMI
- Estero Los Guindos • 33.87805°S 71.257°W • 3882026 • STM
- Estero Las Ramadillas • 33.8797°S 70.88227°W • 3883954 • STM
- Estero Caletón • 33.88333°S 70.2°W • 3897288 • STMI
- Estero del Cobre • 33.88547°S 70.19839°W • 3894517 • STM
- Estero Lingo Lingo • 33.91261°S 71.457°W • 3883136 • STM
- Estero del Prado • 33.91307°S 71.49097°W • 3875214 • STM
- Estero San Pedro • 33.91316°S 71.4579°W • 3871809 • STM
- Estero Loica • 33.91598°S 71.51573°W • 3882678 • STMI
- Estero Piuquencillo • 33.91693°S 70.19829°W • 3875733 • STM
- Río Claro • 33.92058°S 70.19819°W • 3894573 • STM
- Estero Licancheo • 33.92346°S 71.83162°W • 3883264 • STMI
- Estero de las Diucas • 33.92973°S 71.4453°W • 3892385 • STM
- Estero del Peuco • 33.94504°S 70.7153°W • 3876394 • STM • (Estero Peuco, Estero de Peuco, Estero del Peuco, Rio Peuco, Río Peuco)
- Estero Ñilhue • 33.9557°S 71.51814°W • 3878642 • STMI • (Estero Nihue, Estero Nilhue, Estero Ñihue, Estero Ñilhue)
- Estero Yesillo • 33.96034°S 70.15768°W • 3867654 • STM
- Estero de Corneche • 33.96746°S 71.69994°W • 3893549 • STM
- Estero Las Chacarillas • 33.96836°S 70.15185°W • 3884489 • STMI
- Estero del Diablo • 33.9867°S 70.14549°W • 3892523 • STM
- Estero Quiñicabén • 34.01888°S 71.72223°W • 3874018 • STM
- Estero de Piche • 34.02659°S 71.09609°W • 3876314 • STM
- Estero El Membrillo • 34.03533°S 70.95874°W • 3891033 • STM • (Estero El Membrillo, Estero del Membrillo)
- Estero del Huillín • 34.04621°S 71.21315°W • 3887540 • STM
- Estero Las Palmas • 34.06477°S 71.57314°W • 3884084 • STM • (Estero Las Palmas, Estero Palmas)
- Río Blanco • 34.08935°S 70.08544°W • 3898214 • STM
- Río Negro • 34.093°S 70.05386°W • 3878786 • STM
- Río Barroso • 34.09479°S 70.06578°W • 3898642 • STM
- Río Arhuelles • 34.16866°S 69.97086°W • 3899364 • STM
- Río Alvarado • 34.17177°S 69.94745°W • 3899859 • STM
- Río Cruz de Piedra • 34.1724°S 69.95615°W • 3893228 • STM

== See also ==
- List of lakes in Chile
- List of volcanoes in Chile
- List of islands of Chile
- List of fjords, channels, sounds and straits of Chile
- List of lighthouses in Chile
