= Farellones =

Village and ski resort in Lo Barnechea, Chile

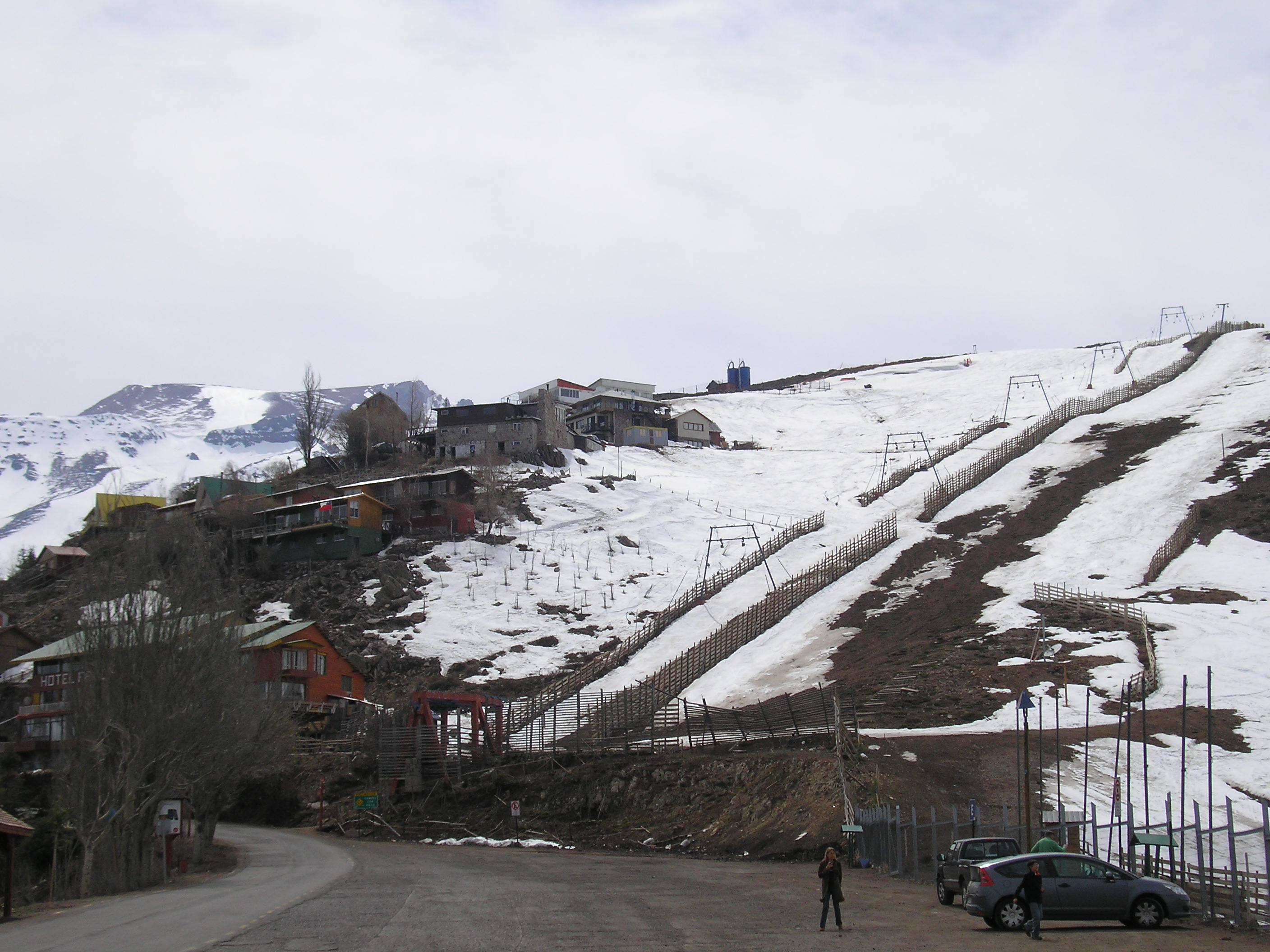
- Ski lifts connect Farellones Village and El Colorado ski resort
- Interactive map of Farellones
- Location: Lo Barnechea, Chile
- Nearest city: Santiago, Chile
- Coordinates: 33°21′3″S 70°18′50″W
- Top elevation: 3,333 m (10,935 ft)
- Base elevation: 2,430 m (7,970 ft)
- Skiable area: 13.3 km^{2} (5.1 sq mi)
- Trails: 22
- Lift system: gondola lift chairlifts 5 ski lifts

Farellones is a village and ski resort located 36 km northeast of Santiago, Chile. It was founded during the 1930s, nestled in a small valley in the Andes mountains close to other ski areas such as Valle Nevado, La Parva, and El Colorado.

== Location ==
Located in the commune of Lo Barnechea, 36 km from Santiago at an altitude of 2,340 meters above sea level (7,874 feet), Farellones has a health centre, a school, and about 200 houses. The houses and cabins are made of wood, giving the village its characteristic look.

== Ski resort ==
Skiers began visiting the Farellones area in the 1930s and in 1937, landowner Von Kiesling decided to sell the land off as plots to form a village. Not long after this, Antonio Padrós opened one of Farellones’ first hotels, the Posada de Farellones.

Farellones currently has only a few ski runs but its cable car system provides access to El Colorado, located only five kilometres up the hill of the same name. They are often considered as one joint ski area with a total of 62 runs including 11 for beginners, 6 for intermediates, 33 for advanced skiers, and 12 for experts. They have a maximum altitude of 3,333 meters above sea level, a vertical descent of 906 metres, and an average of 5 meters of snowfall in an average year. They are popular with beginners and families.

== History of skiing in Farellones ==
Skiing began in Farellones in the early 1930s, when ski gear came to Chile for the first time from Switzerland and Norway, consisting of wooden skis, leather boots coated in colourless grease to keep out the wet, with basic and dangerous bindings that remained fixed to the feet even during a fall.

The village grew up around the new sport and in 1937, the Hotel Posada de Farellones was constructed. Some years later the hotel received a royal visit from the English Duchess of Kent and served a formal luncheon. The first ski lift was built in the 1950s in La Gran Bajada (the great descent) in the area that would become later El Colorado, where the boldest skiers could leap over the roof of the Hotel Posada de Farellones at the end of the run.

The developments continued up the mountain with La Parva and finally Valle Nevado.

== Archaeology ==
Long time before the birth of Farellones village, the place was visited by arrieros (wranglers) with their livestock and adventurers searching for old Inca treasure, as it was common to find Pucarás (fortifications) and other remains of Inca settlements.

On February 1, 1954, the arrieros Luis Ríos Barrueto, Guillermo Chacón Carrasco, and Jaime Ríos Abarca found the Plomo Mummy (also known as the Boy of El Plomo or La Momia del Cerro El Plomo in Spanish) on Cerro El Plomo. The mummy is a well preserved Inca girl and was the first discovery of a frozen, high-altitude human sacrifice made by the Incas.

=== Casa de Piedra ===
At one side of the road to Valle Nevado is the Casa de Piedra de Farellones (Farellones Stone House), a stone structure that is believed to have been built by the Aconcagua people (late neolithic). It is thought to have been used as a temporary refuge in expeditions to gather the special kind of stone needed for making tools hunting Guanacos.

=== Inca roads ===
Corral Quemado, 28.75 km east of Santiago and 14.5 miles from Lo Barnechea, formed part of the Inca road system. It was the road from the copper mines, today known as "Disputada de las Condes", to the Mapocho River. The Inca road system was the spine of the Inca state, essential to administrate and control their vast territory.

The Spanish chronicles say that the Inca Road ran from the other side of the Andes, in Cuyo Province, Argentina, through Chilean valleys of Huechuraba and Colina and continued to the valley of what is now Santiago.

== The hotel ==
The Hotel Posada de Farellones is made from a mix of wood and stone in the Swiss style and was built in the late 1930s by Antonio Padrós. Its location allowed easy access to the three main ski resorts in Chile, which together form the biggest ski area of South America and the southern hemisphere: La Parva, El Colorado-Farellones and Valle Nevado.

== Access ==
There is only one road giving access to the village through the winding canyons of the Mapocho River, Molina River and Estero Yerba Loca river. From Corral Quemado onwards, the road has more than 40 hairpin turns and requires a vehicle equipped with snow chains in snowy conditions. The road only permits ascent between the hours of 8:30 and 13:30 and descent from 15:30 to 20:00 during peak ski season days.

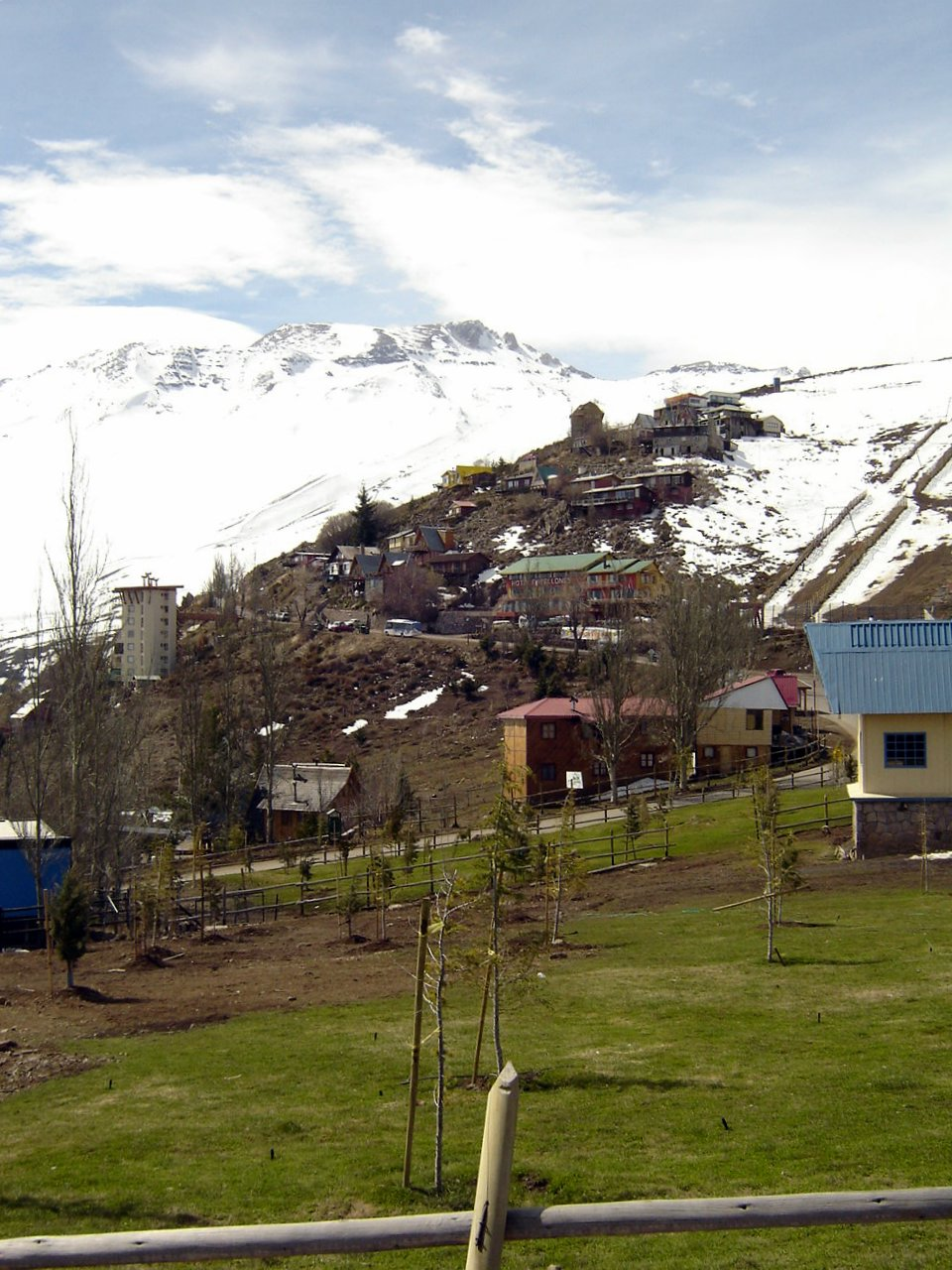
Farellones

=== New road ===
A new road was scheduled to be built in 2014. The road would run for 29 kilometers from Las Condes Avenue in Santiago, and would also see the construction of new real estate and a cable cart from Yerba Loca Nature Sanctuary to Farellones village.

== Yerba Loca Nature Sanctuary ==
Yerba Loca Nature Sanctuary (Spanish: "Santuario Natural Yerba Loca") is a protected area that extends from the top of La Paloma Hill (Spanish: "Cerro La Paloma") to the top of Cerro El Plomo, dividing the valleys of the Blanco River and Olivares River.

The area contains temperate coniferous forest, picnic and camping facilities, and the starting point for five trails, one of which ends at the hanging glaciers of Cerro La Paloma and Cerro El Altar.

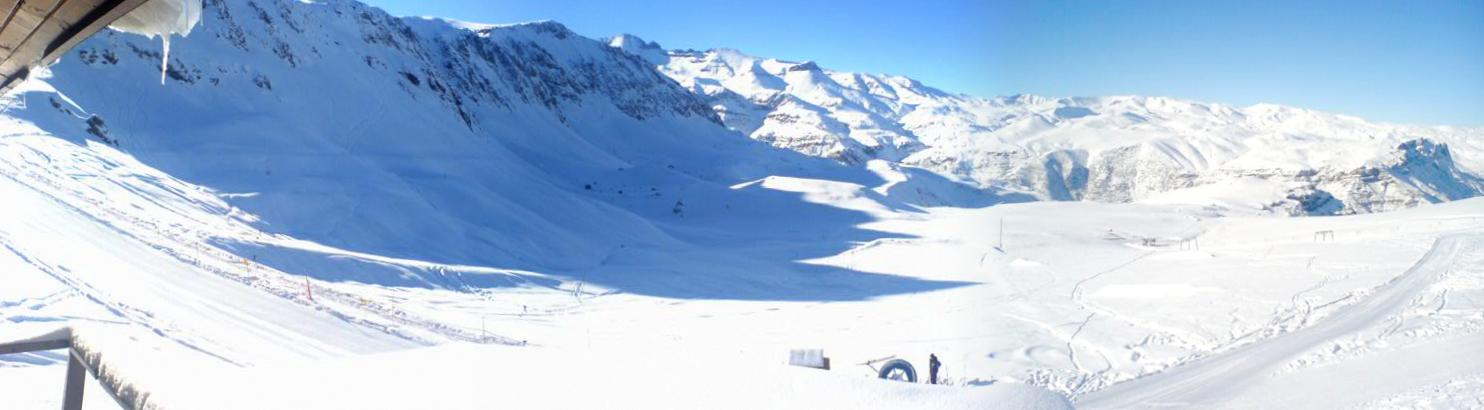
Panoramic view of Farellones ski runs

== Incident ==
On July 14, 2016, Matilda Rapaport, a Swedish professional extreme skier, was buried in an avalanche. She died on July 18, 2016, in a hospital in Santiago after suffering oxygen deprivation and brain damage.

== See also ==
- Cerro El Plomo
- La Parva
- Valle Nevado
- El Colorado
- Yerba Loca Nature Sanctuary
- Plomo Mummy
- Protected areas of Chile
