= Costa del Sol Airport =

Airport in Chile

- IATA: none; ICAO: SCSO

Summary
- Airport type: Private
- Serves: Rapel Lake, Chile
- Elevation AMSL: 490 ft / 149 m
- Coordinates: 34°07′15″S 71°31′40″W

Map
- Location of Costa del Sol Airport in Chile

Runways
Direction	Length		Surface
Direction	m	ft	Surface
14/32	741	2,430	Grass
- Source: Landings.com Google Maps GCM

Costa del Sol Airport (Spanish: Aeropuerto Costa del Sol), (ICAO: SCSO) is an airport serving communities on the west shore of Rapel Lake in the O'Higgins Region of Chile. The airport is 10 kilometres (6.2 mi) upstream of the Rapel Dam.

There is rising terrain north through east. The southeast end of the runway is 140 metres (460 ft) from the water, which is 40 metres (130 ft) lower.

== See also ==
- Transport in Chile
- List of airports in Chile
