= Rapel La Estrella Airport =

La Estrella Airport
- IATA: none; ICAO: SCRL

Summary
- Airport type: Private
- Serves: Rapel Lake, Chile
- Elevation AMSL: 397 ft / 121 m
- Coordinates: 34°11′55″S 71°28′52″W

Map
- Location of La Estrella Airport in Chile

Runways
Direction	Length		Surface
Direction	m	ft	Surface
17/35	600	1,969	Grass
- Source: Landings.com Google Maps GCM

La Estrella Airport (Spanish: Aeropuerto La Estrella), (ICAO: SCRL) is an airport on the southern arm of Rapel Lake, in the O'Higgins Region of Chile. The airport is 20 kilometres (12 mi) upstream from the Rapel Dam.

== See also ==
- Transport in Chile
- List of airports in Chile
