= Rapelhuapi Airport =

- IATA: none; ICAO: SCRP

Summary
- Airport type: Private
- Serves: Rapel Lake, Chile
- Elevation AMSL: 568 ft / 173 m
- Coordinates: 34°06′23″S 71°30′45″W

Map
- Location of Rapelhuapi Airport in Chile

Runways
| Direction | Length | | Surface |
| Direction | m | ft | Surface |
|---|---|---|---|
| 16/34 | 915 | 3,002 | Grass |
- Source: Landings.com Google Maps GCM

Rapelhuapi Airport (ICAO: SCRP) is an airport on the north shore of Rapel Lake, in the O'Higgins Region of Chile.

The runway is 10 kilometres (6.2 mi) upstream from the Rapel Dam. There is rising terrain from north through east.

== See also ==
- Transport in Chile
- List of airports in Chile
