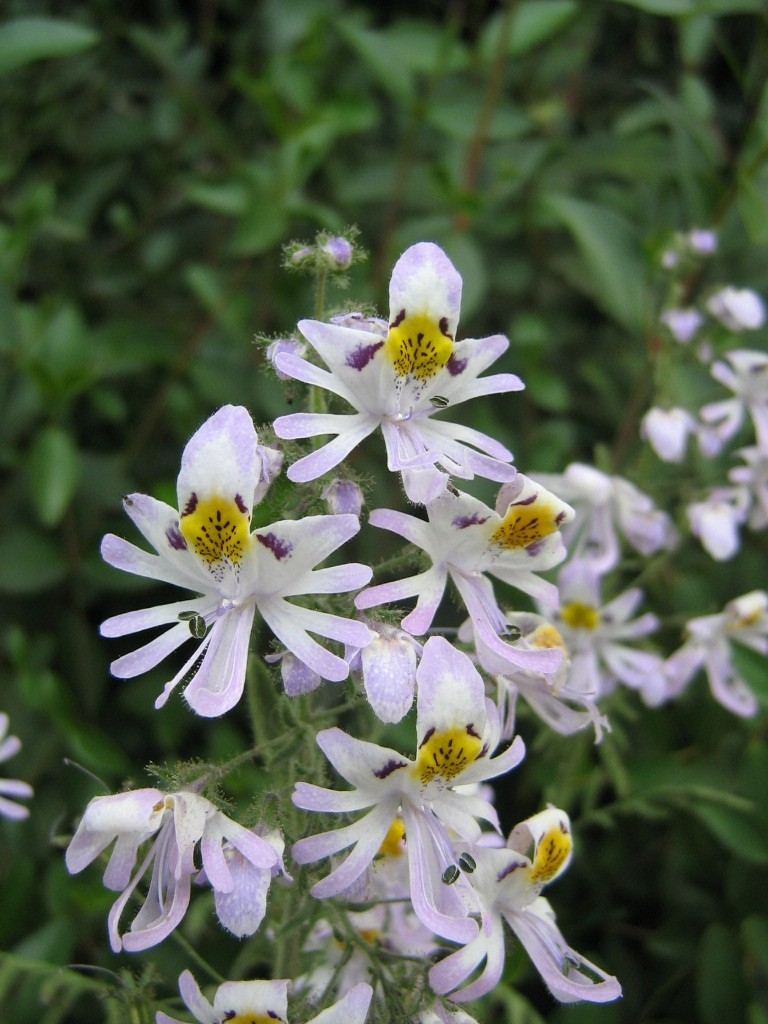
- Schizanthus pinnatus

Scientific classification
- Kingdom: Plantae
- Clade: Tracheophytes
- Clade: Angiosperms
- Clade: Eudicots
- Clade: Asterids
- Order: Solanales
- Family: Solanaceae
- Subfamily: Schizanthoideae
- Genus: Schizanthus; Ruiz & Pav.

Species
- See text

= Schizanthus =

Genus of flowering plants

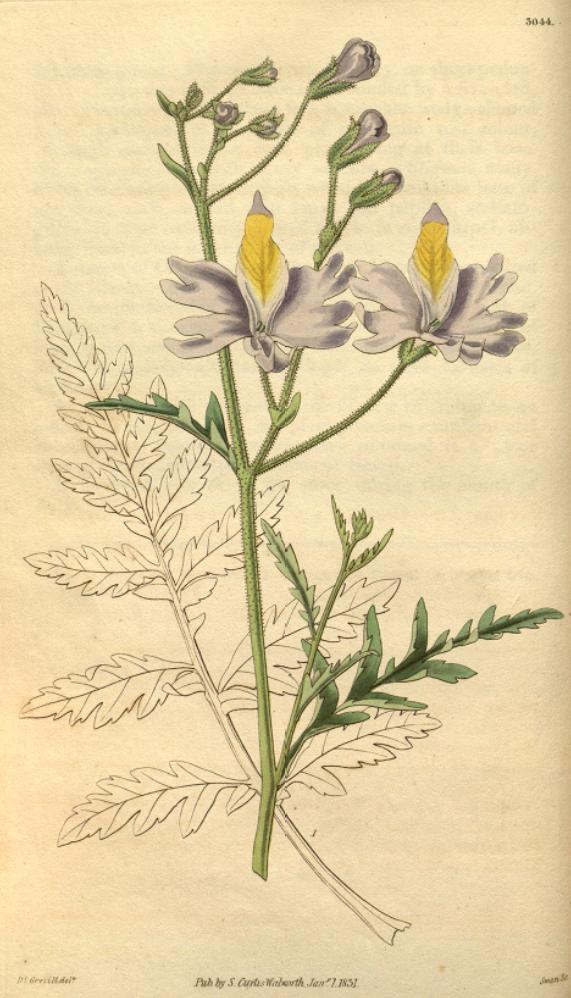
Illustration of Schizanthus grahamii from Curtis’s Botanical Magazine

Schizanthus /ˌskɪˈzænθəs/, also called butterfly flower, fringeflower, poor-man's-orchid, is a genus of plants in the nightshade family, Solanaceae.

They are annual or biennial herbaceous plants, with attractive flowers and they belong to the subfamily Schizanthoideae of the Solanaceae. The genus includes species native to Chile and Argentina, many species are adventitious in other parts of the world such as New Zealand and the United States.

== Description ==
Annual or biennial, glandulous-pubescent herbaceous plants, with alternate, pinnatilobate or bipinnatisect leaves and attractive flowers, arranged at the end of stems. The flowers are zygomorphic and hermaphrodite. The calyx has 5 parts, with linear or spatulate segments. The corolla is bilabiate; the superior labia is tripartite, with the central lobe complete and notched and the two laterals bifid. The inferior labia is tripartite with the central lobe notched, almond-shaped and the laterals are complete. The androecium is formed of 4(5) didynamous stamens, the two or three inferior stamens are reduced to staminodes. The fruit is a pluriseminate boll, dehiscent by two bifid valves. The basic chromosome number is x=10.

== List of species and descriptions ==
=== List of species ===
Accepted species include:

- Schizanthus alpestris Poepp.
- Schizanthus candidus Lindl.
- Schizanthus carlomunozii V.Morales & Muñoz-Schick
- Schizanthus coccineus (Phil.) J.M.Watson
- Schizanthus grahamii Gillies
- Schizanthus hookerii Gillies ex Graham
- Schizanthus integrifolius Phil.
- Schizanthus lacteus Phil.
- Schizanthus laetus Phil.
- Schizanthus litoralis Phil.
- Schizanthus nutantiflorus J.Chinga & Lavandero
- Schizanthus parvulus Sudzuki
- Schizanthus pinnatus Ruiz & Pav.
- Schizanthus porrigens Graham ex Hook.
- Schizanthus splendens Sudzuki

=== Schizanthus litoralis Phil. ===
This is an annual plant that grows up to 40 to 60 cm in height, glandulous and sticky, with divided, irregularly parted leaves of 4 to 8 cm in length, the superior leaves are smaller and often whole. The flowers are divided into a number of segments, they are very colourful, shades of violet with yellow patches and a dark line at the divisions between the upper labia. The flowers are comprised on a short, compact, terminal inflorescence. The fruit is a boll that is shorter than the calyx. This and other species of the genus are cultivated in the United States and in Europe. It originates in Chile where is grows in the littoral zone of the provinces of Coquimbo and Aconcagua. It is called the "butterfly of the coast" ("mariposita de la costa"). The seeds do not germinate easily in artificial conditions as they need scarification or manual abrasion to obtain good results.

=== Schizanthus pinnatus Ruiz & Pavón ===
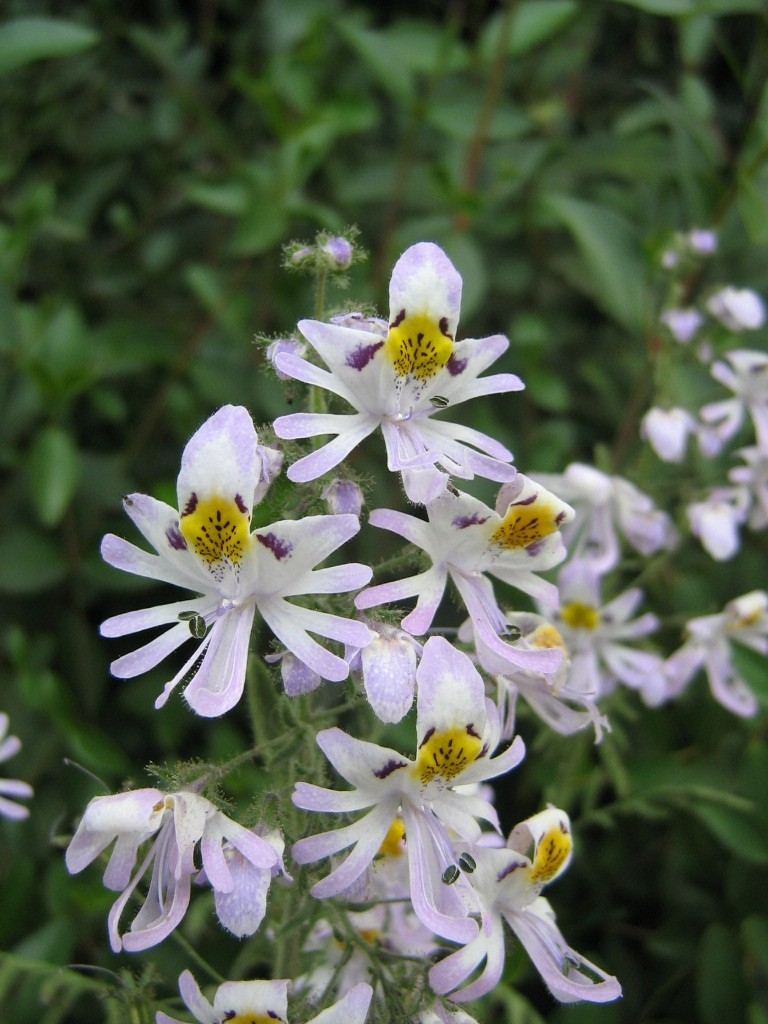
The attractive flowers of Schizanthus pinnatus

This is an annual plant of 20 to 50 cm in height, glandulous-pubescent, with pinnatisect leaves 2.5 to 3 cm in length, divided into 6 to 8 pairs in oblong-linear segments, entire or separated. The flowers are white, pink or violet, 2 to 3 cm in diameter, arranged in paniculate inflorescences, sometimes dichotomous. The fruit is a globular boll of approximately 5 mm length. It is native to Chile but the plants are also cultivated as ornamentals. It is commonly known as the "small butterfly" ("mariposita") or "small, white butterfly" ("mariposita blanca"). Some names that are considered synonymous to Schizanthus pinnatus are Schizanthus gayanus Phil.; S. gracilis Clos; S. heterophyllus Phil.; S. humilis Phil.; S. laciniosus Phil.; S. latifolius Phil.; S. lilacinus Kunze; S. tenuifolius Phil. y S. tenuis Phil.

=== Schizanthus grahamii Gill. ===
Known as Poor Man's Orchid, this plant grows to a height of 30 to 50 cm, glandulous-pubescent, with pinnatisect leaves up to 8 cm long. The flowers can be violet, pink, orange or white, with the tube approximately 1 cm long and the superior labia greater than 2 cm in length, being longer than the inferior one. The fruit is a 1 cm long ellipsoid boll. Native to Chile they are also cultivated as ornamentals. The plants flowers in summer.

=== Schizanthus × wisetonensis Low ===
This plant is an interspecific hybrid between Schizanthus pinnatus and S. grahamii, it grows to between 30 and 40 cm tall and has characteristics intermediate between both progenitors. In Spanish speaking countries it is known as the "butterfly plant" ("planta de la mariposa") and in English speaking countries as "poor man's orchid". The flowers are very attractive, they are white, blue, pink or rose coloured depending on the variety. The foliage is light green and looks like the fronds of a fern. It is grown as an ornamental in all the temperate regions of the world. It flowers in spring. Plants prefer mild, semi-shaded places as they do not tolerate excessive heat. Plants replicate through seeds that mature in the autumn. Germination takes approximately 10–14 days at 16-18 °C.

== Floral biology ==
Plants in the genus Schizanthus are entomophilous, that is, they require that their pollen is transported from plant to plant by insects. The majority of Schizanthus species are pollinated by hymenoptera (bees, bumblebees and wasps of the genera Alloscirtetica, Bombus, and Megachile, among others). However, the species with white flowers (S. candidus, S. integrifolius and S. lacteus) are pollinated by moths, and Schizanthus grahamii is pollinated by hummingbirds (such as, for example, Oreotrochilus leucopleurus).

Although the great majority of Solanaceae exhibit poricidal pollen dehiscence, the bee-pollinated species in this genus use explosive dehiscence which is triggered when an insect lands on a flower; this ensures that the insect is covered in pollen. This mechanism favours cross pollination (allogamy or xenogamy) in these plants.

== Alkaloids ==
Alkaloids are nitrogenous organic substances that are produced by plants as a secondary metabolite and which have an intense physiological action on animals even at low doses. Schizanthus contain a great diversity of alkaloids, among them:

- Pyrrolidines: such as for example, 1-methyl-2-(1-methyl-2-pyrrolidinyl)ethyl-6-deoxi3-O-[(Z)-2-methyl-2-butenoyl]-alpha-galactopyranoside found in Schizanthus integrifolius.

Structure of alpha tropanol.

- Tropanes. Various types of tropanes have been isolated from different species of the genus. Derivatives of hydroxytropane and angeloyloxytropane have been detected in Schizanthus alpestris, Schizanthus grahamii, Schizanthus. hookerii, Schizanthus litoralis and Schizanthus pinnatus.
- Schizantines. Esters of hydroxytropane have been detected in Schizanthus grahamii and derivatives of mesaconic acid and itaconic acid have been found in Schizanthus litoralis. The C, D and E schizantines have been found in Schizanthus grahamii as well has dimers of an ester of truxillic acid. Schizanthus pinnatus accumulates B and D schizantines, while Z schizantine has been detected in Schizanthus porrigens.

Other types of alkaloids isolated from different species of the genera are 3-alpha-tigloyloxytropane, hygroline and pseudohygroline. The wide variety of alkaloids found in these species have allowed their use in phylogenetic studies of the genus. The evolution of these secondary metabolites, apparently, occurred in parallel with morphological evolution. This is reflected in the simplest alkaloids, pyrrolidine derivatives, present in the genus's most primitive clade (Schizanthus integrifolius and other white flowered species), up to the dimeric and trimeric derivatives of tropanes, such as those found in Schizanthus grahamii (grahamine) or the tropanol diesters, the dimers of mesaconic and itaconic acids, present in Schizanthus hookerii and Schizanthus litoralis.

== Taxonomy ==
Schizanthus comprises 12 species of annuals and biennials, which make up the monospecific subfamily, Schizanthoideae. This subfamily is the most basal grouping in Solanaceae, and is therefore sister to all higher taxa of the family.

== Phylogeny ==
Schizanthus is a somewhat atypical genus among the solanaceas due to its strongly zygomorphic flowers and basic chromosome number. In fact, it is located in its own subfamily: Schizanthoideae. Morphological and molecular data suggest that Schizanthus diverged early from the rest of the solanaceas, probably in the late Cretaceous or in the early Cenozoic, 50 million years ago. At that time the southern regions of South America were experiencing tropical to subtropical conditions. The molecular data also suggests that Schizanthus is divided into 3 main lineages or clades. Clade A includes Schizanthus alpestris, positioned very close to an unresolved clade comprising S. candidus, S. integrifolius, and S. lacteus. Clade B contains S. hookeri and S. grahamii. Clade C contains S. laetus with two related sub-clades, one of which includes S. litoralis and S. porrigens, and the other S. tricolor, S. pinnatus, and S. parvulus. Despite the early origin of the genus, the molecular data suggests that the 3 main Schizanthus clades diverged recently, 5 million years ago, when the desert and semi-desert regions that the genus currently occupies were already arid. The great diversity of flower types within Schizanthus has been the product of the species’ adaptation to the different types of pollinator that exist in the Mediterranean, high alpine and desert ecosystems that were present in Chile and adjacent areas of Argentina.

== Cultivation ==
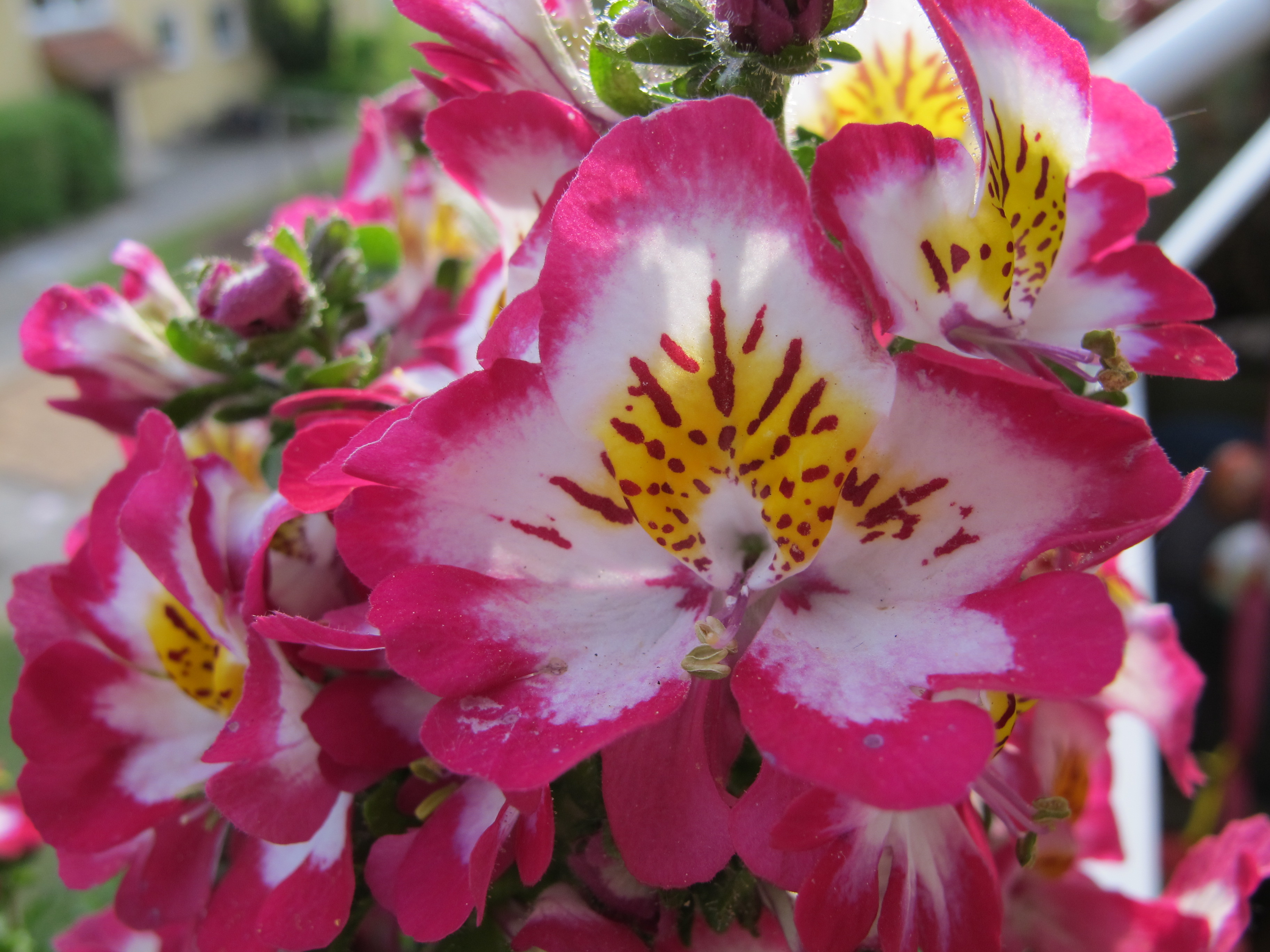
Schizanthus x wisentonesis used as ornamental plant on a balcony in Germany

Schizanthus species are cultivated in the horticulture trade and widely available as an ornamental plant for gardens.

The flowers of Schizanthus are available in a wide range of colors and sizes, and are delicately spotted and blotched like the smaller butterflies. The blooms on a well-grown plant are produced in such profusion as to completely cover it. For the garden the dwarfed varieties should be chosen as the tall sorts grow rather slender and crooked. The leaves are attractive with soft green, deeply cut and fern like that are often covered with fine hair.

This flower was used by Celia Sánchez in the Cuban Revolution to hide telegrams.

A number of species are cultivated as ornamentals throughout the world, but perhaps the most used is Schizanthus × wisetonensis. Some cultivars of this species are 'Angel Wings', 'Disco', 'Hit Parade', 'Treasure Trove™ Lilac', 'Treasure Trove™ Pure White', 'Treasure Trove™ Pure Scarlet Shades' (the latter have been patented in the United States).

== Conservation status ==
=== Population analysis ===
Research has been carried out on natural populations of Schizanthus pinnatus for the period 1960 to 2005. These studies have found that the natural population is decreasing year on year at a greater rate than the average for the dicot species studied.

=== Conservation measures ===
Three of the species in the genus (Schizanthus grahamii, Schizanthus hookeri and Schizanthus pinnatus) are found in the Yerba Loca Nature Sanctuary, a protected area in the Santiago Metropolitan Region in Chile. The vascular flora in this nature reserve is composed of 500 taxa which represents 34% of the Metropolitan Region’s native flora, 27% of that of the Valparaíso Region, and around 16-17 % of the Mediterranean flora of Zona Central, Chile.
