= Estero Chimbarongo =

Location
- Country: Chile

Physical characteristics
- Mouth: Tinguiririca River
  - coordinates: 34°32′53″S 71°22′25″W

The Estero Chimbarongo is a river of Chile.

== See also ==
- List of rivers of Chile
