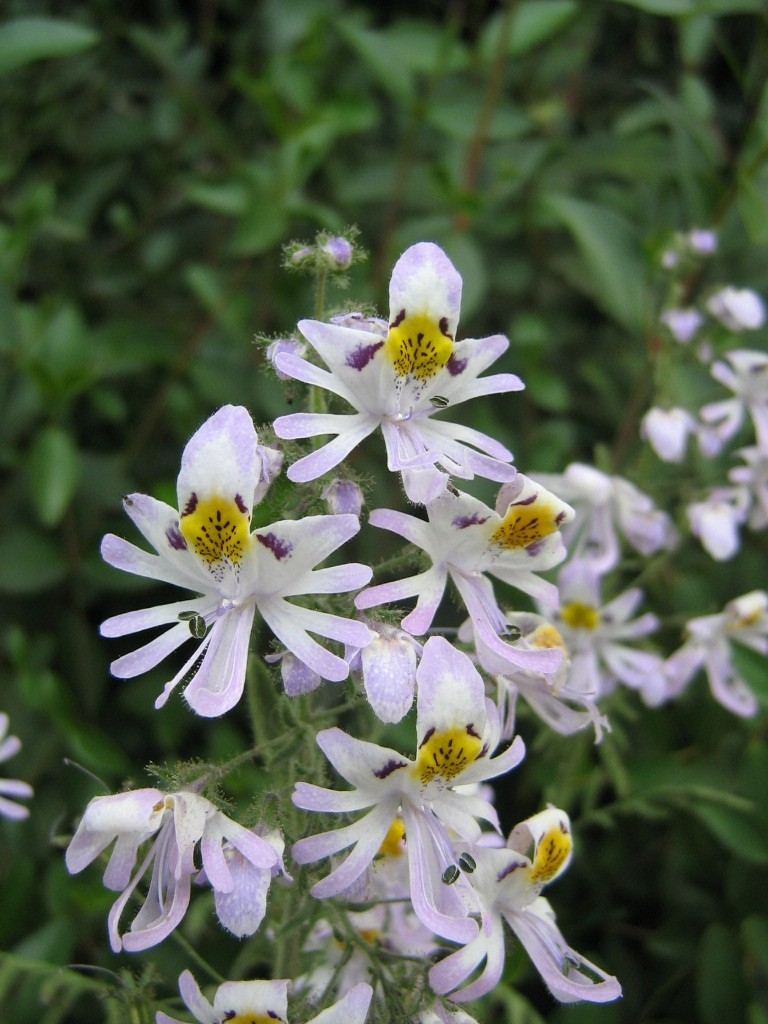
- The attractive flowers of Schizanthus pinnatus

Scientific classification
- Kingdom: Plantae
- Clade: Embryophytes
- Clade: Tracheophytes
- Clade: Spermatophytes
- Clade: Angiosperms
- Clade: Eudicots
- Clade: Asterids
- Order: Solanales
- Family: Solanaceae
- Genus: Schizanthus
- Species: S. pinnatus

Binomial name
- Schizanthus pinnatus Ruiz & Pav.

Synonyms
- List: Eutoca pedunculosa Phil.; Schizanthus duodecemfidus Stokes; Schizanthus evansianus Paxton; Schizanthus floribundus Phil.; Schizanthus gayanus Phil.; Schizanthus gracilis (Benth.) Clos; Schizanthus gracilis var. angustifolius Reiche; Schizanthus grandiflorus-albus Washburn; Schizanthus grandiflorus-oculatus Van Houtte ex T.Moore; Schizanthus humilis Phil.; Schizanthus latifolius Phil.; Schizanthus lilacinus Kunze; Schizanthus major Hoffmanns. ex Steud.; Schizanthus oculatus-atropurpureus Washburn; Schizanthus pinnatifidus Lindl.; Schizanthus pinnatus var. gracilis Benth.; Schizanthus pinnatus var. grandiflorus-oculatus (Van Houtte ex T.Moore) Groenland; Schizanthus pinnatus f. papilionaceus Voss; Schizanthus priestii Paxton; Schizanthus violaceus Paxton & Lindl.

= Schizanthus pinnatus =

Species of flowering plant

Schizanthus pinnatus, called butterfly flower or poor man's orchid, names it shares with other members of its genus, is a species of flowering plant in the nightshade family, Solanaceae. It is native to Chile and naturalized elsewhere. It has gained the Royal Horticultural Society's Award of Garden Merit as an ornamental.

== Description ==
It is an annual plant of 20 to 50 cm (8 to 20 in) in height, glandulous-pubescent, with pinnatisect leaves 2.5 to 3 cm in length, divided into 6 to 8 pairs in oblong-linear segments, entire or separated. The flowers are white, pink or violet, 2 to 3 cm in diameter, arranged in paniculate inflorescences, sometimes dichotomous. The fruit is a globular boll of approximately 5 mm length. It is commonly known as the "small butterfly" ("mariposita") or "small, white butterfly" ("mariposita blanca").
