= Claro de Rengo River =

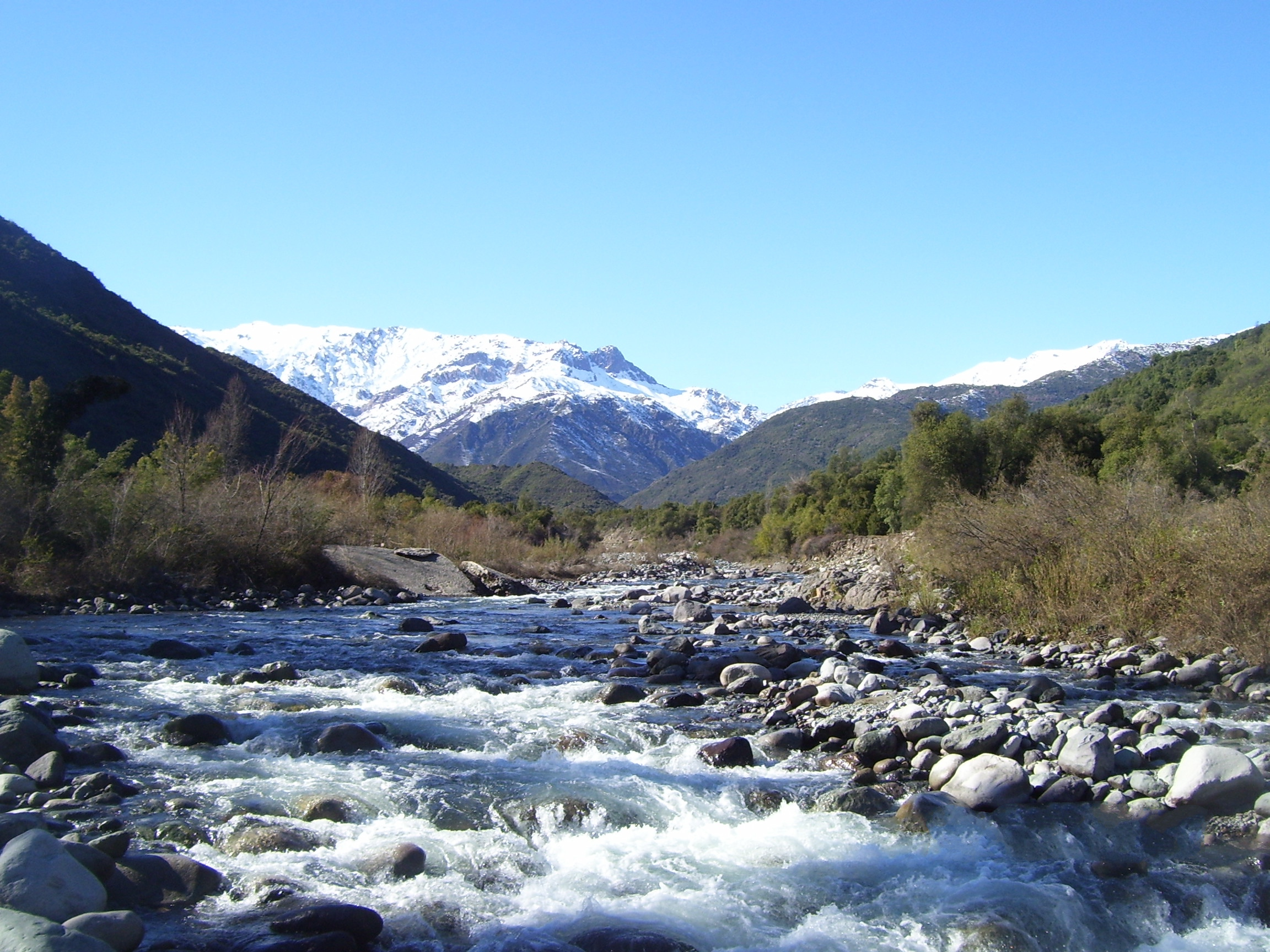

Location
- Country: Chile

Physical characteristics
- Mouth: Cachapoal River
  - coordinates: 34°24′03″S 71°07′49″W

The Claro de Rengo River is a river of Chile.

== See also ==
- List of rivers of Chile
