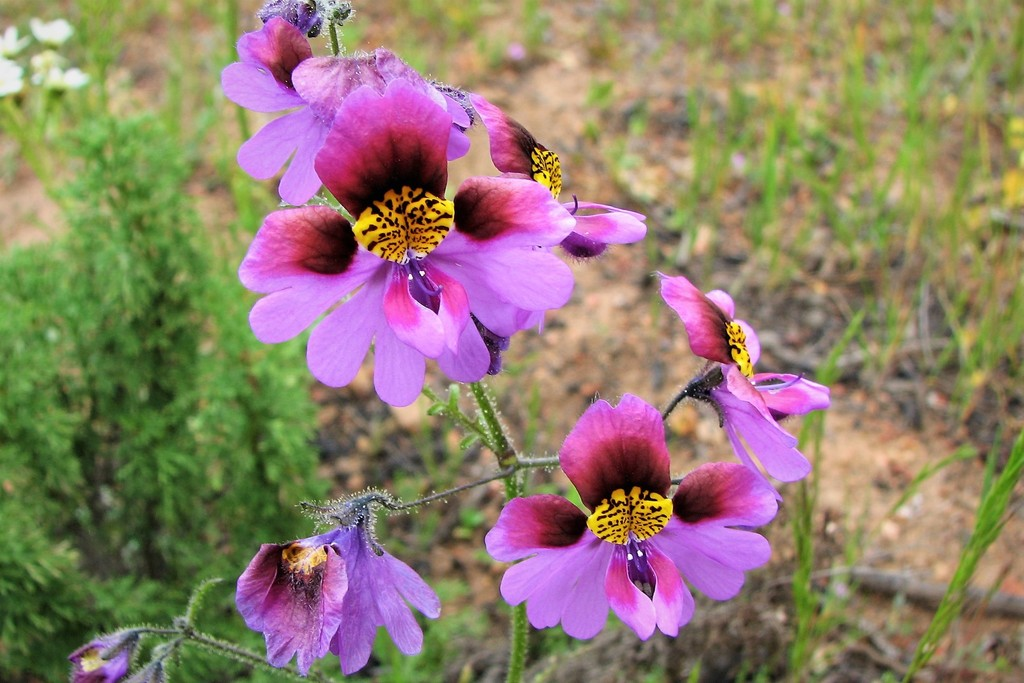
- Schizanthus carlomunozii var. dilutimaculatus

Scientific classification
- Kingdom: Plantae
- Clade: Embryophytes
- Clade: Tracheophytes
- Clade: Spermatophytes
- Clade: Angiosperms
- Clade: Eudicots
- Clade: Asterids
- Order: Solanales
- Family: Solanaceae
- Genus: Schizanthus
- Species: S. carlomunozii

Binomial name
- Schizanthus carlomunozii V.Morales & Muñoz-Schick

= Schizanthus carlomunozii =

Species of flowering plant

Schizanthus carlomunozii, is a species of plant in the genus Schizanthus in the Solanaceae, native to Chile. Like all other species in this genus, it carries its strongly mirror-symmetrical flowers in a panicle at the top of the stems, the calyx has a very short tube and the 5 linear to lance-shaped segments that are slightly unequal, the corolla shaped like a butterfly with an upper and lower lip, and 2 fertile anthers and 3 staminodes. It can be distinguished by its large flowers that have spots bordering the cleft between the central and side lobes of the upper lip.

== Description ==
Schizanthus carlomunozii is an annual herb that may have a woody base, with one or several stems from the same root, that is usually covered in sticky glandular hairs, and unicellular hairs without glands. The leaves are mostly bipinnatifid, with irregularly divided, opposite or alternate segments, that are perpendicular to the midrib. The inflorescences is terminal panicle. The peduncles of the lowest flowers are up to 30–40 mm (1.2–1.6 in) long. The flowers are 5-merous. The calyx is covered in rough glandular hairs. The merged tube of the calyx is very short and extends into 5 slightly unequal line-, spade- or lance-shaped segments. The corolla tube is up to 3 mm long, shorter than the calyx. The corolla is strongly mirror-symmetric and is reminiscent of a butterfly, 10–34 mm (0.39–1.34 in) long and 10–40 mm (0.39–1.57 in) wide. The upper lip is split in three lobes, the middle lobe inverted lance-shaped, with an entire margin and a rounded apex split with a small V-shaped cut, bi-lobed or multi-lobed. It has a yellow area that is dotted with maroon coloured spots, and is bordered distally with a dark claret-coloured zone. The side lobes are split and these segments can sometimes be divided two or more times themselves. The lateral lobes of the upper lip with the upper segments a little rounded downwards and wider than the lower segments. The middle lobe of the lower lip is 4–6 mm (0.16–0.24 in) wide and forms a keel, while the side lobes of the lower lip are line- or spade-shaped and arching inwards. The side lobes of the lower lip are line- to spade-shaped and longer than the middle lobe. The stamens almost reach the tip of the lower middle lobe. The capsule is hairless. The two fertile stamens are included in the keel and sometimes a much reduced staminode can be found between their base, while two distinctive staminodes are directed to the sides or the front. The anthers are connected to the filaments at their base, and release their pollen explosively when touched. The ovary is encircled at is base by a nectar producing gland. The style is thin like a thread and topped by an inconspicuous stigma that lacks papillae. The fruit capsule opens with 2 valves and contains up to 40 compressed, ellipsoidal or kidney-shaped seeds.

=== Differences between the varieties ===
The typical variety can reach a height of up to 45 cm (18 in). Its leaf blade is 6.5–9 cm (2.6–3.5 in) long, and 2–3.5 cm (0.79–1.38 in) wide. The inflorescence may be 15–28 cm (5.9–11.0 in) long. The highest peduncles are 4–8 mm (0.16–0.31 in) long. The sepal teeth are 5–8 mm (0.20–0.31 in) long and 1.5–3 mm (0.059–0.118 in) wide. The limbs of the petals are pale violet, sometimes whitish, mostly 20–28 mm (0.79–1.10 in) but sometimes up to 34 mm (1.3 in) long, mostly 18–30 mm (0.71–1.18 in) but exceptionally up to 40 mm (1.6 in) wide. The upper lip has sharply defined claret coloured spots on the margins of the middle lobe and in the upper part of the lateral lobes (in the separation of the lateral and middle lobes). The yellow area in the lower half of the middle lobe of the upper lip is sometimes surrounded by a white halo. This middle lobe is 10–18 mm (0.39–0.71 in) long and usually 7–9 mm (0.28–0.35 in), rarely up to 12 mm (0.47 in) wide. The middle lobe of the lower lip is 7–8 mm (0.28–0.31 in) long. The lateral lobes of the lower lip are usually 10–12 mm (0.39–0.47 in), sometimes up to 17 mm (0.67 in) long and 2 mm (0.079 in) rarely up to 4 mm (0.16 in) wide. The capsule is as long or somewhat longer than the calyx. Schizanthus carlomunozii var. dilutimaculatus may grow to 70 cm tall. The dimensions of the leaf blade are 4.5–7.5 cm or sometimes up to 13 cm long and 1.5–3.5 cm, seldomly up to 4 cm wide. The inflorescence may be 5–30 cm long. The highest peduncles are 4–14 mm long. The sepal teeth usually measure 5–9, rarely up to 12 mm long and 1–2 mm wide. The limbs are pink, lavender or lilac, sometimes whitish in colour, 20–28 mm long and 15–25 mm wide. The upper lip is adorned with three large black to claret coloured spots, which fade from the bottom to the top. One of these spots occupies the total width of the upper half of the middle lobe, while the others two can be found on the lateral lobes as a continuation of the centre spot. The middle lobe of the upper lip is 12–15 mm long and 7–9 mm wide, while the yellow area is never surrounded by a white halo. The middle lobe of the lower lip is 6–9 mm long, and the lateral lobes 10–12 mm long and 2 mm wide. The capsule is shorter or a little longer than the calyx.

== Taxonomy ==
This butterfly flower was first named by Vanezza Morales-Fierro and Mélica Muñoz-Schick in 2020, in honour of Carlos Muñoz Pizarro. This famous Chilean botanist had described and illustrated the species in his 1966 publication Flores silvestres de Chile, but he erroneously considered it to be Schizanthus litoralis. Differences in the staining of the upper lip prompted the recognition of two varieties. The typical variety Schizanthus carlomunozii var. carlomunozii has two sharply defined mostly burgundy coloured spots on the lateral margins of the middle lobe of the upper lip. Schizanthus carlomunozii var. dilutimaculatus has one large spot stretching the width of the middle lobe, continuing on the side lobes and fading at the upper margin.

== Distribution ==
Both varieties are endemic to Chile at 20–350 m (66–1,100 ft) above sea level. Schizanthus carlomunozii var. carlomunozii can be found along the coast of the provinces of Elqui and Limarí between 29°35' and 31°10' southern latitude. Schizanthus carlomunozii var. dilutimaculatus occurs from the province of Elqui to the province of Petorca, between 29°25' and 32°20' southern latitude.

== Habitat and protection ==
The typical variety grows close to the sea in the shade of shrubs, and along roadsides, on sandy slopes and in dry fields. Schizanthus carlomunozii var. dilutimaculatus grows in dunes and other sandy soils in the shade of shrubs, along disturbed roadsides, and on shady slopes. It can be found near Centaurea chilensis, Myrcianthes coquimbensis and Heliotropium stenophyllum. Both varieties occur in the Fray Jorge National Park.
