= Rapel River =

River in Chile

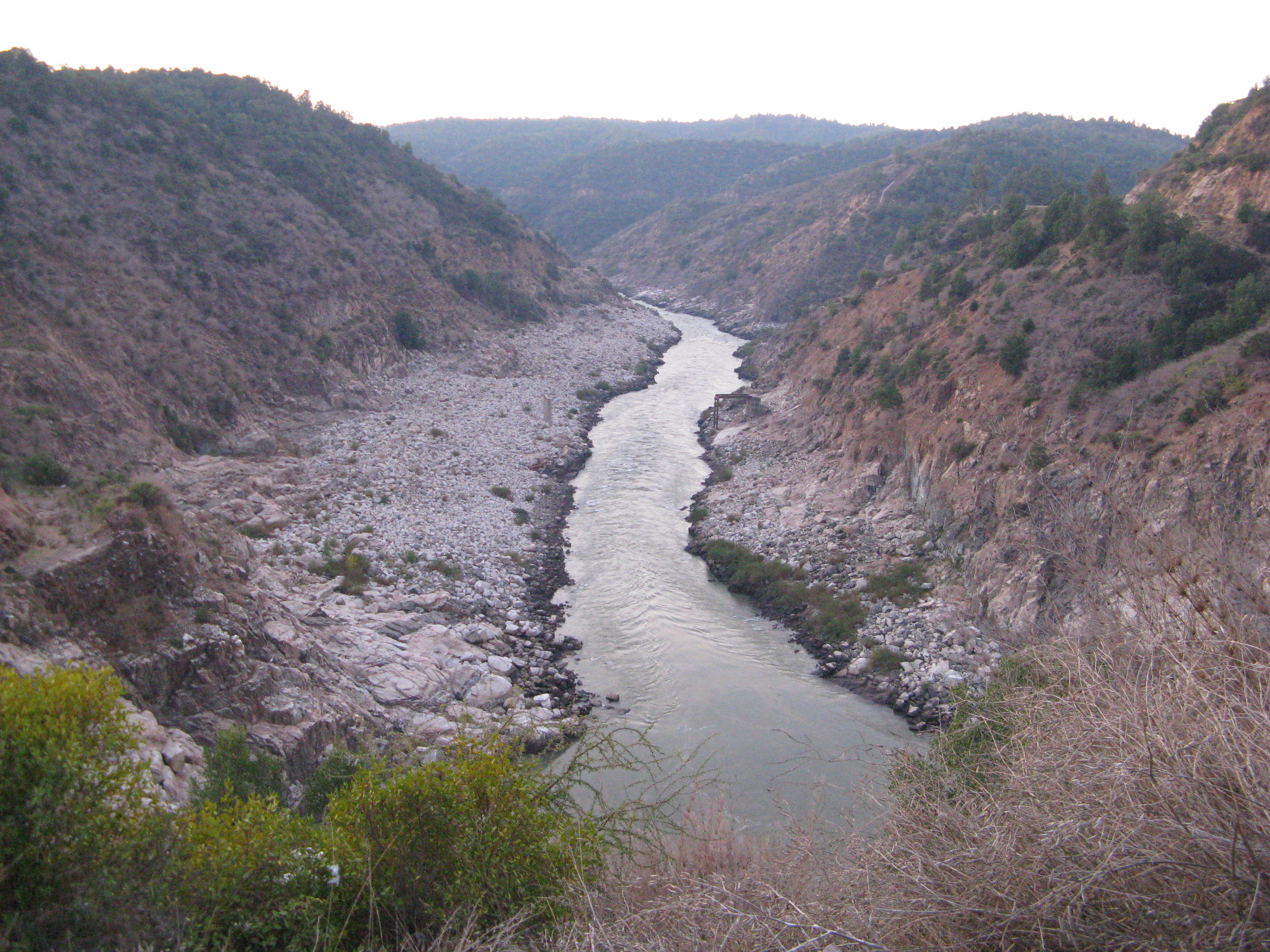
- The river just downstream of Rapel Dam

- Location of mouth

Location
- Country: Chile

Physical characteristics
- Mouth: Rio Grande
  - coordinates: 33°54′14″S 71°49′59″W
- Basin size: 13,695 km^{2} (5,288 sq mi)

Rapel River is a river of Chile located in the O'Higgins Region. It begins at the confluence of the rivers Cachapoal and Tinguiririca in an area best known as La Junta. At present day, this area is impounded by Rapel Dam, creating Rapel Lake.

Other tributaries:

- Estero Alhué
- Claro de Rengo River(Cachapoal)
- Claro River(Tinguiririca)
- Estero Zamorano
- Estero La Cadena
- Estero Carén
- Estero Coya
- Estero Chimbarongo
- Pangal River

== See also ==
- List of rivers of Chile
