= Cachapoal River =

Coordinates: 34°16′29″S 71°26′05″W

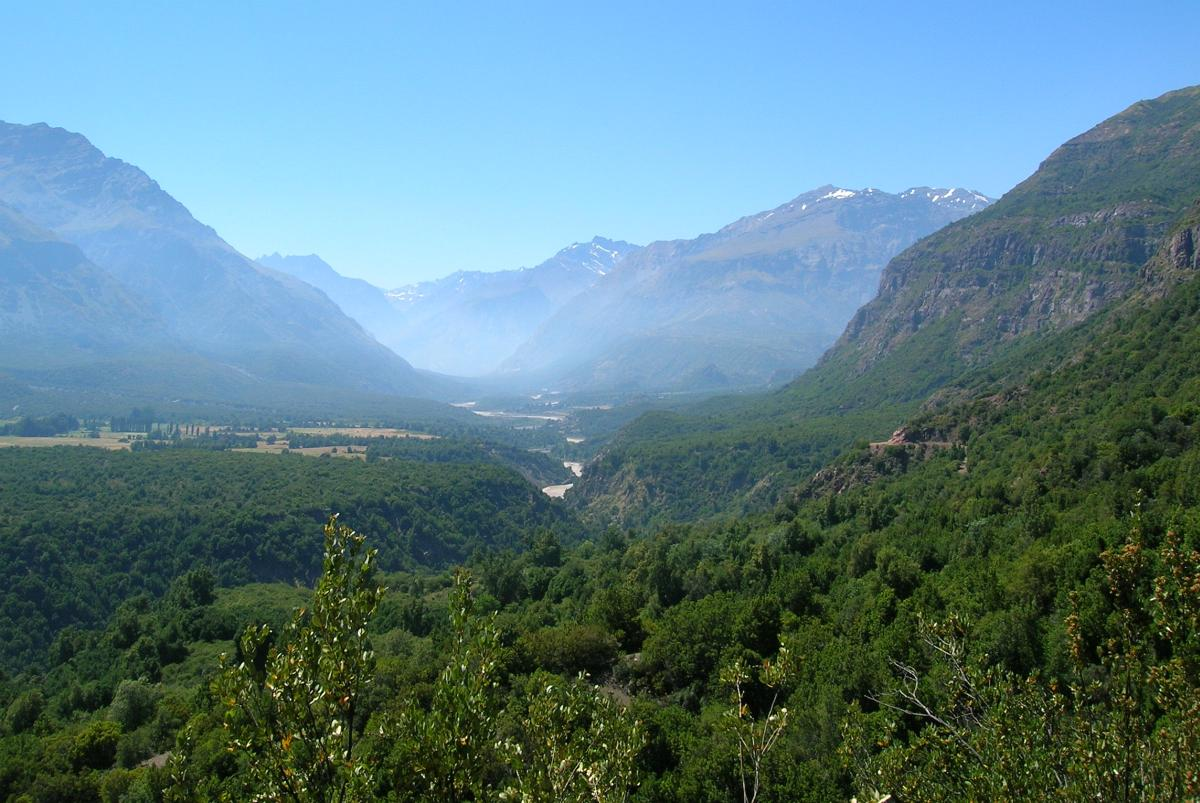

Location
- Country: Chile

Physical characteristics
- Mouth
  - location: Rapel Lake
- Length: 250 km (160 mi)
- Basin size: 6,370 km^{2} (2,460 sq mi)
- Discharge
  - average: 92.3 m^{3}/s (3,260 cu ft/s)

Cachapoal River is a tributary river of the Rapel River in Chile located in the Libertador General Bernardo O'Higgins Region. The river gives its name to the Cachapoal Province.

== Cachapoal Valley ==
The valley takes its name from the Cachapoal River that flows through Rapel Valley along with its tributaries, the Claro and Cortaderal rivers. All these watercourses flow into Rapel Lake.

Cachapoal River begun to incise in the rising Andes in the Miocene epoch. Later, as glaciers developed in the Andes the upper part of the valley was glaciated and reshaped into a glacial valley.

The climate of the valley is temperate and consistently Mediterranean, sheltered by the coastal range from the cooling influences of the Pacific Ocean.

=== Wine ===
The Rapel Valley produces predominantly red wines, including Carménère, Cabernet Sauvignon, and Merlot. The valley's diverse microclimates allow the growing of a wide array of grapes; these range from cold-climate varieties at higher altitudes near the Andes, to varieties which need warmer climates in the lower-lying areas surrounding Lake Rapel.

== Sources ==
- Cuenca del río Rapel
