= Estero Lampa =

Coordinates: 33°16′20″S 70°53′15″W

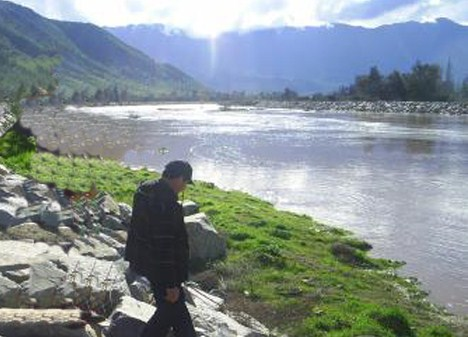

Location
- Country: Chile

The Estero Lampa is a river of Chile.

== See also ==
- List of rivers of Chile
