= Estero Chacabuco =

Coordinates: 33.1279°S 70.8641°W

Location
- Country: Chile

The Estero Chacabuco is a river of Chile.

== See also ==
- List of rivers of Chile
