= Estero Zamorano =

Coordinates: 34°25′S 71°11′W

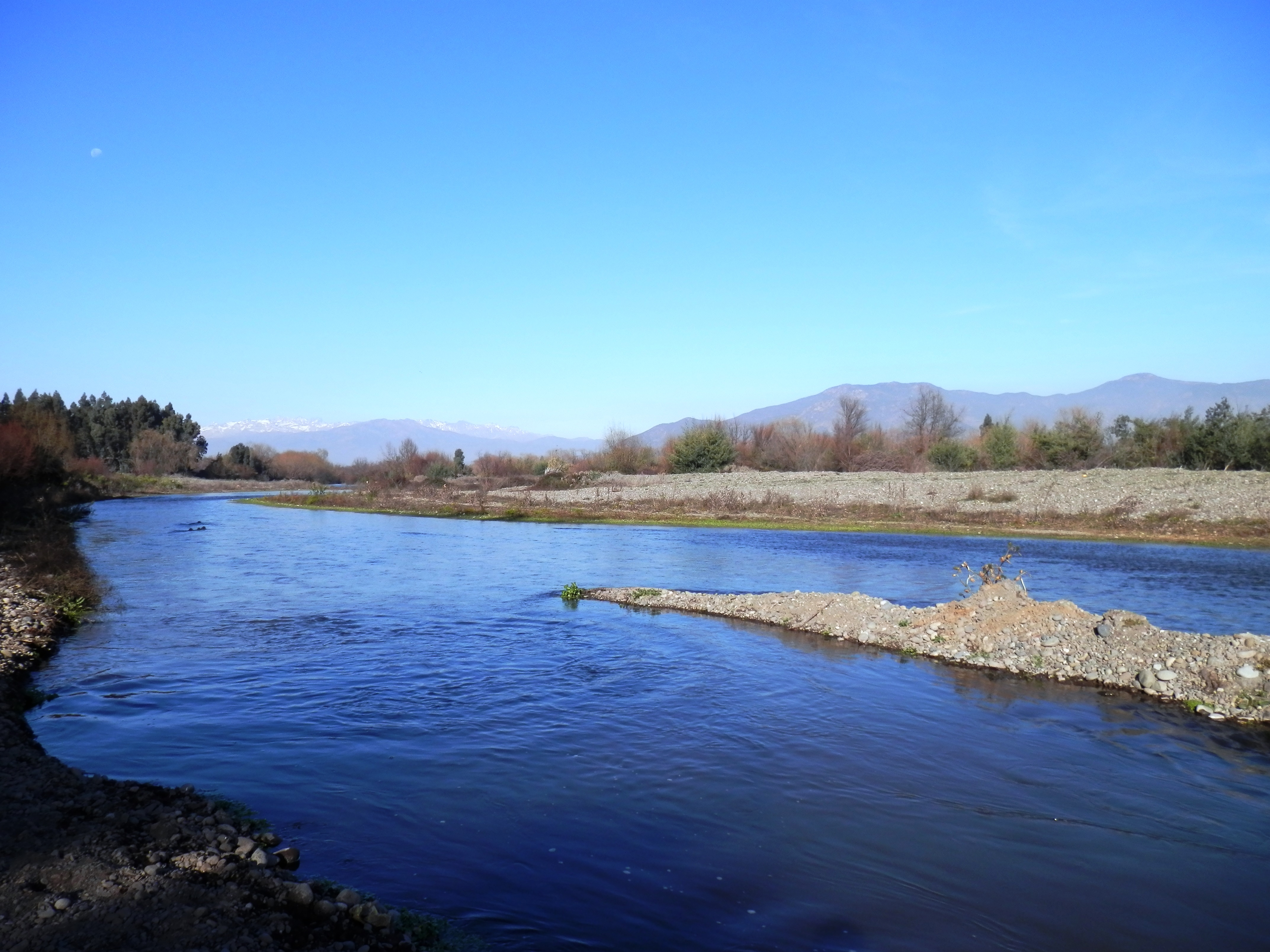

Location
- Country: Chile

The Estero Zamorano is a river of Chile.

== See also ==
- List of rivers of Chile
