= Claro River (Tinguiririca) =

River in the O'Higgins Region of Chile

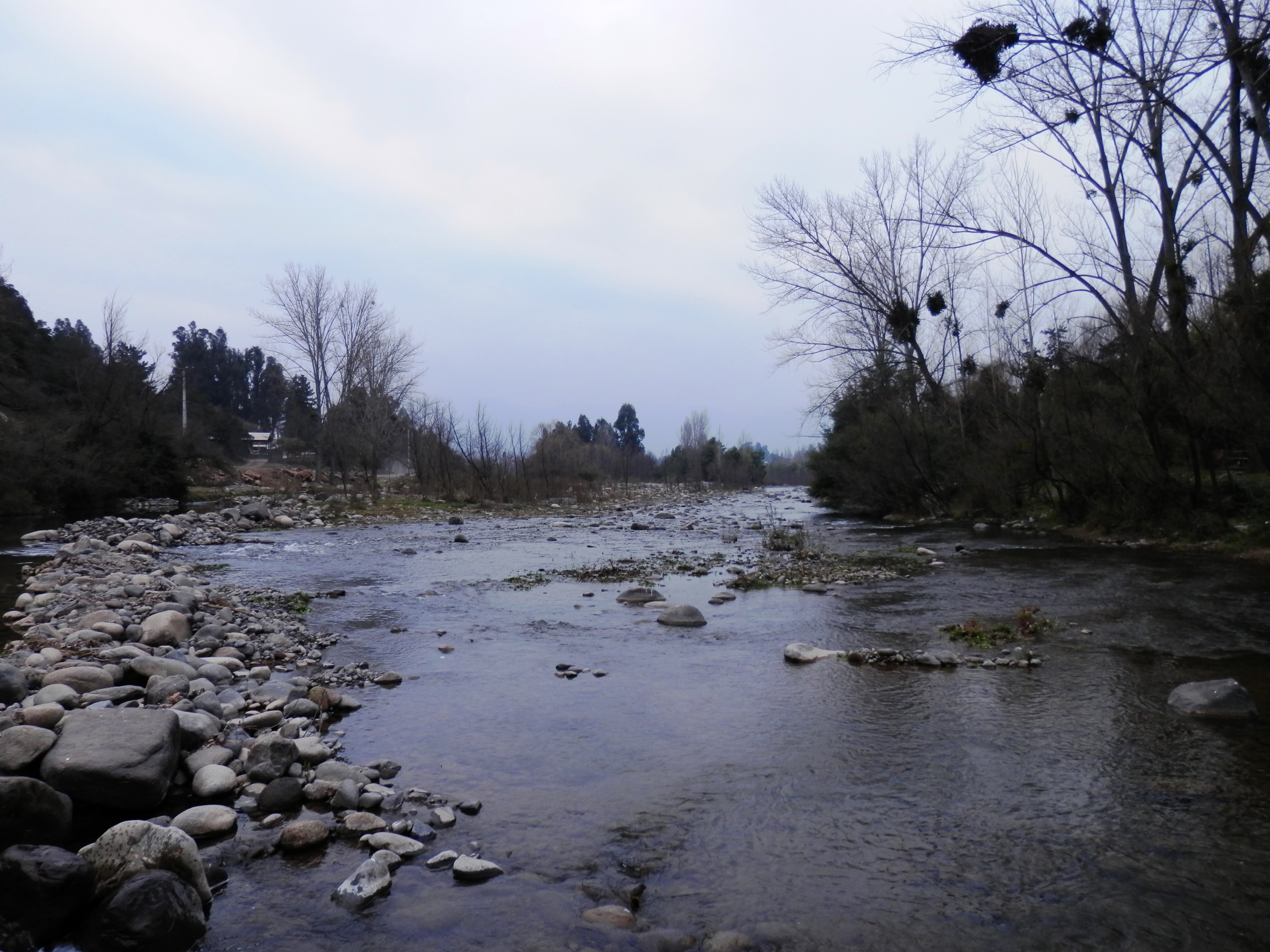

Location
- Country: Chile

The Claro River is a branch of the Tinguiririca River in the O'Higgins Region of Chile. The Claro River valley is an affluent community.

== See also ==
- List of rivers of Chile
