= Estero Alhué =

Coordinates: 34°09′S 71°23′W

Location
- Country: Chile

The Estero Alhué is a river of Chile.

== See also ==
- List of rivers of Chile
