= El Colorado (Chile) =

Ski resort in Chile

Coordinates: 33°20′57″S 70°17′32″W

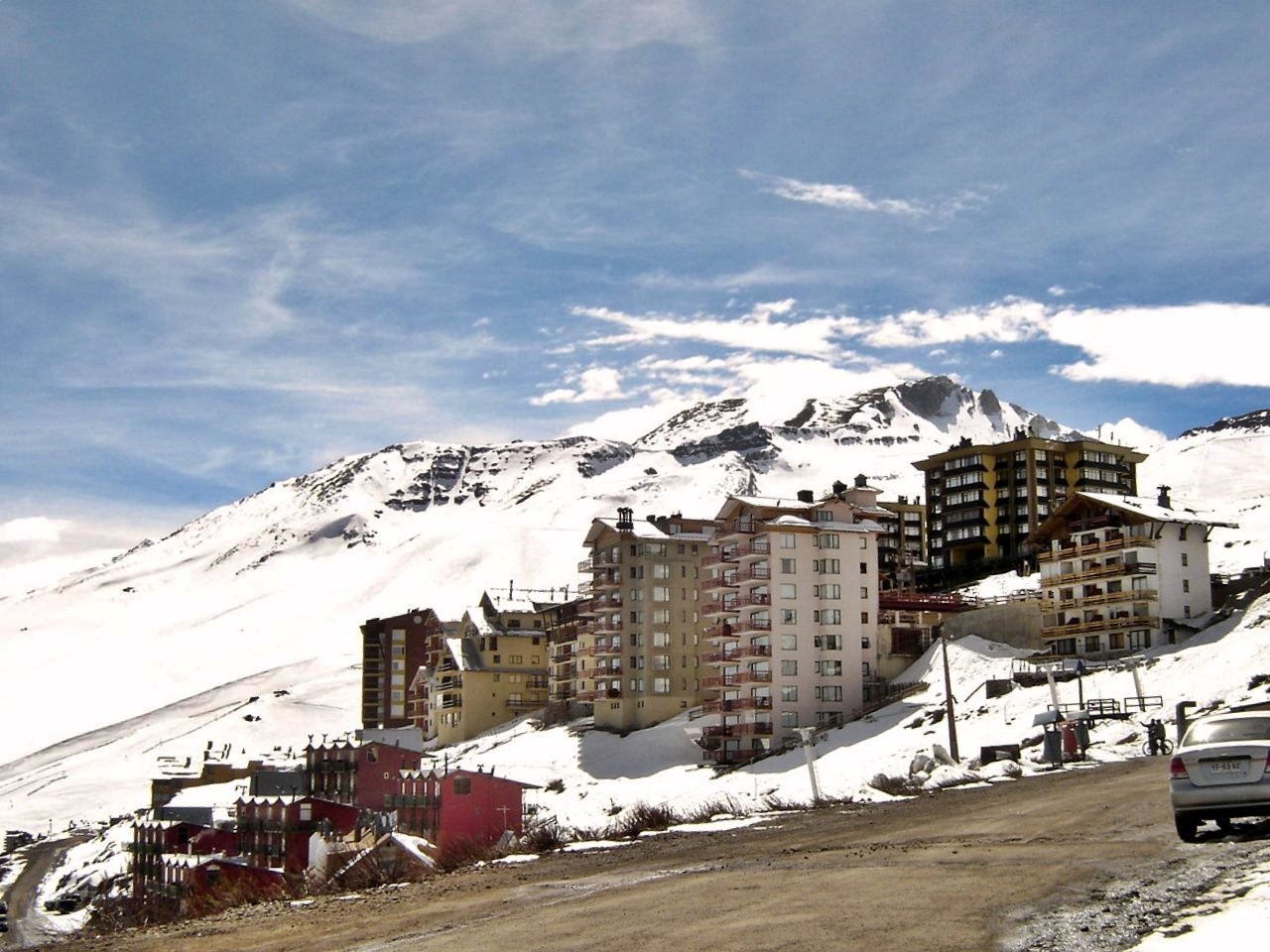
- Interactive map of El Colorado
- Location: Andes Mountains, Chile
- Nearest city: Santiago
- Status: Active
- Vertical: 903 m
- Top elevation: 1540 m
- Base elevation: 2430 m
- Skiable area: 1300 ha
- Trails: 14
- Lift system: 4 chairlift, 11 surface lift, 1 rope tow
- Snowmaking: Yes
- Night skiing: No
- Website: www.elcolorado.cl

El Colorado is a Chilean ski resort located 39 km from Santiago. Situated in the Andes Mountains, it can be reached in approximately one hour via paved road. Located on Cerro Colorado, with a maximum height of 3333 m and a vertical drop of 903 m. It receives abundant and short snowfalls with an average of 3.5 m of snow precipitation in a normal year, making it an important winter tourist destination in the Metropolitan Region.

On September 9, 2012, the "Snow Battle 2012" event took place, a hard-ski competition that combined skiing, crossing, and hiking in which 80 amateur skiers competed.

== Infrastructure ==
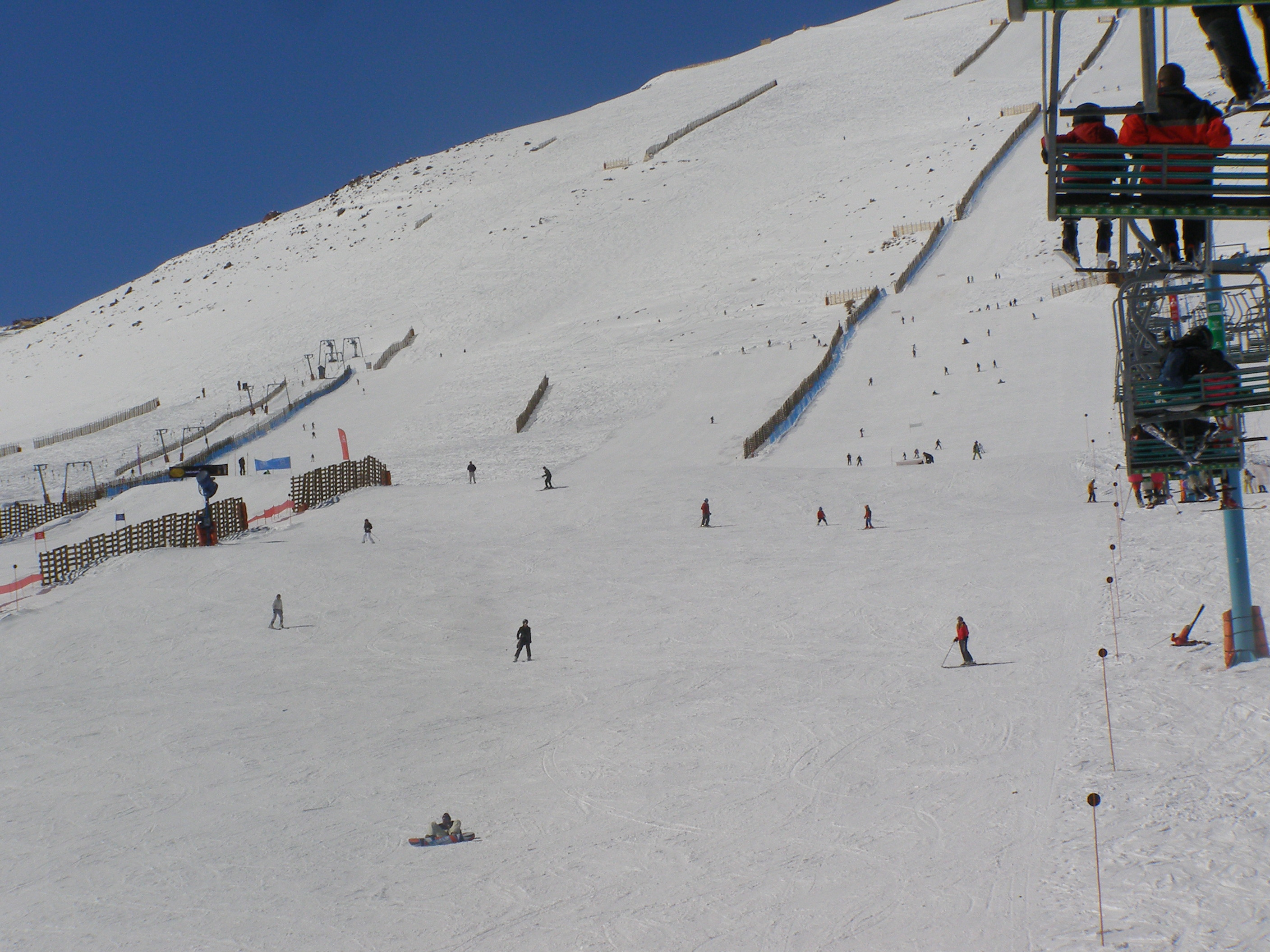
El Colorado in August 2012

- 98 Ski Slopes
- 1 Snowpark
- 16 Lifts
- 4 Chairlifts
- 11 T-bar
- 1 Ropetow (school)
- 1 Platter
- 1 Ski Carousel
- 1 Ski School
- 1 Mini Ski School
- 2 Rental Shops
- 6 Restaurants
- 1 Cafeteria
- 1 Mountain Emergency
- 1 Ski Shop

== Snowpark ==
=== Infrastructure ===
- 40 Modules + 8 Jumps
- Park Area: 119,660 m^{2}
- Built Area: 94,160 m^{2}
- Access Lifts: 2 drag lifts (“Colorado Chico 1 and 2”)
- Boardercross Distance: 250 m^{2} length
- American bus
