= Yerba Loca Nature Sanctuary =

Protected area in Chile

- IUCN category IV (habitat/species management area)
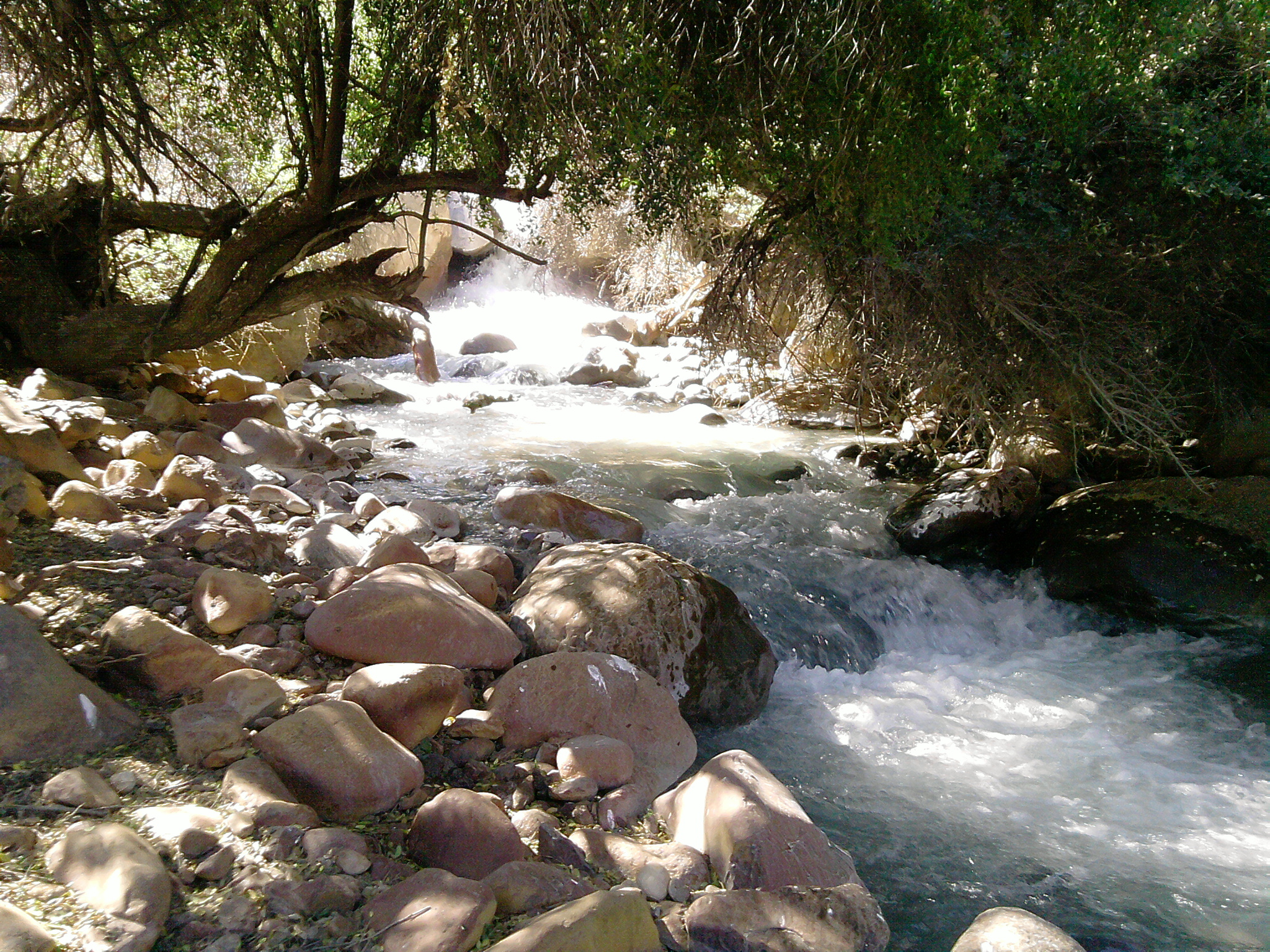
- Estero Yerba loca
- Interactive map of Yerba Loca Nature Sanctuary
- Location: Santiago Metropolitan Region, Chile
- Nearest city: Lo Barnechea
- Coordinates: 33.3333°S 70.3000°W
- Area: 390.29 km^{2} (150.69 sq mi)
- Designated: 1973
- Governing body: Municipality of Lo Barnechea

Yerba Loca Nature Sanctuary is a protected area in Santiago Metropolitan Area of Chile. It is east of Santiago in the commune of Lo Barnechea.
