= Estero Yerba Loca =

Coordinates: 33.3437°S 70.3620°W

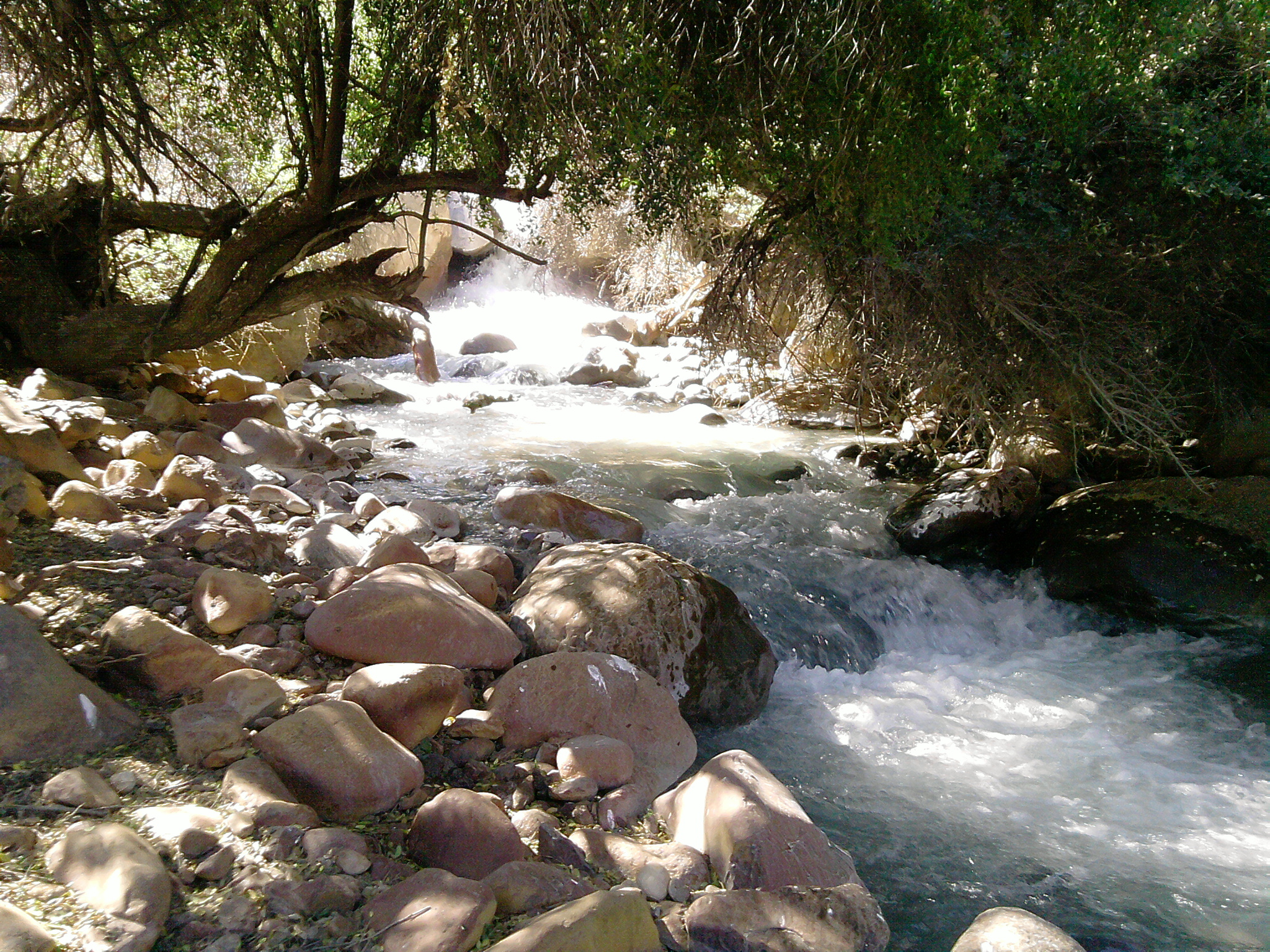

Location
- Country: Chile

Physical characteristics
- Source
  - elevation: 3,280 m
- Mouth
  - elevation: 1,200 m
- Length: 16 km

The Estero Yerba Loca is a river of Chile.

== See also ==
- List of rivers of Chile
