= Rapel Dam =

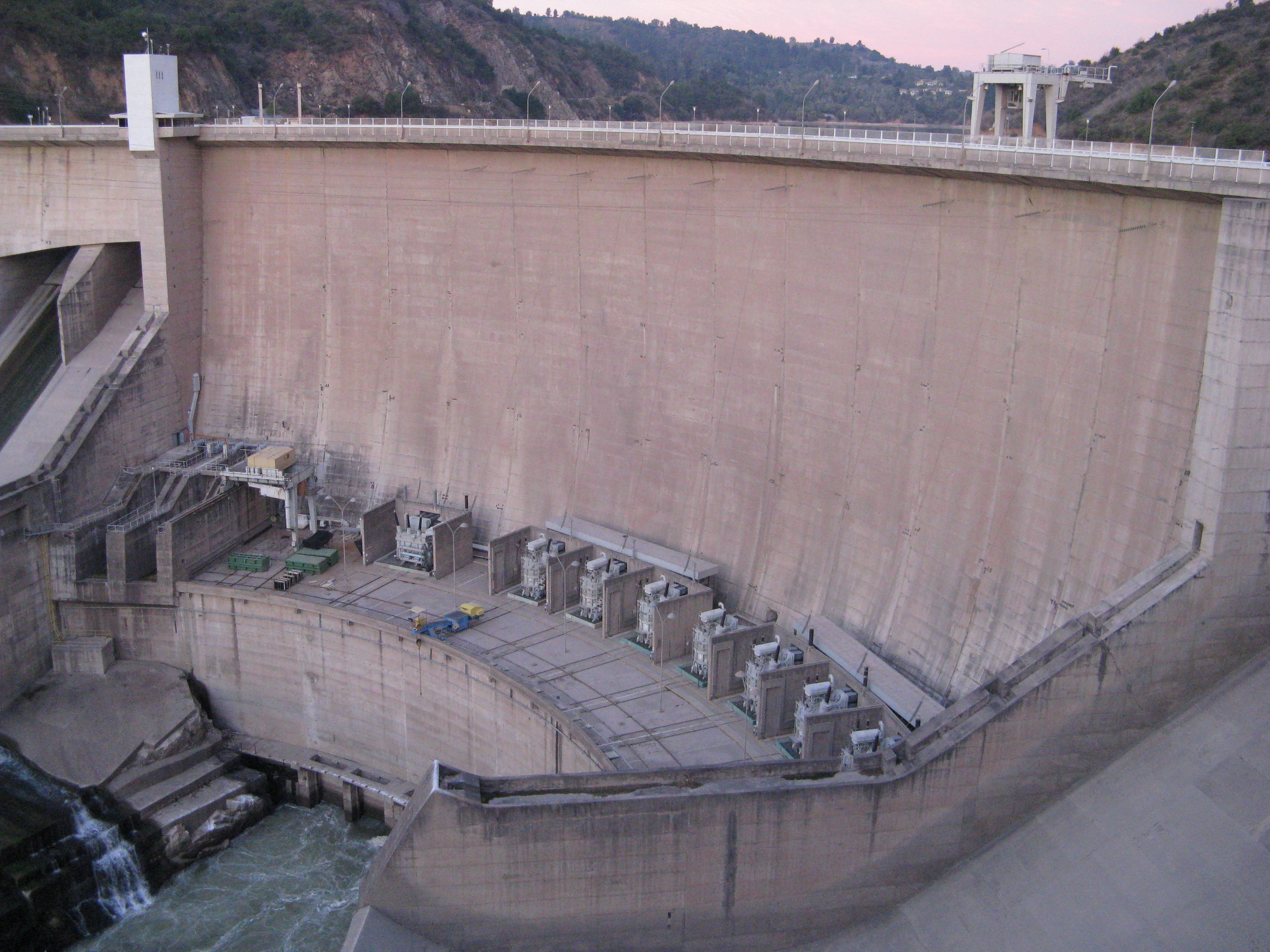

- Location within Chile
- Official name: Presa Rapel
- Country: Chile
- Location: La Estrella
- Coordinates: 34°02′29″S 71°35′19″W
- Opening date: 1968
- Owner: Endesa

Dam and spillways
- Type of dam: Arch, variable radius
- Impounds: Rapel River
- Height: 112 m (367 ft)
- Length: 350 m (1,148 ft)
- Width (crest): 5.5 m (18 ft)
- Width (base): 19 m (62 ft)
- Spillway capacity: 10,000 m^{3}/s (353,147 cu ft/s)

Reservoir
- Creates: Lake Rapel
- Total capacity: 700,000,000 m^{3} (567,499 acre⋅ft)
- Active capacity: 530,000,000 m^{3} (429,678 acre⋅ft)

Power Station
- Commission date: 1968; 58 years ago
- Hydraulic head: 76 m (249 ft) (net)
- Turbines: 5 x 75.4 MW Francis-type
- Installed capacity: 377 MW

The Rapel Dam is an arch dam on the Rapel River about 19 km (12 mi) north of La Estrella in the Libertador General Bernardo O'Higgins Region, Chile. The primary purpose of the dam is hydroelectric power generation and it supports a 377 MW power station. The dam was completed in 1968 and is owned by Endesa. It creates the largest reservoir in Chile with a capacity of 700,000,000 m^{3} (567,499 acre⋅ft). The dam withstood the 7.5 M_{w} 1985 Rapel Lake earthquake with only minor damage. It was centered 45 km (28 mi) from the dam.

== Design ==
The Rapel Dam is a 112-metre (367 ft) tall and 350-metre (1,150 ft) long variable-radius arch-type. It is 5.5 metres (18 ft) wide at its crest and 19 metres (62 ft) wide at its base. The dam's spillway is controlled by five tainter gates and has a discharge capacity of 10,000 cubic metres per second (350,000 cu ft/s). The dam's reservoir, Lake Rapel has a 700,000,000 cubic metres (570,000 acre⋅ft) capacity of which 530 million cubic metres (430,000 acre⋅ft) is active capacity.

== Power station ==
The power station, located at the dam's base, contains five 75.4 megawatts (101,100 hp) Francis turbine-generators and is afforded 76 metres (249 ft) of net hydraulic head.
