= Rapel Lake =

Lake in Chile

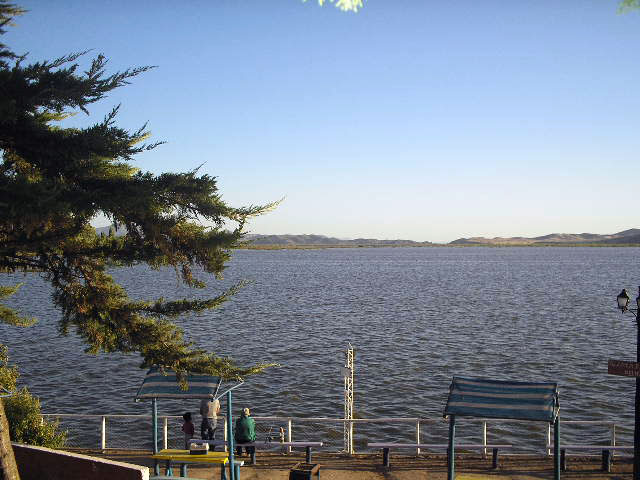

- Location within Chile
- Coordinates: 34°08′S 71°30′W
- Type: reservoir
- Primary inflows: Cachapoal River; Tinguiririca River
- Primary outflows: Rapel River
- Basin countries: Chile
- Surface area: 80 km^{2} (31 sq mi)
- Surface elevation: 110 m (360 ft)

Rapel Lake (Spanish: Lago Rapel or Embalse Rapel) is an artificial lake created by a dam on the Rapel River. It is located in the Libertador General Bernardo O'Higgins Region, Central Chile.

The reservoir was created with the aim of feeding the Rapel Hydroelectric Plant.

== See also ==
- 1985 Rapel Lake earthquake

== Sources ==
- Cuenca del río Rapel
