= Tinguiririca River =

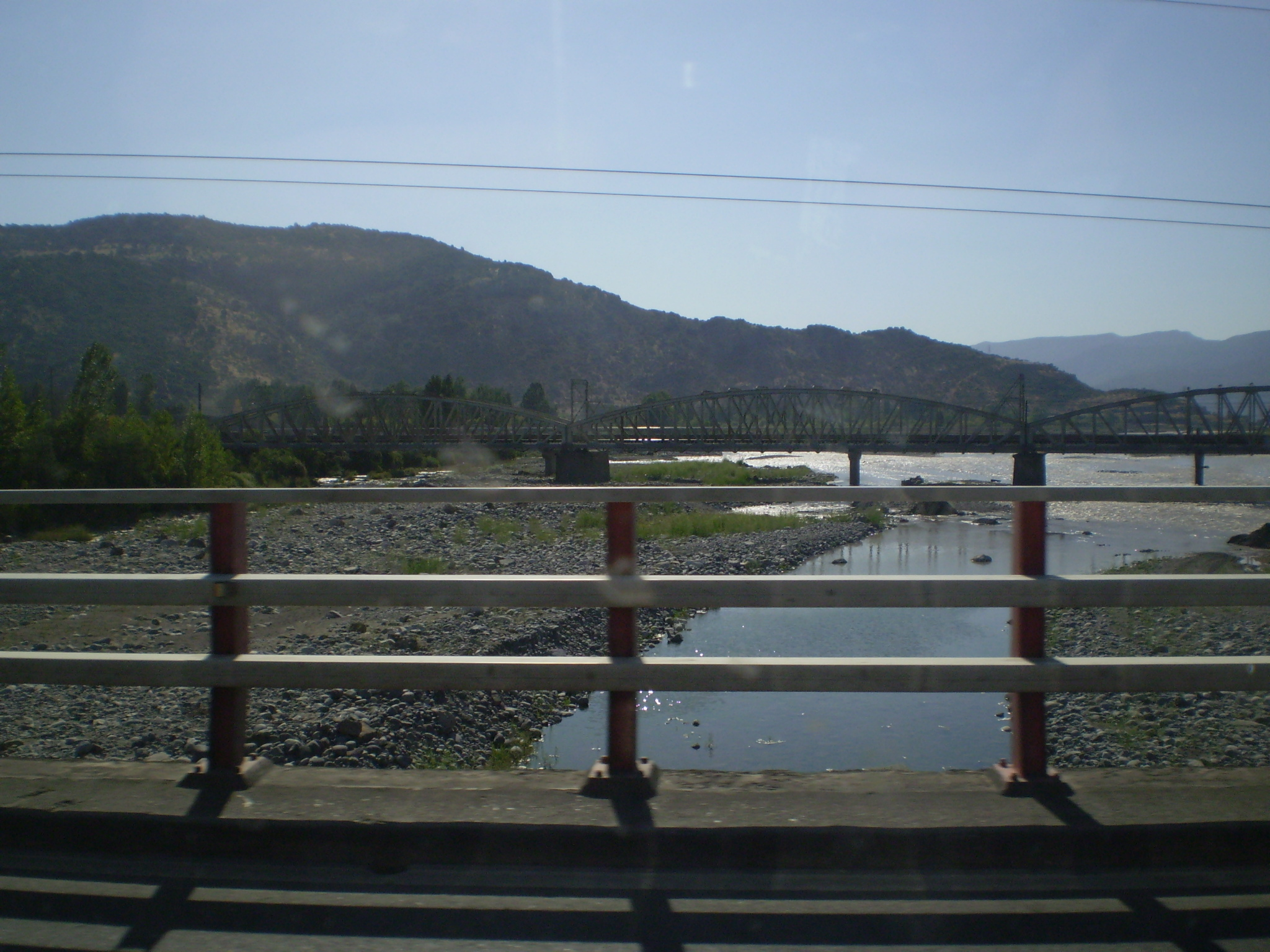

Location
- Country: Chile

Physical characteristics
- Mouth
  - location: Rapel Lake
- Length: 167 km (104 mi)
- Basin size: 4,730 km^{2} (1,830 sq mi)

Tinguiririca River is a river of Chile located in the Libertador General Bernardo O'Higgins Region. It rises in the Andes, at the confluence of the rivers Las Damas and Del Azufre. From its source, it flows northwest for about 56 km to the vicinity of the city of San Fernando. In this portion of its course, the river receives the waters of the tributaries Clarillo and Claro. Then the river flows southwest and then turns northwest to empty into Rapel Lake.

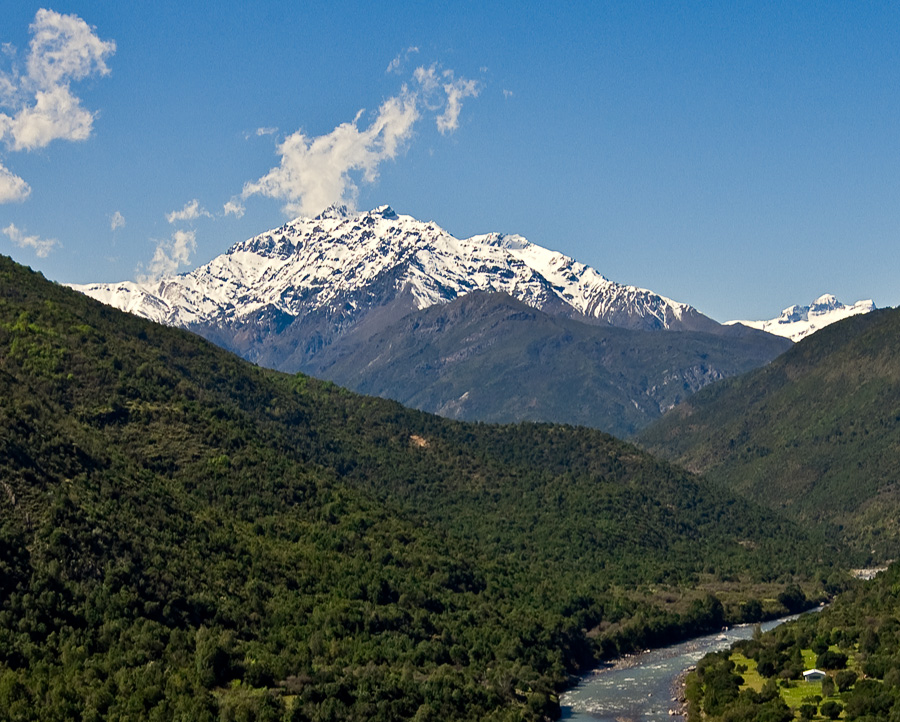
Tiguiririca River and Cerro Alto de los Lirios (3053 m)

== See also ==
- Tinguiririca Volcano
