= List of rivers of the Coquimbo Region =

The information regarding List of rivers in the Coquimbo Region on this page has been compiled from the data supplied by GeoNames. It includes all features named "Rio", "Canal", "Arroyo", "Estero" and those Feature Code is associated with a stream of water. (Note: The arbitrarily selected codes are RPDS, CHN, CNLA, CNLB, CNLD, CNLI, CNLN, CNLSB, CRKT, DTCH, DTCHI, DTCHD, ESTY, FORD, SBED, STM, STMA, STMB, STMC, STMD, STMH, STMI, STMIX, STMM, STMQ, STMS, STMSB, STMX, TNLC, WTRC, WTRH) This list contains 121 water streams.

== Content ==
This list contains:

1. Name of the stream, in Spanish Language
2. Coordinates are latitude and longitude of the feature in ± decimal degrees, at the mouth of the stream
3. Link to a map including the Geonameid (a number which uniquely identifies a Geoname feature)
4. Feature Code explained in
5. Other names for the same feature, if any
6. Basin countries additional to Chile, if any

== List ==
Rivers of Coquimbo Region

- Río Elqui • 29.89311°S 71.26966°W • 3890618 • STM • (Rio Elaui, Rio Elqui, Río Elaui, Río Elqui)

- Río Claro • 29.98323°S 70.56345°W • 3894574 • STM • (Rio Claro, Rio Derecho, Río Claro, Río Derecho)

- Río Cochiguas • 30.10152°S 70.4903°W • 3894494 • STM • Cochiguaz

- Río Turbio • 29.98273°S 70.56416°W • 3868887 • STM

- Río La Laguna • 29.97596°S 70.09526°W • 3885520 • STM • (Rio La Laguna, Rio Laguna, Rio de la Laguna, Río La Laguna, Río Laguna, Río de la Laguna)
- Río Toro • 29.90604°S 70.05257°W • 3869545 • STM

- Río Vacas Heladas • 29.90671°S 70.05181°W • 3868731 • STM
- Río Malo • 29.83352°S 70.02222°W • 3880822 • STM • (Rio Malo, Rio de los Banos, Río Malo, Río de los Baños)

- Quebrada de los Choros • 29.30538°S 71.36334°W • 3894838 • STM • (Quebrada Los Choros, Quebrada de los Choros, Rio Los Choros, Rio de los Choros, Río Los Choros)
- Quebrada Río Lisboa • 29.75°S 70.73333°W • 3873121 • STM
- Estero Punilla • 29.79458°S 70.253°W • 3874821 • STM
- Estero Negro • 29.83273°S 70.02349°W • 3878813 • STM • (Estero Negro, Quebrada del Negro)
- Estero de Pucalume • 29.83333°S 70.51667°W • 3875108 • STM
- Estero de Guanta • 29.84708°S 70.38708°W • 3888415 • STM • (Estero Guanta, Estero Huanta, Estero Malposo de Guanta, Estero de Guanta)
- Estero Tilo • 29.86725°S 70.3525°W • 3869826 • STM
- Río Ingaguas • 29.98934°S 70.25037°W • 3887195 • STM
- Río Seco • 30.02483°S 70.08935°W • 3871054 • STM
- Estero Lagunilla • 30.11838°S 71.36289°W • 3885718 • STM • (Estero Lagunilla, Estero Lagunillas, Quebrada Lagunilla, Quebrada Lagunillas)
- Río Laguna • 30.1°S 70.1°W • 3885783 • STM
- Río La Gloria • 30.23699°S 70.03041°W • 3885860 • STM
- Río Colorado • 30.25642°S 70.02025°W • 3894036 • STM
- Estero Tongoy • 30.25734°S 71.48996°W • 3869637 • STM
- Río Tangue • 30.3°S 71.57222°W • 3870163 • STM • (Quebrada Tangue, Rio Tangue, Río Tangue) • (CL)
- Río Chacay • 30.40501°S 70.79567°W • 3895748 • STM • (Quebrada de Chacay, Rio Chacay, Rio de Chacai, Río Chacay, Río de Chacai)
- Río Ternero • 30.5685°S 70.305°W • 3869938 • STM
- Estero Aguada • 30.58235°S 71.28167°W • 3900552 • STM
- Estero Ingenio • 30.63111°S 71.33173°W • 3887189 • STM • (Estero Ingenio, Quebrada del Ingenio)
- Estero Punitaqui • 30.67092°S 71.52933°W • 3874811 • STM • (Estero Punitaqui, Quebrada Punitaqui, Río Punitaqui, Río Punitaqui)
- Río Ponio • 30.70466°S 70.92291°W • 3875458 • STM • (Rio Campanario, Rio Ponio, Río Campanario, Río Ponio)
- Río Tomes • 30.7191°S 70.78437°W • 3869649 • STM
- Río Limarí • 30.72956°S 71.69994°W • 3883198 • STM

- Estero Punitaqui • 30.63333°S 71.53333°W • 3874812 • STM
- Río Grande • 30.59114°S 71.16695°W • 3888780 • STM

- Río Guatulame • 30.7192°S 71.02884°W • 3888321 • STM • (Rio Guatalame, Rio Guatulame, Río Guatulame)

- Río Pama • 31.11224°S 71.07624°W • 3877494 • STM
- Río Cogotí • 30.86854°S 70.99634°W • 3894438 • STM

- Río Combarbalá • 31.112°S 71.07577°W • 3893961 • STM

- Río Rapel • 30.71505°S 70.88263°W • 3873715 • STM

- Río Los Molles • 30.74375°S 70.61828°W • 3881729 • STM • (Rio Los Molles, Rio de las Molles, Río Los Molles, Río de las Molles)

- Rio Hurtado • 30.59389°S 71.16333°W • 3887425 • STM • (Rio Hurtado)

- Río Mostazal • 30.84037°S 70.77772°W • 3879250 • STM • (Rio Mostazal, Rio Motazal, Río Mostazal, Río Motazal)
- Río Tascadero • 31.01422°S 70.66772°W • 3870097 • STM

- Canal La Arena • 30.73752°S 70.57468°W • 3886536 • DTCHI
- Río Palomo • 30.74276°S 70.61845°W • 3877550 • STM
- Estero Cachaco • 30.75541°S 71.38631°W • 3897541 • STM
- Río Colorado • 30.78333°S 70.41667°W • 3894035 • STM
- Canal Polqui • 30.79102°S 70.9242°W • 3875487 • DTCHI
- Río San Miguel • 30.81298°S 70.61075°W • 3871885 • STM
- Río Tulahuencito • 30.85225°S 70.71583°W • 3868956 • STM
- Río Chacay • 30.9182°S 70.6374°W • 3895747 • STM
- Río Patillos • 30.95972°S 70.45942°W • 3876995 • STM
- Río Colorado • 30.97615°S 70.4091°W • 3894034 • STM
- Estero de Quiles • 30.99215°S 71.48308°W • 3874220 • STM
- Quebrada Almendro • 31.01308°S 71.39212°W • 3900042 • STM • (Estero Almendro, Quebrada Almendro)
- Estero Almendro • 31.01667°S 71.41667°W • 3900044 • STM • (Estero Almendro, Quebrada del Almendro) • (CL)
- Río Torca • 31.02086°S 70.70584°W • 3869612 • STM
- Estero Peral • 31.02447°S 71.42091°W • 3876583 • STM
- Río Turbio • 31.03333°S 70.6°W • 3868886 • STM
- Río Gordito • 31.06534°S 70.39544°W • 3888884 • STM
- Quebrada Chépica • 31.12833°S 70.83583°W • 3895253 • STM • (Estero Chepica, Estero Chépica, Quebrada Chepic, Quebrada Chepica, Quebrada Chépica)
- Estero Chépica • 31.13333°S 70.83333°W • 3895256 • STM
- Estero Valle Hermoso • 31.26807°S 70.99641°W • 3868637 • STM • (Estero Valle Hermoso, Quebrada Valle Hermoso)
- Quebrada Llampangui • 31.29362°S 71.19645°W • 3883012 • STM • (Quebrada Llampangui, Rio Llaucaven)
- Estero del Colihue • 31.37276°S 71.35068°W • 3894251 • STM • (Estero Colihue, Estero del Colihue)
- Estero Llano Largo • 31.37335°S 71.34959°W • 3882967 • STM
- Estero del Cobre • 31.38333°S 70.66667°W • 3894518 • STM
- Estero Canaleta • 31.3834°S 70.65293°W • 3897029 • STM
- Río Negro • 31.39171°S 70.6597°W • 3878787 • STM
- Quebrada Almendro • 31.39225°S 71.43845°W • 3900041 • STM • (Estero Almendro, Quebrada Almendro)
- Estero de la Yerba Loca • 31.4025°S 70.67669°W • 3867676 • STM
- Estero Carrizo • 31.42728°S 70.71454°W • 3896451 • STM
- Estero Olla • 31.4667°S 70.77065°W • 3878091 • STM
- Estero Cenicero • 31.47053°S 70.76685°W • 3896016 • STM
- Río Tres Quebradas • 31.47079°S 70.76572°W • 3869138 • STM
- Estero Chañar • 31.47344°S 70.78707°W • 3895563 • STM
- Quebrada Negra • 31.48653°S 70.79154°W • 3878920 • STM • (Estero del Agua Negra, Quebrada Negra)
- Estero Burras • 31.51059°S 70.81474°W • 3897695 • STM
- Estero Corico • 31.55143°S 71.10805°W • 3893561 • STM
- Río Carén • 31.56099°S 70.83296°W • 3896671 • STM
- Estero Canela • 31.58396°S 71.48088°W • 3896950 • STM
- Estero Polcura • 31.6079°S 70.63334°W • 3875533 • STM • (Estero Polcura, Rio Los Estero Polcura, Río Los Estero Polcura)
- Estero Millahue • 31.62238°S 71.55469°W • 3879881 • STM
- Río Choapa • 31.6224°S 71.55632°W • 3894913 • STM • (Chuapa, Rio Choapa, Rio Choapo, Río Choapa, Río Choapo)

- Río Illapel • 31.67264°S 71.28442°W • 3887342 • STM

- Estero Auco • 31.66667°S 71.28333°W • 3899144 • STM • (Estero Auco, Estero Aucó)

- Estero Camisas • 31.76955°S 71.06571°W • 3897138 • STM • (Estero Camisas)
- Río Chalinga • 31.77813°S 70.98639°W • 3895622 • STM
- Río Cuncumén • 31.89675°S 70.64248°W • 3892971 • STM

- Río Los Helados • 31.65381°S 70.6368°W • 3882020 • STM • (Helados, Rio Los Helados, Río Los Helados)
- Estero Puertecillas • 31.65438°S 70.63613°W • 3875001 • STM
- Estero La Canela • 31.66667°S 71.46667°W • 3886360 • STM
- Estero Tomé • 31.6765°S 70.76934°W • 3869656 • STM
- Estero Cunlagua • 31.73317°S 70.88845°W • 3892962 • STM
- Estero Limáhuida • 31.75169°S 71.15896°W • 3883204 • STM
- Estero Chigualoco • 31.75316°S 71.5156°W • 3950082 • STM
- Estero Piuquenes • 31.76107°S 70.58715°W • 3875725 • STM
- Río de los Pelambres • 31.80411°S 70.54936°W • 3876804 • STM • (Estero Pelambres, Rio de los Pelambres, Río de los Pelambres)
- Río Cerro Blanco • 31.80498°S 70.54907°W • 3895863 • STM
- Estero de Quelén • 31.85593°S 70.84544°W • 3874435 • STM
- Estero Pupío • 31.86116°S 71.3822°W • 3874671 • STM
- Estero Cavilolén • 31.86786°S 71.40057°W • 3896079 • STM
- Estero Conchali • 31.88024°S 71.49779°W • 3950056 • STM
- Río del Valle • 31.89757°S 70.64271°W • 3868660 • STM
- Estero Durazno • 31.91507°S 70.91282°W • 3892121 • STM
- Quebrada Manzano • 31.93614°S 70.6101°W • 3880604 • STM • (Estero del Manzano, Quebrada Manzano)
- Río Portillo • 31.94232°S 70.41561°W • 3875376 • STM
- Río Alitre • 31.95658°S 70.37717°W • 3900080 • STM
- Estero Mauro • 31.96138°S 71.02573°W • 3880293 • STM • (Estero Mauro, Quebrada Mauro)
- Río González • 31.98469°S 70.51661°W • 3888905 • STM
- Estero Ojotas • 31.98818°S 70.26249°W • 3878120 • STM
- Río Yunque • 31.99392°S 70.33539°W • 3867605 • STM
- Río del Totoral • 31.994°S 70.57844°W • 3869428 • STM
- Río de la Chicharra • 32.00054°S 70.54478°W • 3895210 • STM • (Estero Chicharra, Rio de La Chicharra, Rio de la Chicharra, Río de La Chicharra, Río de la Chicharra)
- Estero de Barraza • 32.0027°S 70.33047°W • 3898692 • STM
- Estero Colorado • 32.07616°S 70.59416°W • 3894055 • STM
- Río Leiva • 32.08553°S 70.46996°W • 3883427 • STM
- Estero Potrero Largo • 32.09053°S 70.44559°W • 3875268 • STM
- Estero de la Yaretas • 32.20368°S 70.39132°W • 3867734 • STM • (Estero de la Yaretas, Rio de las Llaretas, Río de las Llaretas)
- Río Blanco • 32.20416°S 70.39168°W • 3898217 • STM
- Estero Angostura • 32.21003°S 70.39254°W • 3899603 • STM
- Río de las Llaretas • 32.2°S 70.41667°W • 3882934 • STM
- Río Quilimarí • 32.12202°S 71.51249°W • 3874201 • STM

== See also ==
- List of lakes in Chile
- List of volcanoes in Chile
- List of islands of Chile
- List of fjords, channels, sounds and straits of Chile
- List of lighthouses in Chile
