= Combarbalá =

City and commune in Coquimbo, Chile

- City and commune
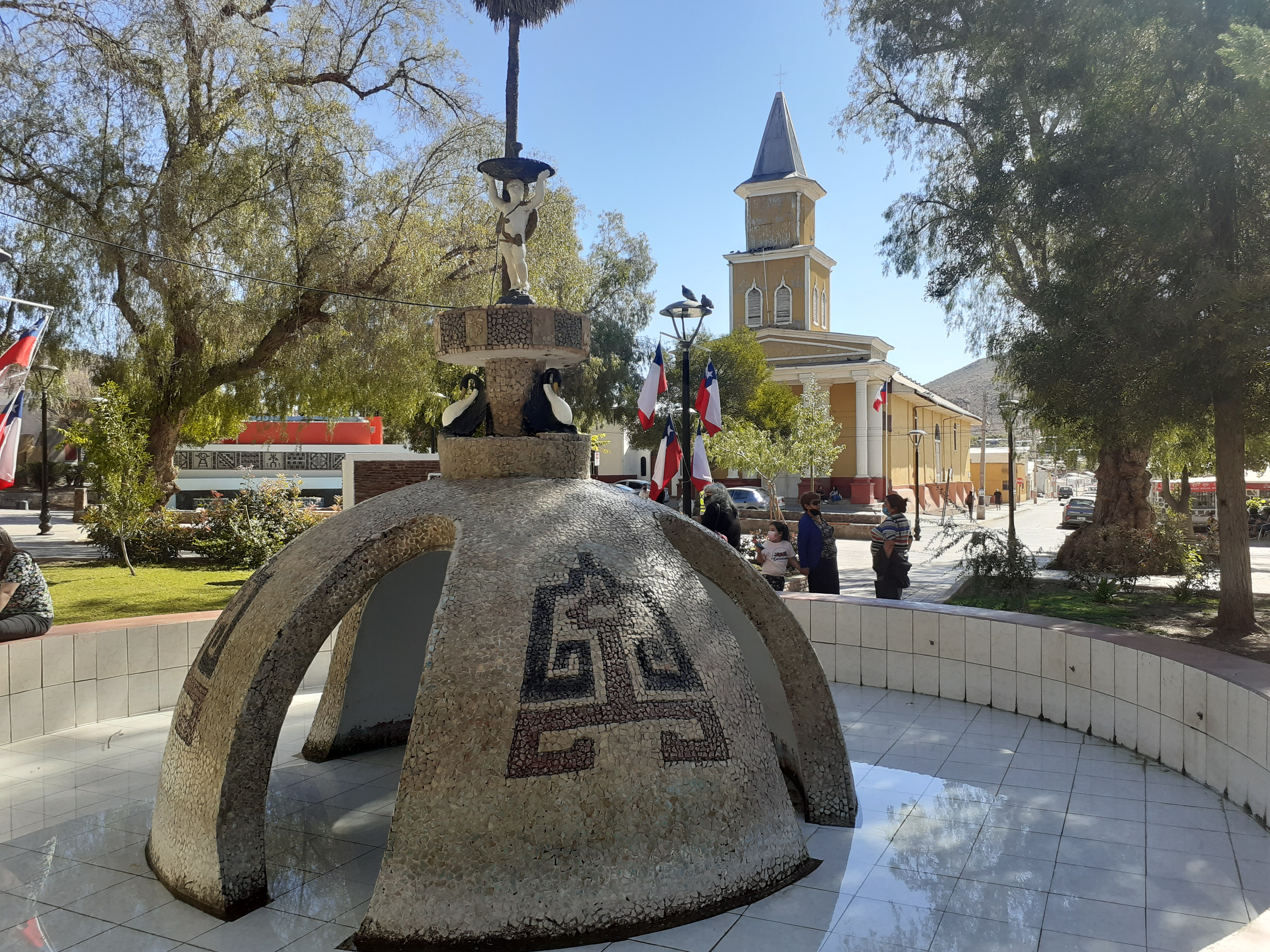
- Main square and San Francisco de Borja church

- Coat of arms Location in Chile
- Coordinates (city): 31°11′0″S 71°00′0″W
- Country: Chile
- Region: Coquimbo
- Province: Limarí
- Founded: November 30, 1789

Government
  - Type: Municipality
  - Alcalde: Solercio Rojas Aguirre (PRI)

Area
  - Total: 1,895.9 km^{2} (732.0 sq mi)
- Elevation: 904 m (2,966 ft)

Population (2012 Census)
  - Total: 13,605
  - Density: 7.1760/km^{2} (18.586/sq mi)
  - Urban: 5,494
  - Rural: 7,989

Sex
  - Men: 6,695
  - Women: 6,788
- Time zone: UTC−4 (CLT)
  - Summer (DST): UTC−3 (CLST)
- Website: Municipality of Combarbalá

Combarbalá is the capital city of the commune of Combarbala. It is located in the Limarí Province, Region of Coquimbo, at an elevation of 900 m (2,952 ft). It is known for the tourist astronomic observatory Cruz del Sur; the petroglyphs of Rincon las Chilcas; its typical handcraft made of the unique combarbalita stone; the classical basketball match at the end February; the Virgen de la Piedra catholic-pagan festivity, among other tourist attractions.

== Origin of the name ==
There are two hypotheses that might to explain the origin of the name "Combarbalá". Both hypothesis are rooted in the Spanish transliteration of the aborigine name of the area. The first hypothesis holds that the word Combarbalá is derived from the Quechua word "Cumparpayay", which means "to break with a hammer", and designates the usual labor for obtaining minerals and stones from mines.

The second hypothesis holds that the origin of the word Combarbalá comes from the Mapudungun word "Co Cam Bala", where "Co" means Water, "Cam" means Far, and "Bala" means Duck. Thus, Cocambala literally means "far away water with ducks", or Duck's pond. In fact, there is a place known as Duck's pond very near to the city. This pond was used as a resting place by the Inca army in their advance to the south, and then by the Spanish conquistadores Diego de Almagro first, and later by Pedro de Valdivia.

People of Combarbalá likes to make jokes about the name of the city: they hold that an aborigine of the area, who was named "La", left to travel with the Spaniards. "La" got used to shaving his face and returned with a dense beard, something unusual because South American aborigines don't grow beards. Because of this, people named the area as the place where "Con-Barba-La" —literally with-beard-La or bearded La—lived. This history is told for the amusement of children's during the celebration of the city foundation anniversary.

== History ==
=== Prehispanic ===
The geographical area where Combarbalá is located was originally populated by Molle, Diaguita and Inca people. Molle people were the first to inhabit the area. The Molle people were hunter-gatherers, although they also practiced some primal forms of agriculture. They inhabited the area from c. 400 BCE to c. 900 CE Their origins are still unknown, although some hypothesis trace them back to the Amazon rainforest, coming through what is now Bolivia to the Atacama and Coquimbo regions of Chile.

The Diaguita people arrived to the area c. 700 CE, about three hundred years after the Molle people. They crossed from Argentina through one of the several summer passages in the Andes mountain range. They practiced advanced forms of agriculture, pottery, stone work, weaving and metallurgy, mainly based on copper and bronze). They also carved figures in stone known as petroglyphs. These petroglyphs are believed to represent the cosmology of the Diaguita people. Nowadays, a number of these archeological treasures can be found in the area of Rincón las Chilcas.

The Inca conquerors arrived c. 1450 CE. It is believed that the conquest was peaceful, and mainly affected cultural aspects. They extended the Inca roads in the area, and practiced advanced forms of mining and agriculture.

=== Spanish Conquest and Colony ===
The failed expedition of Diego de Almagro arrived in the area in c. 1536. As it is known, they returned shortly after to Peru, empty handed. After that, the expedition of Pedro de Valdivia arrived to the area c. 1541. They found the valley mostly uninhabited, because most of the indigenous people were hiding in the hills. The indigenous were already afraid of Spaniards, because of the deeds of Almagro and his people. The first Spanish chronologist recording the name of "Cocambala" valley was Jeronimo de Vivar. He wrote: "It rains more heavier and more in summer (than Copiapó)... there are good rivers in this area". He described the number of inhabitants as "Not too many people".

Before the official foundation of the town, the life there was characterized for being extremely hard. The first census showed that the overall population of the area (Combarbalá, Cogotí and Pama) was 240 people, distributed across 60 families. Most of the activities were related to farming and shepherding. In 1757, the overall population was around 1,140 people. That same year, Bishop Manuel de Alday established the vice-Parish in the area. In 1774, this was advanced to parish status. Later, on March 3, 1789, neighbors of the area ask the Spanish governor, Ambrosio O'Higgins, to establish a church in the area. This finally happened on November 30, 1789. The original name of the city was "Villa de San Francisco de Borja de Combarbalá". The foundation was done by Captain Juan Ignacio Flores, under the authority of governor and later viceroy, Ambrosio O'Higgins.

At the beginning of the 18th century, mines of copper, gold and silver were discovered in the area. Thus, Combarbalá became an important mining center. However, during the mid 80's, the military dictatorship of Augusto Pinochet dismantled the mineral processing plant that operated in the city, thus ending the era of mining wealth, and putting the city into an era of economic uncertainty. Lately on the 90's, and thanks to techniques of dry areas irrigation, growing of export-grade grapes have become the main economical activity, but only generating seasonal employment.

== Geography ==
Combarbalá commune is located in the geographical area known as transversal valleys of central Chile. These are valleys that run perpendicularly from the Andes mountain range to the Coastal mountain range. The city is located right next to Combarbalá River, and the valley lies in between the Cogotí River valley to the north and the Valle Hermoso (Beautiful Valley) to the south. Those three are the main transversal valleys found in the commune.

Some important heights located in the commune of Combarbalá are:

- Pabellón Hill: 4,700 metres (15,400 ft) AMSL.
- Chaguareche Hill: 2,612 metres (8,570 ft) AMSL.
- Ramadilla Hill: 1,353 metres (4,439 ft) AMSL.
- Movilo Hill: 1,230 metres (4,040 ft) AMSL.

== Demographics ==
According to the 2002 census of the National Statistics Institute, Combarbalá spans an area of 1,895.9 km^{2} (732 sq mi) and has 13,483 inhabitants (6,695 men and 6,788 women). Of these, 5,494 (40.7%) lived in urban areas and 7,989 (59.3%) in rural areas. The population fell by 6.3% (899 persons) between the 1992 and 2002 censuses.

== Administration ==
As a commune, Combarbalá is a third-level administrative division of Chile administered by a municipal council, headed by an alcalde who is directly elected every four years. The 2008-2012 alcalde is Solercio Rojas Aguirre (PRI). The council has the following members:

- Miguel Oñate Collado (RN)
- Gustavo Hernández V. (PPD)
- Claudio Bravo Gallardo (PS)
- Bernardita Cortés Gómez (PDC)
- Miguel Viera Flores (PRI)
- Hugo Galleguillos Cortés (Ind.)

Within the electoral divisions of Chile, Combarbalá is represented in the Chamber of Deputies by Mrs. Adriana Muñoz (PDC) and Mr. Luis Lemus (Ind.) as part of the 9th electoral district, (together with Punitaqui, Monte Patria, Illapel, Salamanca, Los Vilos, Canela). The commune is represented in the Senate by Evelyn Matthei Fornet (UDI) and Jorge Pizarro Soto (PDC) as part of the 4th senatorial constituency (Coquimbo Region). In January 2011, Evelyn Matthei abandoned its elected senatorial position and it was replaced by Gonzalo Uriarte.

== Climate ==
Combarbalá's climate is semi-arid, with a relative humidity around 50%. Summer temperatures range from 24 to 33 °C (75 to 91 °F) with the much cooler nights typical of desert climates. Winter temperatures are generally above freezing, the minimum being ~3 °C (37 °F). Most of the year it is clear and sunny. Annual rainfall is about 200 mm, but long droughts and heavy rains are not rare in the region.

The vegetation found in the commune is typical of the area climate, adapted to the dryness and low relative humidity of the climate. Predominating species are in most of the area are different types of cacti, hawthorns and carob trees. However, in the valleys, near the rivers, is possible to find more water-demanding species, like Eucalyptus and Weeping Willows.

Cogoti Dam in the Commune of Combarbalá

Rivers in the area are fed by two main sources: rain and melting snow. Because of this, their levels rise at least twice a year: in winter due to rains, and in summer due to snow melting. In a normal year, rains can be up to 200 mm. But periods of drought or heavy raining are not uncommon.

There are a number of small rivers that come down from the Andes mountain chain, which tribute their water to the three main rivers in the commune: Combarbalá, Cogotí and Pama. All of them end at the Cogotí dam, which has a capacity of 150 million cubic meters (~39 billion gallons). From there, it flows into the Guatulame River and then to La Paloma dam in the commune of Monte Patria.

== Economic activities ==
For almost two centuries, Combarbalá's main economic activity has been mining of copper, gold and silver. However, due to the decline of smaller mining operations, these activities have been greatly diminished. Besides mining, other activities such as agriculture, goat shepherding, and craft work of Combarbalita stone have become important productive activities. There are a number of artisans in the area that work with the stone and produce a variety of decorative and utilitarian objects. Goat cheese is also a famous product of the zone, and export-grade grape production has become the main agricultural activity, with the only caveat that it produces seasonal work.

Combarbalá is served by La Pelicana Airport, an airstrip 13 kilometres (8.1 mi) to the north.

== Tourism ==
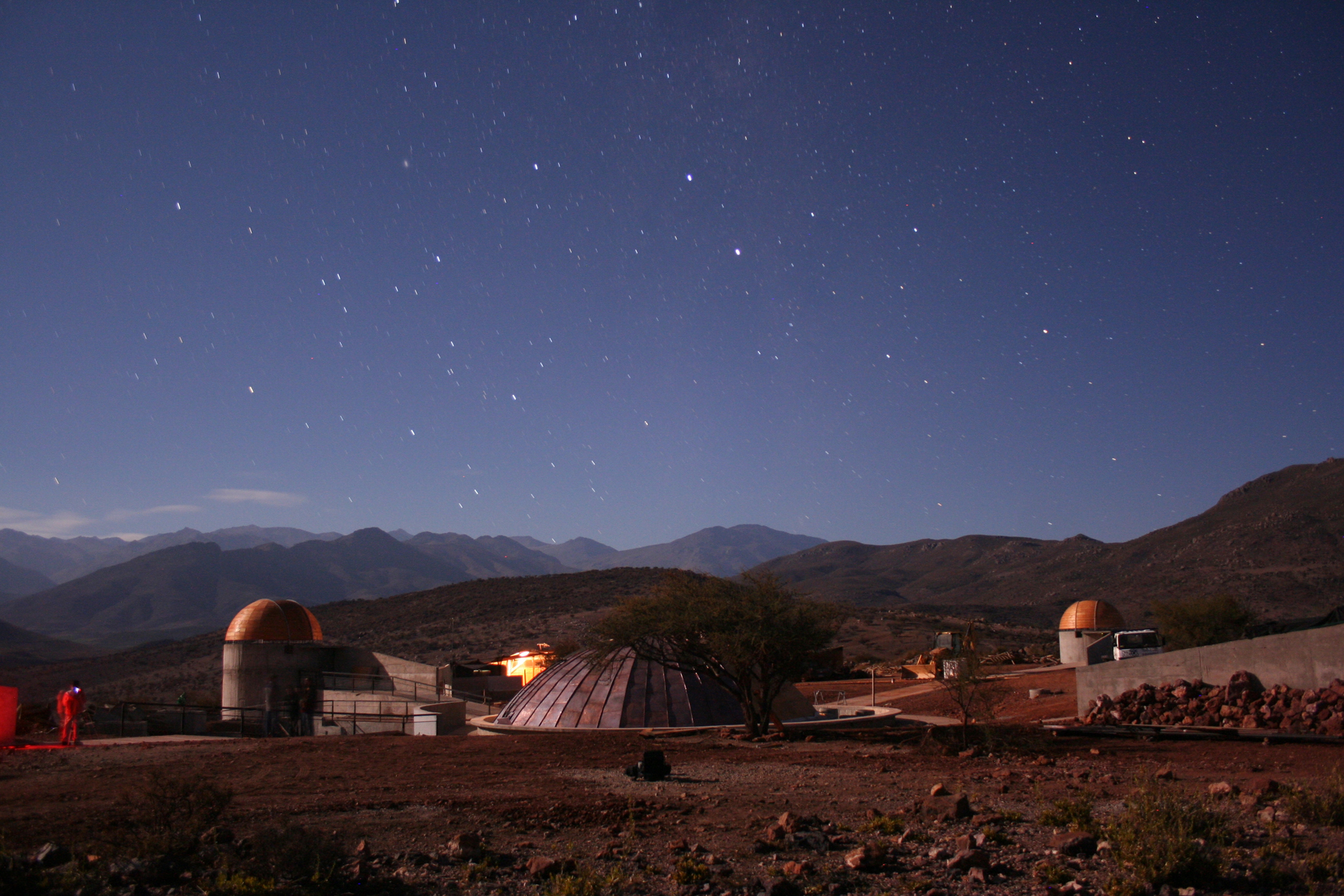
Cruz del Sur Observatory

There are a variety of tourist attractions in the area. The main ones are:

Southern Cross Astronomical Observatory

The tourist astronomical observatory is open to the general public. It has four main domes, each equipped with a potent telescope. Tours are held that guide the tourist through the astronomy in Chile, ancient astronomical beliefs of other cultures, and an observation of planets and stars through any of the four main telescopes.

La Isla religious festivals

On the first Sunday in May, Catholics participate in the traditional religious celebration of the Virgin of the Stone, in the town of La Isla, located 22 kilometers from the city of Combarbalá. Thousands of pilgrims demonstrate their devotion by climbing the hill were the stone virgin is located. various interesting aspects of the Inca-Catholic mixture are present in this festivity, as in others through the north of Chile. Among these, are: payment of "mandas". which are commitments between the virgin and the pilgrim, were the virgin grants some wish, and the pilgrim pays with physical, usually painful, acts (e.g. climbing the hill on the knees). Another interesting aspect of the festivity are the "religious dances", which are Inca in origin, but nowadays represent the mixture between indigenous and Catholic beliefs. In these dances, groups of men, women and children dance in columns, dressed in non-traditional outfits (e.g. gypsies. red skins), while are followed by a band composed of different types of drums, and sometimes different kinds of flutes.

Petroglyphs

Petroglyphs were ubiquitous in the area and remain as part of the Diaguita heritage. Unfortunately, most of them were stolen by unscrupulous "private collectionists". Nowadays, despite the lack of a defined protection policy, they can be found mainly in the areas of Rincón Las Chilcas, Ramadilla and Pama. The main motivations in these carved stones are cosmology of Diaguita people and their religious ceremonies.

El Clasico

In February, Combarbala lives a unique event: El Clásico. Two of the city's sports, culture and social Clubs, "Los Loros" and "Union Juvenil", dispute the title of the city championship. Even there is no trophy or cash reward, during the whole summer, the people of Combarbalá and the visitors are divided, belonging to one of the two clubs. Although club membership is determined by family and heritage, often young people challenge their parents' affiliation, and switch clubs. At the end of February, both clubs confront each other in sport and cultural activities that decide the triumph of one of the clubs. This is decided after an exciting basketball game which usually starts after a theatrical play and a cheerleaders presentation by each club. It is not unusual that the game can start at 1 am and ends around 4 am. After the match, both winners and losers celebrate until the dawn in their respective club houses. Because of this, it is also known as "The Night Combarbalá doesn't sleep". Usually the score is only a few points difference.

Other tourist attractions

- Petrified forest, in El Algarrobal, 03 km. from the city.
- Mountain bike in Barrancas, Chineo and Fragüita, to 11 km. to the interior of the city.
- San Francisco de Borja de Combarbala Church, built in 1754. Historical monument and tourist attraction in the town center.

== Notable people ==
- Ignacio Silva Ureta (1837–1924), politician
