= Tuki =

Tuki may refer to:

== People ==
- Jessica Tuki (born 1987), New Zealand netball player
- Lynn Rapu Tuki (born 1969)
- Marta Hotus Tuki, Chilean politician
- Nabam Tuki (born 1964), Indian politician
- Valentino Riroroko Tuki (1932–2017), claimant to the Rapa Nui throne
- Tuki (singer) (born 2008), a Japanese female singer and song writer

== Places ==
- Tüki, Estonia

== Other ==
- Tuki or Ki language, spoken in Cameroon
- Solar Tuki
