= Pama =

Pama or PAMA may refer to:

== Places ==
- Pama, Austria
- Pama, Burkina Faso
- Pama Township, Tibet

== As an acronym ==
- PAMA (liqueur), a pomegranate liqueur produced in the United States
- Peel Art Gallery, Museum and Archives, public facility in Ontario, Canada
- Professional Aviation Maintenance Association
- Pulse-address multiple access, channel access method used in telecommunications networks

== People ==
- Balbir Singh Pama, Indian general and author
- Cornelis Pama (1916–1994), Dutch bookseller, publisher, heraldist and genealogist
- Pama Fou (born 1990), Australian rugby union player

== Other uses ==
- PAMA (Pakistan Automotive Manufacturers Association)
- PAMA (Prototype: Autonomous Management Agent), a giant fictional computer in Minecraft Story Mode
- Pama International, British eight-piece reggae band
- Pama Records, a UK ska and reggae label of the 1960s and 1970s
- PAMA Shopping Village, shopping center in Malta
- Pama River, in Chile
- Pama language (disambiguation)
  - Paman languages, Australian Aboriginal language family
