= 1971 Aconcagua earthquake =

Earthquake in Chile

- Location within South America
- UTC time: 1971-07-09 03:03:19
- ISC event: 782010
- USGS-ANSS: ComCat
- Local date: July 8, 1971
- Local time: 22:03 CST
- Magnitude: 7.8 M_{w}
- Depth: 58 km (36 mi)
- Epicenter: 32.54°S 71.15°W
- Type: Thrust
- Areas affected: Chile, Aconcagua and Valparaíso provinces
- Total damage: US$250 million
- Max. intensity: MMI IX (Violent)
- Tsunami: minor
- Landslides: multiple
- Casualties: 83 dead, 447 injured

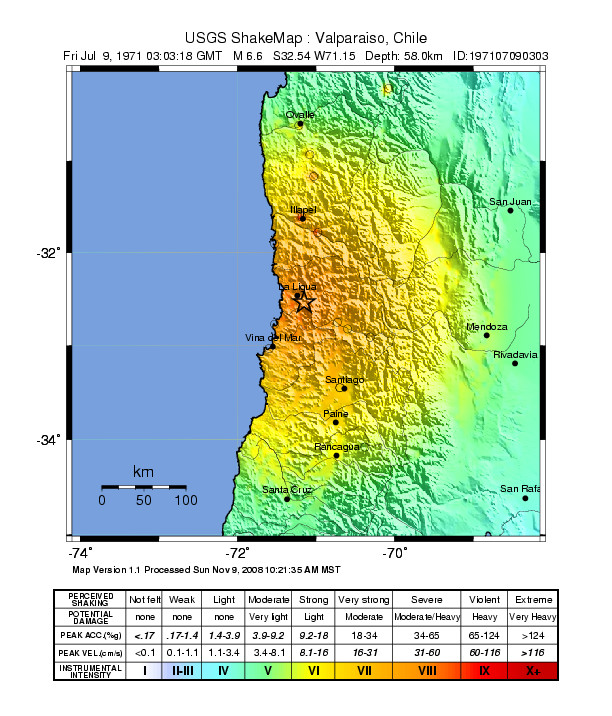
USGS ShakeMap of 1971 Earthquake in Valparaiso, Chile

The Aconcagua and Valparaíso provinces of central Chile was struck by an earthquake of magnitude 7.8 M_{w} at 22:03 8 July 1971 local time (03:03 9 July UTC). It had a maximum felt intensity of IX (violent) on the Modified Mercalli intensity scale and caused the deaths of 83 people and injured a further 447.

== Tectonic setting ==
Central Chile lies on the destructive plate boundary where the Nazca plate is being subducted beneath the South American plate. The rate of convergence at this boundary in central Chile is about 74 mm per year. The boundary has a long history of destructive earthquakes and damaging tsunamis. Events occur on the plate interface and within both the subducting slab and the over-riding plate.

== Earthquake ==
The focal mechanism and hypocentral depth of this earthquake are consistent with rupture along the plate interface. The aftershock locations spread from the epicenter westwards towards the trench.

A peak ground acceleration of 0.17 g was recorded by the only working seismometer in the area, which was 140 km distant from the epicentre.

== Damage ==
The earthquake caused widespread damage across central Chile, with the port city of Valparaíso being the most affected. A total of 83 people were killed, a further 447 were injured and 40,000 made homeless. Most of the deaths were a result of collapsed walls in buildings of adobe or unreinforced brick construction, this was even the case in areas where the shaking only reached VI MMI. Total losses were estimated as about US$250 million.

35,000 homes were either completely destroyed or damaged do badly that they had to be abandoned. 72% of schools of adobe construction were seriously damaged as were 50% of those of reinforced masonry. Only 10% of schools built using other construction methods were seriously affected. 66% of hospitals of adobe and 40% of reinforced masonry construction suffered serious damage. Of the 38 hospitals in the affected zone, there was a loss of 1,410 bed capacity out of a total of 8,273 beds in all.

Earth dams constructed for irrigation purposes were variably affected with some having serious damage. Some tailing dams in the area collapsed and one death resulted from this. The water supply to the cities of Valparaiso and Viña del Mar was seriously disrupted. The aqueduct leading from the Aconcagua River at Las Vegas was affected by cracks and fissures that took 19 days to repair. The other aqueduct from Concón and the reservoir at Peñuelas were both out of action for 2–3 days. The building that supplied the port of San Antonio and other small settlements was damaged and the supply was disrupted for two weeks. The railway from Santiago to Valparaiso was closed for ten days, mainly due to a landslip. The tunnel at Illapel was closed due to failure of the retaining walls. Several railway bridges were damaged and some embankments were affected, although these were quickly repaired.

== See also ==
- List of earthquakes in 1971
- List of earthquakes in Chile
