= Isla de Pascua Department =

Department of Chile (1966–1976)

Isla de Pascua Department Departamento de Isla de Pascua
- Department of Chile
- 1966–1976
- Flag
- Capital: Hanga Roa
- Demonym: Pascuense
- Historical era: Presidential Republic
  - Established: 1 March 1966
  - Disestablished: 1976
| Preceded by | Succeeded by |
| Valparaíso Department | Isla de Pascua Province |
- Today part of: Chile

Isla de Pascua Department, also named Easter Island Department, was one of the departments of the historical province of Valparaíso before the "regionalization" of 1974. It was named after Easter Island and comprised such territory and the Sala y Gómez island. It was effectively replaced in 1976 by the Isla de Pascua Province.

== History ==
The department was created by Law No. 16.441 by president Eduardo Frei Montalva. It became effective on 1 March 1966, when it was published in the Diario Oficial de la República de Chile. Hanga Roa was declared as the capital of the department, and would comprise the territories of Easter Island and Isla Sala y Gómez. Its only commune-subdelegation was Isla de Pascua, subdivided into three districts.

The law also indicated that the department would belong, in Chamber of Deputies elections, to the Valparaíso and Quillota departmental circunscription. As the commune was created, a municipality was named by the president, with seven members (regidores). Their term expired in May 1967. A local court was created.

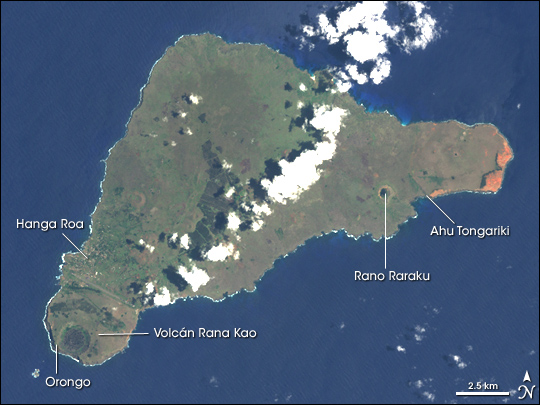
Aerial view of Easter Island

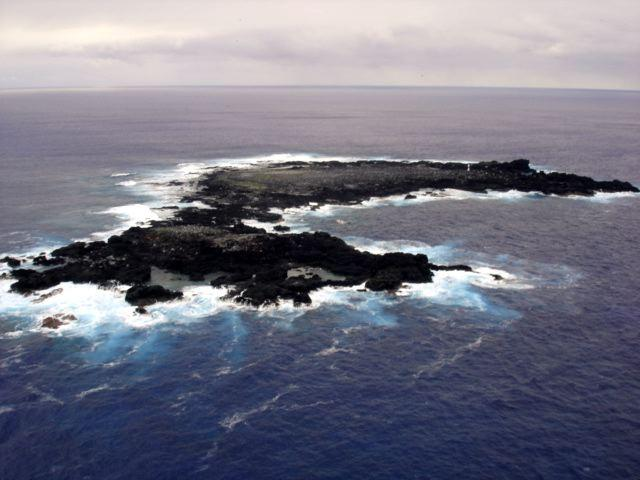
Isla Salas y Gómez is uninhabited

== Administration ==
The local administration was located in Hanga Roa, where the departmental government was located.

=== Governors ===
| Governor | Party | Term | President |
|---|---|---|---|
| Carlos Bastías Alvarado | IND | 13 September 1973 – 25 September 1973 | Augusto Pinochet |
| Omar Fuenzalida Tobar | IND | 25 September 1973 – 3 August 1974 | Augusto Pinochet |
| Giuseppe Arru Domínguez | IND | 3 August 1974 – 23 February 1975 | Augusto Pinochet |
| Arnt Arentsen Pettersen | IND | 23 February 1975 – 1 January 1976 | Augusto Pinochet |
