= La Viña Airport =

- IATA: none; ICAO: SCLV

Summary
- Airport type: Public
- Serves: Guangualí (es), Chile
- Elevation AMSL: 870 ft / 265 m
- Coordinates: 32°8′25″S 71°23′53″W

Map
- Location of La Viña Airport in Chile

Runways
Direction	Length		Surface
Direction	m	ft	Surface
17/35	500	1,640	Grass
- Source: GCM Google Maps

La Viña Airport Spanish: Aeropuerto La Viña, (ICAO: SCLV) is an airstrip serving Guangualí (es), a village in the Coquimbo Region of Chile. The airstrip sits on a bluff above the Quilimarí River valley, 11 kilometres (6.8 mi) inland from the Pacific coast.

There is rising terrain to the south, and a dropoff into the river valley to the north.

== See also ==
- Transport in Chile
- List of airports in Chile
