= Pedro Edmunds Paoa =

Chilean politician

Pedro Pablo Edmunds Paoa
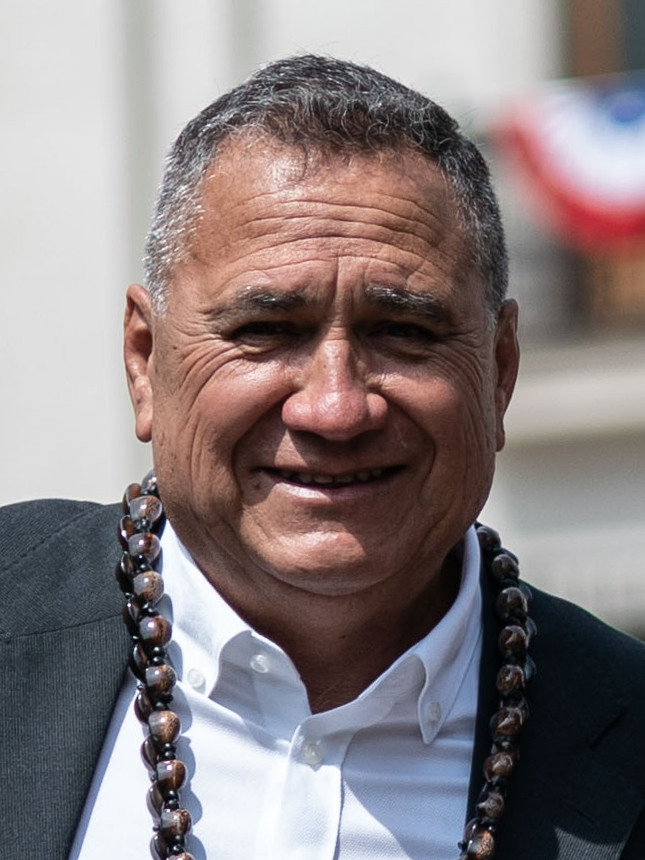

Mayor of Rapa Nui
- Incumbent
- Assumed office 6 December 2012
- Preceded by: Luz Zasso Paoa
- In office 1994 – 6 December 2008
- Preceded by: Alberto Hotus Chávez
- Succeeded by: Luz Zasso Paoa

Governor of Isla de Pascua Province (Rapa Nui)
- In office March 2010 – August 2010
- Preceded by: Melania Carolina Hotu Hey
- Succeeded by: Carmen Cardinali Paoa

Personal details
- Born: 1 July 1961 (age 64) Easter Island, Chile
- Party: Progressive Party
- Profession: Politician

Pedro Pablo Petero Edmunds Paoa (born 1 July 1961) is a Chilean politician. He serves as mayor of Rapa Nui (Easter Island) Commune. He was previously the Governor of the Isla de Pascua Province from March 2010 to August 2010.

His first term as mayor of Easter Island was between 1994 and 2008, and he was member of the Christian Democratic Party. Currently he is member of the Progressive Party.

He is a supporter of the island autonomy from Valparaíso region, saying this would allow islanders to handle the problems locally rather than rely on an official "more than 4000 kilometers and you do not know the island".

== Secession from Chile ==
His appointment as Easter Island governor sparked protests from indigenous Polynesians on the island, who feared he planned land deals. In response the "Rapa Nui Parliament", a group of indigenous Polynesians, occupied government buildings, demanded Paoa's resignation and wrote to the Pacific Islands Forum saying they wanted to 'secede from Chile'. Edmunds resigned from office in early August 2010. He was temporarily replaced by Jorge Miranda, a lawyer, as interim governor following his resignation. Edmunds' permanent successor, Carmen Cardinali, was appointed Governor in September 2010.

In 2015, being the mayor of Easter Island at the time, Paoa once again ran into problems with the Rapa Nui Parliament when they took control over the island and its archaeology. The situation still hasn't been solved. Following his reelection and the election of Tiare Aguilera Hey to the Chilean Constitutional Convention, he boasted the high civic education present on Rapa Nui.
