= Ignacio Silva Ureta =

Chilean farmer and politician (1837–1924)

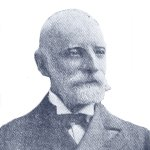

Member of the Senate
- In office 1897–1915
- Constituency: Aconcagua Province

Member of the Chamber of Deputies
- In office 1894–1897
- Constituency: Petorca and La Ligua

Member of the Constituent Congress
- In office 15 April 1891 – 18 August 1891
- Constituency: Petorca

Personal details
- Born: 2 July 1837 Combarbalá, Chile
- Died: 16 March 1924 (aged 86) Santiago, Chile
- Party: Liberal Democratic Party
- Spouse: Josefina Somarriva Berganza
- Children: 10
- Parent(s): Ignacio Silva Cabanillas; Josefa Ureta Brayer
- Education: Instituto Nacional
- Profession: Farmer

Ignacio Silva Ureta (2 July 1837 – 16 March 1924) was a Chilean farmer and politician who served as a member of the Chamber of Deputies of Chile and as a senator for Aconcagua Province.

A supporter of President José Manuel Balmaceda and a member of the Liberal Democratic Party, Silva represented Petorca in the Constituent Congress of 1891 and Petorca and La Ligua in the Chamber of Deputies before serving as senator for Aconcagua for eighteen years.

== Early life ==
Silva was born in Combarbalá on 2 July 1837 to Ignacio Silva Cabanillas and Josefa Ureta Brayer. He studied at the Instituto Nacional, completing his studies in 1850.

In 1856, he began working in agriculture on family properties in Coquimbo Province. He also developed leased agricultural properties before moving in 1875 to his Alicahue estate in the department of Petorca.

Silva married Josefina Somarriva Berganza in Santiago on 29 May 1870. They had ten children. He was also a member of the Sociedad Nacional de Agricultura.

== Political career ==
A supporter and political ally of President José Manuel Balmaceda, Silva became a member of the Liberal Democratic Party.

During the 1891 Chilean Civil War, he was elected deputy for Petorca to the Constituent Congress, serving from 15 April to 18 August 1891.

Silva returned to Congress after being elected deputy for Petorca and La Ligua for the 1894–1897 parliamentary period. He served as a member of the permanent committee for ecclesiastical affairs.

In 1897, Silva was elected to the Senate for Aconcagua Province for the 1897–1903 term. He served on the permanent committees for war and navy and for budgets.

He was reelected senator for Aconcagua for the 1903–1909 parliamentary period. On 15 November 1905, he became vice president of the Senate. During this term, he served as a substitute member of the permanent committee for constitution, legislation and justice and as a member of the permanent committee for industry and public works.

Silva was reelected for a third consecutive senatorial term for Aconcagua for the 1909–1915 period. He again served on the permanent committee for war and navy and continued as a member of the committee for industry and public works.

During his parliamentary career, Silva promoted public works in Aconcagua and neighboring areas. These included the railways from Calera to Cabildo and from Los Vilos to Illapel and Salamanca, the Gurupa tunnel and improvements to the port of Los Vilos. He also supported the provision of drinking water to San Felipe and Los Andes and advocated the construction of the San Felipe–Putaendo railway.

Silva also supported educational initiatives, including the establishment of secondary schools in San Felipe and Los Andes, and introduced a proposal to increase the salaries of primary-school teachers.

He died in Santiago on 16 March 1924, aged 86.
