= Vacas (disambiguation) =

Vacas is a 1991 Spanish film.

Vacas may also refer to:

- Vacas, Villalba, Puerto Rico, a barrio
- Vacas Municipality, a municipality of Bolivia
- Vacas, Cochabamba, a Bolivian village
- Vacas Heladas River, a river in Chile

== See also ==
- Vaca (disambiguation)
