= Laura Rapu =

Chilean politician

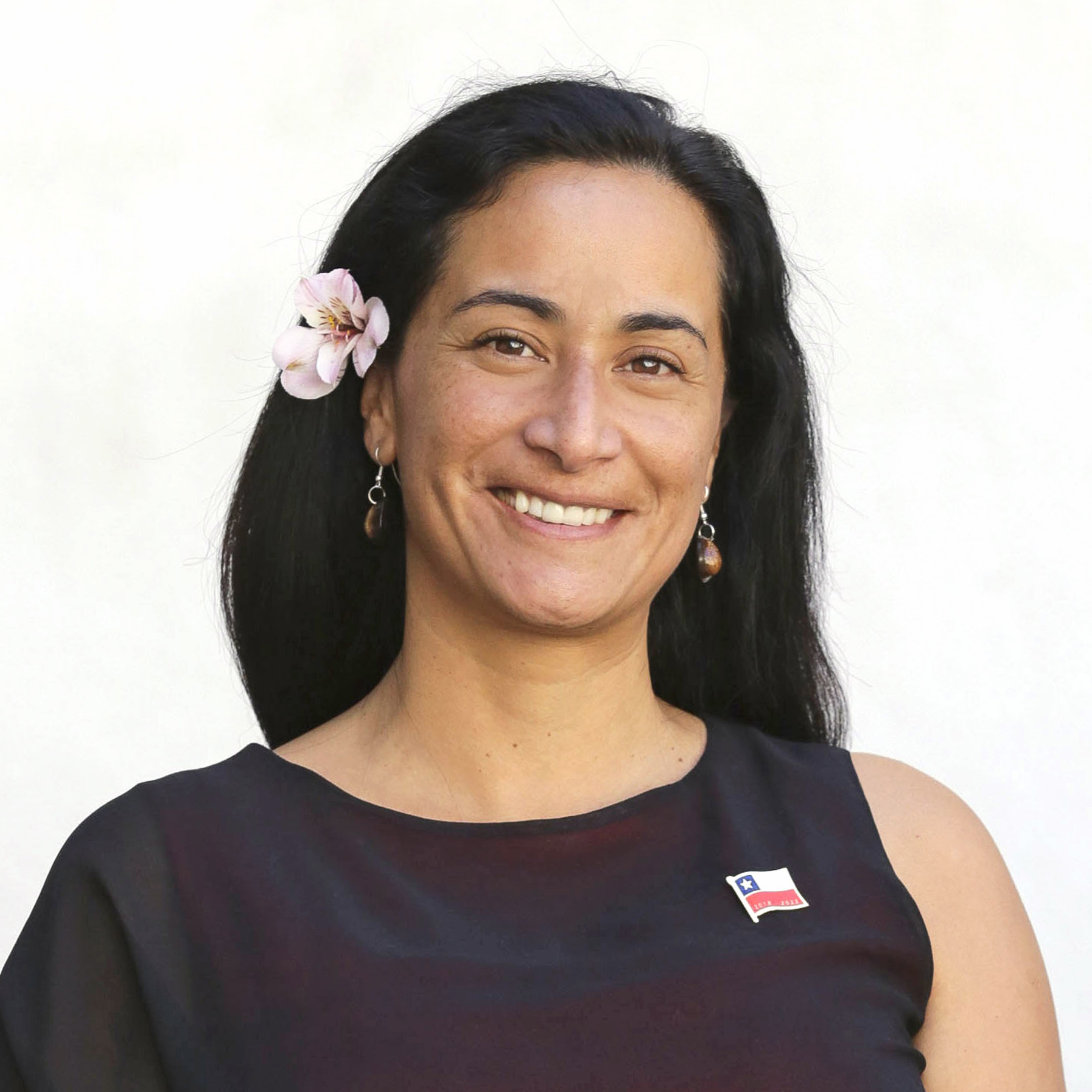
- Rapu in 2018.

Governor of Isla de Pascua Province (Rapa Nui)
- In office 16 March 2018 – 29 April 2021
- President: Sebastián Piñera
- Preceded by: Melania Hotu
- Succeeded by: René de la Puente

Personal details
- Born: Laura Tarita Alarcón Rapu; 2 March 1977 (age 49) Easter Island, Chile
- Party: Independent
- Relations: Lynn Rapu Tuki (uncle)
- Profession: Politician and anthropologist

Laura Tarita Rapu Alarcón (born Laura Tarita Alarcón Rapu, 2 March 1977) is a Rapa Nui Chilean politician who served as governor of Isla de Pascua Province from 2018 until her resignation in April 2021.

== Biography ==
She was born in Easter Island in 1977 to parents Arturo Orando Alarcón Espinoza and María Hortencia Rapu Tuki. Her cousin, Camilo Rapu Riroroko, is President of the Ma'u Henua Indigenous Community and her uncle, Lynn Rapu Tuki, is head-teacher and founder of the Ma'aranui Cultural Academy.

Laura Rapu, then known as Laura Alarcón Rapu, gained fame during the late 1980s in Chilean media, when she sang her original song "Iorana Presidente" (Hello President), which had both Spanish and Rapa Nui lyrics, during a visit from military dictator Augusto Pinochet, which was later used an anthem for the pro-Pinochet campaign of the 1988 Chilean national plebiscite. Later on, she stated that she does not sympathize to Pinochet's government or policies and was simply honoring the visit from a president, as the island did not usually get such important visitors.

She earned a degree in anthropology and until 2018 was member of the Valparaíso Region Council for the Isla de Pascua Province during two tenures. On 5 March 2018, being a defender of Rapa Nui traditions, culture, heritage and language, she was appointed by President Sebastián Piñera as the new governor of the Island, succeeding Melania Hotu. She worked in the Te Hokinga Mai project, consisting of the return of local heritage that was abroad.

Following Spanish naming customs, at birth her paternal surname was Alarcón (of Spanish origin) and her maternal surname was Rapu (of Polynesian Rapa Nui origin). However, she has since legally changed the order of her surnames for more emphasis on her Rapa Nui ancestry.
