= Isla de Pascua Province =

Coordinates: 27°08′S 109°25′W

Isla de Pascua Province Provincia de Isla de Pascua
- Province
- Seal

- Location in the Valparaíso Region

- Location in Chile
- Country: Chile
- Region: Valparaíso
- Creation: 1976
- Capital: Hanga Roa
- Communes: List of 1: Isla de Pascua

Government
  - Type: Provincial
  - Presidential Provincial Delegate: Mai Teao Osorio

Area
  - Total: 163.6 km^{2} (63.2 sq mi)

Population (2024 census)
  - Total: 4,800
  - Density: 29/km^{2} (76/sq mi)

Sex
  - Men: 2,351
  - Women: 2,449
- Time zone: UTC-6 (EAST)
  - Summer (DST): UTC-5 (EASST)
- Area codes: +56-32
- Website: Presidential Provincial Delegation of Isla de Pascua

Isla de Pascua Province (Easter Island Province) is a Chilean province, an administrative division located within the Valparaíso Region. It has a 163.6 km² area and a population of 4800 inhabitants. The provincial capital is Hanga Roa. Besides Easter Island, the province comprises the small and uninhabited Isla Salas y Gómez, located hundreds of kilometers east of Easter Island. It is the only Chilean province located in Oceania and has a "special regime" status, with similar attributions to regional governments. It was created in 1976, replacing the former Isla de Pascua Department.

== Communes ==
The province includes only one commune: Isla de Pascua.

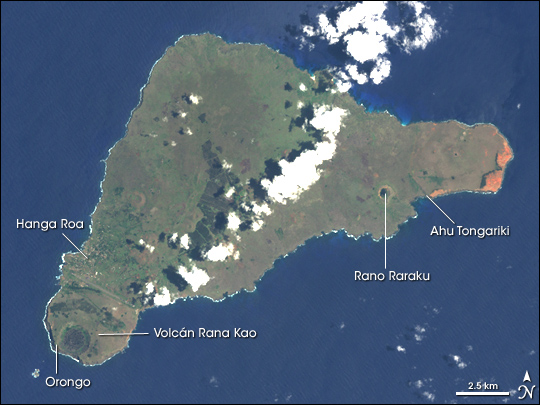
Aerial view of Easter Island

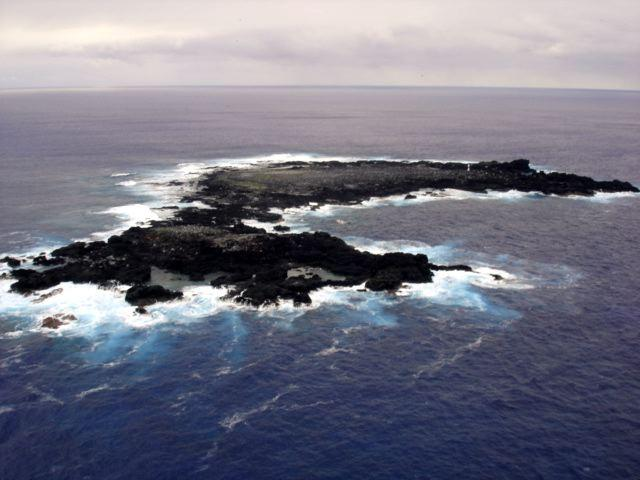
Isla Salas y Gómez is uninhabited

== Authorities ==
=== Province governor (1976–2021) ===
Governor	Party	Term	President
Arnt Arentsen Pettersen	Ind.	1 January 1976 – 16 February 1979	Augusto Pinochet
Ariel González Cornejo	Ind.	16 February 1979 – 27 January 1984	Augusto Pinochet
Sergio Alejo Rapu Haoa	Ind.	27 January 1984 – 11 March 1990	Augusto Pinochet
Jacobo Hey Paoa	Ind.	11 March 1990 – 11 March 1994	Patricio Aylwin
Jacobo Hey Paoa	Ind.	11 March 1994 – 11 March 2000	Eduardo Frei Ruíz-Tagle
Jacobo Hey Paoa	PDC	11 March 2000 – 1 September 2000	Ricardo Lagos
Enrique Pakarati Ika	PDC	1 September 2000 – 11 March 2006	Ricardo Lagos
Melania Hotu Hey	PDC	11 March 2006 – 11 March 2010	Michelle Bachelet
Pedro Edmunds Paoa	PDC	17 March 2010 – 9 August 2010	Sebastián Piñera
Carmen Cardinali Paoa	Ind.	6 September 2010 – 11 March 2014	Sebastián Piñera
Marta Hotus Tuki	PDC	11 March 2014 – 8 September 2015	Michelle Bachelet
Melania Hotu Hey	PDC	9 September 2015 – 11 March 2018	Michelle Bachelet
Laura Tarita Alarcón Rapu	Ind.	11 March 2018 – 22 March 2021	Sebastián Piñera
René de la Puente Hey	Ind.	29 April 2021 – 14 July 2021	Sebastián Piñera

=== Presidential provincial delegate (2021–present) ===
Delegate	Party	Term	President
René de la Puente Hey	Ind.	14 July 2021 – 11 March 2022	Sebastián Piñera
Juliette Hotus Paoa	Ind.	11 March 2022 – 2 December 2023	Gabriel Boric
Sergio Tepano Cuevas	Ind.	2 December 2023 – 10 March 2026	Gabriel Boric
Mai Teao Osorio	RN	16 March 2026 – present	José Antonio Kast

== See also ==
- Isla de Pascua Department
