= Cogoti La Pelicana Airport =

Airstrip in Chile

La Pelicana Airport
- IATA: none; ICAO: SCCG

Summary
- Airport type: Private
- Serves: Combarbalá
- Elevation AMSL: 2,790 ft / 850 m
- Coordinates: 31°04′02″S 70°57′20″W

Map
- Location of La Pelicana Airport in Chile

Runways
Direction	Length		Surface
Direction	m	ft	Surface
10/28	600	1,969	Dirt
- Source: Landings.com Google Maps GCM

La Pelicana Airport (Spanish: Aeropuerto de La Pelicana, (ICAO: SCCG)) is an airstrip serving Combarbalá, a small town in the Coquimbo Region of Chile. The airstrip is 13 kilometres (8.1 mi) north of Combarbalá, in a river valley near the hamlet of Cogoti.

There is mountainous terrain in all quadrants, nearby rising terrain to the north.

== See also ==
- Transport in Chile
- List of airports in Chile
