= Mostazal River =

River in Chile

Location
- Country: Chile

Physical characteristics
- Mouth
  - location: Molles River

The Mostazal River is a river in the Coquimbo Region in Chile. It flows from east to west and changes its name to Rapel River (Coquimbo) which flows into the Embalse La Paloma.

== See also ==
- List of rivers of Chile
