= Luz Zasso Paoa =

Chilean politician (born 1972)

Mayor of Easter Island
- In office 6 December 2008 – 6 December 2012
- President: Michelle Bachelet; Sebastián Piñera
- Preceded by: Pedro Edmunds Paoa
- Succeeded by: Pedro Edmunds Paoa

Personal details
- Born: 16 May 1972 (age 53); Easter Island, Chile

Luz del Carmen Zasso Paoa (born 16 May 1972) is a Chilean engineer and politician who served as the mayor of Easter Island from 2008 to 2012, as a member of the Christian Democratic Party. She was the first woman elected to the office and is the general manager of Agrícola y Servicios Isla de Pascua, the largest company on the island.

== Early life and education ==
Luz Zasso was born in Easter Island to parents Ambrosio Guillermo Zasso Leiva and María Raquel Paoa Huki. Her father was of Genoese descent while her mother was a Rapa Nui. She attended elementary school on Easter Island, high school on the mainland in Valparaíso, and graduated from Viña del Mar University with a degree in construction.

== Career ==
Zasso served as the mayor of Easter Island and is a member of the Christian Democratic Party. She was the second woman to hold the position and first woman elected to it. The Special Visitors Card for visitors to Eastern Island was implemented during her tenure. In 2013, she stated that she did not plan on appealing to the International Court of Justice for independence.

Agrícola y Servicios Isla de Pascua, the state owned company that provides electricity, water, and loading services to Easter Island, was managed by Paoa and Yuriko Westermeier Tuki. She became the general manager of the company in 2015. It is the largest company on the island with over 100 employees and has an annual budget of $9 billion. Her first cousins, Claudia Fernández Paoa and Marcos Astete Paoa, were appointed as directors of the company.

== Works cited ==
- "Boric nombró como directores de empresa estatal de Isla de Pascua a autoridades municipales y parientes de la gerenta general". El Líbero. 7 June 2022. Archived from the original on 20 June 2025.
- "Ex alcaldesa descartó que Isla de Pascua quiera recurrir a La Haya". Cooperativa. 16 January 2013. Archived from the original on 20 June 2025.
- "Sasipa, la empresa pública de Isla de Pascua, aumentó por cuatro sus pérdidas". DF MAS. 19 April 2024. Archived from the original on 20 June 2025.
- ""Somos respetuosas, pero no sumisas"". El Mercurio. 29 January 2009. Archived from the original on 20 June 2025.
- Bustamante, Rodrigo (16 September 2009). "La Isla de Pascua identifica a sus turistas". BBC. Archived from the original on 20 June 2025.
