= Carmen Cardinali =

Chilean politician (born 1944)

Carmen Cardinali Paoa

Governor of Isla de Pascua Province (Rapa Nui)
- In office September 2010 – March 2014
- Preceded by: Pedro Edmunds Paoa
- Succeeded by: Marta Raquel Hotus Tuki

Personal details
- Born: 21 June 1944 (age 82) Easter Island, Chile
- Profession: Professor tourism industry

Carmen Cardinali Paoa (born 21 June 1944) is a Chilean professor. She served as the governor of Isla de Pascua Province (Rapa Nui) in the government of president Sebastián Piñera, between 2010 and 2014.

A native of the island, Cardinali has worked as a professor in Santiago and also in Easter Island's tourism industry.

Cardinali's predecessor, former Governor Pedro Edmunds Paoa, resigned in early August 2010 following the occupation of six buildings by protesters who demanded the return of land to the descendants of the island's indigenous Polynesian inhabitants. Lawyer Jorge Miranda was appointed as interim Governor until a replacement could be found.

Chilean deputy Interior Minister Rodrigo Ubilla appointed Carmen Cardinali as Governor of Easter Island in early September 2010 to replace Edmunds. Cardinali's challenges included archeological preservation of the island's heritage and revamping the tourist industry. She served as a Governor until March 2014, being replaced by Marta Raquel Hotus Tuki, appointed by president Michelle Bachelet.
