= Tiare Aguilera Hey =

Chilean lawyer, politician (born 1982)

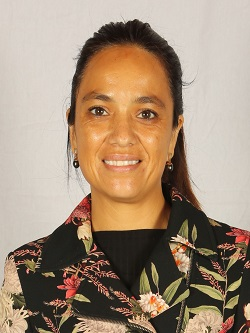

Member of the Constitutional Convention of Chile
- In office July 4, 2021 – July 4, 2022
- Preceded by: office established
- Succeeded by: office abolished
- Constituency: Rapa Nui at-large

Personal details
- Born: Tiare Maeva Carolina Aguilera Hey; 13 February 1982 (age 44) Easter Island, Chile
- Education: Andrés Bello National University; University of Wuhan
- Occupation: Lawyer

Tiare Maeva Carolina Aguilera Hey (born 13 February 1982) is a Rapa Nui attorney and politician. In 2021, she was elected to represent the Rapa Nui people in the Chilean Constitutional Convention.

== Early life and legal career ==
Tiare Aguilera was born and raised on the island of Rapa Nui. She studied at Andrés Bello National University, where she received her degree in law. Aguilera later attended the University of Wuhan, where she received a master's degree in international public law. Aguilera explained that her decision to study in China as opposed to Chile was due to several reasons, including her Rapa Nui background, the "distinct" Chinese culture and the fact that all Polynesian migrations came from Taiwan. Further stating that the "western gaze ignores the eastern gaze and we as Rapa Nui are closer to the east". In addition to Rapa Nui, mainland Chile, and China, Aguilera has lived in Spain, New Zealand, and Hawaii.

After returning to Rapa Nui in 2013, Aguilera became an advisor to the Comisión de Desarrollo de la Isla de Pascua (English: "Easter Island Development Commission"), an indigenous decision-making body. By 2016, she was intimately involved in local politics, organizing political events for Governor Melania Hotu. During her legal career, she specialized in urban planning law.

== Political career ==
Following a contested primary, Aguilera was chosen as the candidate of the Rapa Nui for a reserved seat in the Chilean Constitutional Convention, and was later formally elected to the position. Political commentators speculated that she could potentially prove a key swing vote in the body following reports that the centre-right Chile Vamos coalition was courting her support for certain legislative measures.

An experiment in comparative law, Aguilera has stated her demand that the new constitution respects the terms and conditions of the 1888 annexation treaty between Chile and Rapa Nui. The preservation of the Rapa Nui language has been identified by Aguilera as an issue she plans to champion in the Constitutional Assembly. She expressed concerns that the language is at risk of extinction.

Aguilera favors the establishment of a plurinational state in Chile in the interest of determination for indigenous Chileans. She has argued in favor of forming an alliance between indigenous politicians in the Constitutional Convention. A proponent of decentralization, Aguilera has argued in favor of indigenous autonomy from an environmental perspective, stating:

The new constitution must think of territories as ecosystems. The island is already a small, limited territory, but the relationship that the Polynesian people have with the sea is different and we are going to contribute to that

On economic policy, Aguilera favors increased state intervention and the creation of a generous welfare state in Chile. She argued that the disparities in quality of infrastructure and healthcare between mainland Chile and Rapa Nui meant that the government should have "a much more participatory role" in economic affairs. During her campaign, she endorsed enshrining a right to housing and a right to water in the new constitution.

In local politics, Aguilera has praised efforts to expand Rapa Nui's rainwater harvesting system, noting that such initiatives are necessary given the island's diminishing water supply. She has emphasized the need to protect the marine parks present on Rapa Nui.
