= Cruz del Sur =

Cruz del Sur ("Southern Cross") may refer to:

- Cruz del Sur pipeline, gas pipeline between Argentina and Uruguay
- Cruz del Sur de Bariloche, Argentine football club
- Cruz del Sur Music, Italian record label.
- Cruz del Sur, fictional prison in Locked Up (TV series)
- Cruz del Sur, expansion pack to the computer game Uncharted Waters Online
- Cruz del Sur Incident, see List of incidents during the Beagle conflict
