= Melania Hotu =

Rapa Nui Chilean politician

Melania Carolina Hotu Heya
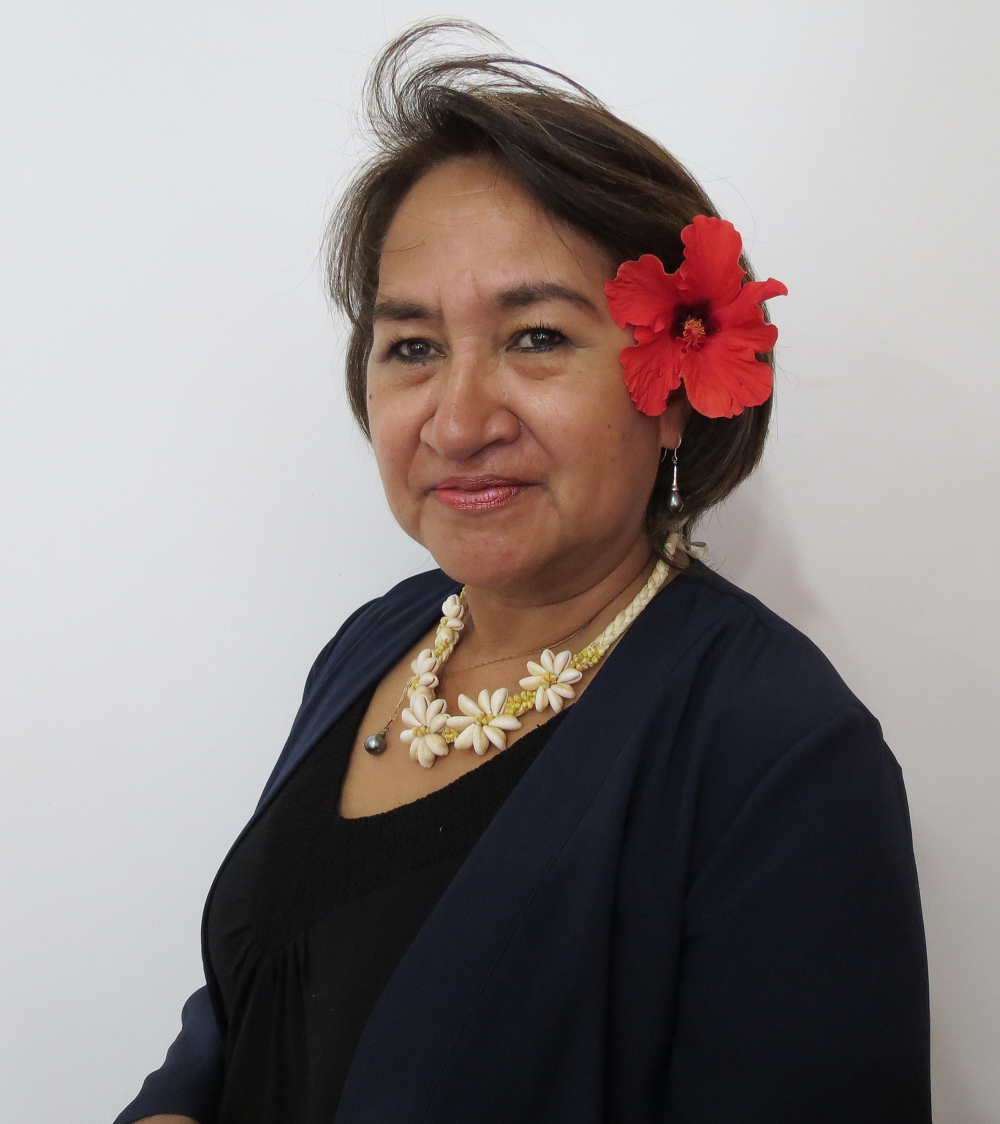

Governor of Isla de Pascua Province (Rapa Nui)
- In office 9 September 2015 – 11 March 2018
- President: Michelle Bachelet Jeria
- Preceded by: Marta Raquel Hotus Tuki
- Succeeded by: Laura Alarcón Rapu
- In office 11 March 2006 – 16 March 2010
- President: Michelle Bachelet Jeria
- Preceded by: Enrique Pakarati Ika
- Succeeded by: Pedro Pablo Edmunds Paoa

Personal details
- Born: 8 February 1959 (age 67) Santiago, Chile
- Profession: Politician

Melania Carolina Hotu Hey (born 8 February 1959) is a Rapa Nui Chilean politician. She has served as the provincial governor of Isla de Pascua Province (Easter Island, known locally as Rapa Nui), in Chilean Polynesia, in the first and second governments of Michelle Bachelet.

== Political career ==
She was appointed on March 11, 2006 by newly elected Chilean President Michelle Bachelet Jeria as part of the President's undertaking to increase female representation in governmental positions. Before beginning her term as local governor (suerekao), Hotu Hey directed a program for Rapa Nui youth.

Significant issues facing Easter Island during her term included Chilean immigration, loss of culture, and political reform aimed at providing greater autonomy. Tensions over similar issues led to the resignation of Governor Pedro Edmunds Paoa, Hotu Hey's predecessor, in 2010.

In September 2015 she was appointed governor of Easter Island for the second time office she held until 16 March 2018.
