= Lynn Rapu =

Chilean Rapa Nui arts and traditions promoter (born 1969)

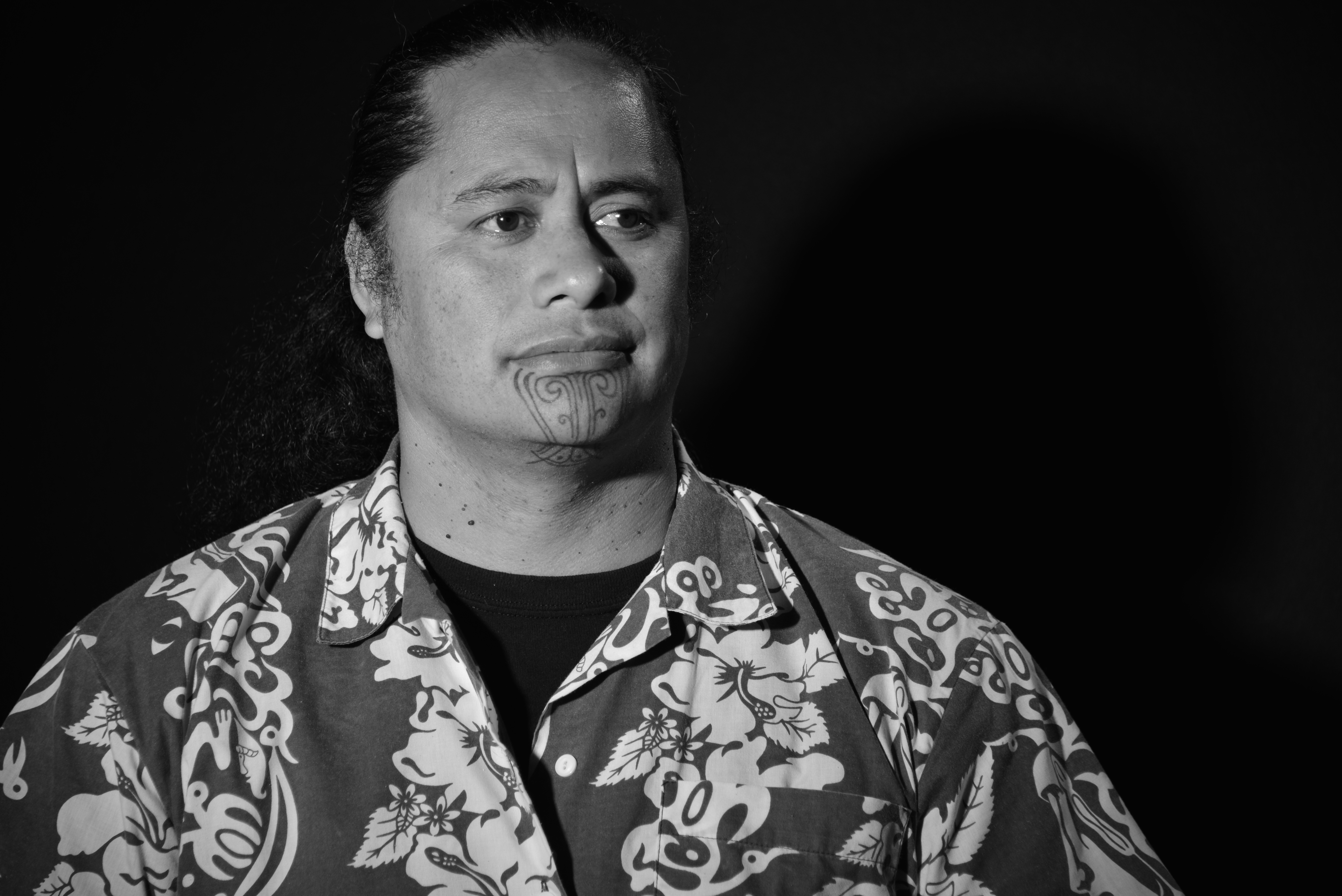
- Born: Lynn Jaime Rapu Tuki; 9 December 1969 (age 56); Easter Island, Chile
- Occupation: Teacher
- Spouse: Maima Tching Chi Yen (m. 2014)
- Children: 2
- Relatives: Laura Rapu (niece)

Lynn Jaime Rapu Tuki (born 9 December 1969) is a Chilean promoter of the arts and traditions of the Rapa Nui People and head-teacher and founder of the Ma'aranui Cultural Academy and the Cultural Ballet Kari Kari. He is Cultural Ambassador of Asia-Pacific and has been Head of the Liaison Office of the National Council of Culture and the Arts (CNCA, Consejo Nacional de la Cultura y las Artes, in Spanish).

== Biography ==
Lynn Rapu was born on Easter Island in 1969, son of Belisario Rapu Ure Ngorongoro and Ana Lola Tuki Teave. His niece, Laura Rapu, is an Easter Island politician. He is part of a generation that, compared to their elders, grew up with much more freedom and access to income produced by touristic activity.

In 2014, he married Chinese-born anthropologist Maima Tching Chi Yen, worker of the Rapa Nui Ao Tupuna foundation. They have two children together, Hopumanu and Analola.

With the passing of his father in 1977 while his mother was abroad, Lynn and his siblings were sent to live in a local Children's Home for 5 years. During this period, his cultural education was strongly associated with people like Papiano Ika – who lived in "La Colonia" Sanatorium, for people with Hansen's disease – Luis Pate Paoa (known as Kiko Pate) and Ricardo Hito.

At age 15, he began his career as a performer in a dance troupe formed by his brother Marcos Rapu, called Arangi Moana, mainly in the musical part executing instruments like the ukulele and percussion. Later in 1992, enters another group called Pokutangi as a musician and dancer for 4 years; it is in this experience when he decides to renounce the troupe and establish an academy focused on transmitting the essence of culture through discipline.

== Contributions ==
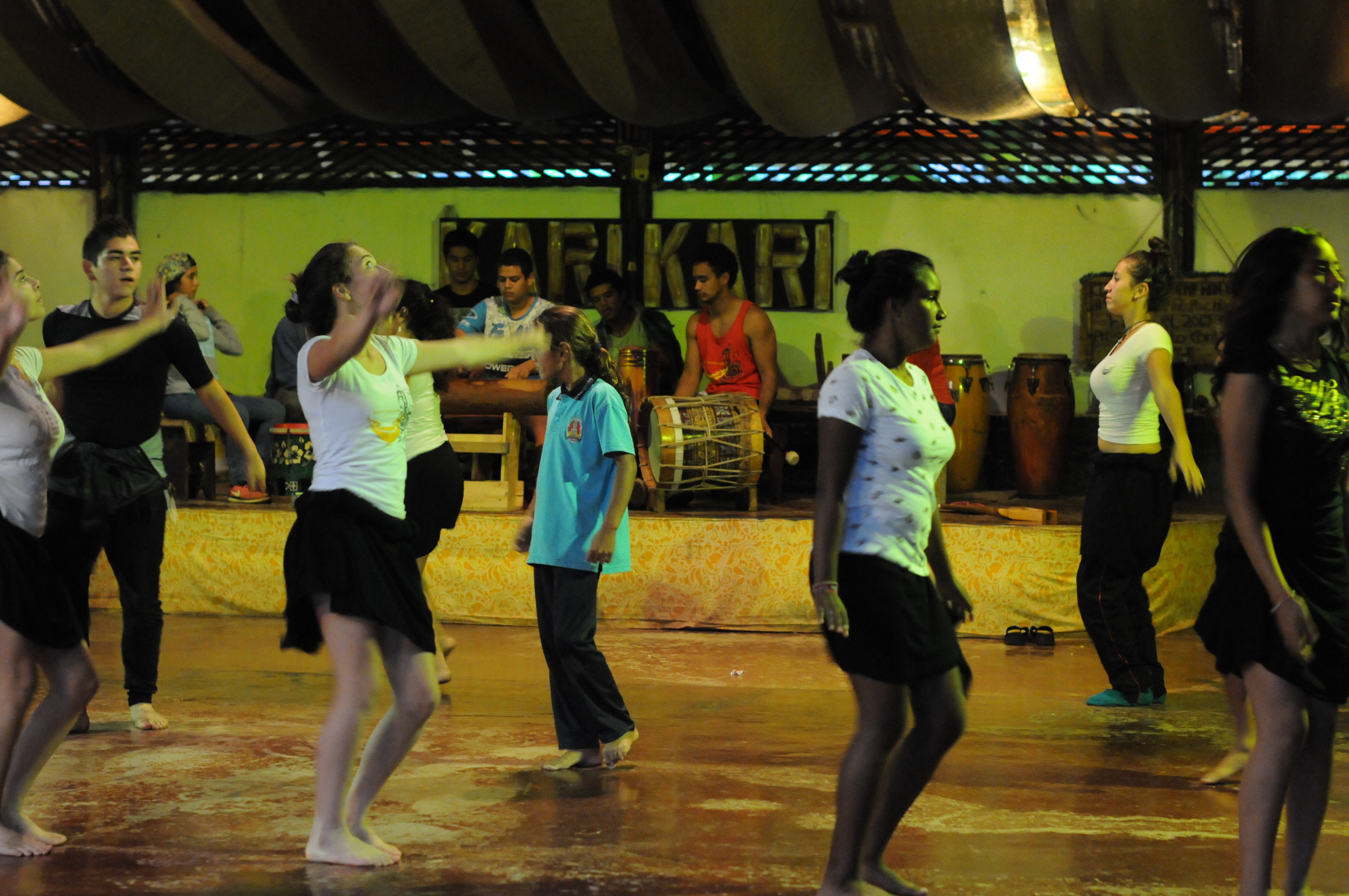
Cultural Academy Ma'aranui

=== Ma'aranui Academy and the Cultural Ballet Kari Kari ===
Created the cultural academy back in 1996, where he teaches free classes in music, dance, native language, ancestral navigation principles, customs and crafts of Rapa Nui. It has formed recognized artist of the ethnic group, winners of the Tapati Rapa Nui festival and participants of various folkloric troupes. In the same year the Cultural Ballet Kari Kari is founded, a traditional troupe with a long history in the island and with international presence.

=== Representative ===
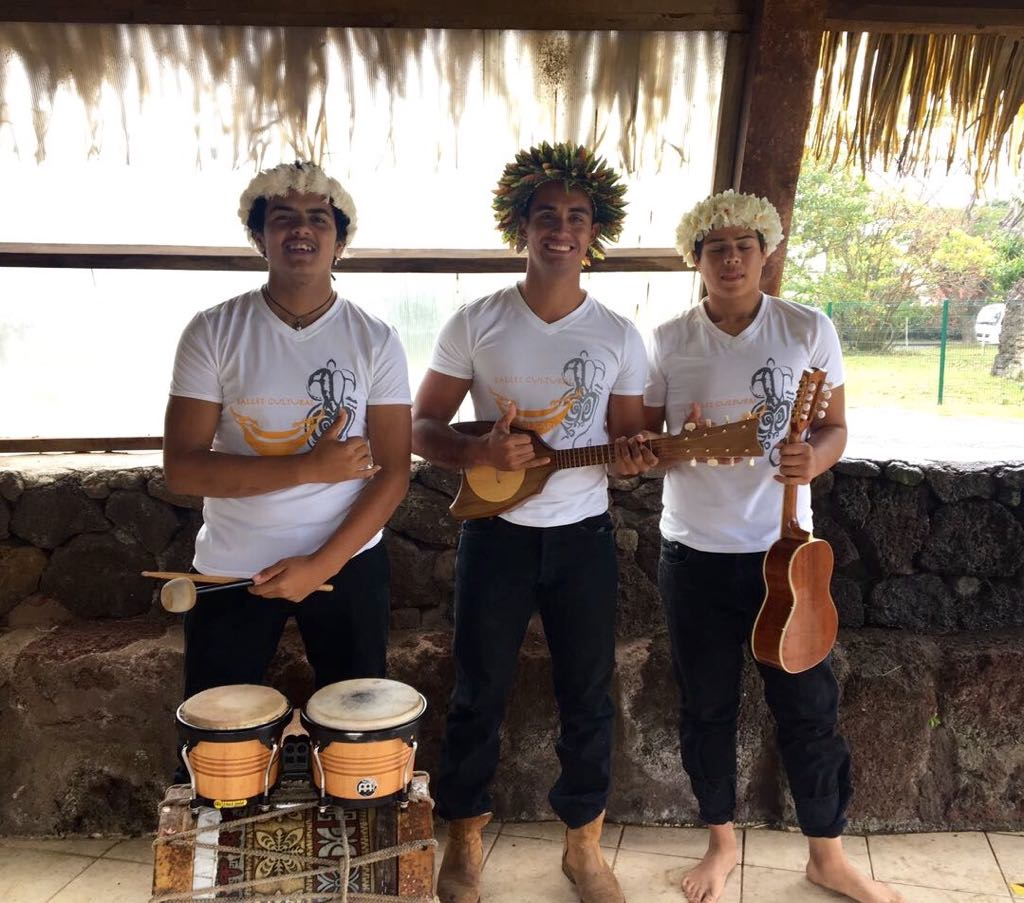
Musicians from the Academy in a social event

Because of his knowledge on culture and ancient customs, Lynn usually represents and directs social and cultural events such as: wakes, church songs, family gatherings, social parties, receptions, among others. Some of the most important activities where he has been in charge are the reception of Polynesian double hulled canoes such as Hokule'a in 2017, cultural exchanges abroad and winner for 17 consecutive years as a director of dance troupes for the Tapati Rapa Nui festival

=== Other projects ===
In 1998, while running the Academy and the dance troupe, he began teaching Culture Courses in the local school Lorenzo Baeza Vega. He usually taught these classes outside the classroom. This course included Rapa Nui Language, traditional fishing, and music, amongst others. He stopped giving this class in school in 2004.

In 2011, he was named Cultural Ambassador of the Asia-Pacific, and was legal representative of the Rapa Nui Culture abroad. While he carried out his functions, he gave the opportunity to various music and dance troupes from the island to take part in several cultural exchanges throughout Polynesia and was able to get young Rapanui people to participate as crew members of Polynesian canoes such as Vaka Fa'afaite and Te Aurere. He took part in the Forum: “Reflexiones desde la Experiencia Maori” (“Thoughts from the Maori Experience”) in the Universidad de Chile. Later on, in 2016-2017, he was named Head of the Liaison Office in the Consejo Nacional de la Cultura y las Artes, on Easter Island.

== Debut ==
Even though the Ma’aranui Academy was created in 1996, it was not until 1997 that the Cultural Ballet Kari Kari gave their first performance as a troupe. This first performance took place in Hotel Iorana, on Rapa Nui. It was not long until they began touring outside the island. Their most outstanding performances so far have been (in chronological order):

Year	Country	Description
1998	Spain	Tourism promotion strategy
1998	Portugal	Tourism promotion strategy
2003	Marquesas Islands	Festival
2004	Republic of Palau	Festival of Pacific Arts
2004	New Zealand	Cultural Exchange
2008	China, South Korea, Vietnam	Asian Cultural Exchange
2011	Tahiti	Heiva Festival
2011	Marquesas Islands	Marquesas Islands Festival
2012	Solomon Islands	Festival of the Pacific Arts
2013	France	Tourism promotion strategy
2014	Marquesas Islands	Festival of the Polynesian Islands
2015	Santiago, Chile	Maori and Rapanui Cultural Exchange. GAM
2016	Guam	Festival of the Pacific Arts

== Discography ==
The Cultural Ballet Kari Kari have their own discography, which comprises different ancient songs.

Year	Album
1998	Kari Kari
2000	Kuhane O Te Kari Kari
2000	Ariki Takona
2008	Ate Ara Taumana

== Certificates ==
Year	Mention	Issuing Entity
2012	Cultural Delegate in Rapa Nui	Corporación Municipal de Isla de Pascua
2014	Main cultural promoter of the Rapa Nui ethnic group	Corporación Municipal de Isla de Pascua
2015	Recognition as Cultural Ambassador	Gobernación Provincial
2017	Recognition to the Ma'aranui Academy for its 20 years of service to the community	Corporación Nacional de Desarrollo Indígena
2017	Certificate for winning the Tapati Rapa Nui Festival for 17 consecutive year	Dirección General Tapati Rapa Nui

== Bibliography ==
- Campbell, R. (2015). La Herencia Musical de Rapa Nui. Rapanui Press.
