= Estero Camisas =

Coordinates: 31°46′S 71°06′W

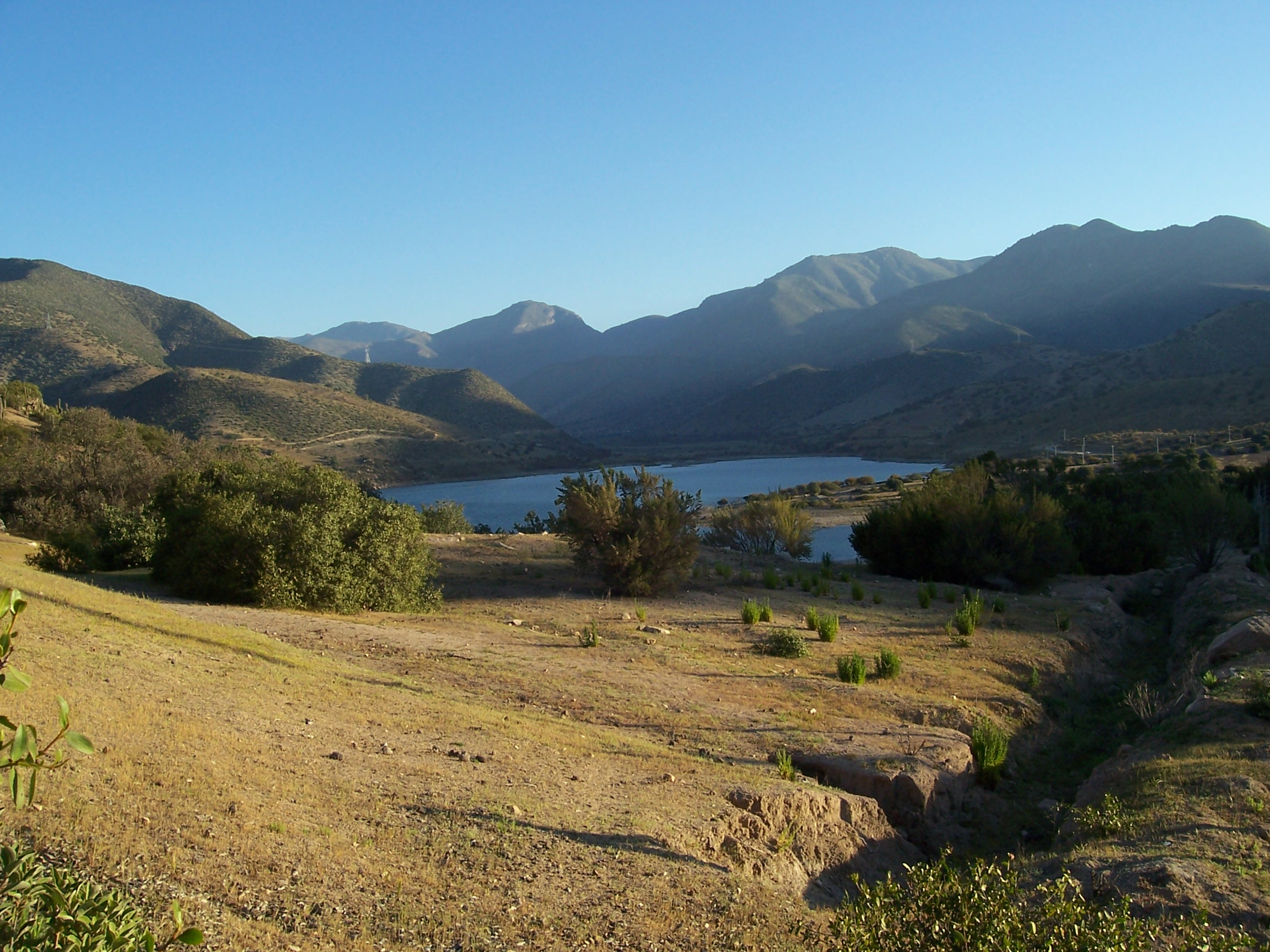

Location
- Country: Chile

The Estero Camisas is a river of Chile.

== See also ==
- List of rivers of Chile
