= Pama language =

Pama language may refer to:

- One of the Paman languages
- Pamainá language, a variety of Karipuná
- Pama language (Arawa), a dialect of Jamamadí

== See also ==
- Pama–Nyungan languages
