= Estero Punitaqui =

Coordinates: 30°40′S 71°32′W

Location
- Country: Chile

The Estero Punitaqui is a river of Chile.

== See also ==
- List of rivers of Chile
