= Chalinga River =

Coordinates: 31.7781°S 70.9864°W

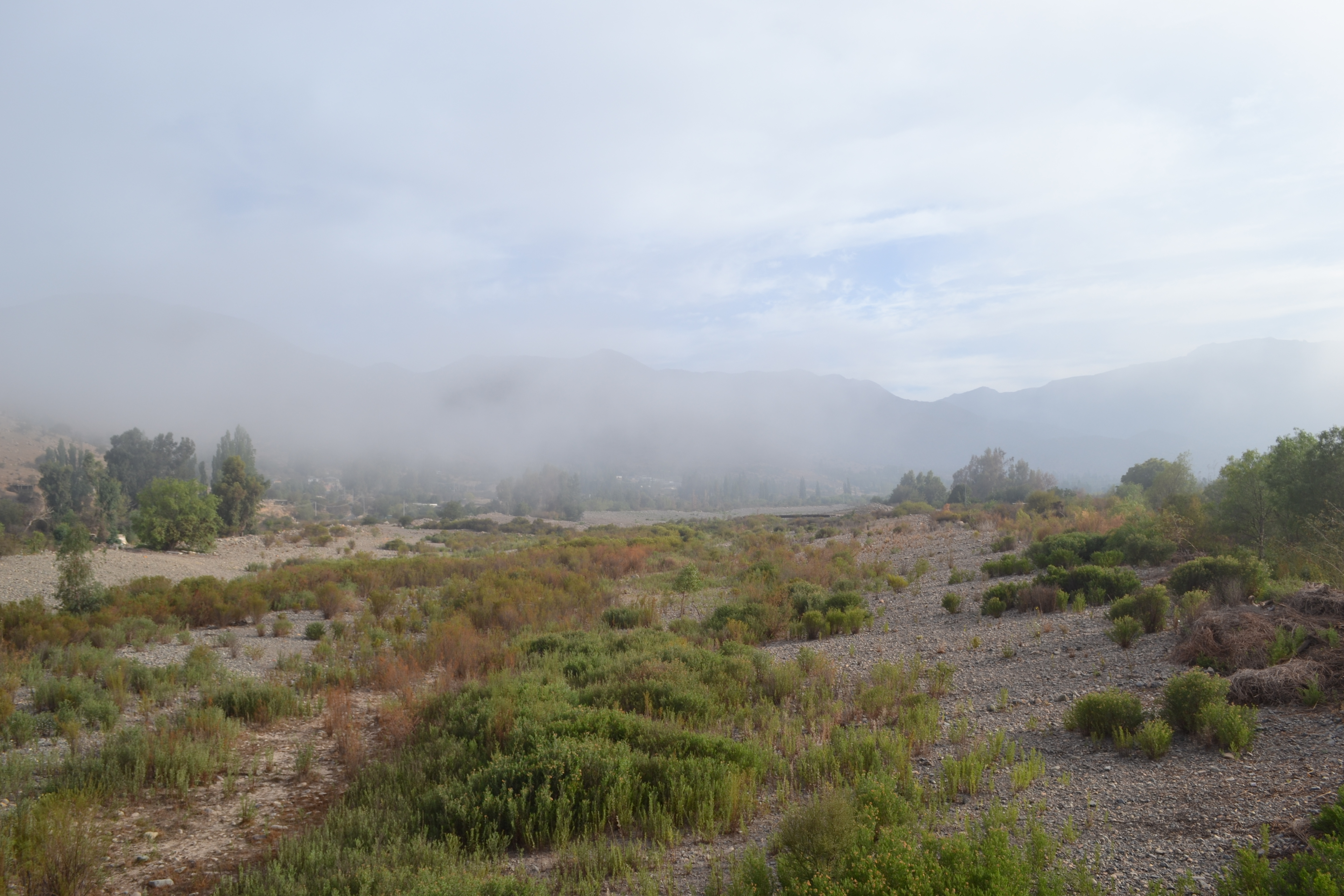

Location
- Country: Chile

The Chalinga River is a river of Chile.

== See also ==
- List of rivers of Chile
