= Isla de Pascua (commune) =

Isla de Pascua Rapa Nui
- Commune
- Flag Coat of arms

- Easter Island map showing Terevaka, Poike, Rano Kau, Motu Nui, Orongo, and Mataveri; major ahus are marked with moai

- Easter Island in the Pacific Ocean
- Coordinates: 27°7′S 109°22′W
- Country: Chile
- Region: Valparaíso
- Province: Isla de Pascua
- Created: February 22, 1966
- Seat: Hanga Roa

Government
  - Type: Municipality
  - Body: Municipal council
  - Alcaldesa: Elizabeth Arévalo Pakarati (Ind.)

Area
  - Total: 163.6 km^{2} (63.2 sq mi)
- Highest elevation: 507 m (1,663 ft)
- Lowest elevation: 0 m (0 ft)

Population (2017 census)
  - Total: 7,750
  - Density: 47.4/km^{2} (123/sq mi)
- Time zone: UTC−6 (CLT)
  - Summer (DST): UTC−5 (CLST)
- Country Code: +56
- Currency: Peso (CLP)
- Language: Spanish, Rapa Nui
- Driving side: right
- Website: http://www.rapanui.net

Isla de Pascua (Easter Island; Rapa Nui) is a Chilean commune with a special regime, (Note: Although the Constitution establishes the commune of Isla de Pascua has a special regime, the organic law supposed to regulate the area has not yet been dictated.) located within Isla de Pascua Province in Valparaíso Region. It is the only commune in Isla de Pascua Province, comprising Easter Island and Isla Salas y Gómez. Its capital is Hanga Roa, located in the southwestern area of the main island, where most of the local population resides.

== Local government ==
The municipality of Isla de Pascua is led by mayor Elizabeth Arévalo Pakarati, who is accompanied in the Municipal Council by:

- Pedro Edmunds Paoa (Ind./PS)
- Omar Alfonso Enrique Veriveri Durán (Ind./RN)
- Moiko Jara Pate (Evópoli)
- Simón Pedro Riroroko Campos (Ind./RN)
- Ivonne Nahoe Zamora (PPD)
- Javiera Patricia Lira Hucke (PS)
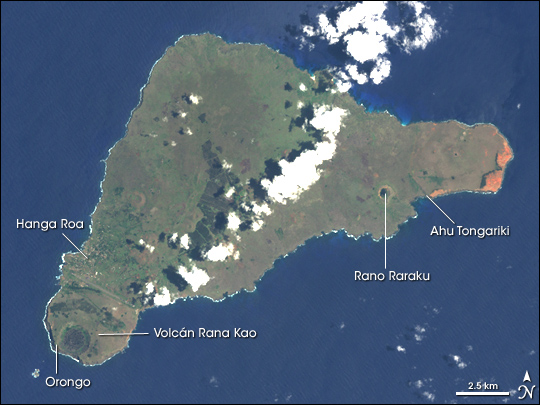
Aerial view of Easter Island

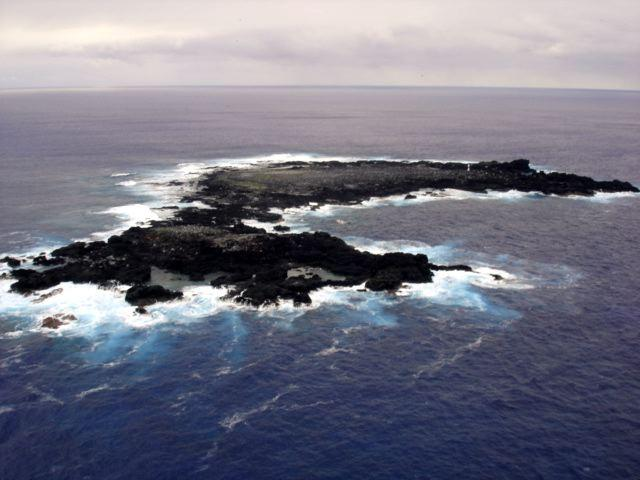
Isla Salas y Gómez is uninhabited
