= Marta Hotus Tuki =

Rapa Nui Chilean politician

Governor of Isla de Pascua Province (Rapa Nui)
- In office 12 March 2014 – 9 September 2015
- President: Michelle Bachelet
- Preceded by: Carmen Cardinali
- Succeeded by: Melania Hotu

Personal details
- Born: 29 July 1969 (age 56) (Easter Island) Rapa-Nui, Chile
- Profession: Politician

Marta Raquel Hotus Tuki is a Rapa Nui Chilean politician, governor of Isla de Pascua Province between 12 March 2014, when she was appointed by President of Chile Michelle Bachelet, and 9 September 2015, being succeeded by Melania Hotu. She has also served as municipal councilor on three occasions.
