= Estero Auco =

Coordinates: 31°40′S 71°17′W

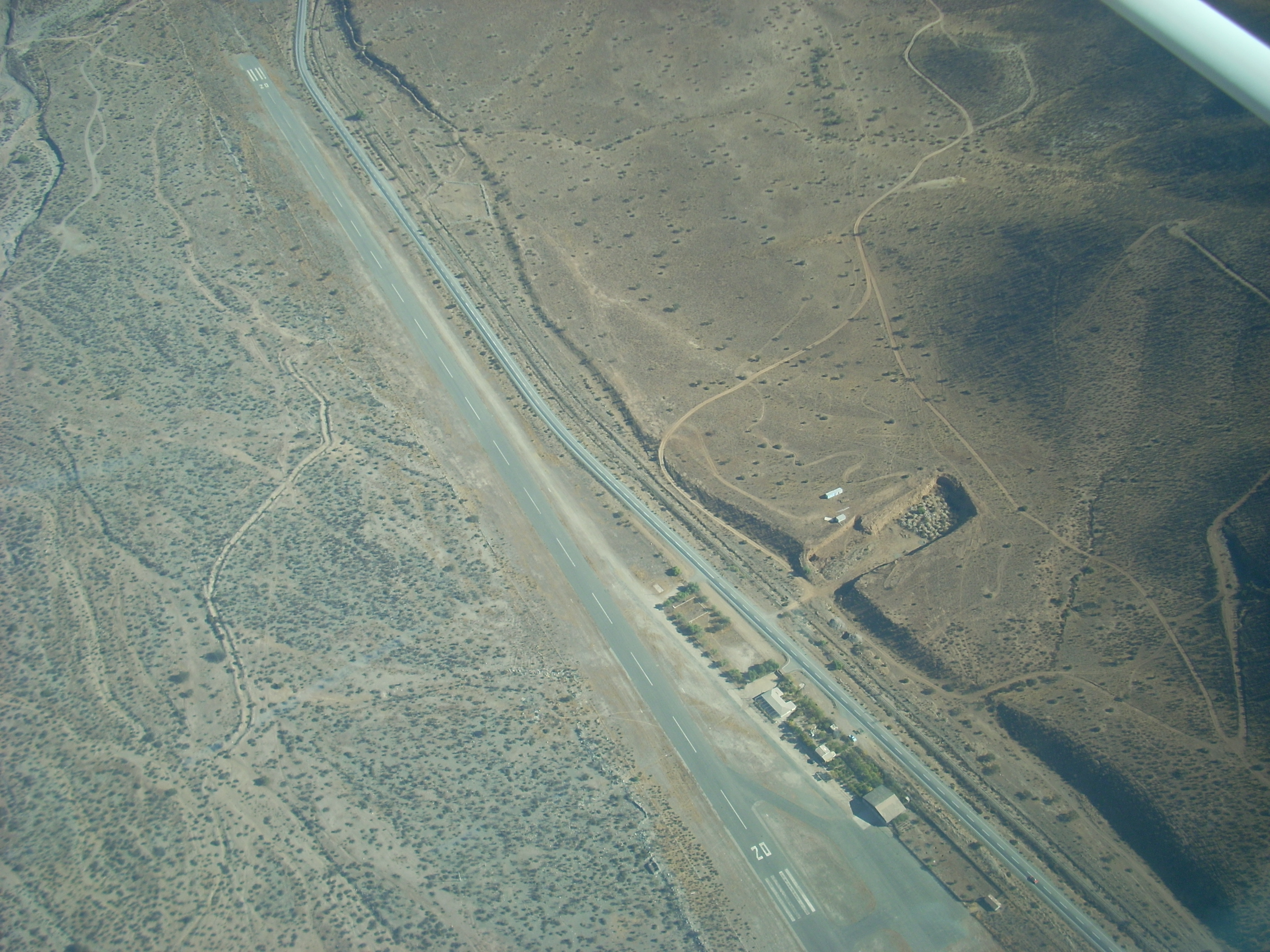

Location
- Country: Chile

The Estero Auco is a river located in Chile. The river passes through Las Chinchillas National Reserve, but does not pass through any major city within Choapa Province.

== See also ==
- List of rivers of Chile
