= Combarbalá River =

Coordinates: 31.1119°S 71.0758°W

Location
- Country: Chile

The Combarbalá River is a river of Chile.

== See also ==
- List of rivers of Chile
