= Aconcagua Province =

Former province of Chile

Aconcagua Province Aconcagua
- Province of Chile
- 1826–1976
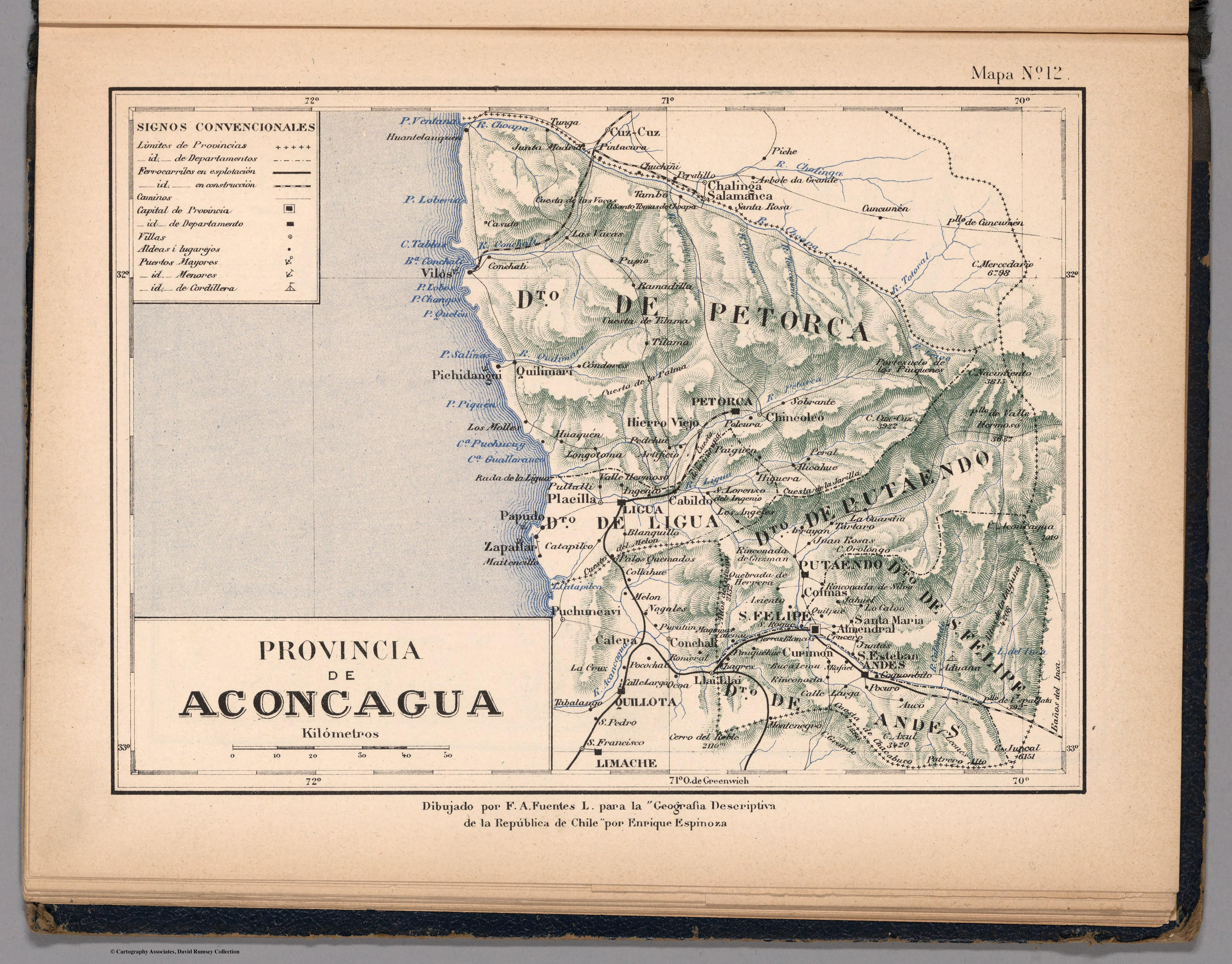
- The Province of Aconcagua (1903)
- Capital: San Felipe; Valparaíso (1928-1936)
- History
  - Creation: 30 August 1826
  - Regionalization: 1 January 1976
Preceded by	Succeeded by
Party of Aconcagua	Valparaíso Region

The Aconcagua Province was one of the administrative divisions of Chile that existed from 1826 to 1976.

== History ==
Aconcagua was one of the original eight provinces (Coquimbo, Aconcagua, Santiago, Colchagua, Maule, Concepción, Valdivia, and Chiloé) created in Chile under the federal laws of August 30, 1826.

The province was composed of:

Delegation	Capital
Petorca	Petorca
La Ligua	La Ligua
Quillota	Quillota
Putaendo	Putaendo
San Felipe	San Felipe
Los Andes	Los Andes

It extended from the Choapa River in the north to the Chacabuco Pass in the south, and from the Andes Mountains to the Pacific Ocean. These boundaries remained largely unchanged until 1928.

The 1828 Constitution established Chile's division into eight provinces (Coquimbo, Aconcagua, Santiago, Colchagua, Maule, Concepción, Valdivia, and Chiloé).

Under the 1833 Constitution, provinces were divided into departments, which were further divided into subdelegations and districts.

The Province of Aconcagua comprised the following departments:

Department	Capital
Petorca	Petorca
La Ligua	La Ligua
Quillota	Quillota
Putaendo	Putaendo
San Felipe	San Felipe
Los Andes	Los Andes

On October 27, 1842, the Quillota Department was separated to create, along with the Valparaíso and Casablanca departments of the Santiago Province, the new Valparaíso Province.

Department	Capital
Petorca	Petorca
La Ligua	La Ligua
Putaendo	Putaendo
San Felipe	San Felipe
Los Andes	Los Andes

By 1925, the departments were:

Department	Capital
Petorca	Petorca
La Ligua	La Ligua
Putaendo	Putaendo
San Felipe	San Felipe
Los Andes	Los Andes

In 1928, the Valparaíso Province was abolished and incorporated into the new Province of Aconcagua, as established by Decree with Force of Law (DFL) 8582 of December 30, 1927:

"Article 1° The country is divided into the following provinces, departments, and territories:..." "PROVINCE OF ACONCAGUA.- Capital Valparaíso.- Departments: Petorca, San Felipe, Andes, Quillota, and Valparaíso;"

"Art. 2° The departments shall have the boundaries fixed by decree-law number 354 of March 17, 1925, and their current capitals, with the following modifications, in addition to those indicated above:"

- The Petorca Department shall comprise the territory of the former La Ligua Department and the former subdelegations 2.a Chincolco, 3.a Petorca, 4.a Hierro Viejo, 5.o Pedegua, 6.a Pichilemu, 7.a Longotoma, 8.a Guaquén, 9.a Quilimarí, 10 Cóndores, and 11 Tilama of the former Petorca Department. Its northern boundary shall be the ridgeline that borders to the south the watersheds of the Pupío Stream and the Choapa River, starting from Punta de Changos on the Pacific Ocean. The capital shall be the city of La Ligua.
- The San Felipe Department shall comprise the territory of the current Putaendo Department, the former subdelegations 1.o Coimas, 2.a Estación, 3.a Hospital, 4.a Santo Domingo, 5.a Almendral, 6.a Tambo, 7.a Santa María, 8.a Jahuel, 9.a San Fernando, and 10 San Nicolás of the former San Felipe Department, and the former subdelegation 5.a Panquehue of the former Los Andes Department;
- The Andes Department shall comprise the former subdelegations 1.a El Sauce, 2.a El Comercio, 3.a San Rafael, 4.a Curimón, 7.a Rinconada, 8.a Villa Alegre, 9.a Tabolango, 10 Calle Larga, 11 Pocuro, and 12 Santa Rosa of the former Los Andes Department, and the former subdelegations 11 San Regis, 12 Miraflores, 13 San José, and 14 Río Colorado of the former San Felipe Department;
- The Quillota Department shall comprise the territory of the former department of the same name and the part of the former subdelegation 6.a Montenegro of the former Los Andes Department that lies north of the ridgeline bordering to the south the watershed of the Aconcagua River;
- The Valparaíso Department shall comprise the territory of the former Limache, Valparaíso, and Casablanca departments and the part of the former subdelegation 5.a Lepe of the former Melipilla Department that lies north of the ridgeline between Cerro del Roble Alto and Cerro de Las Cardas, passing through Alto de Carén, Cerro de Los Morros, and Paso de los Padrones over the Puangue Stream.

Thus, the province was composed of:

Department	Capital
Petorca	La Ligua
Quillota	Quillota
San Felipe	San Felipe
Andes	Los Andes
Valparaíso	Valparaíso

In 1936, provincial boundaries were modified, reducing the size of the Province of Aconcagua to just three departments:

Department	Capital
Petorca	La Ligua
San Felipe	San Felipe
Los Andes	Los Andes

During the 1970s, a new change in the political-administrative division of the country occurred with the creation of regions. In 1975, the Valparaíso Region was created from the provinces of Valparaíso, Aconcagua, and the San Antonio Department of the Santiago Province. The Valparaíso Region was composed of the provinces of Isla de Pascua, Los Andes, Petorca, Quillota, San Antonio, San Felipe de Aconcagua, and Valparaíso. Thus, the three departments of the Province of Aconcagua became provinces of the same name, and the Province of Aconcagua was abolished. The region was governed by an intendant, and each province was governed by a governor. The provincial and communal levels were reformed, and departments and districts were abolished (the latter are currently used by the National Statistics Institute as census districts for census purposes).

== Intendants ==
This list is incomplete.

- Martín Prats Urízar (1826-1827)
- José Joaquín Pérez Mascayano (1827-18??)
- Fernando Urízar Garfias (1837-18??)
- José Manuel Novoa Sanhueza (1841)
- Francisco Bascuñán Guerrero (1857-1858)

== See also ==
- Administrative divisions of Chile
