= Vacas Heladas River =

Location
- Country: Chile

The Vacas Heladas River is a river in Chile.

== See also ==
- List of rivers of Chile
