= Quilimarí River =

Location
- Country: Chile

Physical characteristics
- Source
  - coordinates: 32°04′08″S 71°04′14″W
  - elevation: 4,390 feet (1,340 m)
- Mouth
  - coordinates: 32°07′04″S 71°30′38″W
- Length: 50 km (31 mi)

The Quilimarí River is a river of Chile. It arises from several small streams in the foothills of the Andes, and runs for some 50 kilometres (31 mi) westward to the mouth at Quilimarí on the Pacific coast.

The river forms the Culimo reservoir (sv) above a dam 27 kilometres (17 mi) inland and 5 kilometres (3.1 mi) west of the village of Tilama.

== See also ==
- List of rivers of Chile
