= Valparaíso (historical province) =

Administrative divisions of Chile that existed between 1842 and 1976

Valparaíso Province Valparaíso
- Province of Chile
- 1842–1976
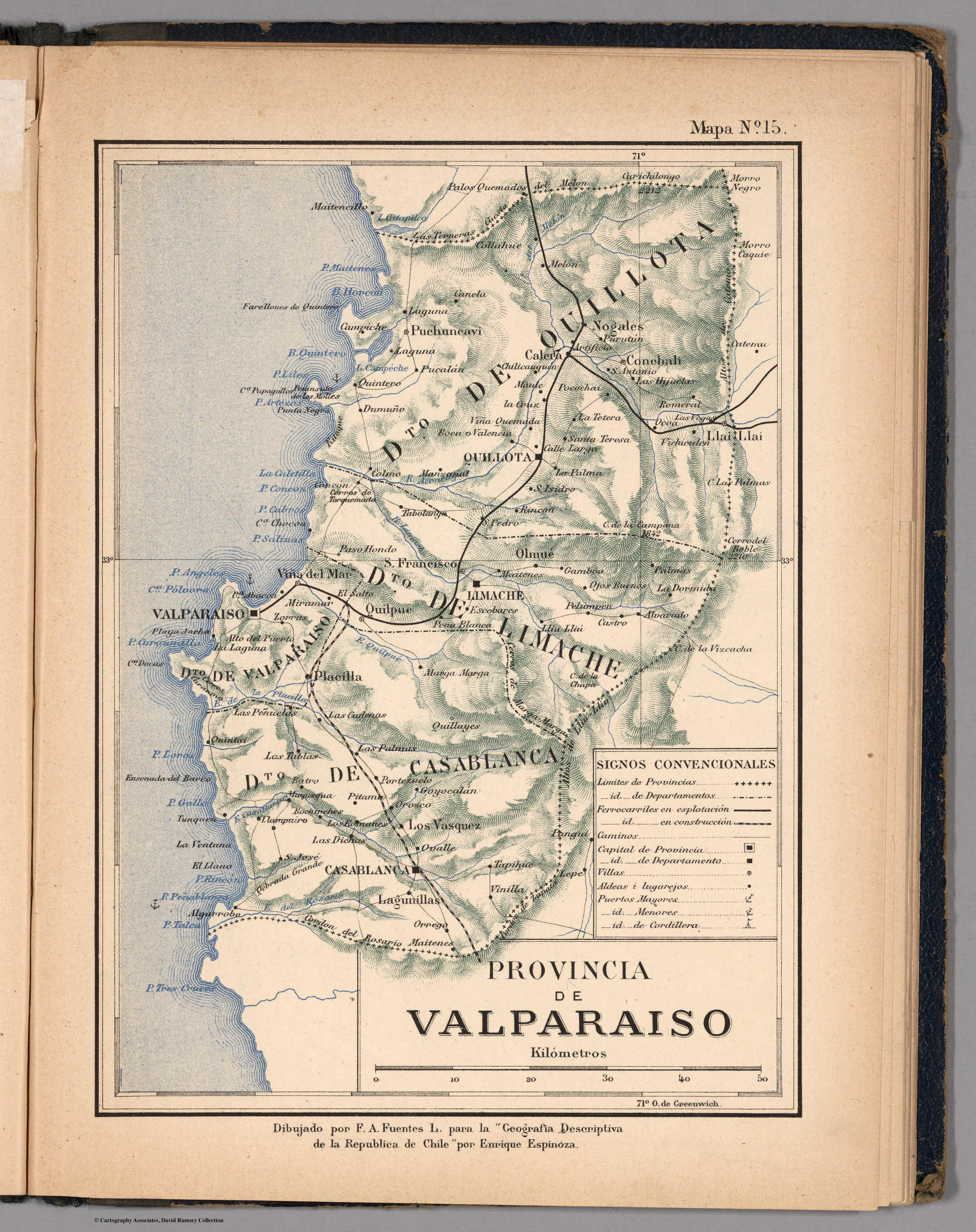
- The Province of Valparaíso in 1903
- Capital: Valparaíso
- History
  - Creation: 27 October 1842
  - Regionalization: 1 January 1976
Preceded by	Succeeded by
Santiago (historical province); Aconcagua Province	Valparaíso Region

The Valparaíso Province was one of the administrative divisions of Chile that existed between 1842 and 1976.

== History ==
It was created by a law of October 27, 1842, with three departments (Valparaíso, Casablanca, and Quillota). This law separated the Quillota Department from the Aconcagua Province, as well as the Valparaíso Department and Casablanca Department from the Santiago Province. Its capital was the city of the same name.

Department	Capital
Valparaíso	Valparaíso
Casablanca	Casablanca
Quillota	Quillota

By 1856 the departments were as follows:

Department	Capital
Valparaíso	Valparaíso
Casablanca	Casablanca
Quillota	Quillota
Ferrocarril	
Juan Fernández	Juan Fernández

In 1925 the departments were as follows:

Department	Capital
Valparaíso	Valparaíso
Casablanca	Casablanca
Quillota	Quillota
Limache	Limache

On December 30, 1927, Decree with Force of Law (DFL) 8582 abolished the province of Valparaíso, which became part of the new Aconcagua Province. The departments of Limache and Casablanca were also abolished.

According to DFL 8582:

"Article 1. The country is divided into the following provinces, departments and territories: (...)

- PROVINCE OF ACONCAGUA.–Capital: Valparaíso.–Departments: Petorca, San Felipe, Andes, Quillota and Valparaíso; (...)

Article 2. The departments shall have the boundaries fixed by decree-law number 354 of March 17, 1925, and their current capitals, with the following modifications, in addition to those indicated above: (...)

- The Quillota Department shall comprise the territory of the former department of the same name, and the part of the former subdelegation 6th Montenegro, of the current Los Andes Department, that lies north of the ridgeline bordering to the south the watershed of the Aconcagua River;
- The Valparaíso Department shall comprise the territory of the former Limache, Valparaíso and Casablanca departments, and the part of the former subdelegation 5th Lepe, of the current Melipilla Department, that lies north of the ridgeline between Cerro del Roble Alto and Cerro de Las Cardas, passing through Alto de Carén, Cerro de Los Morros and Paso de los Padrones over the Puangue Stream; (...)."

Later, in 1936, the province of Valparaíso was reestablished with the following departments:

Department	Capital
Valparaíso	Valparaíso
Quillota	Quillota

Subsequently, the Easter Island Department was created, establishing the province of Valparaíso as follows:

Department	Capital
Valparaíso	Valparaíso
Quillota	Quillota
Easter Island	Hanga Roa

During the 1970s, a new change occurred in the political-administrative division of the country with the creation of regions.

In 1976, the Valparaíso Region was created from the former provinces of Valparaíso and Aconcagua Province, as well as the San Antonio Department of the Santiago Province.

== See also ==
- Valparaíso Province
- Administrative divisions of Chile
