= Cogotí River =

River in Chile

Coordinates: 30.8686°S 70.9964°W

- Río Limarí basin

The Cogotí River is a river watercourse in the Coquimbo Region that flows from the watershed on the border to the Cogotí Dam.

== See also ==
- List of rivers of Chile
