= List of stock used by PeruRail =

This article gives an incomplete list of locomotives, motor cars, and passenger cars used by PeruRail and by Inca Rail, working in parallel to PeruRail, and owning the motor cars numbered above 900.

== PeruRail Diesel locomotives ==
PeruRail No.	Gauge	Builder & Model	Factory No.	Date Built	Acquired	Year Retired	Remarks	Photo
300	1435	ALCo RSD-8 (Specification DL-531)	82990	Sep. 1958	new		Built for FCS	
350	......	......	......	......	......	......	See, #486, below.	
351	1435	ALCo RSD-39 (Specification DL-535B)	84670	Aug. 1963	new	[by 1997]	Built for FCS. Standard gauge. Never re-gauged to 914 mm. Scrapped [1997~ 1999].	
352	1435 / 914	ALCo RSD-39 (Specification DL-535B)	84671	Aug. 1963	new		Built for FCS. Originally standard gauge. Re-gauged to 914 mm. in 1999, retaining the same number.	
353	1435 / 914	ALCo RSD-39 (Specification DL-535B)	84672	Sep. 1963	new		Built for FCS. Originally standard gauge. Re-gauged to 914 mm. in 1999, retaining the same number.	
354	1435	ALCo RSD-39 (Specification DL-535B)	84673	Sep. 1963	new	[1983~ 1999]	Built for FCS. Standard gauge. Never re-gauged to 914 mm. Scrapped [1983~ 1999].	
355	1435	ALCo RSD-39 (Specification DL-535B)	84674	Sep. 1963	new		Built for FCS. Standard gauge. [Either #355 or #359 became #485 in 1978. The other was scrapped by 1999.]	
356	1435 / 914	ALCo RSD-39 (Specification DL-535B)	84675	Oct. 1963	new		Built for FCS. Originally standard gauge. Re-gauged to 914 mm. [1989~ 1996], retaining the same number.	
357	......	......	......	......	......	......	See, #487, below.	
358	1435 / 914	ALCo RSD-39 (Specification DL-535B)	84677	Oct. 1963	new		Built for FCS. Originally standard gauge. Re-gauged to 914 mm. in 2001, retaining the same number.	
359	1435	ALCo RSD-39 (Specification DL-535B)	84678	[Oct. or Nov.] 1963	new		Built for FCS. Standard gauge. [Either #355 or #359 became #485 in 1978. The other was scrapped by 1999.]	
360	1435 / 914	ALCo RSD-39 (Specification DL-535B)	84679	Nov. 1963	new	1999	Built for FCS. Originally standard gauge. Re-gauged to 914 mm. [1989~ 1998], retaining the same number. Back to standard gauge in 1999. Stored.	
400	914	ALCo RSD-35 (Specification DL-535M)	84265	Feb. 1963	2005		Originally, 1000 mm. gauge, General Belgrano Railway (Argentina) #6763. Re-numbered to 6783. Purchased by FCCSA (#400) and re-gauged to 914 mm. in 2005.	
401-402	914	Mitsubishi Heavy Industries; Sulzer; 55-Ton	1120 and 1121	Aug. 1962	new	1977	Originally, ##DD2601 and DD2602. Officially re-numbered to 401 and 402 in 1972, but continued to bear “DD2601” and “DD2602.” Stored	photo of DD2601
403	......	......	......	......	......	......	See, #481, below.	
404	......	......	......	......	......	......	See, #482, below.	
481	914	ALCo RSD-30 (Specification DL-535A)	3462-01	Dec. 1966	1971		Originally, FC del Santa #100. Purchased by FCCSA in 1971 (#2603). Re-numbered to 403, then to 481 in 1972.	
482	914 / 1435 / 914	ALCo RSD-30 (Specification DL-535A)	3462-02	Dec. 1966	1971		Originally, FC del Santa #101. Purchased by FCCSA in 1971 (#2604). Re-numbered to 404, then to 482 in 1972. Re-gauged to standard gauge in 2001. Back to 914 mm. gauge in 2002.	
483-484	914	MLW Series C-14 (Specification DL-535B)	M6078-04 and M6078-05	Sep. 1974	new		#485 built in 1963 according to	
485	1435 / 914	ALCo RSD-39 (Specification DL-535B)	[84674 or 84678]	[Sep.~ Nov.] 1963	new	2002	Originally, standard gauge [#355 or 359]. Re-gauged to 914 mm. and re-numbered to 485 in 1978.	
486	1435 / 914 / 1435	ALCo RSD-39 (Specification DL-535B)	84669	Aug. 1963	new	[1990~ 1997]	Originally, standard gauge #350. Re-gauged to 914 mm. and re-numbered to 486 in 1978. Back to standard gauge in 1984, retaining No. “486.” Scrapped [1997~ 1999].	
487	1435 / 914	ALCo RSD-39 (Specification DL-535B)	84676	Oct. 1963	new		Originally, standard gauge #357. Re-gauged to 914 mm. and re-numbered to 487 in 1984.	
500-505	1435	ALCo FPD-6 (Specification DL-500C)	81735-81740	Sep.-Nov. 1956	new	[by 2016]	Built for FCS	
500 (2nd)	914	EMD G12	22620	Oct. 1956	2008		Originally standard gauge, FC NdeM #5821. Purchased by FCCSA, rebuilt, and re-gauged to 914 mm. in 2008.	
510	914	EMD GR12	31659	May 1966	[2008~ 2013]		Originally standard gauge, FC Cerro de Pasco #37. Transferred to Centromín in 1974 (#37). Purchased by FCCSA and re-gauged to 914 mm. [2008~ 2013].	
520	914	EMD GR12	31607	Apr. 1966	[2008~ 2013]		Originally, standard gauge, FC Cerro de Pasco #35. Transferred to Centromín in 1974 (#35). Purchased by FCCSA and re-gauged to 914 mm. [2008~ 2013].	
530-531; 532-533; 534-537	914	Locomotoras San Luis LSL 1400-2		2016; 2017; 2018	new		. 532 was hauled to Cusco in July 2017. 533 reported in service October 2017. Four more to be delivered 2018.	
550-552	1435	ALCo RSD-34 (Specification DL-543)	84040-84042	Nov. 1961	new			
553-555	1435	ALCo RSD-34 (Specification DL-543)	84055-84057	Dec. 1961	new			
556-557	1435	ALCo RSD-34 (Specification DL-543)	84371-84372	Jun. 1963	new			
558-560	1435	ALCo RSD-34 (Specification DL-543)	84680-84682	Aug. 1963	new			
600	1435	ALCo RSD-29 (Specification DL-560)	84740	Dec. 1963			Built for FC Central (Peruvian Corporation)	
651-660	1435	MLW Series C-26 (Specification DL-560D)	M6076-06 and M6076-15	Nov. 1974	new		(MLW discontinued use of ALCo's “RSD-” designation, in favor of a “Series” designation.)	
751-755	1435	GMD GT26CW-2	A4079-A4083	Sep. 1981	new			
756-757	1435	GMD GT26CW-2	A4282-A4283	Sep. 1983	new			
758	(?)	Locomotive Services Ltd.					Type unknown	
800-814	1435	Progress Rail GT42AC	20118600–001 to 20118600-015	2015	new			
815	1435	Progress Rail GT42AC		2022	new			
DD2601-DD2602	......	......	......	......	......	......	See, ##401-402, above.	
2603	......	......	......	......	......	......	See, #481, above.	
2604	......	......	......	......	......	......	See, #482, above.	

passim
PeruRail reported 26 Diesel locomotives in 2002.

== PeruRail and Inca Rail Railcars ==
PeruRail No.	Gauge	Builder & Model	Factory No.	Date Built	Acquired	Year Retired	Remarks	Photo
22, 25–26, 53–54, 56–57, 59, 61, 63, 68–70, 73, 80, 82, 84	1435						Track Motor Cars. Known locally as “Autovia”s.	
55	914	Mitsubishi Heavy Industries	1134	1962	new	[by 1984]	Originally, #P3001. Re-numbered to 55 [by 1964]. Scrapped [by 1990].	
58-59	......	......	......	......	......	......	See, ##216-217, below.	
60	914	Kinki Sharyo (Based on JNR KiHa 20/52)		1967	new	[1978 or 1979]	Cabs at both ends. Delivered as #60, transferred to FC Huancayo-Huancavelica as #31 [1978 or 1979]	photo of 60
101	914	Edwards Rail Car Model 20		2009	new	2015	Andean Railways Corp. until 2012; Inca Rail thereafter. Cabs at both ends. Unit performed poorly. Located the Inca Rail depot near Ollantaytambo in July 2022, status unknown.	
102	914	Edwards Rail Car Model 20		2010	new	2015	Andean Railways Corp. until 2012; Inca Rail thereafter. Cabs at both ends. Unit performed poorly. Located the Inca Rail depot near Ollantaytambo in July 2022, status unknown.	
151-154	914	Wickham		[by 1972]	new	151-153: [1984~ 1999]	Inspection Cars. Re-numbered to 151-154 [1972~ 1984]. Only #154 remains in service.	
216-217	914	Ferrostaal		1966	new		Single-cab. (Observation cars). Originally, ##58 & 59. Re-numbered to 216 & 217 [1980~ 1983].	
220-225	914	Macosa/MAN		1984	new		Single-cab. Usually operated in multiple unit.	
230-231	914	Zanello		1997	2007		Single-cab cars, usually operated in two-car unit, back-to-back. Gran Confort bogies. Originally, 1000 mm. gauge, Tren de las Sierras of the General Belgrano Railway (Argentina). Purchased by FCCSA and re-gauged to 914 mm. in 2007.	photo of 231
___, ___	914	________		[19__]	[1999~ 2002]	......	Two 1000 mm. gauge railcars purchased from Bolivia [1999~ 2002]. At least one never entered service. [¿Did the other become #232?]	
232	914	Maschinenfabrik Augsburg-Nürnberg		[1976 ?]	[1999~ 2017]		Single-cab car, usually operated in multiple unit. Entered service [2007~ 2017]. [¿Is this one of the ex-Bolivian railcars, listed above?]	photo of 232
284-290	914	Fairmont		[by 1986]	[19__]		Gang Cars. Factory installed front, back, and roof. Known locally as “Autovia”s. Motors replaced between 1989 and 1998.	
291	914	Volkswagen; Fairmont		[by 2004]	[by 2004]		Inspection railbus. Combination of ≈1975 VW van body and Fairmont A8 (Z36) chassis.	
903-905; 913-915; 923-925	914	Đuro Đaković		1963~ 1969	2007		Inca Rail. ##903-905 and 913-915 have single cabs. ##923-925 are cab-less. Originally, 762 mm. gauge, Yugoslavia JŽ-802 type. Sold to Portugal CP and re-gauged to 1000 mm. in 1980 (CP-9700 series). Re-numbered to CP-9403, -9404, -9405, -9413, -9414, -9415, -9423, -9424, and -9425 in 1993. Sold to IR and re-gauged to 914 mm. in 2007 (each car's new IR number consisting of the first, third, and fourth digits of its last Portugal CP number). Usually operated in multiple unit, preferably with cab-less cars between and to the rear of cab cars. Car names from 2007 to 2014: 903 (Sinchi Roca); 904 (Manco Capac); 905 (Inca Roca); 913 (Mayta Capac); 914 (Pachacutec); 915 (Huiracocha); 923 (Mama Tancaray); 924 (Mama Ocllo); 925 (Inca Princess).	
941	914	Eskalduna		1958; rebuilt, Sep. 1987	2013		Inca Rail trailer. Originally powered, 1000 mm. gauge, FG Catalonia #2016. Re-numbered to 3003 in 1959. Rebuilt into un-powered trailer in 1987. Sold to FEVE (Spain) in 2009 (#5351). Sold to IR and re-gauged to 914 mm. in 2013 (#941). Put into service as the un-powered middle car of the three-dedicated-car set ##951-941-954.	
943	914	Eskalduna		1958	2013		Inca Rail trailer. Originally un-powered, 1000 mm. gauge, FG Catalonia #5013. Re-numbered to 4001 in 1959. Sold to FEVE (Spain) in 2009 (#5353). Sold to IR and re-gauged to 914 mm. in 2013 (#943). Put into service as the un-powered middle car of the three-dedicated-car set ##952-943-953.	
951	914	Eskalduna		Jul. 1967; rebuilt, Aug. 1988	2013		Inca Rail. Single cab. Originally, 1000 mm. gauge, FG Catalonia #3010. Sold to FEVE (Spain) in 2009 (#2351), Sold to IR and re-gauged to 914 mm. in 2013 (#951). Put into service as an end car of the three-dedicated-car set ##951-941-954.	
952	914	Eskalduna		Jul. 1967; rebuilt, Apr. 1987	2013		Inca Rail. Single cab. Originally, 1000 mm. gauge, FG Catalonia #3011. Sold to FEVE (Spain) in 2009 (#2352). Sold to IR and re-gauged to 914 mm. in 2013 (#952). Put into service as an end car of the three-dedicated-car set ##952-943-953.	photo of 952
953	914	Maschinenfabrik Augsburg-Nürnberg		Aug. 1966; rebuilt, Mar. 1988	2013		Inca Rail. Single cab. Originally, 1000 mm. gauge, FG Catalonia #3005. Sold to FEVE (Spain) in 2009 (#2353). Sold to IR and re-gauged to 914 mm. in 2013 (#953). Put into service as an end car of the three-dedicated-car set ##952-943-953.	
954	914	Maschinenfabrik Augsburg-Nürnberg		Sep. 1966; rebuilt, Jun. 1988	2013		Inca Rail. Single cab. Originally, 1000 mm. gauge, FG Catalonia #3006. Sold to FEVE (Spain) in 2009 (#2354). Sold to IR and re-gauged to 914 mm. in 2013 (#954). Put into service as an end car of the three-dedicated-car set ##951-941-954.	
970-975	914	Đuro Đaković Portuguese train type 9500		1995	2015		Inca Rail railbuses. Cabs at both ends. Originally, 1000 mm. gauge, Portugal CP ##9501, 9502, 9504 (Bruxelas), 9507, 9508, 9509. Sold to IR and re-gauged to 914 mm. in 2015 (##970-975). IR #970 = CP #9504; remaining cars in unknown individual correspondence. Underframes of the same make as 903~ 925, former Série 9700	photo of 973 & 975

passim
PeruRail reported ten DMU's in 2002, which included two ex-Bolivian railcars that had not by then entered service. The remaining eight DMU's at the time were ##216-217 and 220–225. Later, one of the ex-Bolivian railcars may have become #232.

== PeruRail Passenger Cars ==
PeruRail No.	Gauge	Builder	Date Built	Acquired	Year Retired	Remarks	Photo
1501; 1502; 1503; 1504; 1505; 1506; 1507; 1509	914	Astra Arad	1975	new		Rebuilt about 2010, many with roof windows.	
1521; 1522; 1523; 1524; 1525; 1528; 1529	914	Astra Arad	1975	new		Rebuilt about 2010, many with roof windows. Note: Originally, ##1523, 1524, 1528, and 1529 had had center doors and no vestibules. About 2010, these cars were rebuilt with vestibules, and without the center doors.	no roof flange Center door coach After rebuilt
1530	914	Kinki Sharyo	[1963-1969]	new		Has center doors and no vestibules. Rebuilt about 2010, with roof windows.	LEFT side
1531; 1532	914	Cravens	1970	new		Originally, standard gauge baggage car. Rebuilt into coach and re-gauged to 914 mm. [1999~ 2002].	
1533; 1534; 1535; 1536	914	Kinki Sharyo	1962	new		Rebuilt about 2010, many with roof windows.	roof flange & oval Kinki Sharyo plate 2000s
1542; 1544	914	Astra Arad	1975	new		Rebuilt about 2010, many with roof windows.	
1552	914	Cravens	1970	new		Originally, standard gauge baggage car. Rebuilt into coach and re-gauged to 914 mm. [1999~ 2002].	
1563; 1564; 1566; 1570; 1573; 1576; 1578	914	Astra Arad	1975	new		Rebuilt about 2010, many with roof windows.	
1641; 1642; 1643; 1645; 1646; 1647; 1648	914	Astra Arad	1975	new		Rebuilt about 2010, many with roof windows.	
1651; 1652	914	Kinki Sharyo	[1963-1969]	new		Rebuilt about 2010, many with roof windows.	
1701; 1705; 1707; 1711; 1712; 1713; 1719; 1722	914	Astra Arad	1975	new		Rebuilt about 2010, many with roof windows.	
1799; 1808	914	Cravens	1970	new		Originally, standard gauge baggage car. Rebuilt into coach and re-gauged to 914 mm. [1999~ 2002].	
1851; 1854; 1861; 1863; 1865	914	Kinki Sharyo	[1963-1969]	new		Rebuilt about 2010, many with roof windows.	After rebuilt
3901; 3902; 3905; 3906; 3907; 3912	914	Astra Arad trucks made by Sumitomo	1975	new		Boxcars, used in express service.	
3970-3978	914	Cobrasma	1982	new		Boxcars, used in express service.	
9002-9006 (Belmond Hiram Bingham cars)	914	[built in South Africa]	[before 1999]	1999		No. 9002 = Dining Car; #9003 = Lounge Car; #9004 = Dining Car; #9005 = Lounge & Observation Car; #9006 = Kitchen Car. Previously-owned cars. Purchased in 1999 in Singapore for Belmond Hiram Bingham train. Rebuilt into luxury cars.	
1508; 1565; 1567; 1568; 1571; 1572; 1574; 1710; 1717; 1721; 1918; 1919; Titicaca Train cars	1435	Astra Arad	1975	new		Originally, 914 mm. gauge coaches. Rebuilt into standard gauge luxury cars for the Titicaca Train. 1567 = Lounge & Observation Car; 1721 = Lounge & Observation Car.	
1971; 1972; Titicaca Train cars	1435	Astra Arad	1975	new		Baggage Cars.	
1715 (Track Geometry Inspection Car)	1435	Astra Arad	1975	new		Originally, a coach. Rebuilt into track geometry inspection car in 2002.	
?	1435	Cravens	1950s	new		Baggage car, Manufactured at Cravens in the United Kingdom, for Peruvian Corporation.	
1825 (Kiwicha); 1826 (Totora); 1830 (Ichu); 1831 (Coca); 1832; 1834 (Capuli); 1836; 1838 (Llama); 1839 (Maca); 1841 (Tara); 1843 (Tola); 1847 (Chilca); 1850 (Picaflor); 1852 (Muña); 1853; 1854; 1858 (Molle); 1859 (Yareta); Belmond Andean Explorer cars	1435	Queensland Rail's Townsville workshop	1999	2016		1825, 1826, 1831, 1834, 1841, 1843, 1847, & 1859 = Sleeping Cars; 1830 = Observation Car; 1832 = Baggage & Power Car; 1836 = Kitchen Car; 1838 & 1852 = Dining Cars; 1839 = Piano Bar Car; 1850 = Spa Car; 1853 & 1854 = Crew Cars. Cars originally operated in Australia as the Great South Pacific Express. Cars sold to Orient-Express Hotels in 2005. Orient-Express Hotels changed name to Belmond in 2014. Cars moved to Peru in 2016, and began use as Belmond Andean Explorer in 2017. Original Australian car numbers were retained, but Southern Peru-related car names were added. Eponyms: Capuli [ Aztec: species of fruit tree ]; Chilca [ Quechua: baccharis genistelloides, dye-plant]; Coca [coca]; Ichu [Quechua: Peruvian feathergrass ]; Kiwicha [Quechua: species of flowering plant ]; Llama [llama]; Maca [Quechua: type of root vegetable ]; Molle [Quechua: Peruvian pepper tree ]; Muña [Quechua: love; also, an Andean mint plant ]; Picaflor [Spanish: hummingbird]; Tara [Quechua: species of small tree ]; Tola [Quechua: species of shrub ]; Totora [Quechua: giant bulrush sedge ]; Yareta [Quechua: slow growing flowering plant ].	

passim

== Former FC Cuzco-Machu Picchu-Santa Ana (FCCSA) Narrow Gauge Steam Locomotives ==
Number	Builder Shop No.	Whyte Type Tractive Effort	Date Built	Remarks	Photo
......	Orenstein & Koppel No. 4623	0-6-0T	Apr. 1911	Owned by Graham, Rowe & Co. (railway construction contractors). Originally 750 mm. gauge. Converted to 914 mm. gauge in 1920. Put on display at San Pedro Station in 1977. Put on display in front of Wánchaq Station in 2001.	
Proposed 1	Vulcan Iron Works No. 3025	2-8-0	Mar. 1920	Originally ordered for the FCCSA in June 1919; to be named Izcuchaca. Order recipient changed to the FC Huancayo-Huancavelica in September 1919 (Proposed #1 or 2, Izcuchaca). Ultimately, delivered to the FC Noroeste in 1920 (#8, Izcuchaca). On FC Noroeste roster in 1925. Disposition unknown.	
100	Baldwin No. 42865	4-6-0 19,106 lbf (84.99 kN)	Feb. 1916	Originally, Sumpter Valley Ry. #50. Retired in 1941. Purchased by FCCSA, via Dulien Steel Products, in 1945 (#125). Re-numbered to 100 in 1969. Retired [1975~ 1977]. Scrapped [1977~ 1982].	
101	Baldwin No. 59205	2-8-2 16,541 lbf (73.58 kN)	May 1926	Originally, FCCSA #4 (1st La Convencion). Re-numbered to 1st 123 (2nd Ing. Viñas) [by 1943]. Officially re-numbered to 101 in 1969, but continued to bear “123.” Wrecked in 1972. Scrapped in 1982.	
102	Baldwin No. 59206	2-8-2 16,541 lbf (73.58 kN)	May 1926	Originally, FCCSA #5 (Presidente Leguia). Re-numbered to 124 (2nd La Convencion) [by 1943]. Re-numbered to 102 in 1969. Retired [1978~ 1982]. Put on display at Parque Reductio, Lima as Presidente Leguia in 1994.	
1st 120	Baldwin No. 54267	2-8-0 11,227 lbf (49.94 kN)	Jan. 1921	Originally, FCCSA #1 (Cuzco). Re-numbered to 1st 120 [by 1943]. Retired [by 1965]. Scrapped in 1969.	
1st 121	Baldwin No. 54268	2-8-0 11,227 lbf (49.94 kN)	Jan. 1921	Originally, FCCSA #2 (Santa Ana). Re-numbered to 1st 121 [by 1943]. Retired [by 1965]. Scrapped in 1969.	
1st 122	Baldwin No. 58011	2-8-2 16,541 lbf (73.58 kN)	Sep. 1924	Originally, FCCSA #3 (1st Ingeniero Viñas). Sold. To FC Lima-Lurin (#51) [1936~ 1942]. Re-sold back to FCCSA (1st 122) [by 1943]. Retired [by 1957]. Scrapped [1958~ 1965].	
1st 123	......	......	......	See, #101, above.	
124	......	......	......	See, #102, above.	
125	......	......	......	See, #100, above.	
126	......	......	......	See, 2nd 123, below.	
127	......	......	......	Likely reserved for, but not used by, 2nd 122, below.	
128	......	......	......	See, 2nd 120, below.	
129	......	......	......	See, 2nd 121, below.	
2nd 120	ALCo No. 61555	2-8-2 23,711 lbf (105.47 kN)	Jan. 1920	Originally, FC Casa Grande #13. Sold to FC Lima-Lurin (#4) [1926 or 1927]. Purchased by FCCSA (#128) [1956 or 1957]. Re-numbered to 2nd 120 in 1969. Scrapped [1974~ 1982].	
2nd 121	Henschel No. 26402	2-8-2	1950	Originally, FC Lima-Lurin #11. Sold to FC del Santa (#11) [1956 or 1957]. Purchased by FCCSA (#129) [1957~ 1960]. Re-numbered to 2nd 121 in 1969. Re-numbered to 0994 in 1982. Retired [1981~ 1997]. Scrapped [1984~ 1999].	
2nd 122	Henschel No. 26484	2-8-2	1951	Originally FC Huancayo-Huancavelica #12. Re-numbered to 105. Purchased by FCCSA (#105) [1956 or 1957]. Re-numbered to 2nd 122 in 1969. Re-numbered to 0995 in 1982. Retired [1985~ 1997]. Stored [by 1998]. The 1999 contract requires PeruRail to obtain permission from the Government before making any alterations to this locomotive.	
2nd 123	Henschel No. 26444	2-8-2	1955	Originally, FCCSA #126. Re-numbered to 2nd 123 in 1969. Re-numbered to 0996 in 1982. Retired [1985~ 1997]. Put on display as #123, at Parque Urpicha (Calle dos de Mayo & San Martin), Cusco [1986~ 1999].	

passim

== Railroad-owned Vessels on Lake Titicaca ==
Name	Year built	Builder & Hull No.	Reassembled at Lake Titicaca	Volume (gross tons)	Hull Length (feet)	Rig	Remarks	Photo
Coya	1892	William Denny & Bros. No. 463	1893	546	170	1 double expansion steam engine, 2 screws	Built for the Peruvian Corporation. Transferred to ENAFER in 1972. Stranded during floods in 1984. Sold to a scrap dealer in the 1990s. Resold to Juan Barriga. Rebuilt as a restaurant at Puno in 2001.	
Inca	1905	Earle's Shipbuilding No. 489	1905	1809	220	2 triple expansion steam engines, 2 screws	Built for the Peruvian Corporation. Transferred to ENAFER in 1972. Scrapped in 1994.	
Manco Capac	1970	Halifax Shipyard No. 60	1971	1535	286	1 Diesel engine, 1 screw	Freight Car Ferry. Capacity = 1800 tons, 38 crewmembers. Built for the Peruvian Government. To PeruRail in 1999. In use as a freight car ferry.	
......	......	Halifax Shipyard	......	......	......	......	Proposed second Freight Car Ferry. Order placed in 1968. Order cancelled in 1969.	
Ollanta	1930	Earle's Shipbuilding No. 679	1931	2200	265	2 triple expansion steam engines, 2 screws	Original capacity = 86 passengers, 950 tons freight. Built for the Peruvian Corporation. Transferred to ENAFER in 1972. Services suspended in 1981. To PeruRail in 1999. Capacity changed to 70 passengers [1999~ 2001]. Available for charter since 2001.	
Yapura (Puno, after 1975)	1862	Thames Ironworks	1872	____	100	1 screw. Steam power (1862-1956); Diesel power (1956-present)	Built for Peruvian Government. Originally intended to be a gunboat, but no guns were ever installed. In passenger service by 1873. Leased to Guillermo Speedie from 1874 to 1883. Leased to Juan L. Thorndike from 1883 to 1887. Purchased by the Peruvian Corporation in 1890. Transferred to ENAFER in 1972. Transferred to Peruvian Coast Guard and converted to hospital ship BAP Puno in 1976.	
Yavarí	1862	Thames Ironworks	1870	____ (1862-1895); ____ (1895–present)	100 (1862-1895); 150 (1895–present)	1 screw. Steam power (1862-1914); hot bulb engine (1914-present)	Built for Peruvian Government. Originally intended to be a gunboat, but no guns were ever installed. In passenger service by 1873. Leased to Guillermo Speedie from 1874 to 1883. Leased to Juan L. Thorndike from 1883 to 1887. Purchased by the Peruvian Corporation in 1890. Converted to a tanker in 1957. Laid up in 1959. Parts of hot bulb engine vandalized thereafter. Transferred to ENAFER in 1972. Transferred to Peruvian Coast Guard and renamed Chucuito in 1976. Sold to La Asociación Yavari and renamed back to Yavarí in 1987. Reverted to a non-tanker thereafter. Re-floated in 1999. 1914 hot bulb engine restored back to operation in 2015.	
Zuñiga I	18__	[made in England]	187_	____	__	Steam engine, 1 screw	Bucket Dredge. Used to dredge the channel between Puno Bay and the main part of the lake. [¿disposition?]	
Zuñiga II	1938	Fleming & Ferguson No. 548	1939	170	90	1 double expansion steam engine, 1 screw	Bucket Dredge. Maximum of 16 crewmembers. Built for the Peruvian Corporation. Transferred to ENAFER in 1972. To PeruRail in 1999. Used to dredge the channel between Puno Bay and the main part of the lake.	
______	197_	________	[by 1976]	____	___	Motor Launch	Owned by ENAFER in 1976 and 1978. Off roster by 1998.	
______	197_	________	[by 1976]	____	___	Motor Launch	Owned by ENAFER in 1976 and 1978. Off roster by 1998.	

passim

== See also ==
- Rail transport in Peru

== Bibliography ==
- Whetham, Robert D. (2007). Railways of Peru, Volume 1 – The Northern Lines. Skipton, North Yorkshire: Trackside Publications. ISBN 978-1-900095-31-0.
- Whetham, Robert D. (2008). Railways of Peru, Volume 2 – The Central and Southern Lines. Skipton, North Yorkshire: Trackside Publications. ISBN 978-1-900095-36-5.
- Albé, Alessandro (1995). Eisenbahnen in Peru. Bahn im Bild. Vol. 111. Wien: Verlag Pospischil.
- Fisher, Charles E. (1964). American Locomotive Company Record of Construction Numbers. Railway & Locomotive Historical Society., reproduced in, American Steam Locomotive Builders Lists (2010). Tap Lines.
- Inventory of Locomotives and Rolling Stock (1999), §§3.1, 3.2, “Material Tractivo, Material Rodante de Concesion,” at pp. 93–96, Anexo No. 3, Proceso de Promoción de la Inversión Privada en Enafer S.A.: Contrato de Concesión [“Concession Tractive Stock, Rolling Stock,” Annex No. 3, Process for the Promotion of Private Investment in Enafer, S.A.: Concession Contract] (July 19, 1999), contract file pp. 2122–25, at, https://portal.mtc.gob.pe/transportes/concesiones/documentos/contarto%20ferrocarril%20sur%20y%20sur%20oriente.pdf (Mar. 24, 2021). See, also, contract file pp. 2052, 2035 (details of Titicaca Lake vessels Manco Capac, Ollanta, and dredge Zuñiga).
