= Venice Simplon-Orient-Express =

Private European luxury train service

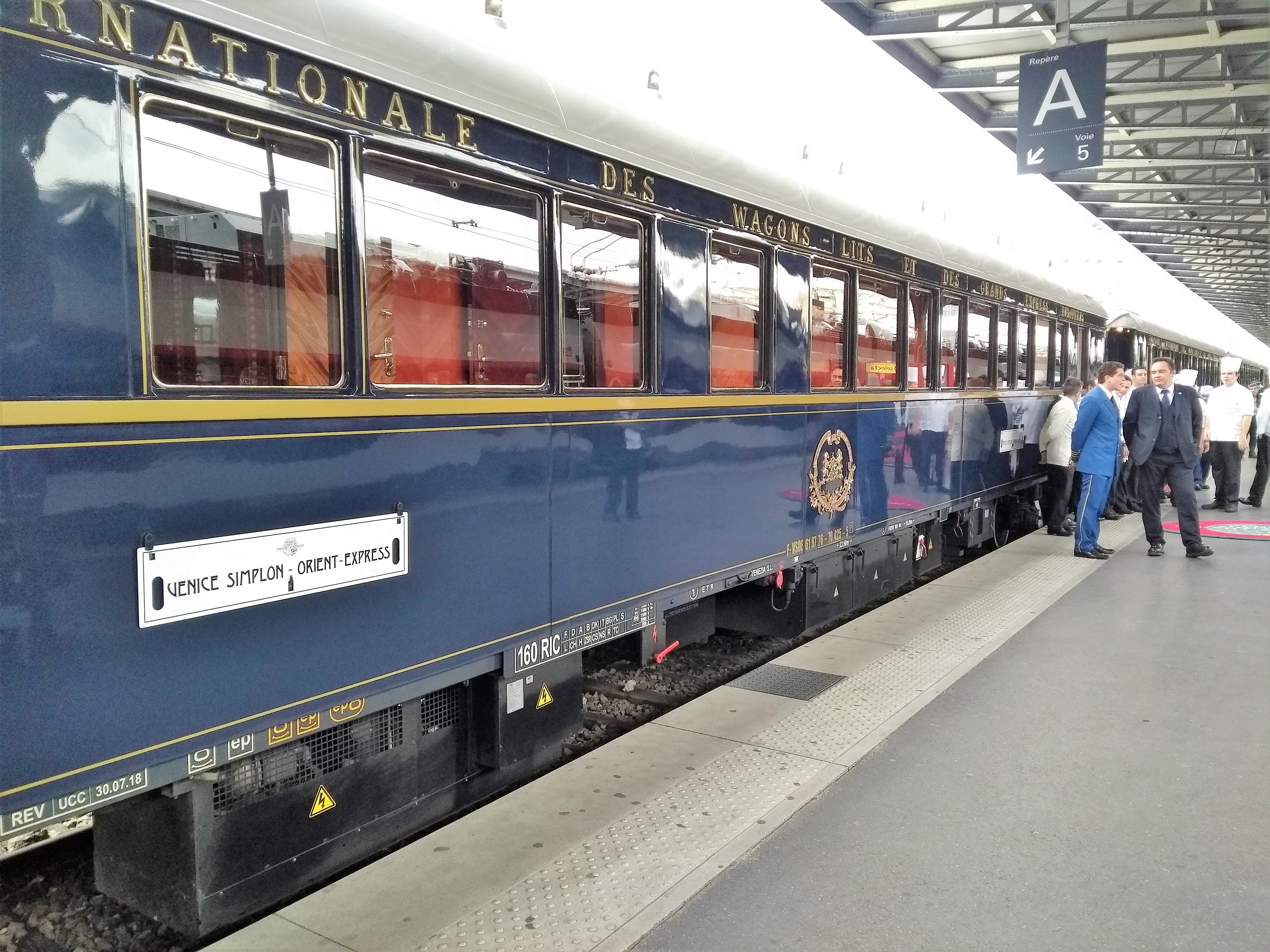

Overview
- Franchise: Railtour
- Main services: Venice Simplon-Orient-Express; Belmond British Pullman; Belmond Royal Scotsman; Eastern & Oriental Express; Belmond Andean Explorer
- Fleet: Continental train: 18 carriages; UK train: 9 carriages
- Parent company: Belmond
- Dates of operation: 25 May 1982–present (first revenue service)

Other
- Website: Official website

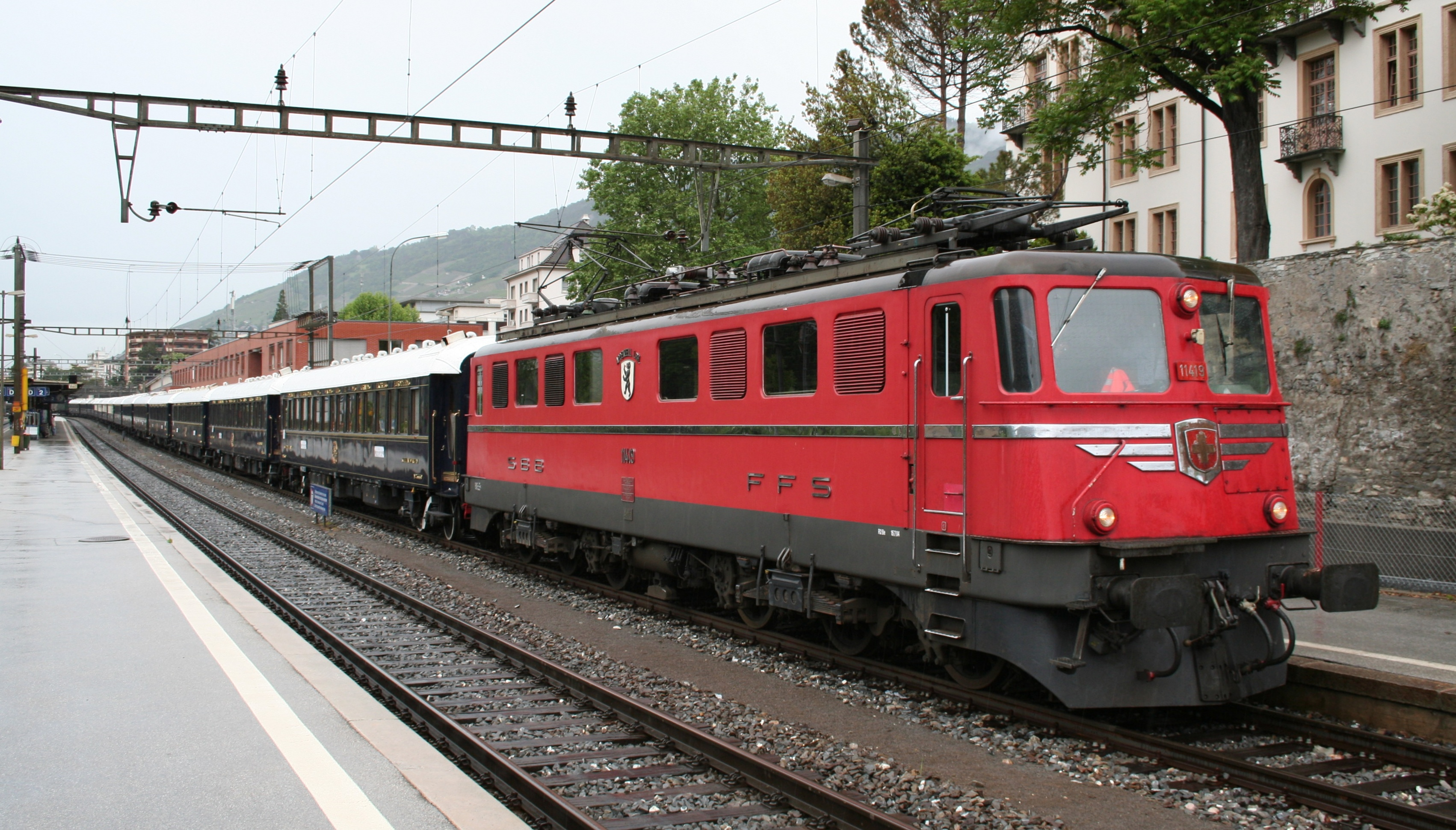
An Ae 6/6 locomotive of the SBB is seen pulling the train through Sierre, Switzerland.

The Venice Simplon-Orient-Express (VSOE) is a private luxury train service from London to Venice and other European cities. It is currently owned by Belmond.

These VSOE services are not to be confused with a regularly scheduled train called the Orient Express, which ran nightly between Paris and Bucharest – in the last years of operation cut back to between Strasbourg and Vienna – until 11 December 2009. This latter was a normal EuroNight sleeper train and was the lineal descendant of the original Orient Express daily departure from Paris to Vienna and the Balkans. While this descendant train was primarily used for every sort of passengers to Central and Eastern Europe, applying only the standard international train fares, the VSOE train is aimed at tourists looking to take a luxury train ride. Fares on the Venice Simplon-Orient-Express are high as the service is intended not as an ordinary rail service, but as a leisure event with five-star dining included. As of July 2024, The New York Times reported that the annual five-night Paris–Istanbul journey cost £35,000 for a solo traveller in the smallest cabin.

The train was established in 1982 by James Sherwood of Kentucky, United States. In 1977 he had bought two original carriages at an auction when the Compagnie Internationale des Wagons-Lits withdrew from the Orient Express service, passing the service on to the national railways of France, Germany, and Austria. Over the next few years, Sherwood spent a total of US$16 million purchasing 35 sleeper, restaurant and Pullman carriages. On 25 May 1982, the first London–Venice run was made.

The VSOE has separate restored carriages for use in the UK and for mainland Europe, but all of the same vintage, mostly dating from the 1920s and 1930s. Passengers are conveyed across the English Channel by coach on the Eurotunnel shuttle through the Channel Tunnel. In the UK Pullman carriages are used; in continental Europe sleeping cars and dining cars of the former Compagnie Internationale des Wagons-Lits are used. Sleeper carriages currently have four levels of accommodation available: Historic Cabins, Suites, Grand Suites and the private carriage "L'Observatoire".

== Destinations ==
VSOE runs services between March and November. The classical London – Paris – Milan – Venice (and return) route via the Simplon Tunnel was altered in 1984 to serve Zürich, Innsbruck, and Verona through the Brenner Pass. At the end of the 2010s an asymmetrical route was introduced, providing Geneva instead of Zürich, and the classical Simplon route eastbound, but sometimes also through the Gotthard pass. This journey is offered once or twice a week, depending on other trips. Two or three times a year Prague, Vienna, and Budapest are also accessed and traditionally once a year - particularly in the turn of August/September - the train goes to Istanbul via Budapest, Sinaia and Bucharest – in the last three cities a sightseeing tour (and in the two capitals an overnight stay in a hotel) also takes place.

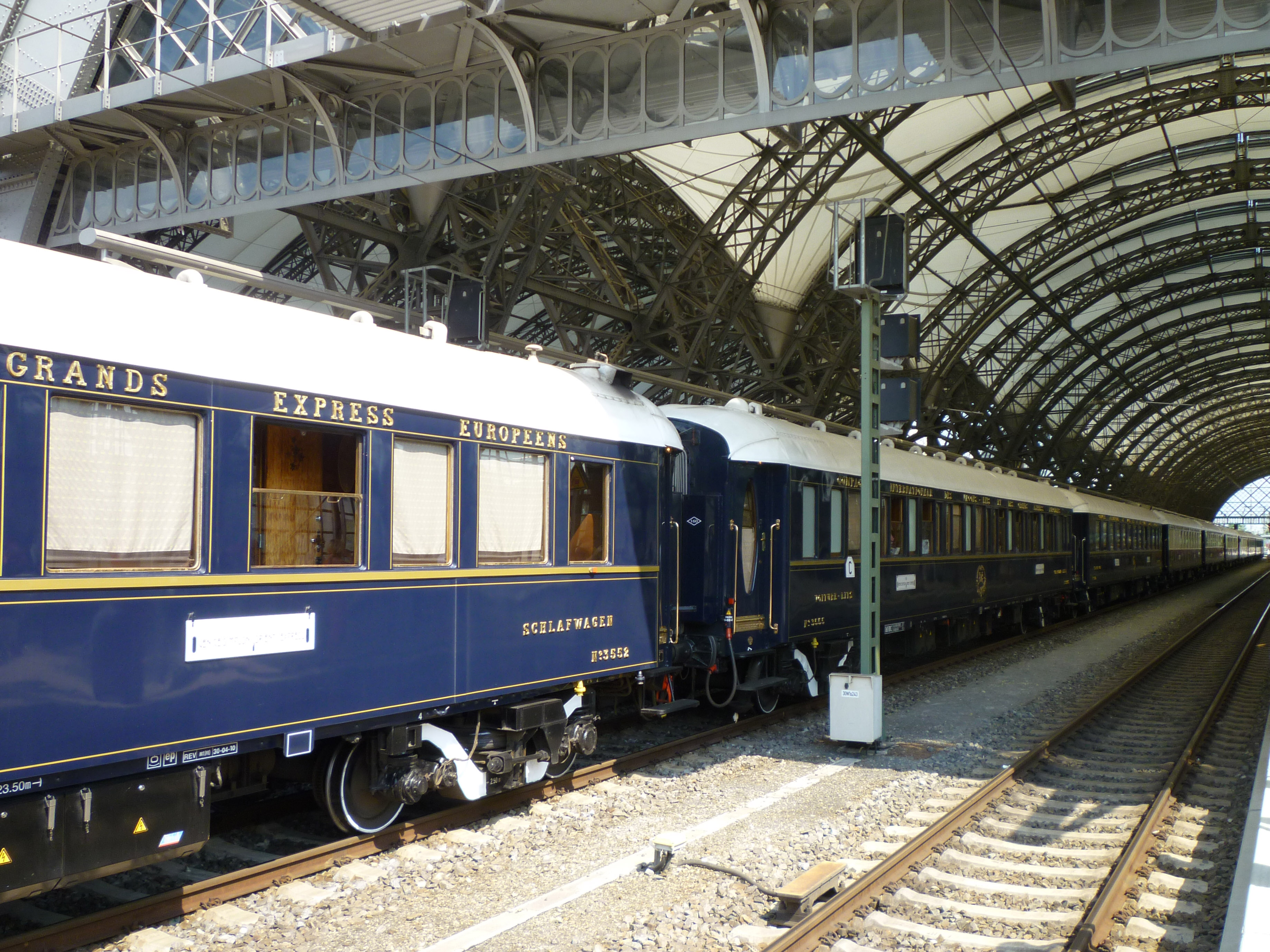
Venice Simplon-Orient-Express at Dresden station

While these routes are available nearly every year, the Istanbul trip has been cancelled occasionally, due to political or health issues. Some seasons have also included unique destinations in Switzerland (Lucerne), Germany (Cologne, Berlin, Dresden), Slovakia (Banská Bystrica and the High Tatras), Poland (Warsaw, Malbork, Kraków) and even Scandinavia (Copenhagen, Stockholm). Such special journeys are currently provided to Cannes, Rome, Florence, Brussels and Amsterdam. Many of these trips – together with Prague, Vienna and Budapest used to have different starting and final stations, either beginning in Venice and ending in Paris/London or vice versa (as the Istanbul trip), but as of 2022 the routes feature either Paris (Prague, Vienna, Budapest, Istanbul) or Venice (Amsterdam, Brussels) in both directions.

== Mainland Europe train ==
The VSOE continental leg contains 18 carriages – 12 sleeping cars, three dining cars, a bar car and two former Ytb class sleepers, which provide accommodation for the staff and storage rooms for luggage and supplies as well. The ten Lx class sleepers have nine double compartments, while the two S1 class sleepers used to accommodate 17 passengers in four double and nine single compartments. As a higher service class Cabin Suites were offered until 2020, featuring two inter-connected compartments, one for sleeping, other for sitting. In March 2018 the Grand Suite class was introduced with the refitting of the S1 sleeping car No. 3425. The Grand Suites (bearing the names Paris, Istanbul and Venice) include double or twin bed layouts and a drawing saloon with a sofa (which is convertible to a third bed) and en-suite bathroom. Three further Grand Suites (Prague, Budapest and Vienna) in the second S1 sleeping car No. 3309 were meant to be introduced to the service in March 2020, but postponed to 2021 due to the COVID-19 pandemic. In June 2023 the Suite class was introduced featuring a similar layout, however with convertible beds (double and twin either) due to the lack of the drawing saloon. The design is related to the Grand Suites, with compartment names referring to famous landmarks around the train's route: La Forêt (The Forest, inspired by Black Forest), La Campagne (The Countryside, with an emphasis on the vineyards of France and Northern Italy), Les Montagnes (The Mountains, particularly Arlberg), and Les Lacs (The Lakes, among them Lake Zug and Lake Como). Four such compartments - one of each design per carriage - were installed in the Lx carriages 3552, 3555 and two years later also in 3539 and 3543. The remaining conventional compartments are currently sold as Historic Cabins. In 2024 Lx 3553 was rebuilt as private carriage L'Observatoire, containing a bedroom for two with bathtub, a lounge, a library, and a bathroom. The interior design was done by French artist JR. The carriage was exhibited in April 2024 at the Venice Biennale to provide first impressions and inaugurated in October 2024, however the first public rides with passengers are provided only since 2025.

The Lx sleeping cars were refurbished in Ostend by the CIWL workshops, while the rest at the Hansa carriage works in Bremen. The renovation was made with some technical modifications, to match today's safety and comfort requests, for example the dining cars were fitted with modern kitchens. They have also become air-conditioned, which was introduced in 2017 even in the sleeping cars. In the mid-2000s the original bogies were changed to brand new ones to achieve higher speeds (160 km/h instead of 140 km/h).

In 2022 and 2023, due to the delayed inspection of the staff sleepers, a Trenitalia couchette car was added as a substitute, but only on the classic Calais–Venice route and to Amsterdam.

=== Fleet list ===
Carriage type	CIWL number	Built by	Year of construction	Designer and design	Notice
Sleeping car type "S1"	3309	Ateliers Métallurgiques de Nivelles	1927	Originally: René Prou, floral motives Grand Suites: Wimberly Interiors	2019-2020 refurbished with "Grand Suite" compartments
Sleeping car type "S1"	3425	Birmingham Railway Carriage and Wagon Company	1929	Originally: René Prou, leaf motives Grand Suites: Wimberly Interiors	2017-2018 refurbished with "Grand Suite" compartments
Sleeping car type "Lx"	3473	Metropolitan Carriage Wagon and Finance Co Ltd	1929	Morrison, "flower garland" motives	Steward's compartment included
Sleeping car type "Lx"	3482	Metropolitan Carriage Wagon and Finance Co Ltd	1929	Morrison, "trapeze" motives	Steward's compartment included
Sleeping car type "Lx"	3483	Metropolitan Carriage Wagon and Finance Co Ltd	1929	Morrison, "flower basket" motives	Steward's compartment included
Sleeping car type "Lx"	3525	Entreprises Industrielles Charentaises	1929	René Prou, Sapelli pearl	
Sleeping car type "Lx"	3539	Entreprises Industrielles Charentaises	1929	René Prou, Sapelli pearl Suites: Wimberly Interiors	Steward's compartment included, 2023–2024 refurbished with "Suite" compartments
Sleeping car type "Lx"	3543	Entreprises Industrielles Charentaises	1929	René Prou, Sapelli pearl Suites: Wimberly Interiors	2023–2025 refurbished with "Suite" compartments
Sleeping car type "Lx"	3544	Entreprises Industrielles Charentaises	1929	René Prou, Sapelli pearl	
Sleeping car type "Lx"	3552	Entreprises Industrielles Charentaises	1929	Originally: Nelson, tiger lily Suites: Wimberly Interiors	Steward's compartment included, 2022–2023 refurbished with "Suite" compartments
Sleeping car type "Lx"	3553	Entreprises Industrielles Charentaises	1929	Originally: Nelson, tiger lily L'Observatoire: JR	Steward's compartment included, 2023–2024 refurbished as "L'Observatoire" private carriage
Sleeping car type "Lx"	3555	Entreprises Industrielles Charentaises	1929	Originally: Nelson, tiger lily Suites: Wimberly Interiors	Steward's compartment included, 2022–2023 refurbished with "Suite" compartments
Bar car	3674	Entreprises Industrielles Charentaises	1931	Gérard Gallet	Originally a dining car, redesigned as bar car
Sleeping car type "Ytb"	3912	Ateliers Métallurgiques de Nivelles	1949		Refitted with staff sleeping compartments and storage rooms
Sleeping car type "Ytb"	3915	Ateliers Métallurgiques de Nivelles	1949		Refitted with staff sleeping compartments and storage rooms
Dining car	4095	Birmingham Railway Carriage and Wagon Company	1927		L'Oriental, Interior originally in dining car No. 3583
Dining car	4110	Birmingham Railway Carriage and Wagon Company	1927		Étoile du Nord
Pullman dining car	4141	Entreprises Industrielles Charentaises	1929	René Lalique	Côte d'Azur, fitted with a champagne bar

=== Locomotives ===
Through 40 years the train had no dedicated motive power, haulage was provided in every country by the respective state railways with conventional electric and diesel locomotives designated for express and InterCity trains. The only known steam traction took place 2017 in Hungary - however, only within Budapest - by a MÁV Class 424. Since 2023 the new FS subsidiary Treni Turistici Italiani has become the train operator, which means a particular (but not exclusive) usage of their own E402 class engines featuring a historic-looking livery. One year later SNCF has also introduced two BB 26000 class locomotives No. 26005 and 26009 in a dark blue "Trains spéciaux" livery, however, they also appear with other trains, while VSOE kept on being hauled by other vehicles of this class as well.

Since Amsterdam has become a destinaton, the company Train Charter has become the first private carrier of the VSOE. First in Belgium and Netherlands, using the locomotives of the private freight operator Lineas, since 2026 also in Germany and Austria. As of March 2026 within Austria Vectrons were rented by Graz-Köflacher Bahn, which have leased them from Beacon Rail.

== British train ==
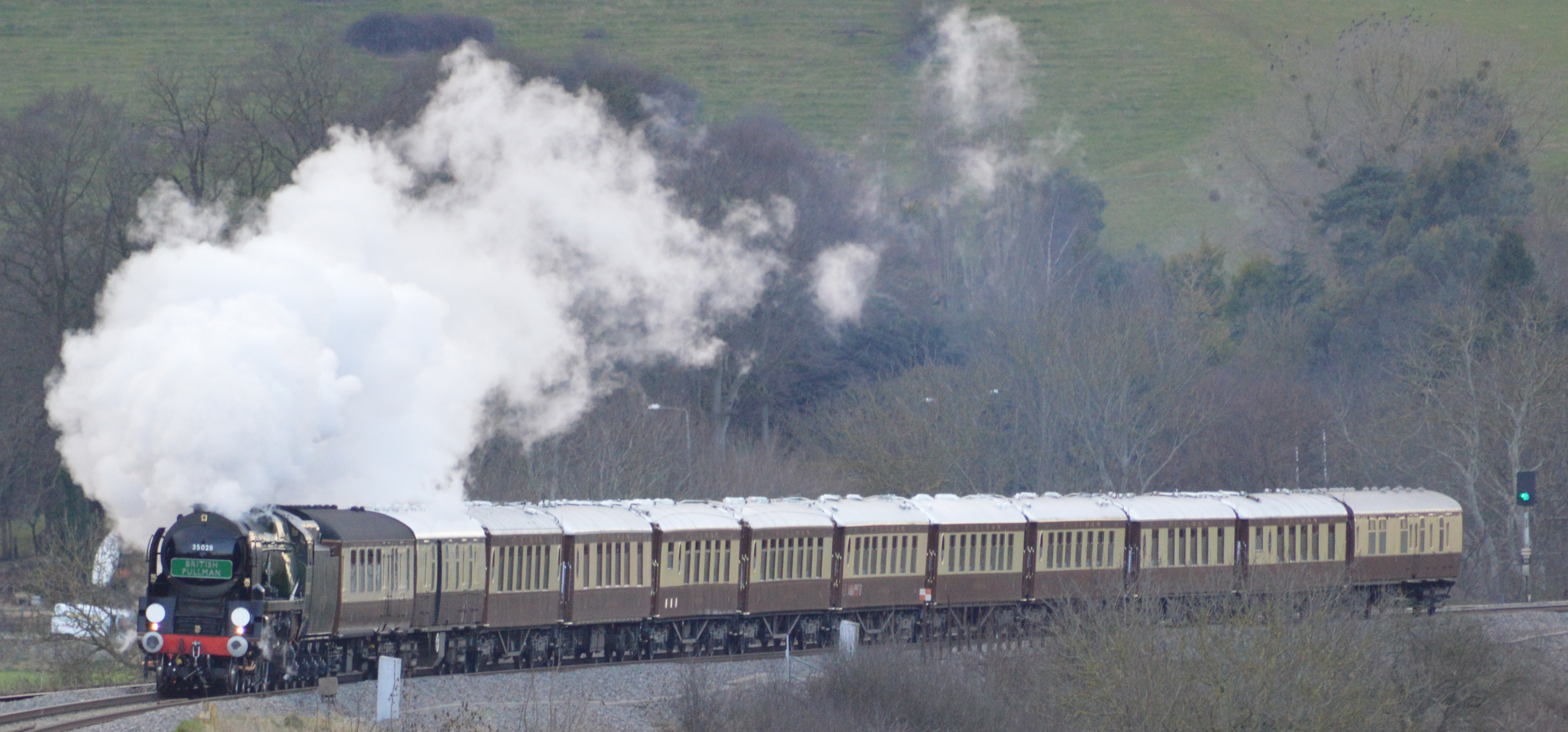
35028 Clan Line hauling the 'British Pullman' in 2013, west of Bath.

VSOE operates services within Great Britain separate from its main continental services as an open access operator. The Belmond British Pullman (which runs the London to Folkestone Harbour leg of the Venice Simplon-Orient-Express) consists mainly of former Brighton Belle Pullman coaches. It operates services mainly in the South of England and the Midlands, with York as its most northerly terminus. Usually operating from Victoria Station in London, specials run throughout the south of London to historic sites, including elaborate dining along the way. On 9 October 2007, the Westfield Group rented the whole train to open its new shopping centre in Derby, departing from the former LNER London King's Cross station.

== In popular culture ==
The film Mission Impossible - Dead Reckoning Part One features the VSOE, running to Innsbruck, as the location of the final fight scene.

== Other related luxury trains ==
The Northern Belle was a more extensive day service operating throughout Great Britain, as far north as Inverness and south to Plymouth. It was in service and design closely resembling to the UK Pullman train, but composed of more modern British Rail Mark 2 and Mark 1 carriages. It was introduced in 2000, and sold 2017 by Belmond to private owners, who continue to operate it in the same manner.

The Royal Scotsman, first introduced in 1985, was taken over by Belmond in 2005. This overnight luxury train provides journeys through Scotland northbound from Edinburgh and Glasgow with its refitted East Coast Main Line Mark 1 Pullman carriages.

Inspired by this train, the Grand Hibernian was made of Irish Mark 3 carriages, and entered in service in August 2016 for trips in Ireland and Northern Ireland, but ceased in February 2021. The carriages were transferred 2022 to Great Britain, and later converted for the new luxury service Britannic Explorer, which is scheduled to start in July 2025.

The company also operate services in Southeast Asia (the Eastern & Oriental Express between Bangkok and Singapore) and Peru (PeruRail). Between 1998 and 2003, a service on the East Coast of Australia named the Great South Pacific Express was also run. Those cars remained in storage in Australia after the service ceased, and transferred in 2016 to Peru for the Belmond Andean Explorer overnight train from Cusco to the Lake Titicaca and Arequipa. Since then the former day train with the same name and on the same route (however, only between Cusco and the Lake Titicaca) is featured as Titicaca Train. It has Pullman dining carriages and a bar car with observatory platform, like the Hiram Bingham train, which serves the narrow-gauge line towards Machu Picchu.

== Media coverage ==
- British travel journalist Alan Whicker joined the inaugural service in 1982, interviewing invited guests and celebrities along the way for his Whicker's World TV series.
- Comedian Michael Palin travelled on the train on the first leg of his journey Around the World in 80 Days in 1988, during which time he was accommodated in sleeping carriage 3544.
- Actor David Suchet, best known for playing Hercule Poirot in a long-running series of television films adapting all of Agatha Christie's Poirot stories, including Murder on the Orient Express, hosts the Masterpiece Mystery episode "David Suchet on the Orient Express" about a real trip on this train which originally aired on 7 July 2010.

== See also ==
- Rail transport in Europe
- Orient Express (Accor)
