= ALCO RSD-39 =

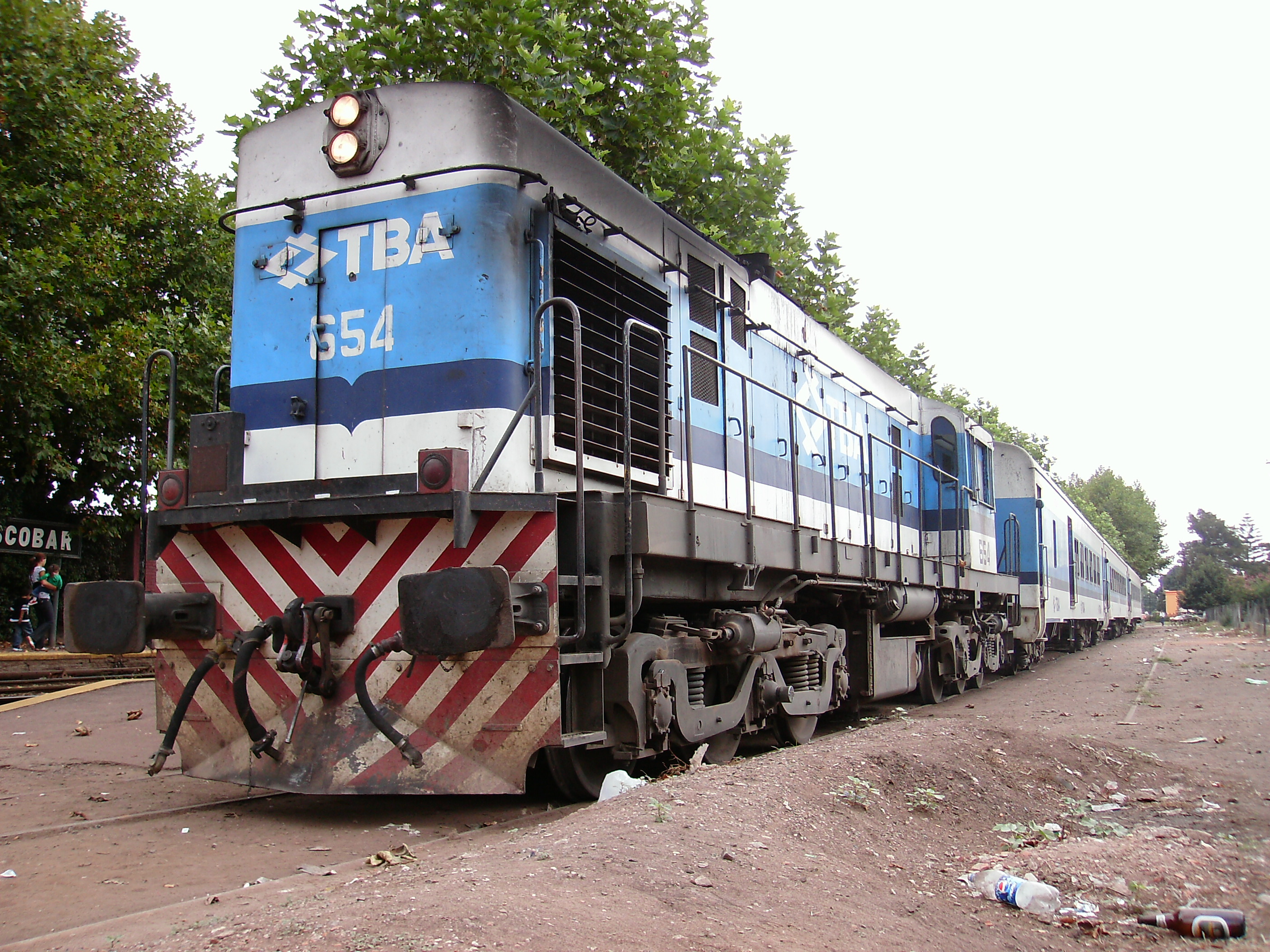
Type and origin
- Power type: Diesel-electric
- Builder: ALCO
- Model: DL535
- Build date: 1965-1967
- Total produced: 76
Specifications
- Prime mover: ALCO 6-251D
Performance figures
- Maximum speed: 120 km/h (75 mph)
- Power output: 1,350 hp (1.01 MW)

The ALCO RSD-39 was a six axle, low axle weight diesel-electric locomotive built by ALCO and under license by Euskalduna.

Fifty units were built for Alco between 1965 and 1967 for Renfe, forming part of Renfe Class 313. Other versions were exported to railways in South America.

== Original buyers ==
Railroad	Quantity	Road numbers	Notes
FC Guayaquil a Quito	10	160-169	
FC del Sur del Perú	11	350-360	
ENAFER	3	433-435	
ENAFER Red Sur-Oriente	2	484-485	
Renfe	50	1301-1350	Originally as Renfe Class 1300, later reclassified Renfe Class 313 exported to Portugal (CP 1320) and to Argentina, for Trenes de Buenos Aires (TBA)
