= Eastern & Oriental Express =

Train service in mainland Southeast Asia

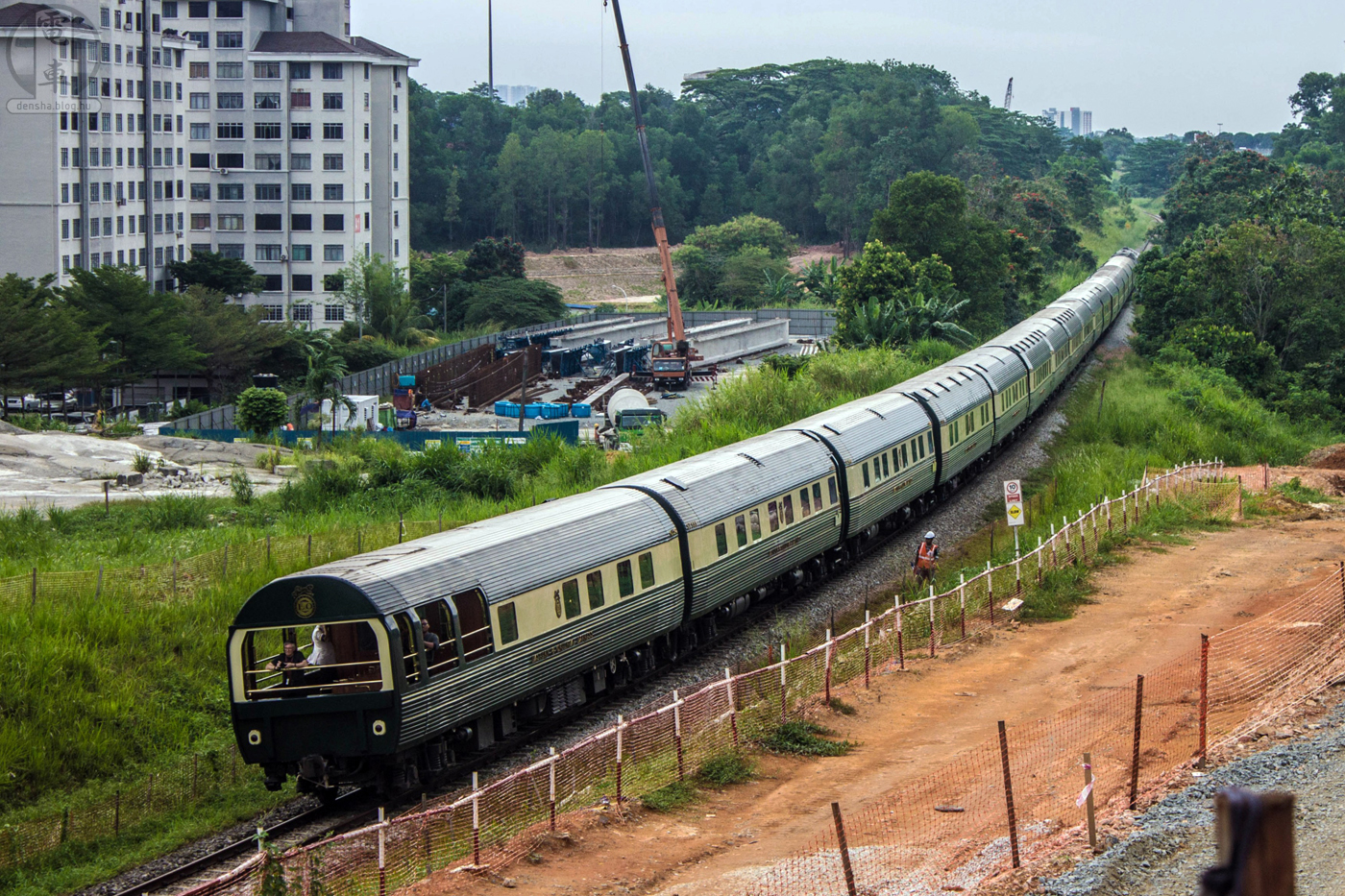

Overview
- Service type: Excursion train
- Status: Operational
- Locale: Mainland Southeast Asia
- Current operator: Belmond Limited
- Website: Official website

Route
- Termini: Woodlands Train Checkpoint

Technical
- Rolling stock: 31 rail carriages
- Track gauge: 1,000 mm (3 ft 3 3/8 in) metre gauge
- Operating speed: 100 km/h (62 mph)
- Track owner: Keretapi Tanah Melayu

The Eastern & Oriental Express is a luxury cruise train that carries passengers between Singapore, Malaysia, and Thailand.

The train is operated by Belmond Limited. As of 2024, only two seasonal routes are operated between Singapore and Malaysia.

Fares on the Singapore to Malaysia train in 2024 (four days, three nights) start at US$3,140. All meals were included in the travelling fare but alcoholic drinks cost extra.

== History ==
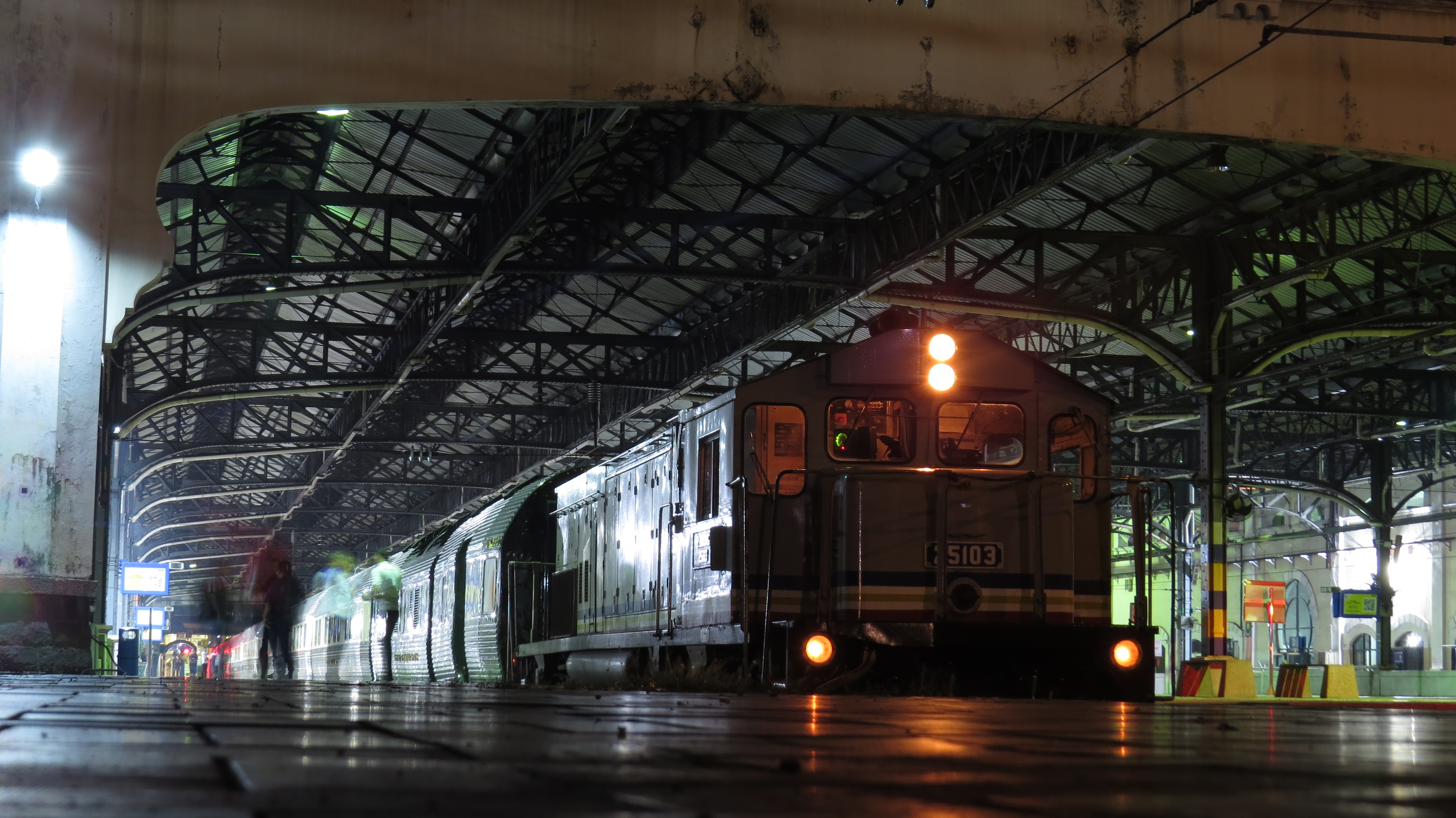
Eastern & Oriental Express hauled by KTM Class 25 locomotive, stopping at Kuala Lumpur station for crew change.

An agreement were made and signed in 1991 between Orient-Express Hotels and the Malaysian railway authority, Keretapi Tanah Melayu and Thailand railway authority, State Railway of Thailand to operate Eastern & Oriental Express on their tracks. On 19 September 1993, the Eastern & Oriental Express made its inaugural journey between Tanjong Pagar Railway Station and Bangkok, stopping at Kuala Lumpur, Butterworth, and Kanchanaburi, taking 4 days (3 nights). During the introduction, it runs approximately 32 trips that either embark upon or disembark from Bangkok or Woodlands yearly between September and April.

Starting 23 February 2010, the train has also travelled between Bangkok and Vientiane, the capital city of Laos. Under the name 'Voyage to Vientiane', the train made its four days and three nights journey that crosses through northeast of Thailand borders, passing through Khao Yai valley and Mekong River, followed by a full day tour at Vientiane, Laos and returned to Bangkok across Friendship Bridge.

In 2020, the train service were suspended due to COVID-19 pandemic, leading to the total lockdown on all international travels.

In July 2023, Belmond announced that Eastern & Oriental Express will be relaunched in 2024, with two routes operating on season around Malaysia. Booking opened in September 2023, with inaugural relaunch commenced on 12 February 2024.

== Rolling stock ==
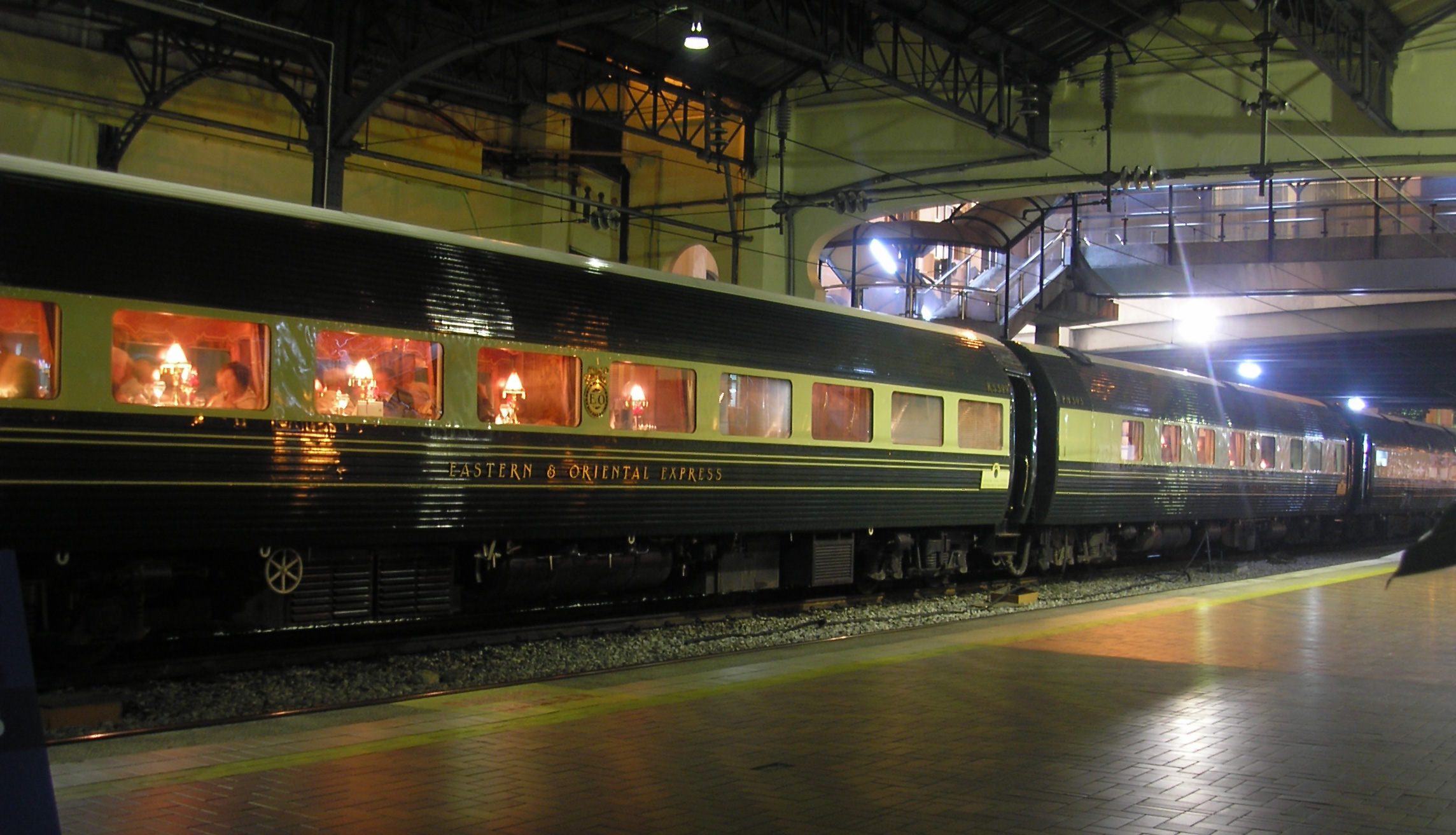
A Bangkok-bound Eastern & Oriental Express train at the old Kuala Lumpur railway station, Malaysia.

The train was built by Hitachi and Nippon Sharyo in Japan in 1972 and operated as the Silver Star in New Zealand. All 31 carriages were later brought by visionary businessman James B. Sherwood, the founder of Orient-Express Hotels, which in 2014 changed its name to Belmond Limited. Twenty-four carriages were regauged from New Zealand's 1,067 mm (3 ft 6 in) gauge to 1,000 mm gauge for Thai and Malaysian railway lines by A & G Price of Thames, New Zealand. An extensive internal rebuild and fit-out plus exterior painting and badging was undertaken by the new owners at their (then) newly constructed maintenance depot on KTMB land in Singapore's Keppel Road rail yards (later at Plentong railway station in Johor, Malaysia). The design of the remodelling was by Gérard Gallet, the man behind much of the design and refurbishment of other Belmond products such as the Belmond British Pullman and the Venice-Simplon Orient Express.

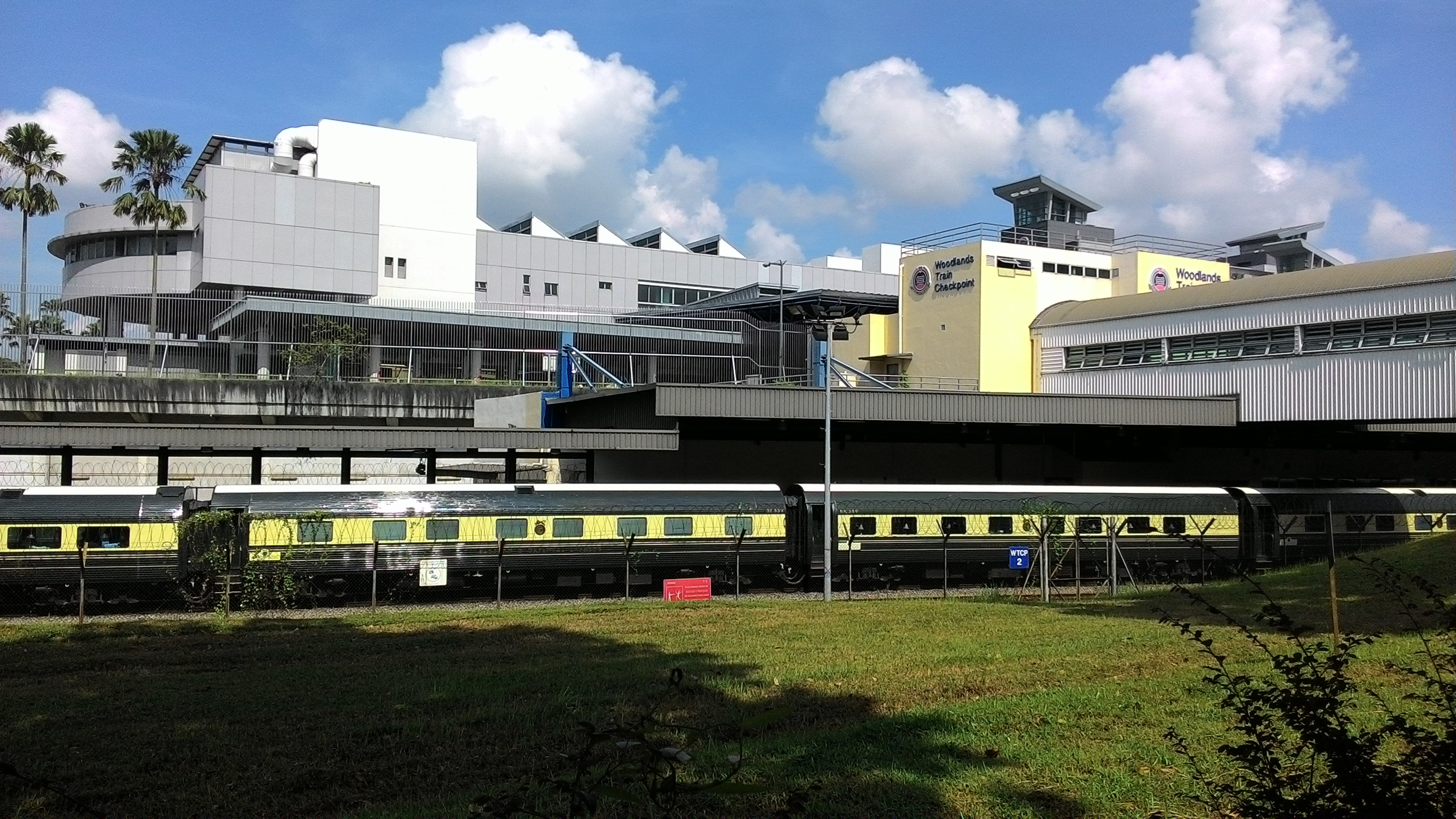
Eastern & Oriental Express train arriving at Woodlands Train Checkpoint, Singapore.

The train consists following carriages, from which only a maximum of 21 are operated at once. Since the relaunch vehicles with numbers in italics are not operated in the train, and the maximum length was reduced to 16 vehicles per train.

- six Pullman sleeping cars (SD 313, SD 318, SD 322, SD 323, SD 328, SD 388), which have six cabins with bunk-bed or single occupation - this comfort category is not offered on the six-night program
- seven State sleeping cars (ST 312, ST 332, ST 333, ST 362, ST 363, ST 366, ST 368), which have four twin-bed compartments
- a Presidential sleeping car (SP 369) with two twin-bed cabins - more spacious bedrooms and bathrooms than State cabins
- three dining cars (RS 381, RS 392, RS 399) with kitchen and tables that seat two or four - however only one or two carriages running in a train
- one bar car (BR 389) with piano and another one (OB 398) with a large open-air observation deck
- a spa car (PN 393) with gift shop, and two spa compartments - before 2020 a saloon car with library roomand additional dinner seating facilities
- two staff sleeping cars (SE 338, SE 339)
- a power car (GR 336)

The train is fully air-conditioned, and each compartment has an en-suite bathroom with shower and toilets. Haulage is provided by KTM diesel engines.

The layout of many carriages and the comfort classes were also used for the designing of the Great South Pacific Express (now to be used as Belmond Andean Explorer).

== Train schedule ==
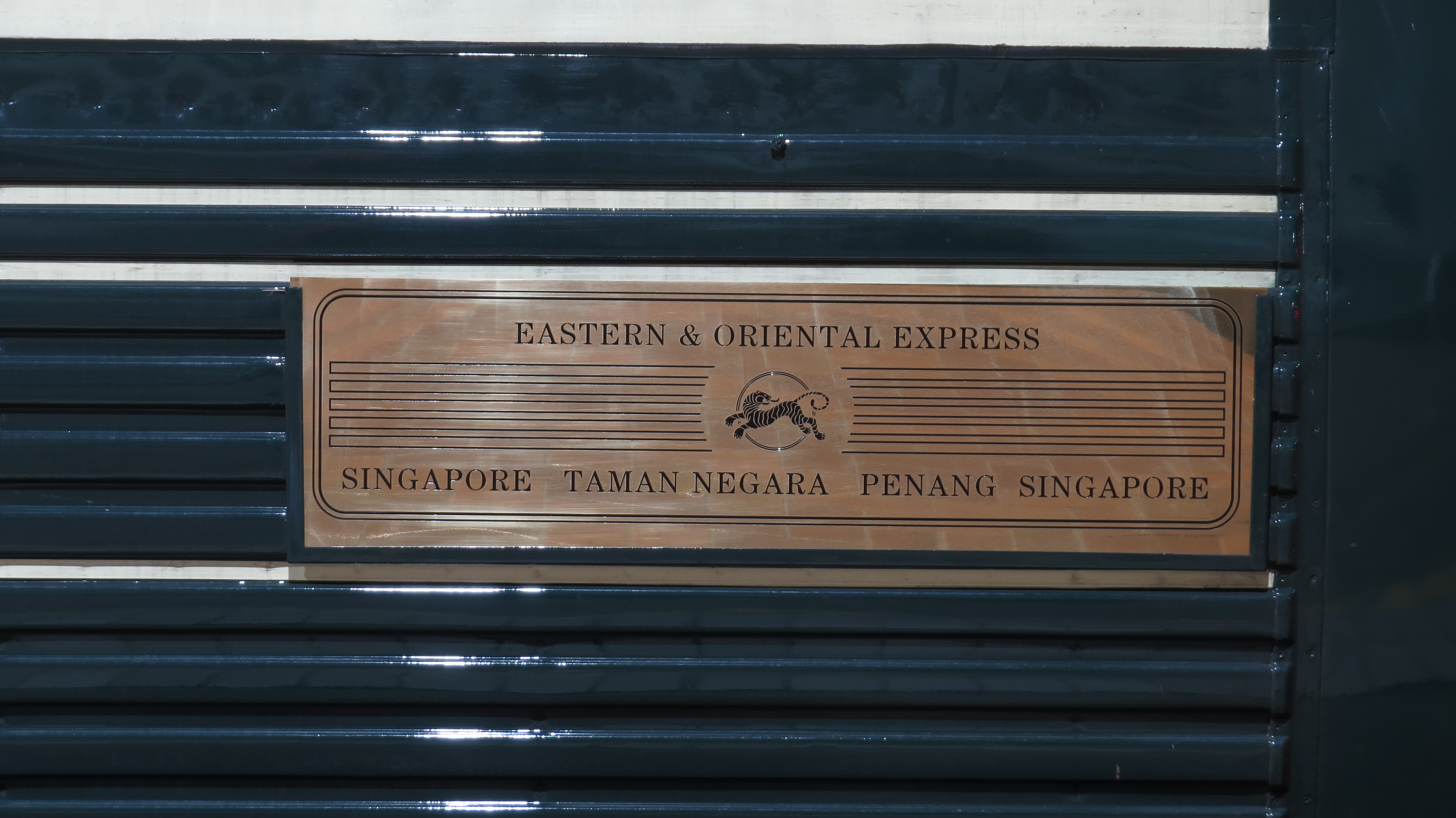
Signage for Wild Malaysia route on Eastern & Oriental Express train.

As of 2024, the Eastern & Oriental Express operates two seasonal routes in 4 days 3 nights cruise tour. Both routes starts and ends from Woodlands, with several stops for guided tour around Malaysia.

=== Essence of Malaysia ===
This route operates between November and February. Guests will bring on a tour to Pulau Payar in Langkawi and Penang on 4 days and 3 nights of tour.

Day	Location	Arrive	Depart
1	Singapore Woodlands Train Checkpoint	-	15:20
2	Alor Setar (guided tour to Pulau Payar, Langkawi)	12:49	19:00
3	Butterworth (guided tour to George Town, Penang)	22:15 (day 2)	13:30
4	Singapore Woodlands Train Checkpoint	10:20	-

=== Wild Malaysia ===
This route operates between March and October, and guest will bring on a tour to Taman Negara in Pahang and Penang on 4 days and 3 nights of tour.

Day	Location	Arrive	Depart
1	Singapore Woodlands Train Checkpoint - Gemas	-	15:20
2	Merapoh (guided tour to Taman Negara, Pahang)	TBA	TBA
3	Butterworth (guided tour to George Town, Penang)	TBA	TBA
4	Singapore Woodlands Train Checkpoint	10:20	-
