= Matarani =

Peruvian port city

Coordinates: 17°0′0″S 72°6′23″W

Matarani is a port city in Arequipa Region, Peru. It is a major port on the southern coast of Peru. The port is operated by Tisur.

== See also ==
- PeruRail which starts here.
