= Great South Pacific Express =

Australian train service (1999–2003)

Overview
- Service type: Tourist train
- Status: Ceased
- First service: 23 April 1999
- Last service: June 2003
- Former operators: Queensland Rail (90%); Orient-Express Hotels (10%)

Technical
- Track gauge: 1,067 mm (3 ft 6 in); 1,435 mm (4 ft 8 1/2 in) standard gauge

The Great South Pacific Express was a luxury Australian train service, operated by Queensland Rail and Belmond Limited, the operator of the Venice-Simplon Orient Express.

== History ==
In December 1996, Queensland Rail announced it would enter a 90/10 joint venture with Orient-Express Hotels to operate a luxury tourist train between Kuranda (near Cairns) and Sydney. It commenced operating in April 1999. The train accommodated 100 passengers in up to 21 carriages, at a cost of $3,500 to $5,500 depending on type of accommodation. The train also made occasional excursions to Canberra, Melbourne, the Blue Mountains and the Hunter Valley.

The service ceased in June 2003, having run up losses of around $12 million over four years.

After the demise of the service the carriages were sold to Orient-Express Hotels for an undisclosed price in 2005, for use on its trains overseas. Twenty of the carriages remained in storage at the North Ipswich Railway Workshops, with Queensland Rail stating an Orient Express holding company owned them, while an Orient Express Hotels manager in London said they were still owned by Queensland Rail.

In 2013, the Queensland Government approached the Venice-Simplon Orient Express for permission to operate the remaining carriages on tours in Queensland.

In February 2016, the carriages were moved from the Workshops Rail Museum at Ipswich to the Port of Brisbane for shipment to Peru for use by the Orient Express Hotels' successor, Belmond, and its partly-owned railroad company PeruRail. The train entered service in May 2017 as the Belmond Andean Explorer, carrying passengers from Cusco to Puno (at the Lake Titicaca) and to Arequipa.

== Rolling stock ==
The 21 carriages were built at the Queensland Rail workshops in Townsville for $35 million. They were built to operate on both the narrow 1,067 mm (3 ft 6 in) gauge in Queensland and 1,435 mm (4 ft 8 1/2 in) standard gauge in New South Wales with the train undergoing a bogie exchange en route at Acacia Ridge.

The train consisted of sleeping cars in three different comfort levels (Pullman, State and Commissioner Suites), two dining cars, two bar cars (one of them with an open-air observation deck), a power car and staff sleepers. The entire train layout was designed similar to the Eastern & Oriental Express, but with a different interior style.
