= Belmond Andean Explorer =

South American luxury sleeper train

The Belmond Andean Explorer, launched in May 2017, is South America's first luxury sleeper train. It replaced the eponymous Pullman day train which ran between Cusco and Puno, on Lake Titicaca. With the new train, this trip is converted to a one-night journey, and extended from Puno for another overnight ride to Arequipa in southern Peru.

From Cusco the train climbs to 4,800 metres (15,700 ft) on the Altiplano, before arriving at Lake Titicaca to pause for excursions to the lake's floating islands. It then continues to Arequipa, a city with a UNESCO World Heritage Site centre, stopping en route at Sumbay Caves. It is possible to add on a visit to the Colca Canyon, known for its condors.

The trainset used to serve as the Great South Pacific Express in Australia between 1999 and 2003. The since-mothballed carriages were shipped to Peru in February 2016, where they were refurbished. The three accommodation levels of the GSPE with double, twin and bunk beds, all of them with en-suite bathrooms, have been kept, as well as the two dining and bar cars, and the last car having an open-air observation deck.

Belmond Andean Explorer is owned by PeruRail, and is a 50%/50% joint venture between Belmond and Peruvian investor Lorenzo Sousa Debarbieri, founder and chairman of the board of PeruRail SA. It is operated by PeruRail, which also operates the Hiram Bingham Pullman train running from Cusco to Machu Picchu.

== Belmond Andean Explorer cars ==
Car Number	Car Name	Type of Car	Eponyms
1825	Kiwicha	Sleeping car	Species of Flowering Plant (Quechua)
1826	Totora	Sleeping car	Giant Bulrush Sedge (Quechua)
1830	Ichu	Observation car	Peruvian feathergrass (Quechua)
1831	Coca	Sleeping car	Coca
1832	......	Baggage and power car	......
1834	Capuli	Sleeping car	Species of Fruit Tree (Aztec)
1836	......	Kitchen car	......
1838	Llama	Dining car and train shop	Llama
1839	Maca	Piano bar car	Type of Root Vegetable (Quechua)
1841	Tara	Sleeping car	Species of Small Tree (Quechua)
1843	Tola	Sleeping car	Species of Shrub (Quechua)
1847	Chilca	Sleeping car	Baccharis genistelloides, Dye-Plant (Quechua)
1850	Picaflor	Spa car	Hummingbird (Spanish)
1852	Muña	Dining car	Love; also An Andean Mint Plant (Quechua)
1853	......	Crew car	......
1854	......	Crew car	......
1858	Molle	Sleeping car	Peruvian Pepper Tree (Quechua)
1859	Yareta	Sleeping car	Slow Growing Flowering Plant (Quechua)

(Belmond Andean Explorer cars retained their original Australian numbers. However, Southern Peru-related car names were added.)
