= Lorenzo Sousa Debarbieri =

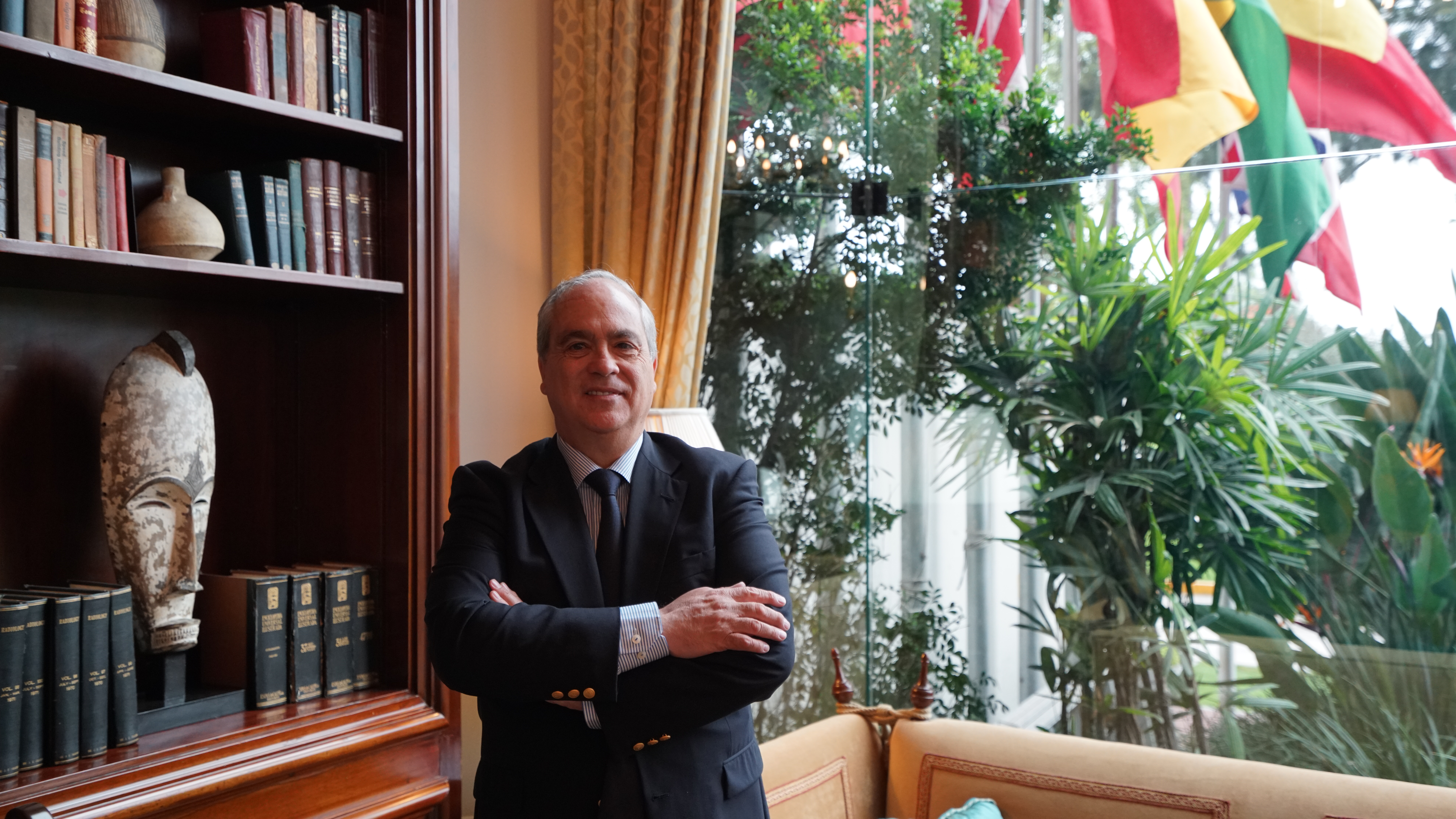
- Born: May 16, 1960 (age 66); Lima, Peru
- Education: Pepperdine University; Harvard University
- Occupations: Economist, writer and entrepreneur.
- Known for: President of PeruRail; President of Peru Belmond Hotel; President of Ferrocarril Trasandino; Founding Partner and Former Chairman of Lan Perú; Shareholder and Director of Banco de Comercio, and Director of first peruvian Celular company Tele 2000
- Parent(s): Lorenzo Sousa Castañeda; Nancy Debarbieri Mantero

Lorenzo Sousa Debarbieri (born May 16, 1960) is an entrepreneur, businessman and author from Lima who oversees large privately held tourism and railway companies in Peru (Peru Belmond Hotels, PeruRail and Ferrocarril Transandino (with a 50% in each one of the three companies in partnership with Belmond Limited).

== Early life ==
Lorenzo was born in Lima, Peru to Lorenzo Sousa Castañeda and Nancy Debarbieri Mantero.

Lorenzo Sousa: Economist, graduated from Pepperdine University, California, with an MBA from the Arthur D. Little Management Education Institute in Cambridge, Massachusetts, U.S.A., followed by postgraduate studies at the Advanced Management Program (PAD) of the University of Piura, Lima, Peru, and the Advanced Management Postgraduate Program at Harvard Business School, Harvard University, Boston. He has also done a number of studies and congresses in the areas of banking, investment, and finance, including Singularity University, a technology program sponsored by NASA and Google.

He started his work life as an executive at Citibank-Lima as a Finance Manager and Financial Control Manager. He also held the position of Citicorp Investment Manager in the Investment Banking department at Citibank-Lima, and with the Arab Latin American Bank (ARLA BANK) as an economist, he was the head of Macro Economics for Latin America. He was a director and shareholder of the Banco de Comercio and telecommunications company Celular 2000 (sold to BellSouth and now Telefónica [Spain]). He was a founding shareholder and the first chairman of the board of the Arequipa Stock Exchange and director of the Lima Stock Exchange.

He was a founding shareholder and chairman of the board of directors of LAN Perú S.A., a joint venture airline with Lan Chile; and Director and shareholder of Peru Hydro, a company that developed two hydroelectric projects along with Statkraft from Norway. A founding member of Peru Holding de Turismo, a tourism company focused on real estate development and listed on the Lima Stock Exchange. Founder and chairman of Peruval SAB, an important stock brokerage house during the 90s, economic boom in Peru. He has also been the Bankers Trust representative for Peru and a founding member of the Harvard Alumni Association of Peru.Currently:President of PERU ORIENT EXPRESS HOTELS (Peru OEH S.A.)/PERU BELMOND HOTELS; chairman of the board of PERU RAIL S.A. a subsidiary company of the Peruval Group; founder of Peruval CORP S.A.; chairman of the board of directors of FERROCARRIL TRANSANDINO (Total Assets 1.2 BN) and KEY HOLDING CORP; and president of the MACHU PICCHU FOUNDATION. He has also been a shareholder and board member of Banco de Comercio. Mr. Sousa is considered the founder of luxury Hotels and trains concept in Peru; he established in 1995, the first Luxury Hotel in Cusco, Hotel Monasterio, and now owns two of Latam most luxurious Hotels Palacio Nazarenas and Hotel Monasterio. He is also credited for the envisioning and establishing two luxury train sets: The Hiram Bingham Train that runs from Cusco to Machu Picchu and the Andean Explorer Train, that runs from Cusco to Puno and Arequipa; which today is considered the most luxurious sleeper train in the world.

== Conde Nast Traveler – Readers Choice Awards 2019 ==
Lorenzo Sousa received The Readers Choice Awards 2019 – Top Trains.

A total of 600,000 registered voters weighed in for the 32nd annual Readers' Choice Awards, and selected their choices in different categories.

== Entrepreneurship ==
Lorenzo Sousa, in 1990, Mr Sousa was a representative, co founder and shareholder of the Bankers Trust Company Peru. In 1994, he launched the first Country Fund of Peru, Peru Country Fund, and in 2000, he launched the first Real Estate fund listed on the Lima Stock Exchange, and the first Peruvian Mutual Fund; he also participated in the development of the telecommunications company Tele 2000, first celular operator of Peru, in 2013, it has promoted the first technology fair Miami 2013 SIME.

== Books ==
- Co-authored El Capital Ausente, listed by the National Library of Peru among the 65 most important Peruvian books of the last 500 years.
- Authored The Iron Horse of Machu Picchu.
- Authored Mi Viaje por los Emprendimientos 1985–2015.
- Co-authored Banca de Inversión en el Perú with Rafael López Aliaga.
- Mentioned in James B. Sherwood’s book The Orient Express.

== Political activity ==
He has organized and advised in several presidential election campaigns (ad honorem), he has also advised economy ministers in budget and matters structural reforms, he is not affiliated to any particular political party.

== Sources ==
- Book El Capital Ausente by BPR Publishers, 2003
- Book Castas y sistema financiero TETIS GRAF, 2003
- Banca de inversión en el Perú by Piura : Universidad de Piura, 1996
- Book Cómo recuperarlo by BPR Publishers, Jan 1, 2003
- Mi Viaje por los Emprendimientos, June 1985 – 2015, 2016
- Conde Nast Traveler Readers Choice Awards 2019
- Lorenzo Iglesias:
- Iglesias:
