= Empresa Nacional de Ferrocarriles del Perú =

The Empresa Nacional de Ferrocarriles del Perú (Enafer) is a public company which ensures the management and the commercial use of the railway network of Peru.

Created by decree on September 19, 1972, it was formed by the nationalization of several foreign-owned companies which had serviced mostly two separate networks: the Ferrocarril Central Andino serving Lima, and the Ferrocarril del Sur offering a second connection to the Pacific Ocean. It has once again been privatised.

The rail network of Peru includes in total 1,886 km (1,172 mi) of lines, mainly with single track that is 1,435 mm (4 ft 8 1/2 in) standard gauge. On this track is found the highest-altitude railway station in the world, Galera, at 4,781 m (15,686 ft) above sea level. The new Qingzang railway now beats this altitude record.

== See also ==
- Ferrocarril Central Andino
- Railroad Development Corporation
- PeruRail
