= PeruRail =

Peruvian railway company

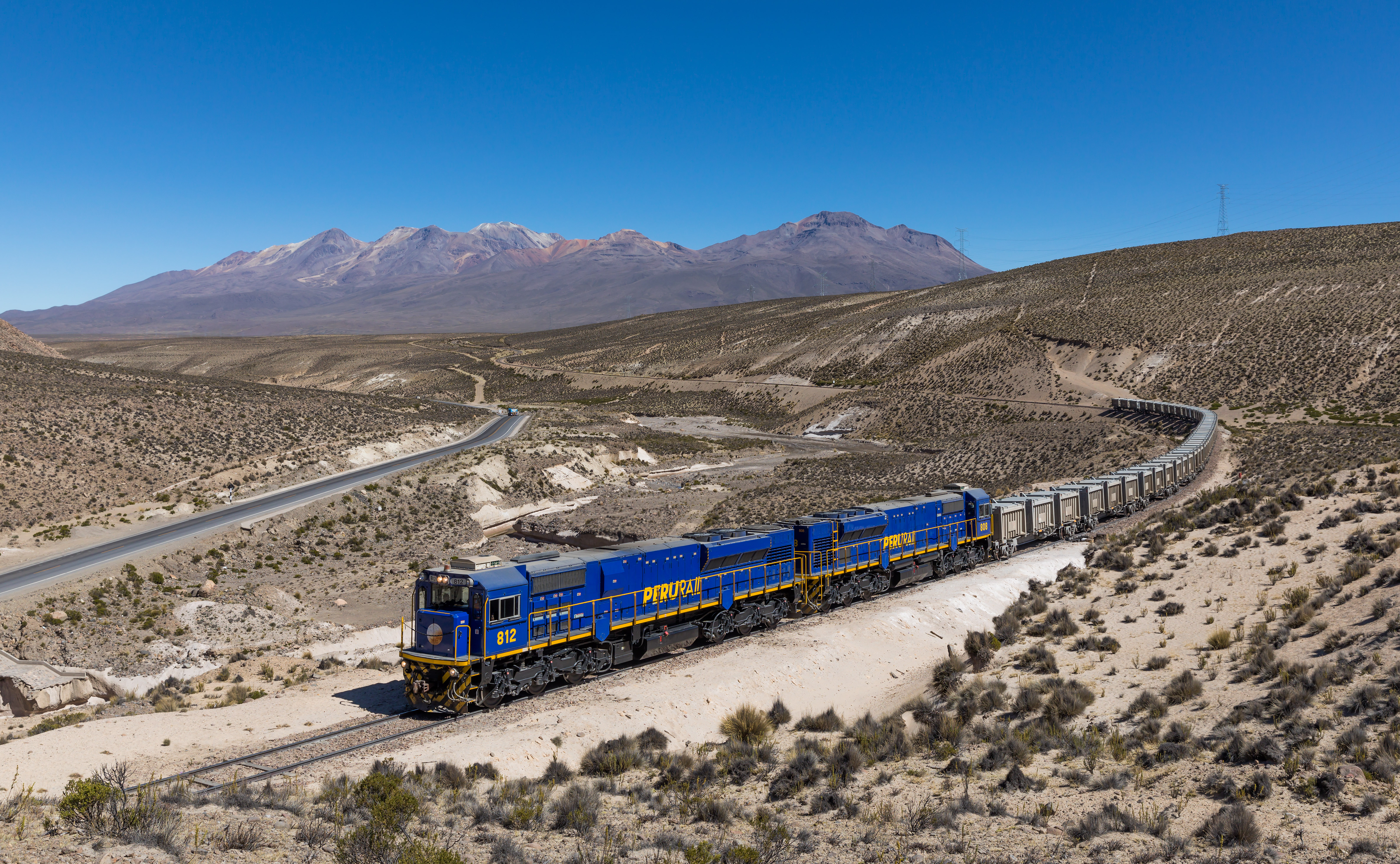
- PeruRail's EMD GT42AC 812 and 808 haul a container train from Matarani towards the Las Bambas mine.

Overview
- Main regions: Arequipa; Cusco; Puno
- Fleet: See rolling stock
- Parent company: Belmond Limited (50%); Peruvian partners (50%)
- Headquarters: Av. Armendáriz 480, Piso 5, Of. 501, Urbanización Armendáriz, Miraflores District, Lima, Peru
- Key people: Lorenzo Sousa Debarbieri
- Founders: Peruvian partners; Sea Containers
- Locale: Southern Peru
- Dates of operation: 1999–present
- Predecessor: Ferrocarril del Sur

Technical
- Track gauge: Eastern and western: 1,435 mm (4 ft 8 1/2 in) standard gauge; Western from Cuzco: 3 ft (914 mm)
- No. of tracks: 1

Other
- Website: www.perurail.com/en/

PeruRail is a railway operator providing tourist, freight, and charter services in southern Peru. It was founded in 1999 by two Peruvian entrepreneurs and the British company Sea Containers.

The main line between the port of Matarani, Arequipa, Cusco and Puno on Lake Titicaca. It was formerly known as the Ferrocarril del Sur (Peru Southern Railway), and was for a time owned and operated by the ENAFER state company. It is the third-highest railway in the world after the Qinghai–Tibet Railway to Tibet and the FCCA line from Lima to Huancayo, and is the longest line in Peru.

From Cusco, PeruRail provides passenger services on the 3 ft (914 mm) Ferrocarril Santa Ana to Aguas Calientes, delivering tourists to Machu Picchu.

It operates in a 50/50 joint venture between Belmond Limited and Peruvian Trains and Railways, owned by two Peruvian entrepreneurs; Lorenzo Sousa Debarbieri is the chairman of the board of directors of the company.

== Routes ==
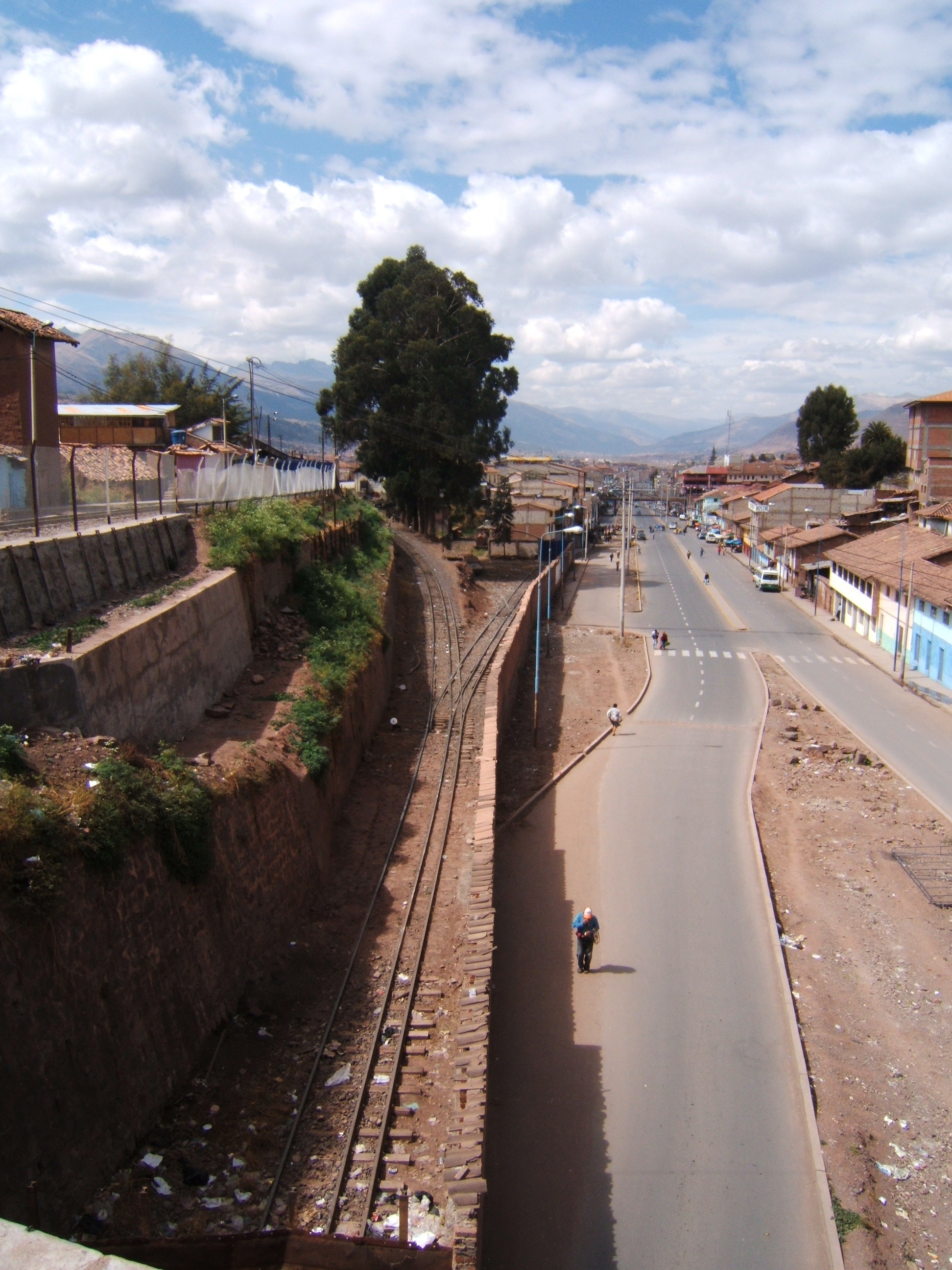
Dual gauge, 1,435 mm (4 ft 8 1/2 in) standard gauge and 914 mm (3 ft) track between two stations in Cuzco, Peru.

Railways in Peru

PeruRail's routes are divided into two sections.

The line between Cusco and Machu Picchu – Ferrocarril Santa Ana is a 3 ft (914 mm) narrow gauge line, which boasts a series of five switchbacks called locally 'El Zig-Zag', which enable the train to climb up the steep incline out of Cusco, before it can begin its descent to the Sacred Valley of the Incas and then continue down to Machu Picchu. However, this section of the route between Cusco San Pedro station and Poroy, which had been suspended, was resumed by Inca Rail from May 2019. Other trains to Machu Picchu leave from Poroy, just outside Cusco, instead.

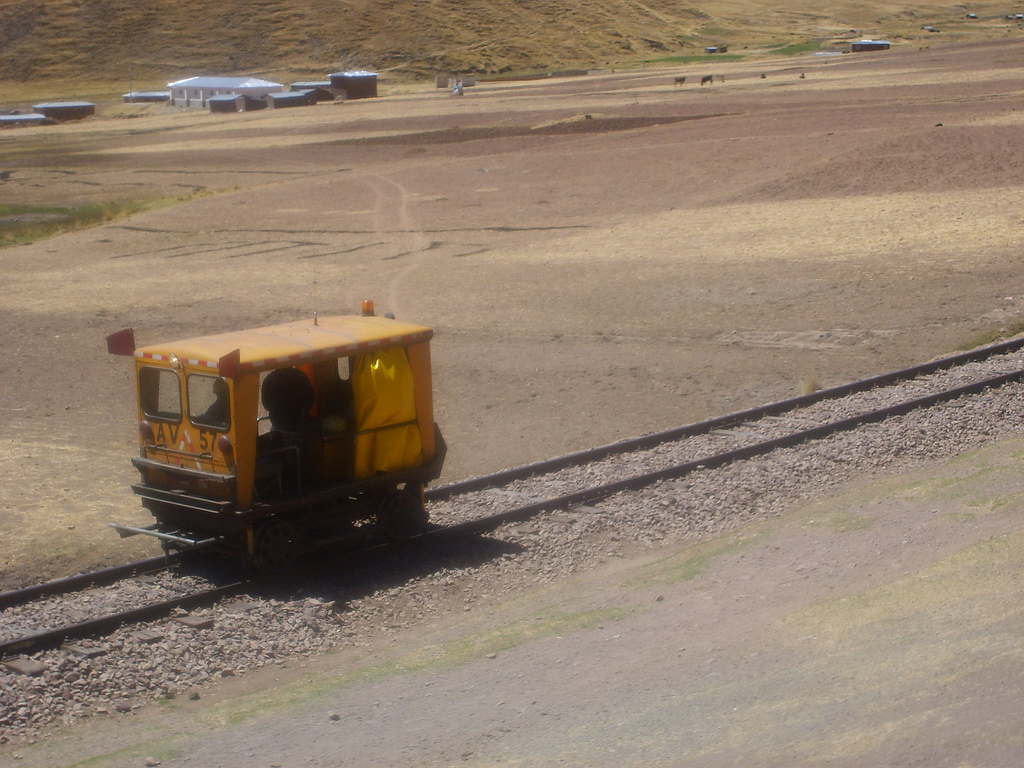
Motor car of Perurail clearing the track ahead of a regular passenger train from Cusco to Puno.

From Poroy, the narrow-gauge line goes northwest to Ollantaytambo, where the branch from Urubamba joins, then on to Machu Picchu station in Aguas Calientes. Tracks formerly continued into the jungle, but they were destroyed by recent flooding.

The 4 ft 8 1/2 in (1,435 mm) standard gauge network, formerly Ferrocarril del Sur, starts at Matarani port, goes through Arequipa and enters Puno Region, where the line splits in two at Juliaca. The eastern branch goes to Puno; the western branch runs into Cusco.

At its highest point, La Raya Pass (14°28′59″S 70°59′20″W), the altitude is 4,313 m (14,150 ft). The train makes a stop in La Raya Pass, where there is a clear view of the surrounding landscape.

Passenger travel no longer operates between Arequipa and Matarani, and it was also suspended on the Juliaca – Arequipa line for several years until May 2017, when the Belmond Andean Explorer service was inaugurated.

There is a dual gauge track connection between the San Pedro railway station (914 mm or 3 ft gauge) and the Huanchac Railway station (1,435 mm or 4 ft 8 1/2 in standard gauge) in Cusco. There is a switch-back to reach San Pedro station. The trains for Aguas Calientes (Machu Picchu) leave from San Pedro station.

=== Route table ===
- Matarani – port
- Cuzco – break of gauge, start of 3 ft (914 mm)
- Juliaca – junction, via Arequipa - second city
- Puno – railhead on Lake Titicaca
- Cuzco – break of gauge, end of 4 ft 8 1/2 in (1,435 mm) standard gauge
- Aguas Calientes – railhead for Machu Picchu
- Urubamba – railhead, partly via the line to Aguas Calientes

== Passenger transport ==
=== Tourist trains ===
==== Cusco–Aguas Calientes (Machu Picchu) ====
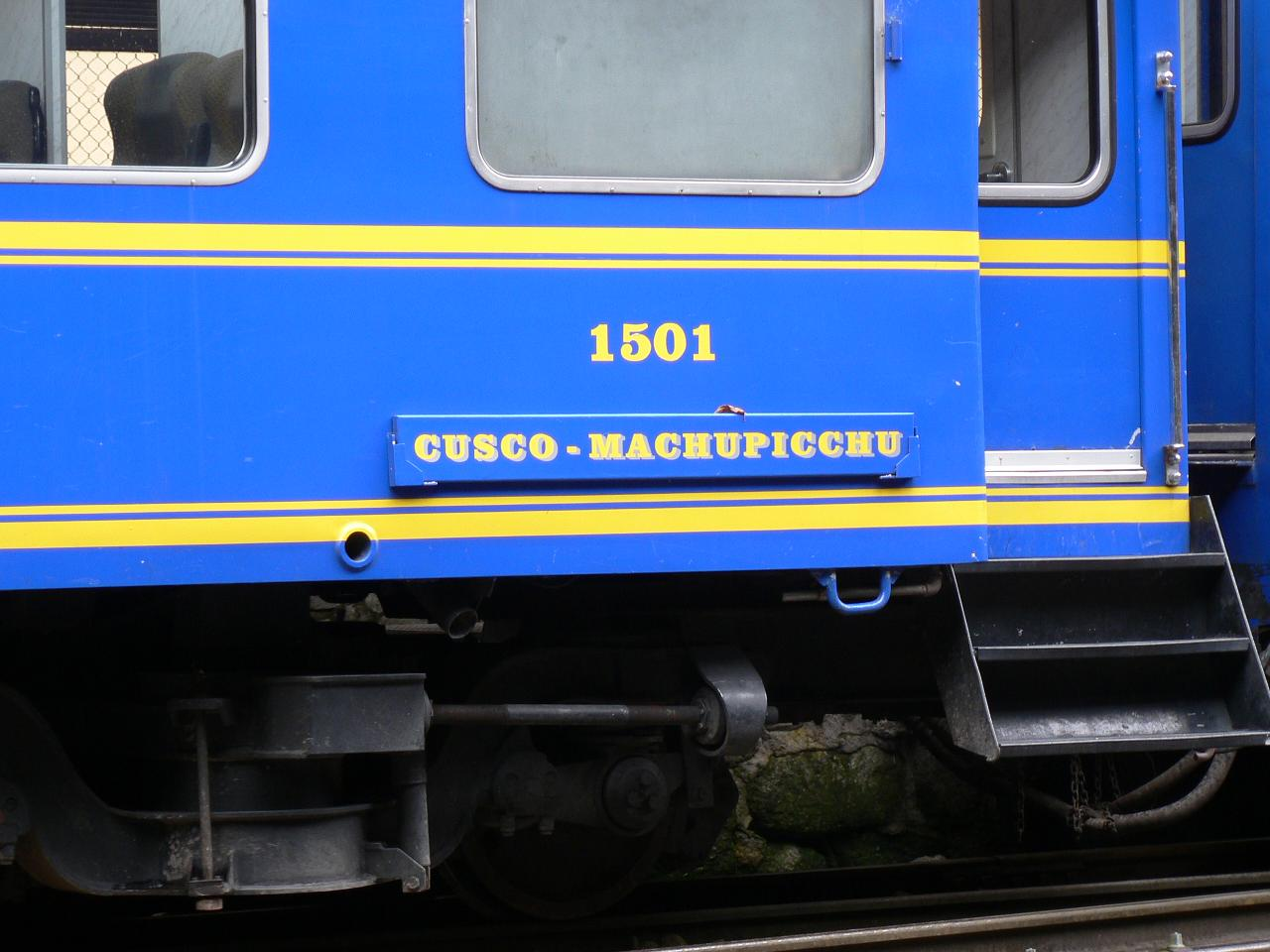
Cusco to Machu Picchu

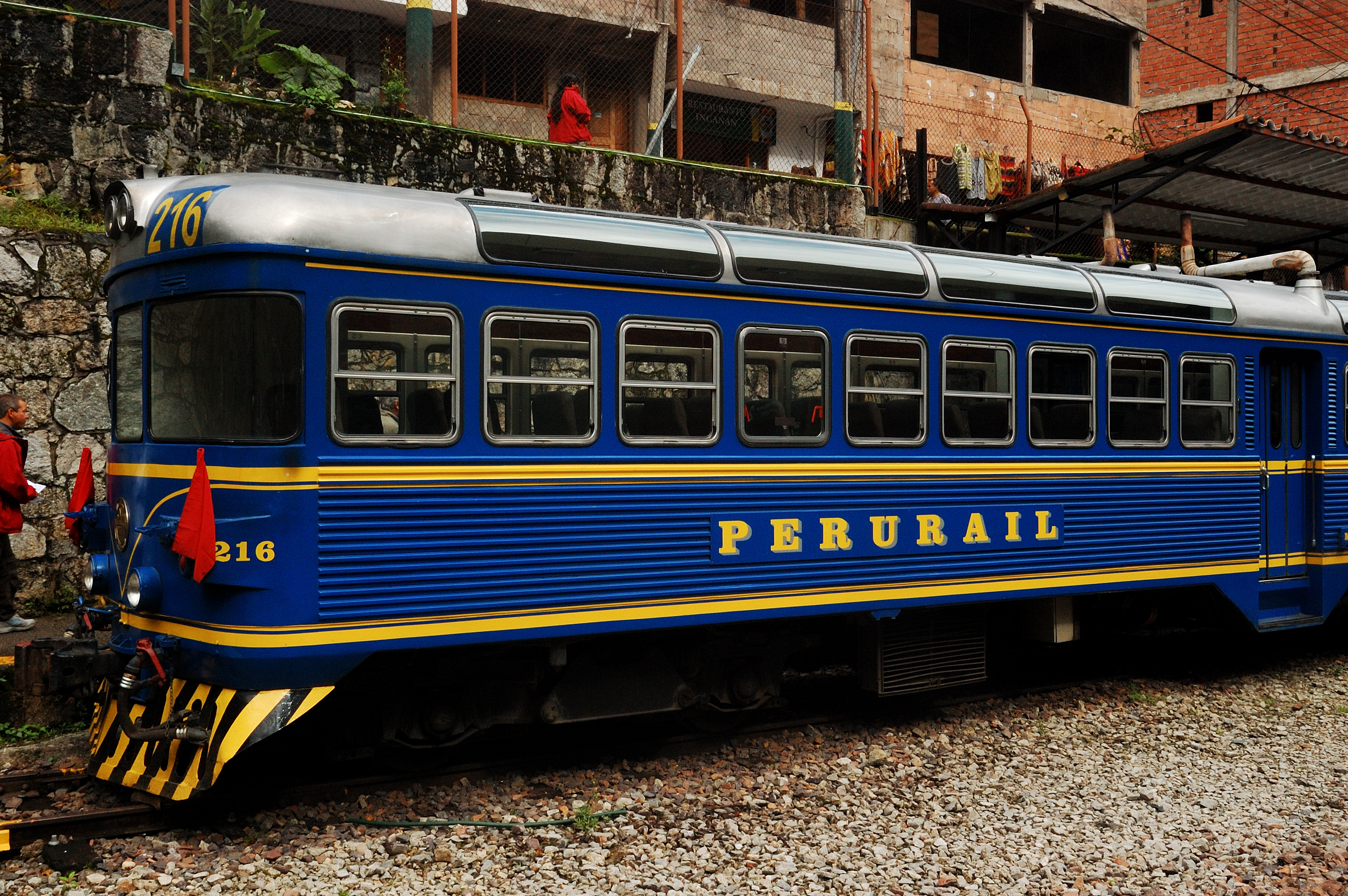
PeruRail observation car

On the route from Cusco to Machu Picchu, PeruRail transports the vast majority of visitors and provides several different services.

The Belmond Hiram Bingham Pullman, named after Machu Picchu's American discoverer, Hiram Bingham, is the most expensive service. It departs from Poroy at 9 a.m., later than other departures. Meals, guides, bus service, and entrance to the ruins are included. PeruRail's own lower category Pullman service with dining and observation/bar car resembling the Titicaca Train (see below) was introduced in 2017 with the name Sacred Valley.

Other services include the observation car, provided by refurbished 1965-vintage German Ferrostaal railcars, with at-seat refreshments and large side and overhead windows allowing views of the mountainous terrain, and Expedition trains, which offer basic service in upholstered seats at a lower price. Snacks are sold, and space is provided for backpacks, particularly for Inca Trail hikers.

==== Puno (Lake Titicaca)–Juliaca–Cusco–Arequipa ====
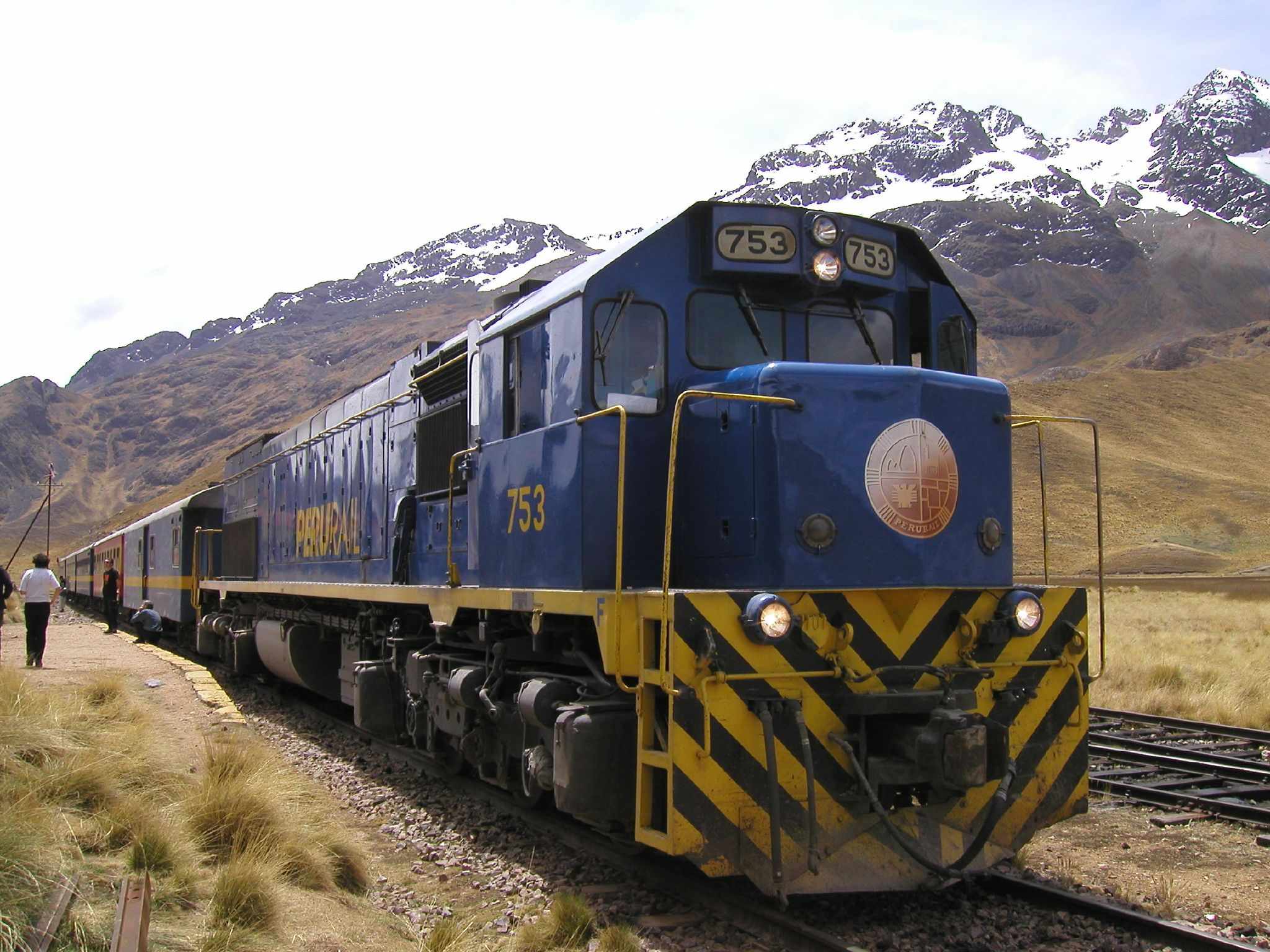
PeruRail train from Cuzco to Lake Titicaca stops at La Raya pass

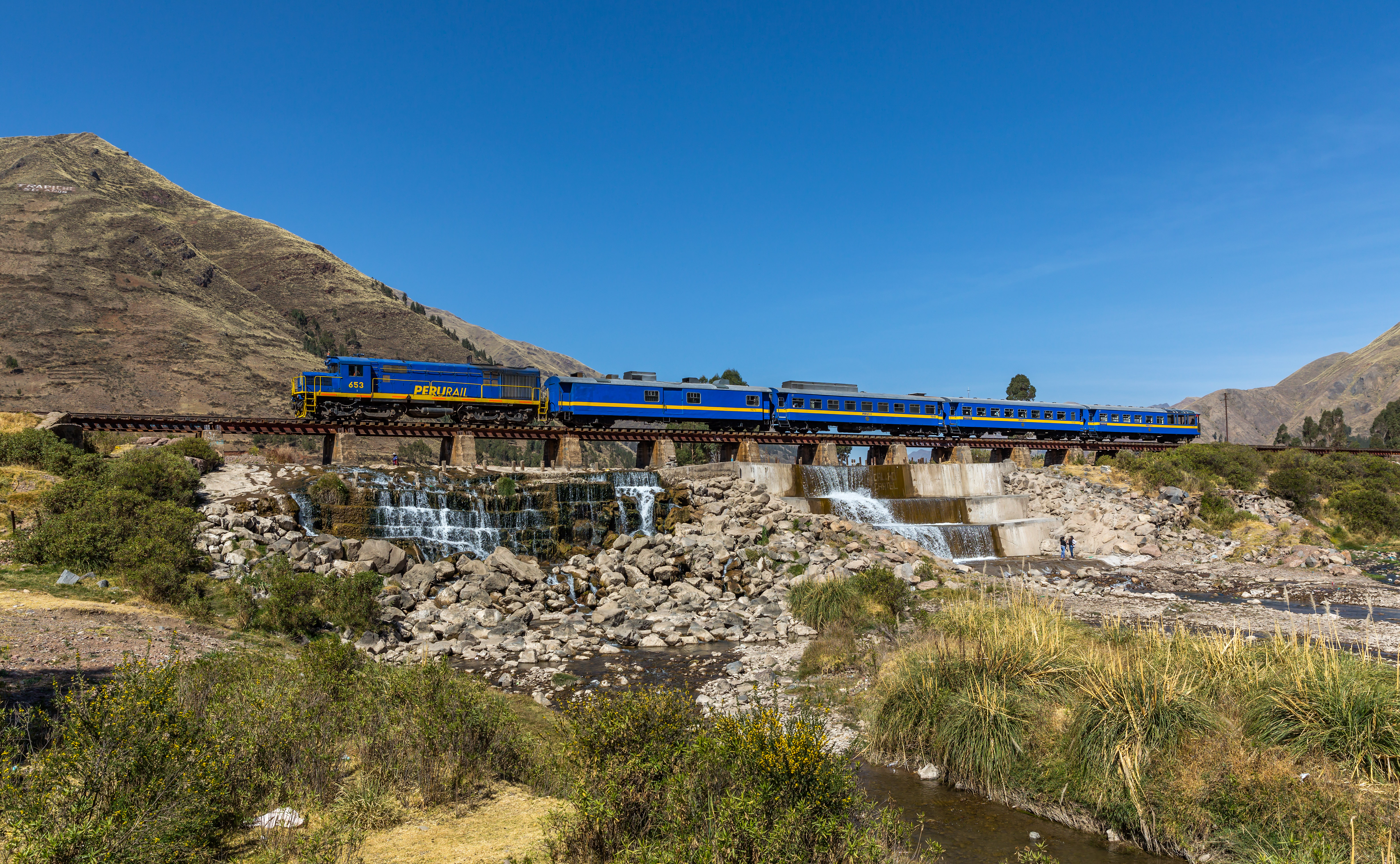
MLW DL560D 653 with a tourist train Puno - Cusco

The luxury sleeper train, Belmond Andean Explorer, is operated from Cusco for a one-night journey to Puno, and a two-night, three-day journey to Arequipa. Its carriages were formerly used on the Great South Pacific Express in Australia between 1999 and 2003, and brought to Peru in February 2016.

Until the inauguration of this service in May 2017, the name was featured on a first-class service day train, which was renamed to Titicaca Train. It has Pullman-style dining cars and an open-air observation bar car similar to Hiram Bingham. This service provides a 10-hour trip from Cusco to Puno. The interiors of its vehicles were designed by James Park & Associates, the same company that designed the elegant first-class cabins for Singapore Airlines. The actual work, however, was done in Cusco by Cusquenian workers. After the refurbishment was completed, a traditional Andean ceremony, 'Pago a la Tierra' (payment to Mother Earth), was organised to 'bless' the train. A local shaman presided over the ceremony, which involved many traditional rites.

=== Local trains ===
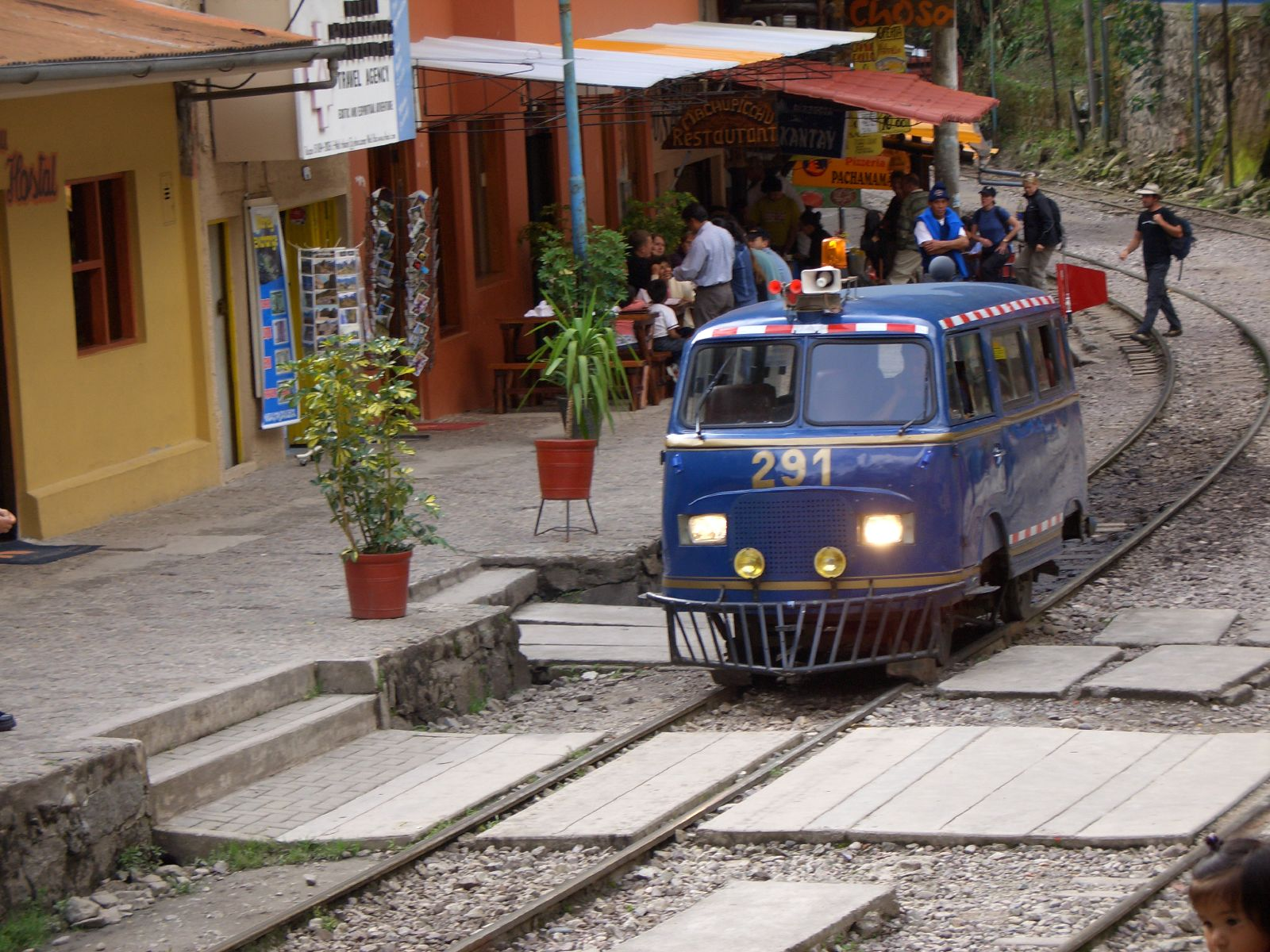
Railbus Officials in Aguas Calientes

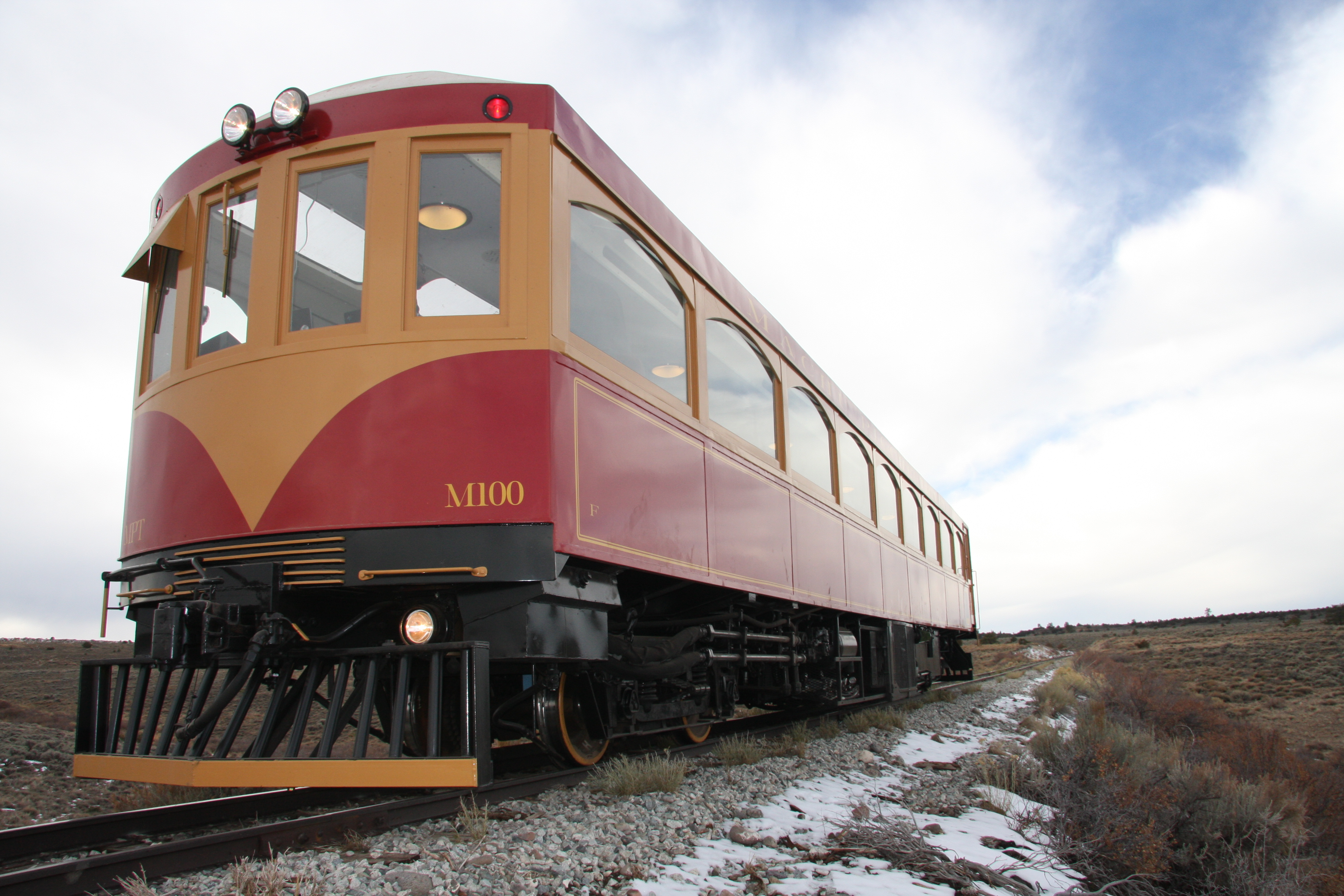
Contemporary Railcar manufactured by EIKON International with final destination to the Cusco - Machu Picchu line

Although not advertised, PeruRail also offers local trains equipped with wooden seats, which are available only to Peruvian nationals for a fraction of the price charged to tourists.

== Freight ==
PeruRail runs daily freight services between the port of Matarani, the city of Arequipa, and the Andean cities of Juliaca, Puno, and Cuzco. Under PeruRail's administration, the tonnage transported increased from 460,000 tons during 1999, 573,000 tons in 2000, to 639,000 tons during 2001.

The main products transported by PeruRail are copper concentrates, fuel, wheat (for Peruvian and Bolivian consumption), coal, cement, soya flour from Bolivia, coffee, beer, and non-alcoholic beverages.

Peru Rail transports copper concentrates for the most important mines in Peru, Las Bambas, Cerro Verde, and other important mining clients.

== Shipping ==
The Lake Titicaca car float Manco Capac operates across Lake Titicaca between PeruRail's railhead at Puno and the port of Guaqui in Bolivia. PeruRail also owns the former ferry SS Ollanta, which was launched on Lake Titicaca in 1931. Ollanta is now refurbished for tourist cruises, and PeruRail has leased her out for charter work.

== See also ==
- List of stock used by PeruRail
- Iperú
- La Raya mountain range
- Rail transport in Peru
- Transport in Peru
- Tourism in Peru

== Bibliography ==
- Whetham, Robert D. (2008). Railways of Peru. Volume 2 – The Central and Southern Lines. Bristol: Trackside Publications. ISBN 978-1-900095-37-2.
- Daniel Thomas (June–July 2002). "Cuzco to Machu Picchu". Latin Tracks. 9: 16–22.
- "Tracks to the Incas". Narrow Gauge World. 98: 34–6. October 2014.
- Lorenzo Sousa. The Iron Horse to Macchu Picchu\volume =1. pp. 9–44.
