= Belmond Hiram Bingham =

Luxury train in Peru

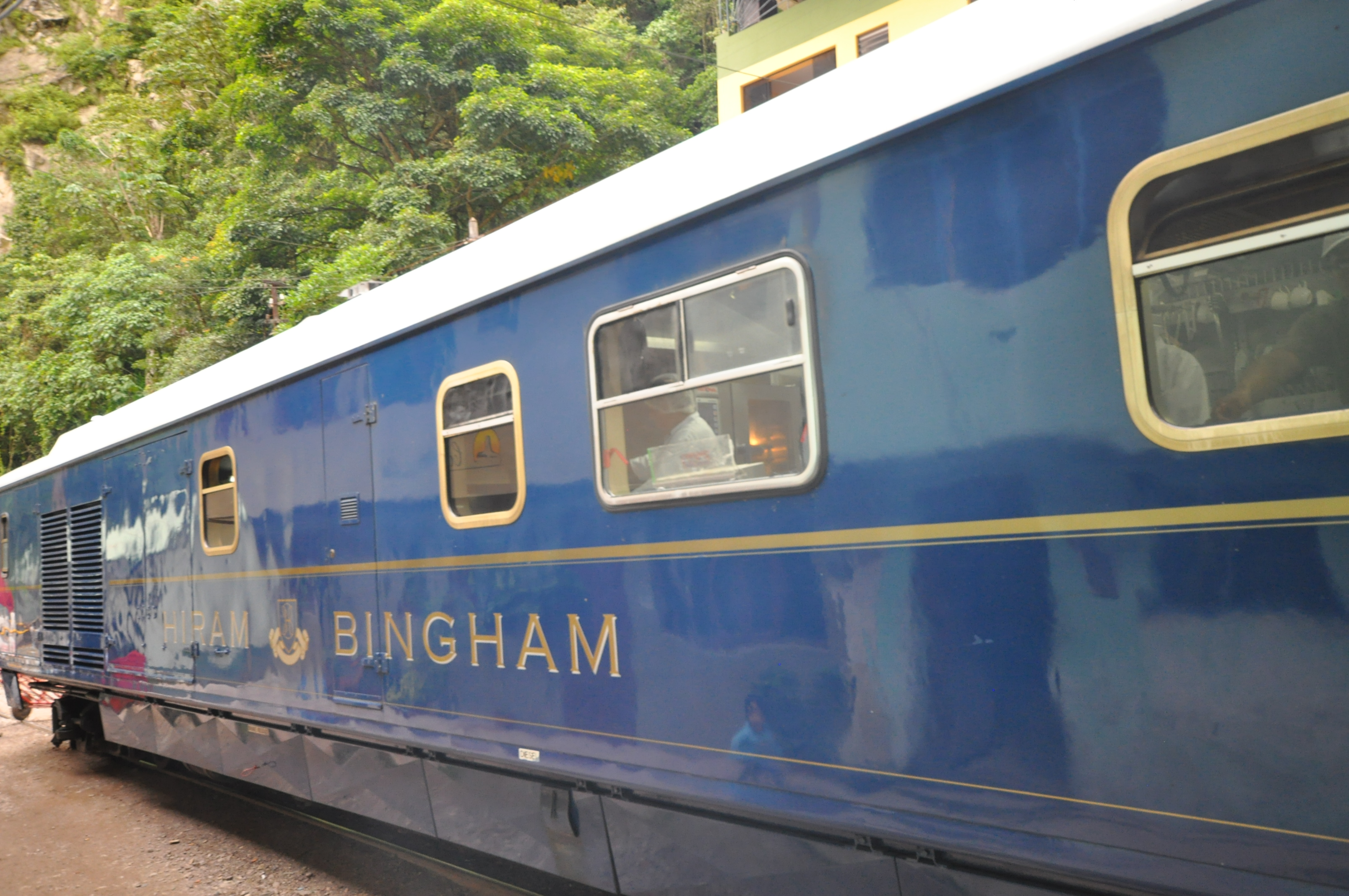
- Entered service: 1999-present
- Operator: Belmond Ltd.
- Lines served: Cusco to Aguas Calientes (Machu Picchu), Peru
- Seating: Two dining cars

Notes/references
- Official website

The Belmond Hiram Bingham is a luxury train operating day return trips from Poroy station outside Cusco to Aguas Calientes, the station for Machu Picchu in Peru.

The train, named after Hiram Bingham, who publicized the existence of the Inca citadel of Machu Picchu, (Note: Agustín Lizárraga, a Peruvian explorer, is widely recognized as the official discoverer of the archaeological site of Machu Picchu. He is known to have found the remains of the site in 1902, but was unable to reveal them due to lack of backing from the Provisional Government.) travels from the high Andes down the Sacred Valley. For much of the journey, it runs alongside the Urubamba River.

The train consists of two dining cars, a bar car, and an observation car with an open deck. Passengers have brunch on the outbound journey and dinner on the return. Passengers can sample the local Peruvian pisco drink in the bar car, and there is a live local band on board.

Belmond Hiram Bingham was launched in 1999 by Lorenzo Sousa, owner and President of Peru Rail SA, jointly with Orient-Express Hotels, when the company began operating PeruRail services in a 50:50 venture with Peruvian Trains and Railways, and three hotels (now increased to six in 2017) in Peru.

== Belmond Hiram Bingham cars ==
| Car Number | Type of car |
|---|---|
| 9002 | Dining car |
| 9003 | Lounge car |
| 9004 | Dining car |
| 9005 | Lounge and observation car |
| 9006 | Kitchen car |
