= Belmond =

Belmond may refer to:

== Places ==
- Belmond, Iowa

== Organisations ==
- Belmond Limited, a hotel and travel company

=== Hotels ===
- Belmond El Encanto
- Belmond Grand Hotel Timeo
- Belmond Hotel Cipriani
- Belmond Hotel Monasterio
- Belmond Hotel Rio Sagrado
- Belmond La Résidence d'Angkor
- Belmond La Résidence Phou Vao
- Belmond Maroma Resort & Spa
- Belmond Villa Sant’Andrea
- Belmond Villa San Michele
- Belmond Splendido Mare
- Belmond Splendido
- Belmond Cap Juluca
- Belmond Hotel Cipriani
- Belmond Hotel Caruso
- Belmond Villa Margherita
- Belmond Mount Nelson Hotel
- Belmond Cadogan Hotel
- Belmond Napasai
- Belmond Hotel das Cataratas
- Belmond Copacabana Palace
