= List of hotels: Countries P-Q =

This is a list of what are intended to be the notable top hotels by country, five or four star hotels, notable skyscraper landmarks or historic hotels which are covered in multiple reliable publications. It should not be a directory of every hotel in every country:

== Palau ==
- Hotel Nikko Palau, Koror
- Palasia Hotel, Koror

== Palestine ==
- Al-Bustan resort, Gaza
- Blue Beach Resort, Gaza
- Al Deira Hotel, Gaza
- Al Mat'haf, Gaza
- Gaza Museum of Archaeology, Gaza
- Jacir Palace, Bethlehem
- Mövenpick Hotel Ramallah, Ramallah
- The Walled Off Hotel, Bethlehem
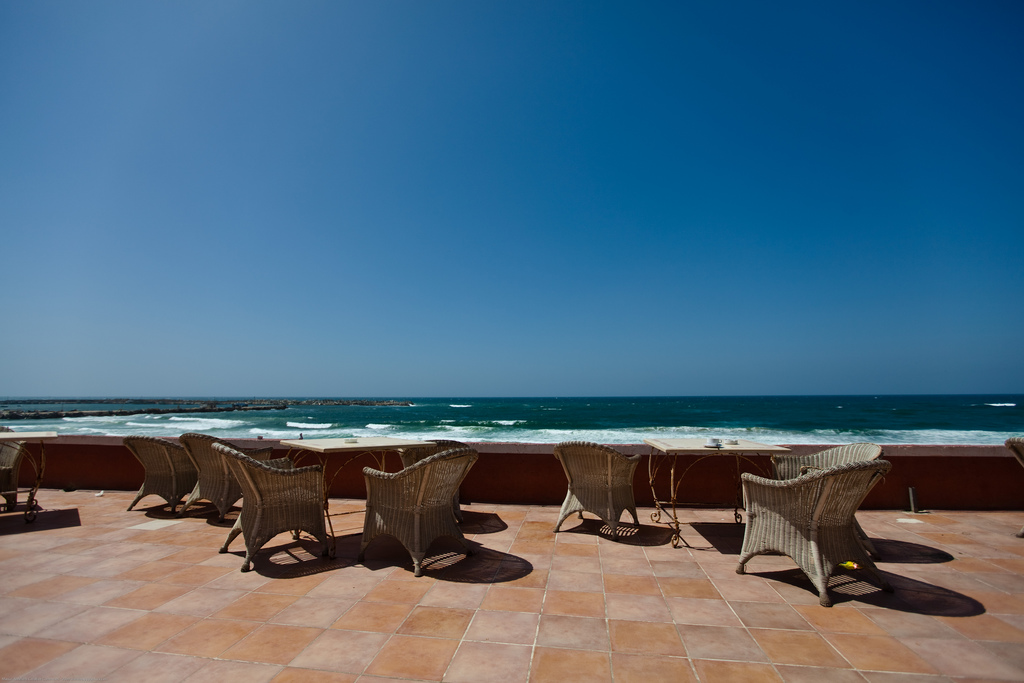
Al Deira Hotel

== Panama ==
- Evolution Tower, Panama City
- HSBC Tower, Panama City
- JW Marriott Panama, Panama City
- Megapolis Tower 1, Panama City
- Tivoli Hotel, Panama City

== Papua New Guinea ==
- Gateway Hotel, Port Moresby
- Lamana Hotel, Port Moresby

== Peru ==
- Belmond Hotel Rio Sagrado, Sacred Valley
- Belmond Miraflores Park, Lima
- Belmond Sanctuary Lodge, Cusco
- Country Club Lima Hotel, Lima
- Delfines Hotel & Convention Center, Lima
- Gran Hotel Bolívar, Lima
- Hotel Crillón, Lima
- Hotel Monasterio, Cusco
- Hotel Paracas, Pisco
- JW Marriott Hotel Lima
- Miraflores Park Hotel, Lima
- Old Hotel Palace, Iquitos
- Sheraton Lima Historic Center, Lima
- The Westin Lima Hotel & Convention Center, Lima

== Portugal ==
- Afonso II Pousada
- Belmond Reid's Palace
- Buçaco Palace
- Cascais Pousada a.k.a. Cascais Citadel Pousada
- Porto Pousada a.k.a. Freixo Palace Pousada
- Grande Hotel da Póvoa
- Lawrence's Hotel
- Óbidos Castle Pousada
- Pestana Palace
- Maria I Pousada
- Ria Pousada
- Santa Cruz Pousada a.k.a. Horta Pousada
- Seteais Palace
- Verride Santa Catarina Palace
- Vidago Palace Hotel

== Qatar ==
- Aspire Tower, Doha
- Katara Towers, Lusail
- Mondrian Doha, Doha
- Qatar Petroleum District, Doha
- Sheraton Doha Resort & Convention Hotel, Doha
