= Belmond Palacio Nazarenas =

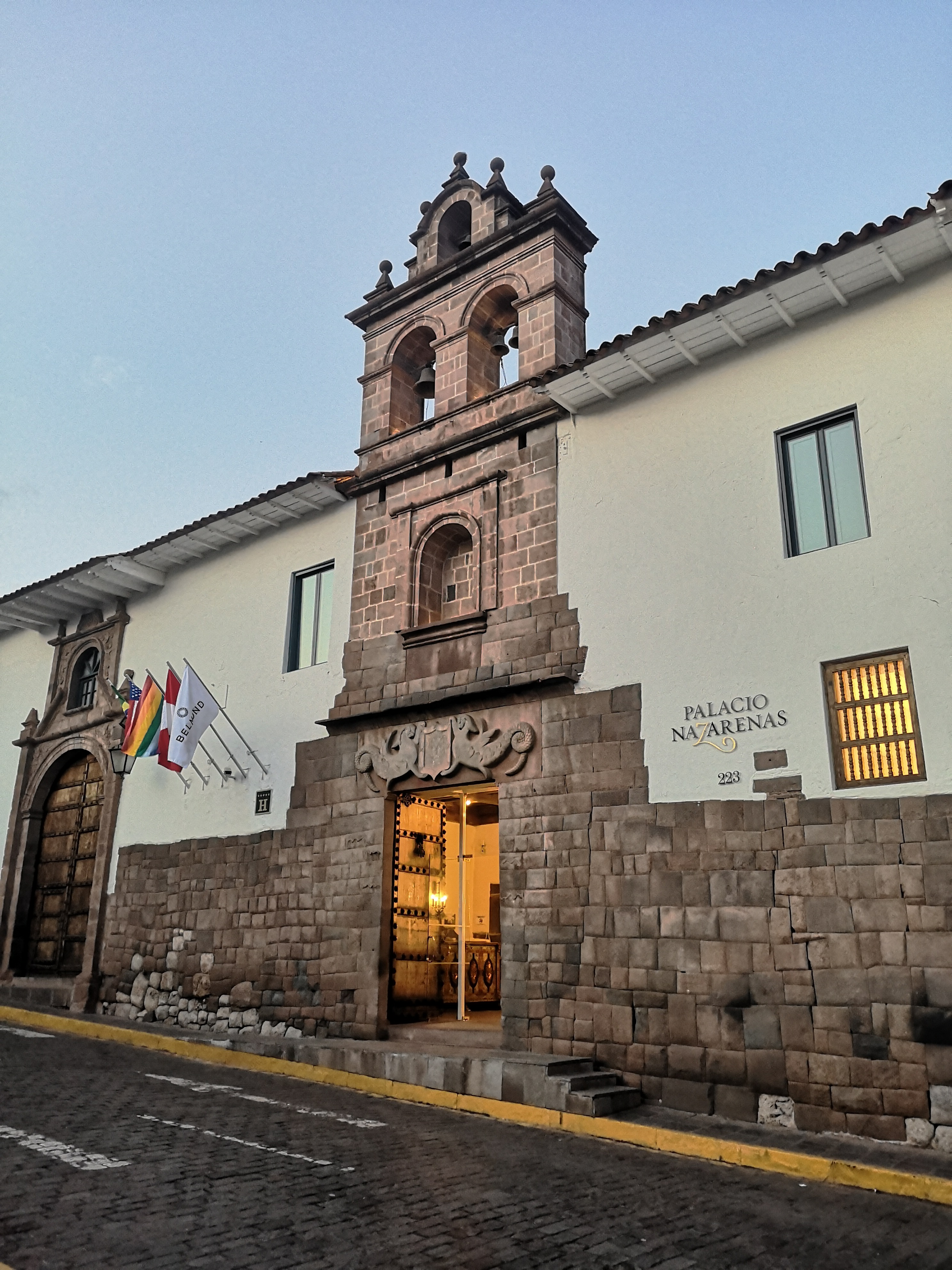
- Interactive map of the Belmond Palacio Nazarenas area

General information
- Location: Plaza Nazarenas 144, Cusco, Peru
- Coordinates: 13.515024°S 71.977178°W
- Management: Belmond Ltd.

Other information
- Number of suites: 55

Website
- belmond.com/palacio nazarenas

Belmond Palacio Nazarenas is a hotel in a former convent built on Inca walls at the centre of Cusco, Peru. It is located in a small square, close by the Plaza de Armas and the city cathedral.

The hotel stands on the site of a former Inca building and reuses stones that may have been used in the original construction. Shortly after the new building's completion as a private home in the mid 1500s it had a succession of owners, including the famous warrior and gambler Mancio Serra de Leguizamón.

In 1644 the Jesuits acquired the property and used it as a school. In 1650 Cusco suffered a devastating earthquake and the building required extensive repairs. It continued as a school until 1673, before being sold to a private owner in 1687.

In 1715, it was turned into "beaterio", a type of convent for what was considered to be a "lower order" of nuns. Its occupants came from families of the native aristocracy, rather than immigrant Spanish clergy. The nuns never received the level of funding enjoyed by the "higher orders", and therefore the building's fabric remained simple at best.

A church was built within the complex, which the public were allowed to visit. On such occasions the nuns sat in screened enclosures that still stand today. Although this church is no longer permanently consecrated, it is still used for religious worship, weddings and secular gatherings. A mezzanine area above the church is now used as a library, with a display of artifacts discovered during recent restoration.

One of the former nuns' cells has a fresco of Christ, known as the Lord of Huanca, which has always been highly venerated by the people of Cusco. It has recently been restored by distinguished art restorer Julio Ninantay.

The nuns ran an orphanage within their complex and also made marzipan delicacies for sale to raise funds. Transactions were conducted via a turntable so that neither seller nor purchaser need see one another. This device can still be seen at the hotel's entrance.

Many early frescoes were painted on the walls of the complex, a number of which remain and have been restored. A fountain sits at the centre of the main courtyard, with Inca-style water channels running from it.

One of the hotel's suites, thought to have once been the Mother Superior's quarters, has a coffered ceiling painted with pink roses. Other rooms contain features such as Inca-style niches and brick arches.

In 1876 a girls' boarding school and a lower school for "young women of scarce resources" were introduced.

In 1961 the Nazarenes dissolved their order into that of the Carmelites and the number of nuns living in the building reduced. By 1977 the last ones had moved out, and the building was leased to the Peruvian government agency Plan Copesco, with the aim of restoring it. Plan Copesco left the building in 1997 and in 1999 the lease was transferred to Orient-Express Hotels. Following a complex restoration project, it opened as Palacio Nazarenas in 2012. The hotel has the first outdoor swimming pool in Cusco, a spa and a restaurant that uses herbs and vegetables grown in the hotel's gardens.

In 2014 the company changed its name to Belmond Ltd. At that time the hotel was renamed Belmond Palacio Nazarenas.

In 2020 The Belmond hotel chain announced the official reopening of two of its hotels: the Belmond Palacio Nazarenas and Belmond Hotel Rio Sagrado.
