= Tivoli Hotel =

Tivoli Hotel may refer to

- Tivoli Hotel, Panama opened 1906, closed 1971
- Tivoli Hotel (Biloxi, Mississippi), opened 1926, demolished 2006
- Tivoli Hotels & Resorts, brand owned by Minor Hotels
