= Belmond Casa de Sierra Nevada =

- Interactive map of the Belmond Casa de Sierra Nevada area

General information
- Location: Hospicio 35, San Miguel de Allende, Guanajuato, Mexico 37700
- Coordinates: 20.91284°N 100.74234°W
- Management: Belmond Ltd.

Other information
- Number of rooms: 37

Belmond Casa de Sierra Nevada is a hotel in the UNESCO World Heritage Site town of San Miguel de Allende in Central Mexico, 167 miles from Mexico City. This historic town was founded on the wealth of silver and was also a centre of revolutionary activity during the struggles for Mexican independence. It was built in 1580.

The hotel consists of six colonial mansions, including a 17th-century fort, the 18th-century Casa Palma and the former residence of San Miguel de Allende’s archbishop in the 16th century. The hotel is located at the town centre among old cobbled streets and parks.

These buildings are set around courtyards with cloisters, fountains and frescoes. The hotel also has its own wellbeing centre—Laja Spa—and cooking school, Sazón.

In 2006 the hotel was acquired for US$8.4 million for a 75 per cent stake by Orient-Express Hotels, which in 2014 changed its name to Belmond Ltd. At that time the hotel was renamed Belmond Casa de Sierra Nevada
