= Saint Anthony the Abbot Seminary =

Seminary in Cuzco, Peru

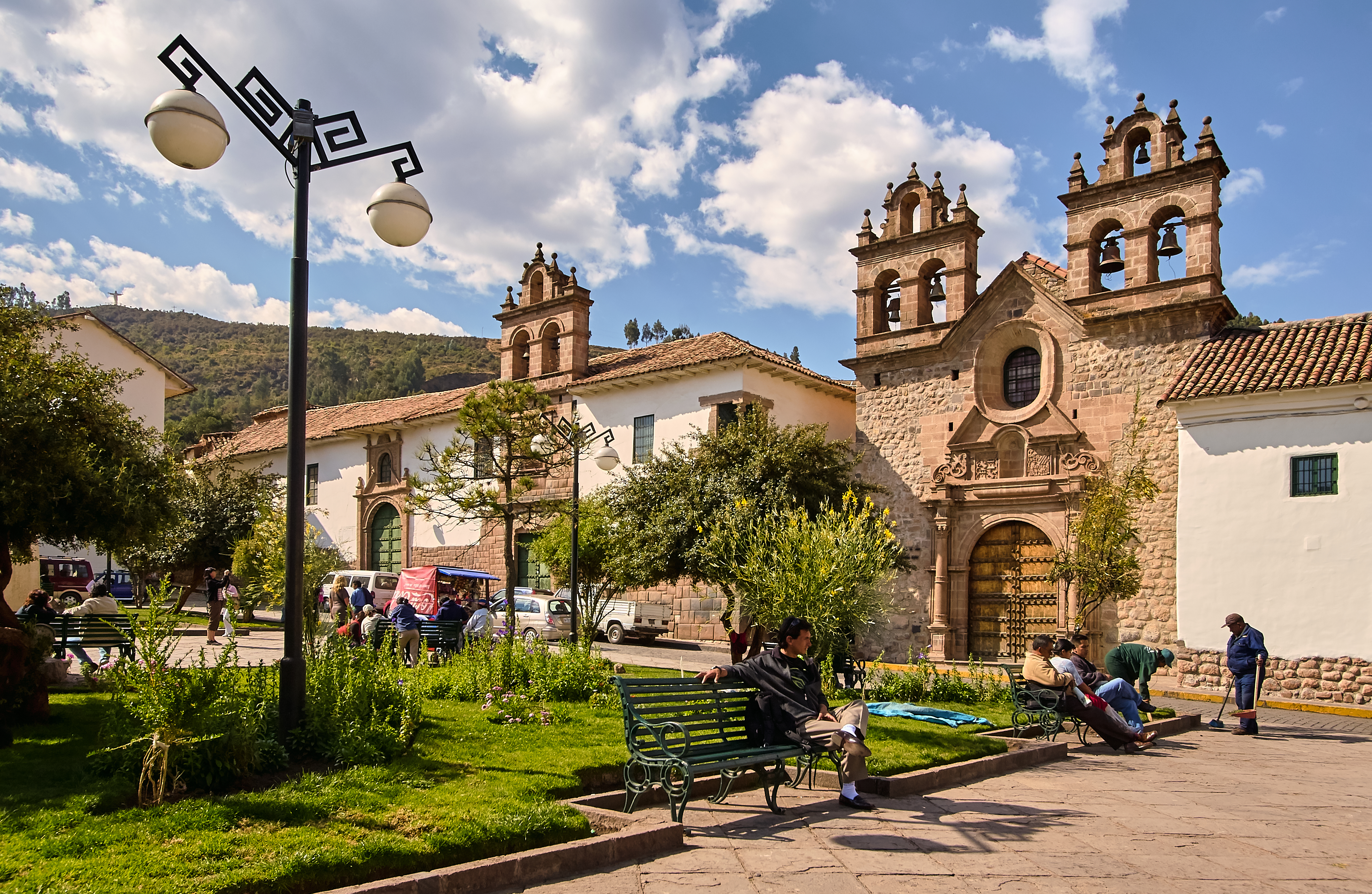
The church and plaza in 2007

Saint Anthony the Abbot Seminary (Spanish: Seminario de San Antonio Abad), also known simply as the Seminary of Cuzco (Spanish: Seminario de Cuzco), is a seminary in charge of preparing priests for the Archdiocese of Cuzco. It is based in Cuzco, Peru, and can be considered among the oldest in the American continent (1598). It is named after Saint Anthony the Abbot.

A Spanish delegation was sent to the Seminary in 1899 to reform the school's administration. Under the second government of Augusto B. Leguía, the seminary was again reformed with the intention to make it more americanized.

== See also ==
- National University of Saint Anthony the Abbot in Cuzco
- Belmond Hotel Monasterio, located on the seminary's former premises
