= Belmond Las Casitas =

Belmond Las Casitas is a hotel in the Colca Valley, Caylloma Province, Arequipa, Peru, 180 km (118 miles) north of Arequipa and 8 km (5 miles) from the town of Chivay, which is known for its regional market. It is a one-hour hike from the colcas or granaries, hewn into the cliffs just above the river, where inhabitants of the valley dating back to the pre-Inca era would store grain. It is 11.2 km (7 miles) from the Colca Canyon where condors can be seen in flight.

The hotel consists of 20 individual 120 m2 casitas (villas) with private plunge pools and a Presidential Casita of 240 m2 with a fireplace and its own pool. The hotel has two restaurants, a spa and gardens which include a small farm with alpacas and a kitchen garden.

The hotel was acquired by Orient-Express Hotels in 2008. In March 2014 the company changed its name to Belmond Ltd. The hotel was renamed Belmond Las Casitas.
