= Belmond La Residencia =

General information
- Location: Son Canals s/n, 017179 Deià, Mallorca, Spain
- Management: Belmond Ltd.

Other information
- Number of rooms: 67

Website
- Official website

Belmond La Residencia is a hotel on the northern coast of Mallorca in the artists’ village of Deià. It sits in the lee of the Tramuntana Mountains and faces the Mediterranean Sea. It consists of two old manor houses and a collection of hillside suites.

During the 18th century much of Deià was owned by an order of Cistercian monks. In 1744 the monks acquired Son Canals, one of the twin manor houses that form the core of the hotel. They then directed a source of water to it, to irrigate the estate that surrounds the property.

The Spanish government of 1820 expropriated the Church’s lands and Son Canals was one of several estates in Deià to be auctioned. It was bought by Mr. Benito Capó Puigserver in 1821. Shortly before his death in 1823 he willed it to his wife and sons. King Fernando VII ascended the Spanish throne later that year and declared the will null and void. Puigserver’s widow pursued ownership through the courts and the property was finally returned to her in 1836. From then onwards the property remained in private hands.

Thanks to the water supply the estate’s orchards and olive groves continued to thrive. The production of olive oil became the principal source of income for the property. But by the mid-20th century the estate was no longer as profitable. Improved communications on the island brought competition from other goods from further afield.

The property was put up for sale and purchased by Axel Ball who decided to turn it into a hotel. It opened in 1984 as the first of its kind on the island. Every bedroom was individually decorated with antiques—quite different from any other Mallorca hotel.

During the 20th century artists from all over the world came to live in Deià, and a community of painters, sculptors and decorative artists grew up. The hotel has always been a focus of this activity and now has its own art collection, a sculpture garden, resident artists and a number of art-related events.

In 1987 Richard Branson partnered with Axel Ball, and in 2002 it was sold to Orient-Express Hotels. The property has expanded in size since it first opened but it still has the character of a country estate.

Today the olive groves are being restored and olive-oil production has resumed. Donkeys and sheep have returned to the hillside and the estate is again producing its own farm products—still on a small scale, but increasing year on year.

In 2014 Orient-Express changed its name to Belmond Ltd. At that time the hotel was renamed Belmond La Residencia
