= Belmond Hotel Caruso =

- Interactive map of the Belmond Hotel Caruso area

General information
- Location: Ravello, Italy
- Coordinates: 40.65141896960146°N 14.612966345655641°E
- Opening: 1893

Website
- https://www.belmond.com/hotels/europe/italy/amalfi-coast/belmond-hotel-caruso/

Belmond Hotel Caruso is a hotel located in the hill town of Ravello, near Amalfi in southern Italy.

It was originally built in the 11th century as a palace by a patrician Roman princely family d’Afflitto who called it the Palazzo D'Afflito - meaning "the afflicted", a reference to both a shipwreck they had when travelling to Constantinople and the afflictions suffered by a family martyr. This palace was largely destroyed, along with much of Ravello and the neighbouring port of Amalfi, by the Republic of Pisa, which was a warring competitor on the Mediterranean routes. The remains lay deserted until the mid-1500s, when a period of reconstruction began. Today much of what remains of the "original" palace dates from works that took place between then and the 17th century, by which time much of its original ornament had been restored.

In 1893, hotelier and vineyard owner Pantaleone Caruso and his wife Emilia Cicalese rented five rooms in one of the wings of the 11th-century palace and opened the "Pensione Belvedere". Its name was given for the views from its hanging gardens over the sea. Caruso covered the open air courtyard behind the entrance, and installed the two 13th-century lions that still sit at the entrance as well as the Roman pillars on the steps leading to the hall.

From the 20th century onwards the hotel had among its guests Virginia Woolf, Greta Garbo, Humphrey Bogart, Jackie Kennedy and Laura Vitale. In recent years, the hotel was managed by the sons of Pantaleone, Paolo and Gino, then in 2005 Orient-Express Hotels Ltd. bought the property. In March 2014 Orient-Express Hotels was renamed Belmond.

== Entrance ==
It is believed that the portal may once have belonged to the church of Saint Eustachio in Pontone, dating from the second half of the 12th century. An official record taken in 1570 noted that it was moved by the D’Afflitto family who owned the church: this was common practice at that time.

The lower half of the portal incorporates the crossbeams of the original, complete with a pair of lions reminiscent of those at the cathedral in Salerno (although here the lion is on the left and the lioness and cub on the right). The lions symbolically guard access to a holy place, and above them are decorative sprays of leaves, animals and birds pecking at bunches of grapes.

The upper part of the portal is composed of the dismantled arch of a pulpit, broken in the middle and reused as brackets. The way in which the two prophets have been configured associates them with the Caserta School, which was active between 1200 and 1220. Two putto heads and other marble decoration were added, further to embellish this portal.

== Frescoes ==
During Caruso’s restructuring of the rooms and some of the public areas, shadows were observed underneath the whitewashed walls of the vaults, which indicated that some colour lay beneath.

Salerno’s Cultural Heritage Office produced records which revealed the existence of frescoes dating back to the 18th century, depicting floral motifs, garlands, birds and butterflies which frame Arcadian landscape scenes. The frescoes were uncovered; and of particular interest is the ceiling in the hall, which has a pair of griffins facing each other, almost as if guarding four frescoes depicting Ravello. These are probably the earliest paintings of the town – pre-dating anything carried out by foreign painters in the mid 19th century.

Recent restoration work was carried out by Professor Antonio Forcellino, of the Central Institute of Restoration in Rome, who previously worked as chief restorer of the Michelangelo Moses on the tomb of Pope Julius II.

== Archaeology ==
Excavation work carried out on the site adjacent to the Hotel Caruso has brought to light the foundations of some medieval walls from houses or a palace within the perimeter of the defensive walls that once surrounded the acropolis of Ravello, which was where the noble families built their palaces. The visible foundations could have once been a wing of the original Palazzo D'Afflitto gone to ruin and never regenerated.

During the excavation, done under the watchful auspices of the Archaeological Department of Salerno, several fragments of artefacts were found which are now at the workshops of the Villa Romana in Minori for dating and classification. They will be returned to the hotel, at which point a special display in glass showcases will be created.

Also during excavation, a room came to light which is believed to have been a bathroom of Arabic influence. It was three metres square, four metres high and had a dome-shaped vault divided into eight bays, each of which contains a fresco. Only four are truly visible and represent two palm trees and two rampant hounds. A long-legged water bird is to be seen clearly between two pillars.

== Vaults ==
Hotel Caruso was built with four different types of vault: barrel, cross, sail and pavilion. The larger rooms with sail vaults are also frescoed with typical 18th-century motifs. The vaults were built either in stone or using a local technique known as ‘beaten lapillus’: dry branches were laid on top of the walls in the desired shape of the vault, and then covered with wet soil. On this base, a paste of lapillus (tiny stones) was applied and beaten down until a compact shape was created. Then the branches were removed, and the ceiling plastered, ready either for frescoing or whitewashing.

== Cappellina ==
Most aristocratic palaces of the 16th century had a small private chapel in which the family could say daily prayers (they went to church on Sundays). The chapel of Belmond Hotel Caruso has a stone altar in baroque style, painted with a marbled tempera and decorated with a stucco relief. Both sides of the chapel above the altar have stucco relief carvings, with images of saints in prayer.
