= Les Bateaux Belmond =

French canal barge hotels

Les Bateaux Belmond is a group of seven canal barges or péniche-hôtels that are part of the Belmond collection of around 50 international hotels, trains and river cruises. Formally known as Afloat in France, the barges offer cruises on canals and rivers in the French regions of Burgundy, Franche-Comté, Saône, Provence, Vallée du Rhône, Midi-Pyrénées and Camargue, while the Alsace and Champagne regions are added in 2018. The barges carry up to 12 passengers. The barges visit towns and cities including Dijon, Besançon, Carcassonne, Arles, Nancy and Strasbourg. There are stops at countryside sites of interest en route.

== History ==
In 2004 five barges were acquired by Orient-Express Hotels, which in 2014 changed its name to Belmond Ltd. At this point the barges were renamed. They are regularly referred to with 'Belmond' in front of the actual registered name. In 2017 Pivoine (Peony) was added to the fleet, to start operating in 2018, along with another newly built barge, Lilas (Lilac).

== Hotel barges ==
=== Fleur de Lys ===
Constructed as a freight vessel at Oostkamp in Belgium in 1941, Fleur de Lys once plied the waterways of Europe with a varied cargo. During World War II, she was commandeered by the German army and ordered to the island of Corsica. She underwent conversion into a passenger vessel, employing Belgian steelworkers and British joiners. She was initially registered as a British ship, but has sailed under the French flag since 1996. At 160 metric tons, she is the largest size of barge capable of navigating the network of older canals in France.

=== Amaryllis ===
Amaryllis was designed in conjunction with La Fluviale, a boat company in Saint-Jean-de-Losne. She is a 40m barge built in 1962. She was converted for passengers in 2001 and made her first cruise in spring 2002.

=== Coquelicot ===
Coquelicot, originally named Vios, then Hirondelle, was built in 1928 in the Netherlands as a 27m cargo barge with a 5.5m beam. She was later lengthened to 38.50m in order to increase her tonnage and her cargo capacity. This meant that she became the largest size of barge able to fit into canal locks. She was brought to France and was converted by Belmond to carry passengers in 1992.

=== Alouette ===
Alouette was built in 1908 at Ouderkeek in the Netherlands. She began her working life as a cargo barge named ‘Cura’ and was later renamed ‘Mars’. In 1986–1987, she was converted and refurbished as a passenger-carrying barge. She was the first of the Belmond Afloat in France fleet.

=== Napoléon ===
Napoléon was converted from the hull of a commercial freight-carrying barge built in Belgium in 1963. She was one of the last commercial barges to have been built. The hull was purchased in Belgium and converted in a small shipyard in Bruges. The woodwork was carried out by British ships’ carpenters in Belgium. Napoléon was launched in May 1991 as a passenger vessel.

=== Pivoine ===
One of two current additions to the fleet, Pivoine will start operating in 2018 in the Champagne region of France, cruising on the river Marne.

=== Lilas ===
The other new barge Lilas will operate from the 2018 season in north-east France, between the Vosges and the Rhine valley, via the Canal de la Marne au Rhin, Strasbourg and the Canal du Rhône au Rhin.
