= Belmond Savute Elephant Lodge =

Lodge in Chobe National Park, Botswana

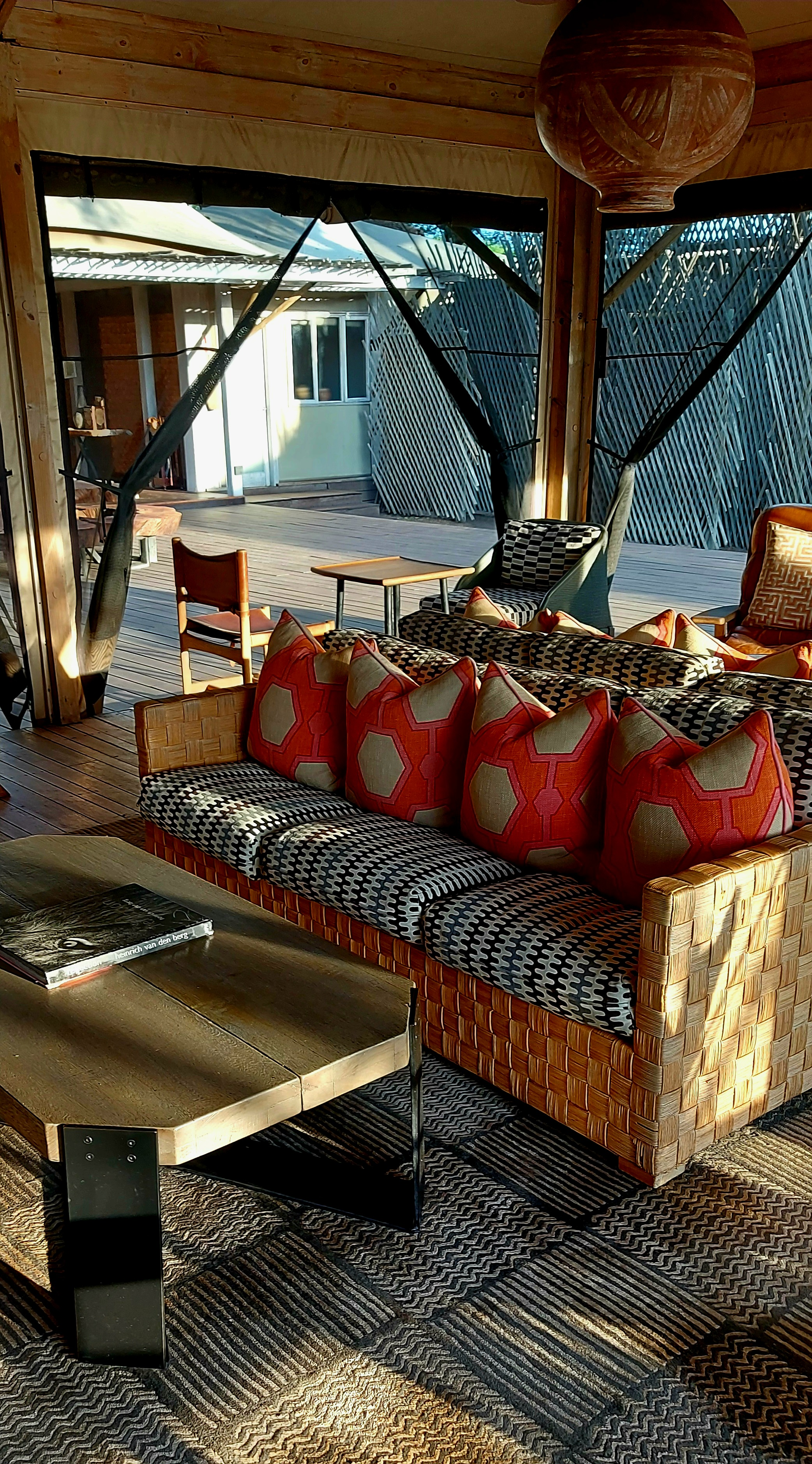
- Interiors using local designs

General information
- Location: Belmond Safaris, Chobe National Park, Botswana
- Operator: Belmond Ltd.

Other information
- Number of suites: 12 luxury tents

Website
- belmond.com/savuteelephantlodge

Savute Elephant Lodge, A Belmond Safari is a safari lodge in Chobe National Park in Botswana. Chobe was the country’s first national park and is its third largest.

The lodge is one of two that comprise Belmond Safaris, the other being Belmond Eagle Island Lodge. Both are reached from Maun, Botswana.

The lodge consists of tented accommodation with traditional African thatched roofs, on raised wooden stilts.

The river was dry for many years, but resumed flowing a few years ago. The park attracts a profusion of elephants, sometimes up to 5000 at one time, as well as reptiles, other big game and birds.

Both lodges that form Belmond Safaris were acquired by Orient-Express Hotels in 1992 under their original name of Gametrackers. In 2014 the company changed its name to Belmond Ltd. and the lodge was renamed Savute Elephant Lodge, A Belmond Safari
