= La Résidence d'Angkor =

La Résidence d’Angkor

General information
- Location: River Road, Siem Reap, Cambodia
- Coordinates: 13.357654819550438°N 103.85928851634536°E
- Operator: Belmond Ltd.

Other information
- Number of rooms: 62

La Résidence d’Angkor is a resort at the centre of Siem Reap in Cambodia. It is a short drive from the temples of Angkor Wat. It has large gardens containing a swimming pool and spa.
