= Orient Express =

Luxury passenger train service in Europe

The Orient Express

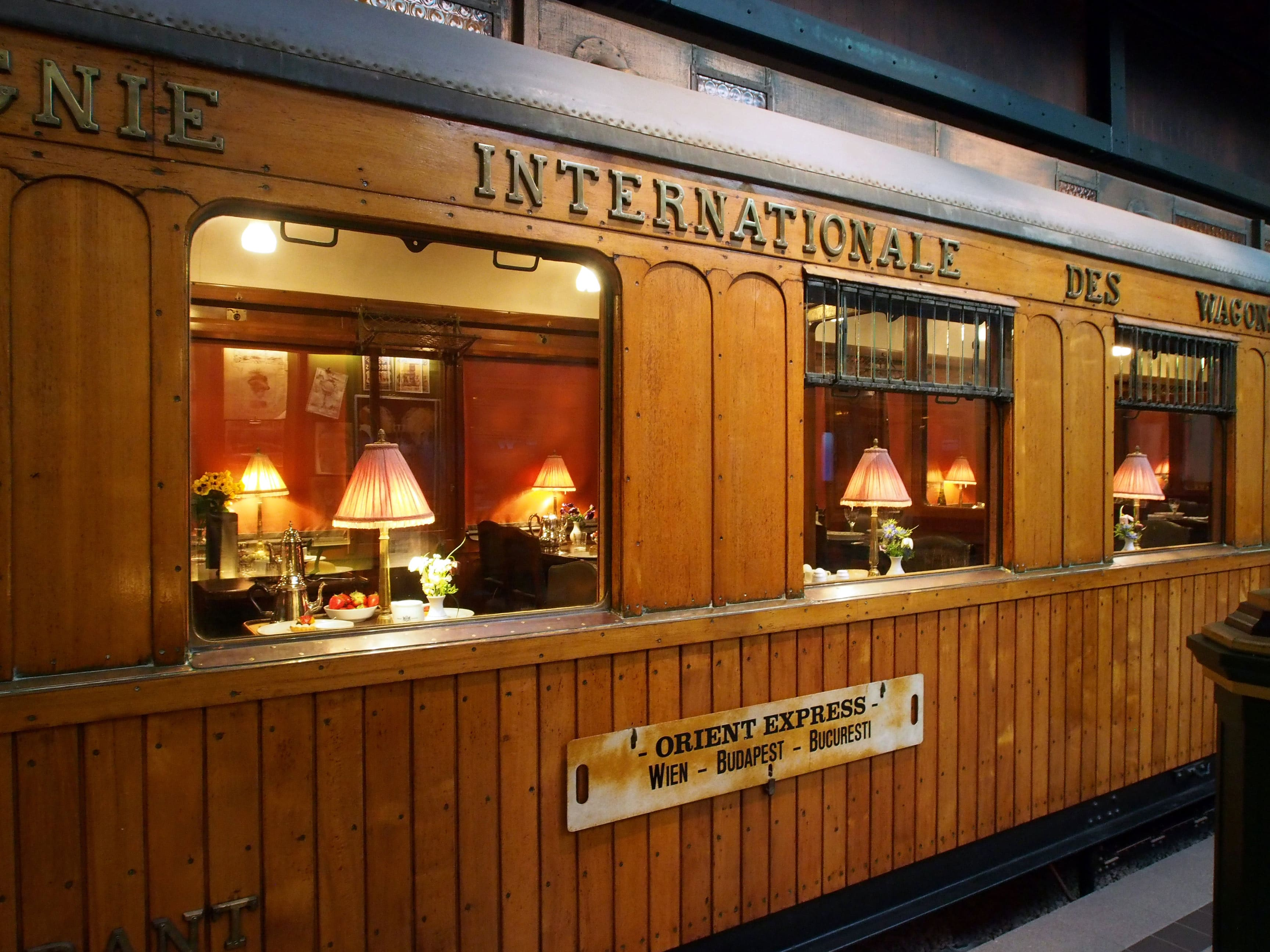
- Orient Express dining car from 1911

Overview
- Service type: Luxury passenger rail
- Status: Defunct
- First service: 4 June 1883; 143 years ago
- Last service: 14 December 2009; 16 years ago
- Former operator: Compagnie Internationale des Wagons-Lits

Route
- Average journey time: 2 days, 20 hours (Paris–Istanbul)

The Orient Express was a long-distance passenger luxury train service created in 1883 by the Belgian company Compagnie Internationale des Wagons-Lits (CIWL) that operated until 2009. The train traveled the length of continental Europe, with terminal stations in Paris in the northwest and Istanbul in the southeast, and branches extending service to Athens, Brussels, and London.

The Orient Express embarked on its initial journey on 5 June 1883, from Paris to Vienna, eventually extending to Istanbul, thus connecting the western and eastern extremities of Europe. The route saw alterations and expansions, including the introduction of the Simplon Orient Express following the opening of the Simplon Tunnel in 1919, enhancing the service's allure and importance. Several routes concurrently used the Orient Express name, or variations. Although the original Orient Express was simply a normal international railway service, the name became synonymous with intrigue and luxury rail travel. The city names most prominently served and associated with the Orient Express are Paris and Istanbul, the original termini of the timetabled service. The rolling stock of the Orient Express changed many times.

Following World War II, the Orient Express struggled to maintain its preeminence amid changing geopolitical landscapes and the rise of air travel. The route stopped serving Istanbul in 1977, cut back to a through overnight service from Paris to Bucharest, which was cut back further in 1991 to Budapest, then in 2001 to Vienna, before departing for the last time from Paris on 8 June 2007. After this, the route, still called the Orient Express, was shortened to start from Strasbourg, leaving daily after the arrival of a TGV from Paris. On 14 December 2009, the Orient Express ceased to operate entirely and the route disappeared from European railway timetables, a "victim of high-speed trains and cut-rate airlines."

In contemporary times, the legacy of the Orient Express has been revived through private ventures such as the Venice Simplon-Orient-Express, initiated by James Sherwood in 1982, which offers nostalgic journeys through Europe in restored 1920s and 1930s CIWL carriages, including the original route from Paris to Istanbul. An ÖBB Nightjet service was restored between Paris and Vienna in December 2021, although this was not branded as Orient Express, and it was cancelled again in December 2025 when the French Government withdrew financial support. In late 2022, Accor announced plans to launch its own Orient Express in late 2026 with journeys from Paris to Istanbul.

== Train Eclair de lux (the "test" train) ==
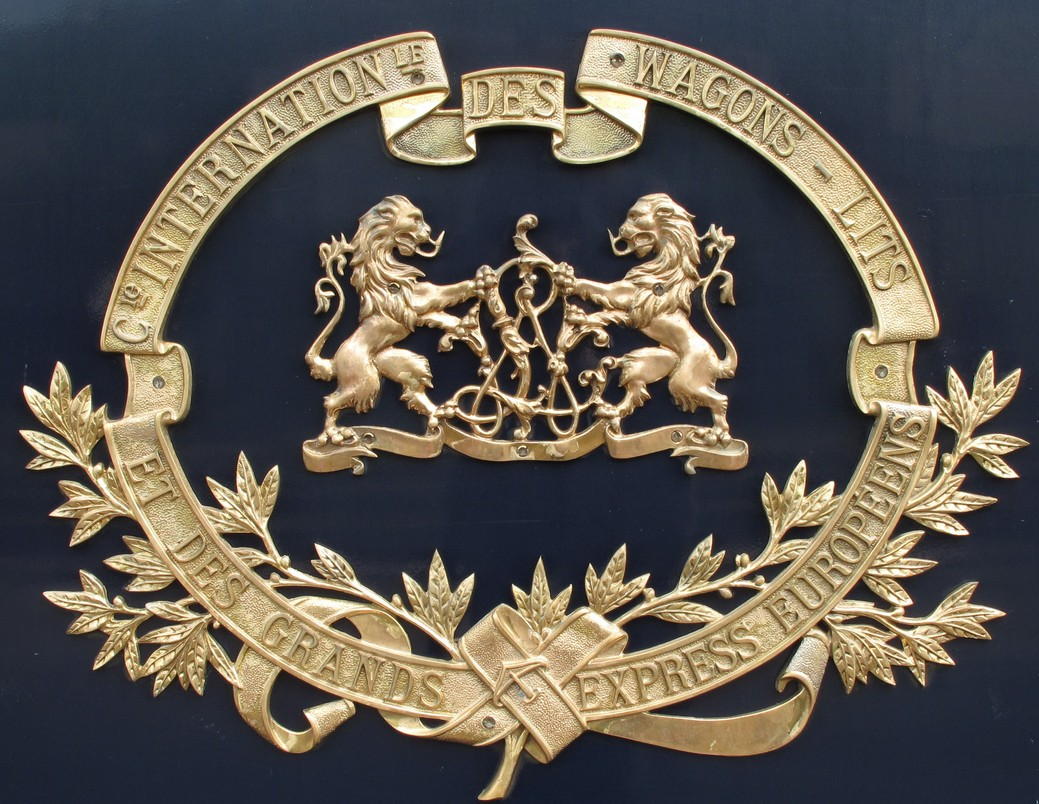
CIWL logo

In 1882, Georges Nagelmackers, a Belgian banker's son, invited guests to a railway trip of 2,000 km (1,243 mi) on his Train Eclair de luxe ("lightning luxury train"). The train left Paris Gare de l'Est on Tuesday, 10 October 1882, just after 18:30 and arrived in Vienna the next day at 23:20. The return trip left Vienna on Friday, 13 October at 16:40 and, as planned, re-entered the Gare de Strasbourg at 20:00 on Saturday 14 October.

Georges Nagelmackers was the founder of Compagnie Internationale des Wagons-Lits (CIWL), which expanded its luxury trains, travel agencies and hotels all over Europe, Asia, and North Africa. Its most famous train remains the Orient Express.

The train was composed of:

- Baggage car
- Sleeping coach with 16 beds (with bogies)
- Sleeping coach with 14 beds (3 axles)
- Restaurant coach (nr. 107)
- Sleeping coach with 13 beds (3 axles)
- Sleeping coach with 13 beds (3 axles)
- Baggage car (complete 101 ton)

The first menu on board (10 October 1882): oysters, soup with Italian pasta, turbot with green sauce, chicken ‘à la chasseur’, fillet of beef with ‘château’ potatoes, ‘chaud-froid’ of game animals, lettuce, chocolate pudding, buffet of desserts.

Orient Express cars, 1930

== Routes ==
Historic routes of the Orient Express – the cross denotes the Simplon tunnel

== History ==
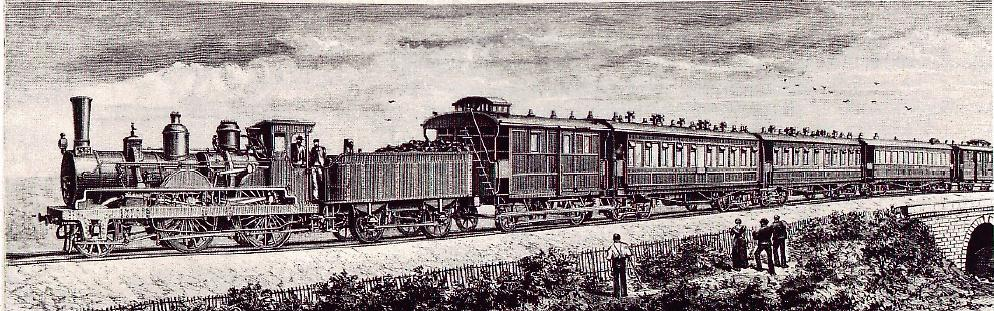
The first Orient Express in 1883

On 5 June 1883, the first Express d'Orient left Paris for Vienna via Munich. Vienna remained the terminus until 4 October 1883, when the route was extended to Giurgiu, Romania. At Giurgiu, passengers were ferried across the Danube to Ruse, Bulgaria, to pick up another train to Varna. They then completed their journey to Constantinople, as the city was still commonly called in the west at the time, by ferry. In 1885, another route began operations, this time reaching Constantinople via rail from Vienna to Belgrade and Niš, carriage to Plovdiv, and rail again to Istanbul.

On 1 June 1889, the first direct train to Constantinople left Paris from Gare de l'Est. Istanbul, as it became known in English by the 1930s, remained its easternmost stop until 19 May 1977. The eastern terminus was the Sirkeci Terminal by the Golden Horn. Ferry service from piers next to the terminal would take passengers across the Bosphorus to Haydarpaşa Terminal, the terminus of the Asian lines of the Ottoman Railways.

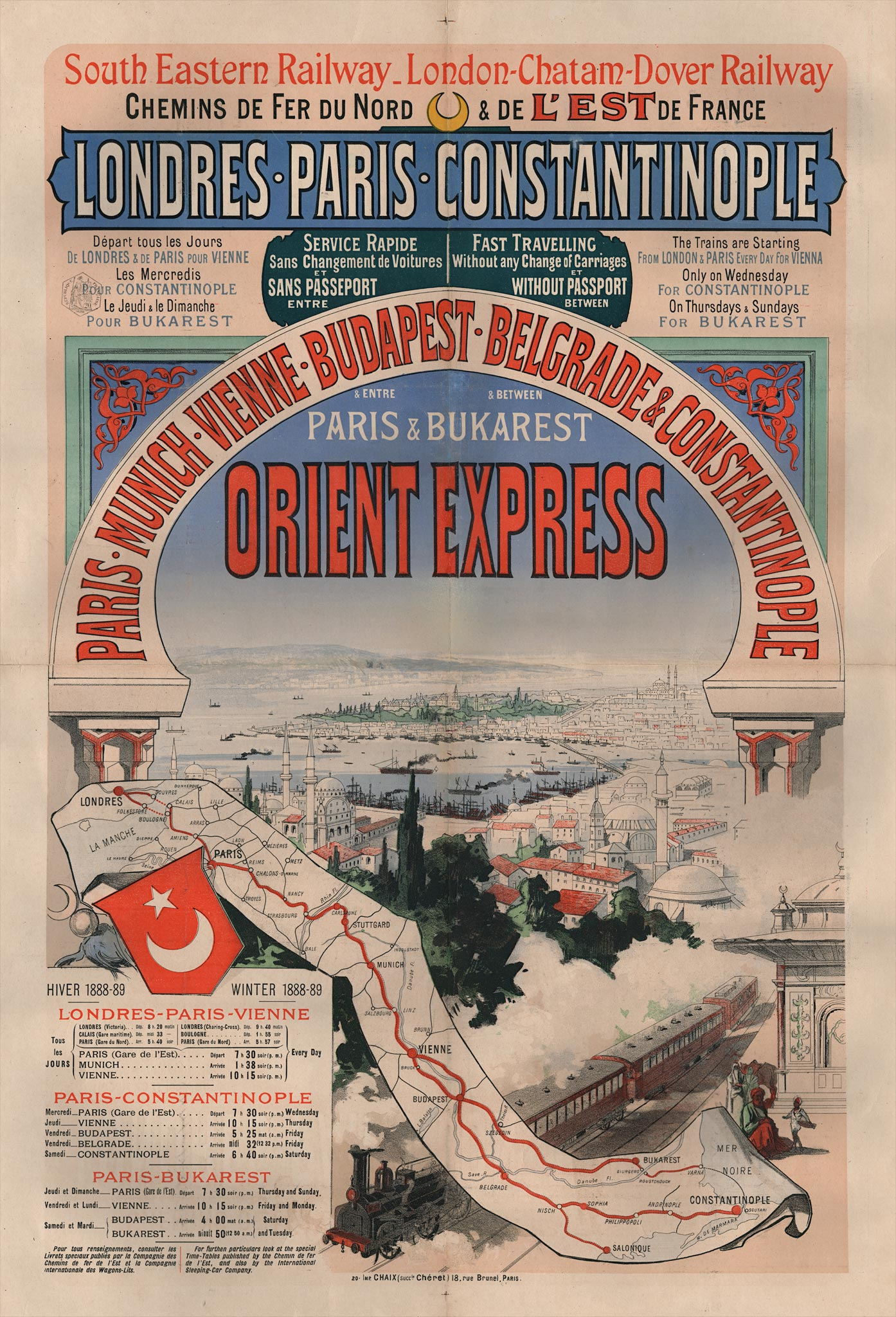
Poster advertising the winter 1888–1889 timetable

The train was officially renamed the Orient Express in 1891.

The onset of the First World War in 1914 saw Orient Express services suspended. They resumed at the end of hostilities in 1918, and in 1919 a more southerly route via the Simplon Tunnel, Milan, Venice, and Trieste opened. Before the war Austria had allowed international services through its territory (which included Trieste at the time) only if they ran via Vienna, but the new route passed entirely south of Austria's postwar borders. The service via Italy was known as the Simplon Orient Express, and it ran in addition to continuing services on the old route. It soon became the most important rail route between Paris and Istanbul.

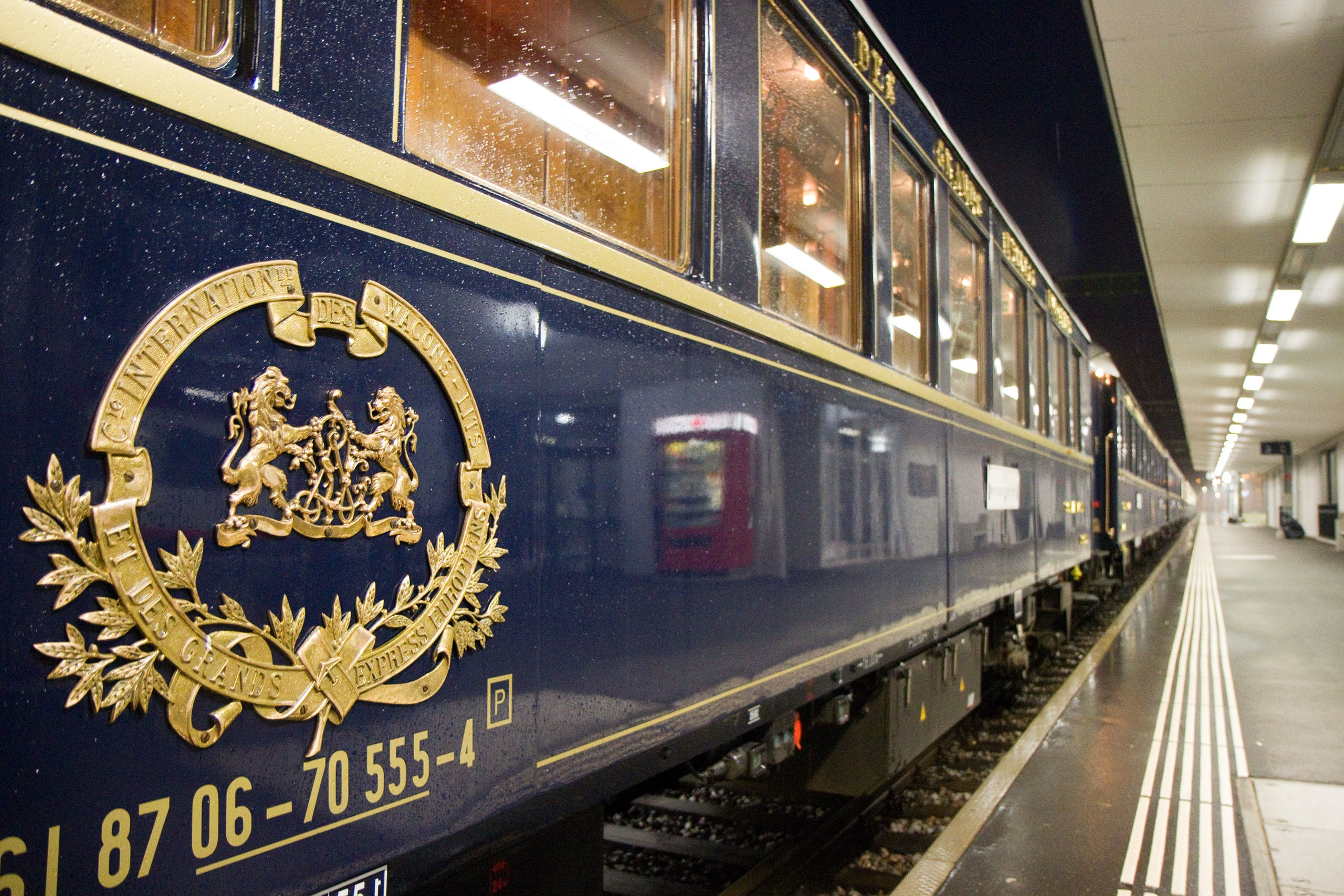
Badge of the Compagnie Internationale des Wagons-Lits on a car of the Orient Express

The 1930s saw the Orient Express services at its most popular, with three parallel services running: the Orient Express, the Simplon Orient Express, and also the Arlberg Orient Express, which ran via the Arlberg railway between Zürich and Innsbruck to Budapest, with sleeper cars running onwards from there to Bucharest and Athens. During this time, the Orient Express acquired its reputation for comfort and luxury, carrying sleeping cars with permanent service and restaurant cars known for the quality of their cuisine. Royalty, nobles, diplomats, business people, and the bourgeoisie in general patronized it. Each of the Orient Express services also incorporated sleeping cars which had run from Calais to Paris, thus extending the service from one end of continental Europe to the other.

The start of the Second World War in 1939 again interrupted the service, which did not resume until 1945. During the war, the German Mitropa company had run some services on the route through the Balkans, but Yugoslav Partisans frequently sabotaged the track, forcing a stop to this service.

Following the end of the war, normal services resumed except on the Athens leg, where the closure of the border between Yugoslavia and Greece prevented services from running. That border re-opened in 1951, but the closure of the Bulgarian–Turkish border from 1951 to 1952 prevented services running to Istanbul during that time. As the Iron Curtain fell across Europe, the service continued to run, but the Communist nations increasingly replaced the Wagon-Lits cars with carriages run by their own railway services.

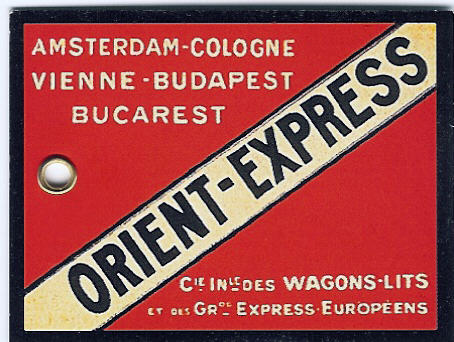
Luggage tag

By 1962, the original Orient Express and Arlberg Orient Express had stopped running, leaving only the Simplon Orient Express. This was replaced in 1962 by a slower service called the Direct Orient Express, which ran daily cars from Paris to Belgrade, and twice-weekly services from Paris to Istanbul and Athens.

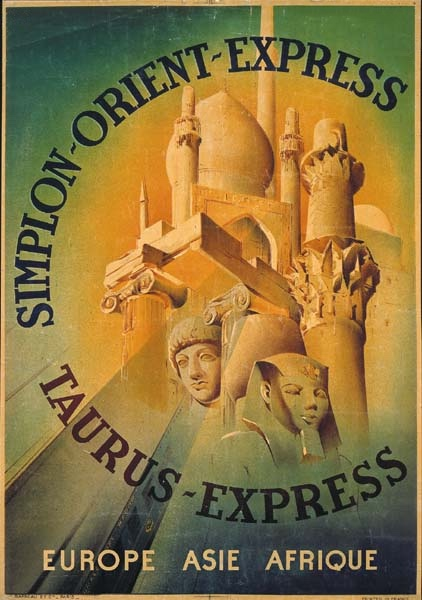
Orient Express poster

In 1971, the Wagon-Lits company stopped running carriages itself and making revenues from a ticket supplement. Instead, it sold or leased all its carriages to the various national railway companies, but continued to provide staff for the carriages. 1976 saw the withdrawal of the Paris–Athens direct service, and in 1977, the Direct Orient Express was withdrawn completely, with the last Paris–Istanbul service running on 19 May of that year.

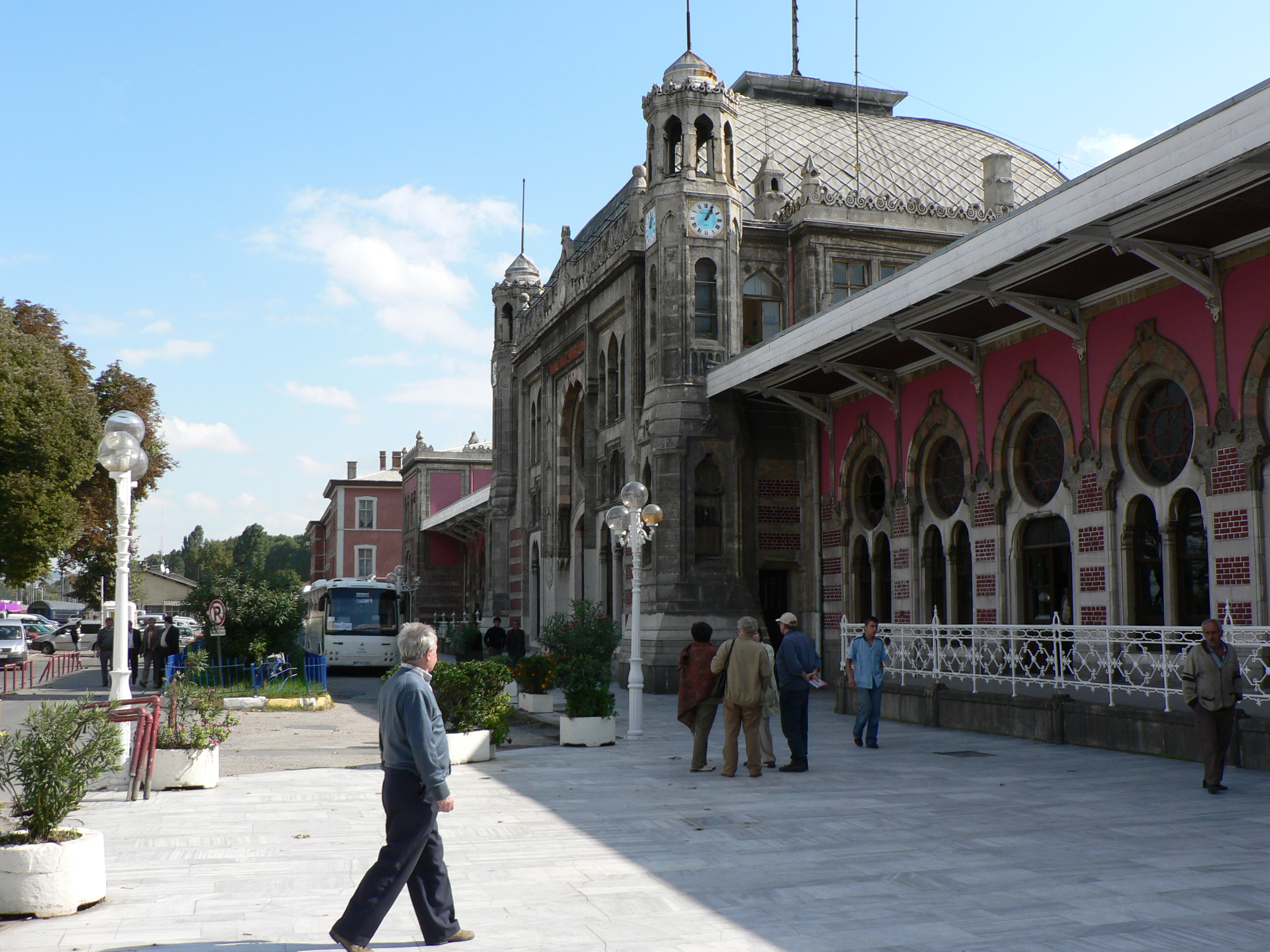
The Sirkeci Terminal in Istanbul

The withdrawal of the Direct Orient Express was thought by many to signal the end of the Orient Express as a whole, but in fact a service under this name continued to run from Paris to Bucharest as before (via Strasbourg, Munich, Vienna, and Budapest). However, a through sleeping car from Paris to Bucharest was only operated until 1982, and was only operated seasonally. This meant that, as Paris–Budapest and Vienna–Bucharest coaches were running overlapped, a journey was only possible with changing carriages – despite the unchanged name and numbering of the train. In 1991 the Budapest-Bucharest leg of the train was discontinued, the new final station now becoming Budapest. In the summer seasons of 1999 and 2000 a sleeping car from Bucharest to Paris reappeared running twice a week, now operated by CFR. This continued until 2001, when the service was cut back to just Paris–Vienna, as a EuroNight train, though the coaches were actually attached to a regular Paris–Strasbourg express for that leg of the journey. This service continued daily, listed in the timetables under the name Orient Express, until 8 June 2007.

With the opening of the LGV Est Paris–Strasbourg high speed rail line on 10 June 2007, the Orient Express service was further cut back to Strasbourg–Vienna, departing nightly at 22:20 from Strasbourg, and still bearing the name, but lost the train numbers 262/263 which it had borne for decades.

The remains of the original train had a convenient connection to the Strasbourg-Paris TGV, but due to the less flexible prices the route became less attractive. In the final years through coaches between Vienna and Karlsruhe (continuing first to Dortmund, then to Amsterdam, and finally to Frankfurt) were attached. The last train with the name Orient-Express (now with a hyphen) departed from Vienna on 10 December 2009, and one day later from Strasbourg.

Between December 2021 and December 2025 an ÖBB Nightjet train ran three times per week on the Paris-Vienna route, although it was not branded as Orient Express.

One of the last known CIWL teak sleeping cars from the period before the First World War can be seen at the former Amfikleia station site in Greece.

== Privately run trains using the name ==
In 1976, the Swiss travel company Intraflug AG first rented, then later bought several CIWL-carriages. They were operated as the Nostalgic Istanbul Orient Express by Seattle-based Society Expeditions. The route went first from Zürich to Istanbul, following the route of the Arlberg Orient Express. In 1983, the 100th anniversary of the Orient Express was celebrated by extending the route to run from Paris to Istanbul. The train ceased operations in 2007.

=== Belmond ===
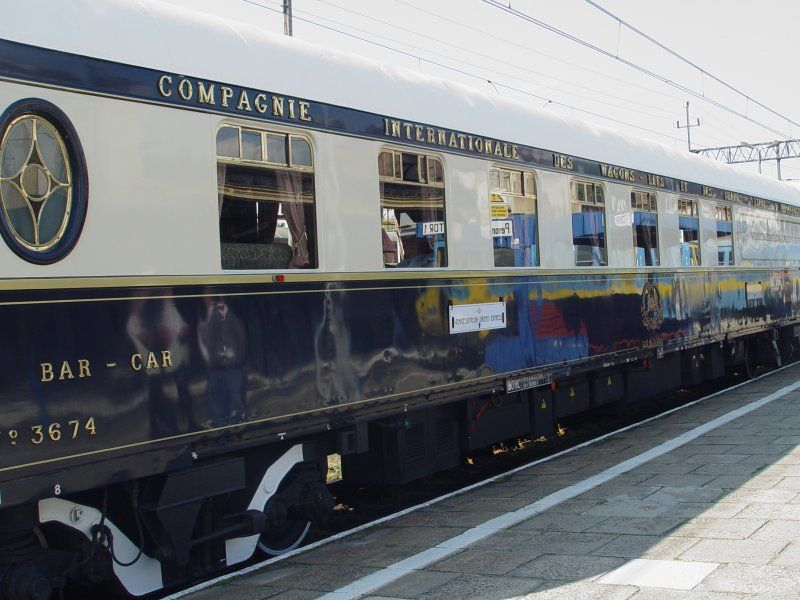
Venice Simplon-Orient-Express in Poland, in 2007

In 1982, the Venice Simplon-Orient-Express was established by businessman James Sherwood as a private venture and is currently owned and operated by Belmond. It operates restored 1920s and 1930s carriages on routes around Europe. It also offered a connecting service from London to Folkestone on the British Pullman, using similarly restored vintage British Pullman cars, but it was announced in April 2023 that due to complications ensuing from Brexit this would cease, and travelers from London would have to take Eurostar to Paris in order to join the Orient Express. The Venice Simplon-Orient-Express operates from March to December and is aimed at leisure travellers. Tickets start at US$3,262 per person and it operates on multiple different routes most notably Paris-Istanbul via Vienna and Budapest. Despite its name, the train runs via the Brenner Pass instead of the Simplon tunnel. Belmond also offers a similarly themed luxury train in Singapore, Malaysia and Thailand, called the Eastern & Oriental Express. Sherwood also operated a chain of Orient Express-branded luxury hotels, licensed from SNCF, owner of the Orient Express branding. The chain was renamed Belmond in 2014 when the branding license ended.

=== Accor ===
In 2017, Accor purchased a 50% stake in the Orient Express brand from SNCF for the right to use the name. In 2018, Accor began renovation work on 17 CIWL carriages from the defunct Nostalgie Istanbul Orient Express, which date back to the 1920s and 1930s. In early 2026, the carriages were displayed at the Musée des Arts Décoratifs within the Louvre in Paris. Accor will carry passengers between Paris and Istanbul beginning in 2027.

== See also ==
- Lists of named passenger trains
- Orient-Express Hotels
- The Last Express
- Taurus Express
- List of train songs
