= El Encanto (Santa Barbara) =

Hotel in Santa Barbara, California established during the early 1900s

General information
- Location: 800 Alvarado Place, Santa Barbara, California 93103, US
- Coordinates: 34°26′22″N 119°42′16″W

Other information
- Number of rooms: 90

Website
- www.elencanto.com

El Encanto is a hotel in Santa Barbara, California. It was established during the early 1900s as the El Encanto Hotel, when it was popular with artists of the plein air school, celebrities and the "carriage trade" from the East Coast. Guests during the early days of Hollywood included Hedy Lamarr, Clark Gable and Carole Lombard.

== Chronology ==
- 1877: The land where the hotel would eventually be built was acquired by entrepreneur Charles A. Storke for $153.75 or $1.25 an acre. The purchase was ridiculed as "Storke's Folly", because of the lack of water and difficult access to the area.
- 1887: After the railway line arrived, Storke sold his "folly" for considerable profit ($25,000) to San Franciscan capitalist Walter Hawley. Hawley's purchase included all but two lots, one of which was titled to Horatio P. and Maria Stone, the property that El Encanto now sits on. Horatio was the city clerk in 1870 and well placed in Santa Barbara society.
- 1911: Accessibility to the Riviera neighborhood, located high in the hills with fabulous vistas of the Pacific Ocean, was improved by the installation of streetcar service on Alameda Padre Serra
- 1912: James Warren, president of the County National Bank, built dormitories and several ten-room houses and cottages on his four-acre property across the street from the State Normal School. These are all part of El Encanto today. His intention for the cottages was to house faculty and students. The architects were E. Russell Ray and Winsor Soule, with well-known landscape architect Charles Frederick Eaton. Water service through the Cold Spring Tunnel was established in the neighborhood, making residential development viable.
- 1913: Spurred by the college campus's imminent arrival, a group of investors, calling themselves the Riviera Company, bought the Hawley Heights tract and additional acreage. The majority stockholder was banker George Batchelder, who came to be known as the "Father of the Riviera". He named the development site "The Riviera" because it reminded him of the French coast overlooking the Mediterranean. The Riviera Company planted hundreds of oak seedlings, and ahead of his time, Batchelder put wires and cables underground and insisted that homes be laid out so as not to block neighbours' views.
- 1917: Student rentals for the Normal School proved unsuccessful. In May 1917, Mr. Warren announced plans to develop a cottage hotel to cater to the growing tourism market.
- 1918: El Encanto Hotel and Garden Villas hosted its first dinner on New Year's Eve, December 31, 1917. The official opening took place on February 2, 1918.
- 1919: Several adjacent acres were purchased and the first Spanish Colonial Revival designed cottages were added.
- 1923: D. M. Linnard of San Francisco acquired the hotel.
- 1928: The A. K. Bennett Hotel Corporation purchased the hotel, as well as three additional acres of adjacent land. Over the next few years, twelve new bungalows were constructed in the Spanish Colonial Revival style. A precursor to the timeshare industry, many were designed and built to serve as the winter residences of business tycoons, including the founders of Time magazine, Pepsi-Cola and Arrow Shirts. The cottages' red-tile roofs made them distinctively different from the Craftsman cottages.
- 1933–1950: El Encanto enjoyed increased popularity as a Hollywood hideaway, and President Franklin D. Roosevelt stayed in cottage 320.
- 1938–1943: Frank J. McCoy, proprietor of the Santa Maria Inn, bought El Encanto.
- 1943–1948: Mr. and Mrs. Harry E. Thompson became the new managers and owners, when they bought the hotel for approximately $150,000.
- 1948–1955: The son of Mr. and Mrs. Harry E. Thompson, John E. Thompson took over operation of the hotel.
- 1955–1961: The Tobert R. Lurie family purchased El Encanto for approximately $500,000. The family already owned El Mirasol Hotel, also in Santa Barbara.
- 1961–1963: El Encanto was sold to Maynard W. Kennett for $530,000. Upon his death it passed to his widow Emma C. Kennett.
- 1976: Ron Uhles acquired the property and constructed 20 additional cottages adjacent to the Mission Ridge Road.
- 1977: Under Chef Armando Felix, the dining room was marketed under the name Casa Madrid. The same year, the Friden Hotel Company (FHC), headed by Eric Friden, took over the hotel and began a series of renovations.
- 1984: A three-year renovation project was completed, giving El Encanto a "French Country" look.
- 1991: El Encanto underwent a further facelift with a new fountain installed in the entrance area.
- 2003: Eric Friden died in a polo accident. His brother, Rennick Andreoli, assumed Presidency of El Encanto and the Friden Hotel Company.
- 2004: The Friden family announced its intent to sell El Encanto to Orient-Express Hotels, Trains & Cruises. The family's decision to sell was based in large part on Orient-Express' reputation for restoring historic properties. The hotel closed for extensive renovation, in cooperation with Santa Barbara's Historic Landmarks Commission, to ensure that the hotel continued to reflect its original design.
- 2013: In March 2013 El Encanto re-opened as an Orient-Express Hotel, with a new restaurant, bar, outdoor pool and spa. Its gardens, with many old trees, were also restored.
- 2014: Orient-Express Hotels Ltd. changed its name to Belmond Ltd. At that time the hotel was renamed Belmond El Encanto.
- 2025: Belmond sells the hotel to Tyler Mateen, Justin Mateen, and the Cayton family for $82.2 million, with the new owners planning to invest an additional $40 million in renovations to the property over the following three years. El Encanto becomes a member of The Leading Hotels of the World consortium.
