= Belmond La Samanna =

Resort in Saint Martin

La Samanna, A Belmond Hotel, St Martin
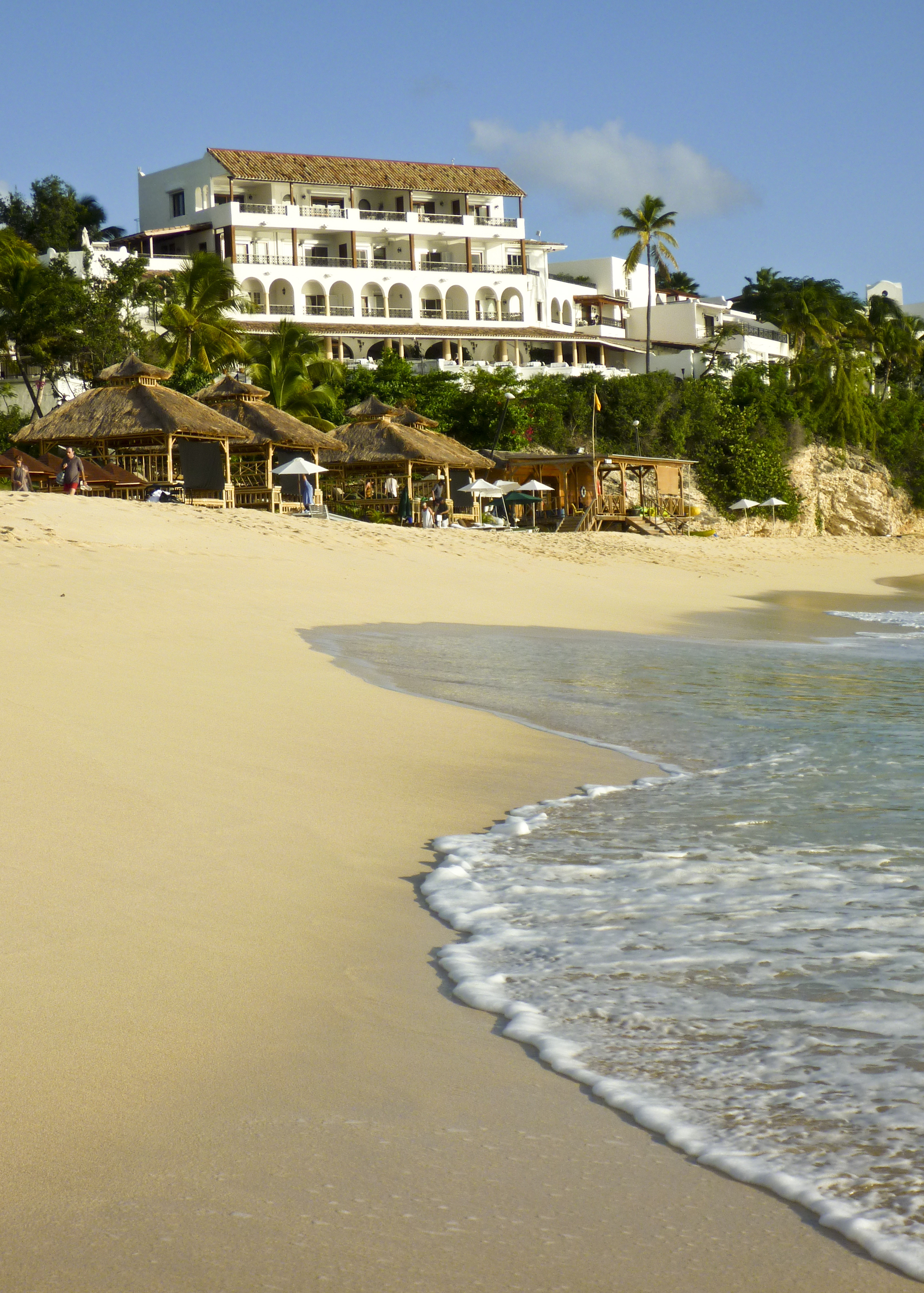
- Interactive map of the La Samanna, A Belmond Hotel, St Martin area

General information
- Location: PO Box 4077, 97064, St Martin, CEDEX, French West Indies
- Coordinates: 18.055785°N 63.138906°W
- Management: Belmond Ltd.

Design and construction
- Architect: Happy Ward

Other information
- Number of rooms: 83

La Samanna, A Belmond Hotel, St Martin is a Caribbean luxury resort, located on the half-French, half-Dutch island of Saint Martin in the French West Indies. It overlooks Baie Longue, one of the island's longest and most secluded beaches.

Its original owners were James and Nicole Frankel and it was designed and built by architect Happy Ward, of the Barbados firm Robertson Ward, created in the style of a traditional Mediterranean villa. Construction began in 1971 and was completed in 1973. Frankel named it after his three children—Samantha (now Mrs.Ivan Lendl), Anouk and Nathalie—combining the letters of their names and adding the French prefix, “La.”

In 1996, Orient-Express Hotels acquired La Samanna and embarked on a programme of renovation. The resort at one point stocked a cellar with 12,000 bottles of wine including 146 varieties of Bordeaux. It had its own private label: Hospices de Beaune La Samanna.

In 2014 Orient-Express Hotels changed its name to Belmond Ltd. At that time the hotel was renamed Belmond La Samanna.

In 2019, La Samanna underwent over twenty million dollars in refurbishing and redesign led by Muza Lab, a London-based design firm.

Situated on 55 acres of beachfront, La Samanna consists of 83 rooms and suites and eight villas.
