= Belmond Hotel das Cataratas =

Hotel das Cataratas, A Belmond Hotel
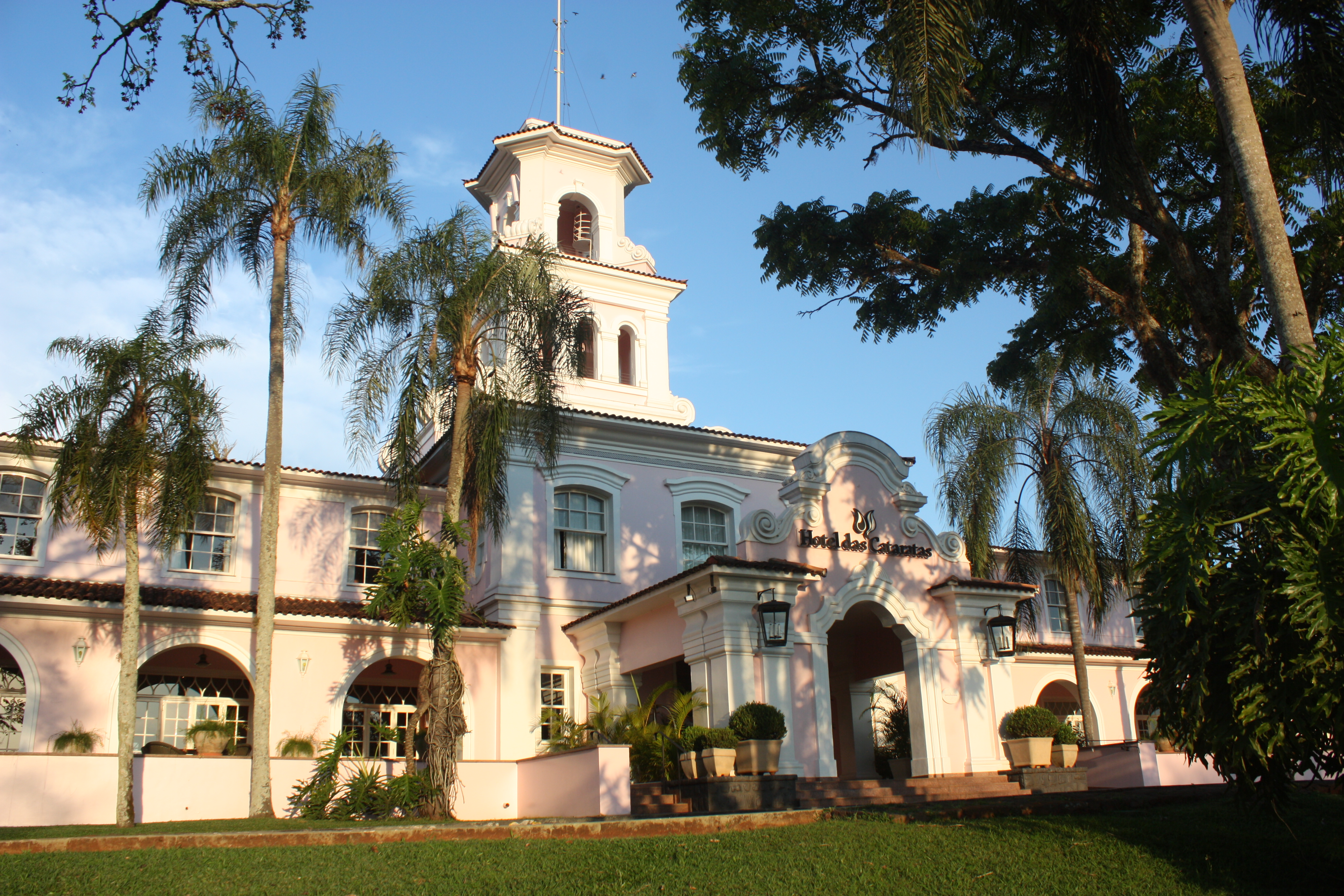
- Interactive map of the Hotel das Cataratas, A Belmond Hotel area

General information
- Location: Rodovia Br 469, Km 32 - Iguassu National Park, Foz do Iguassu 85855 – 750, Brazil
- Coordinates: 25.6843°S 54.4387°W
- Operator: Belmond Ltd.

Other information
- Number of rooms: 193

Website
- belmond.com/hoteldascataratas

The Hotel das Cataratas, A Belmond Hotel, is a historic resort, the only hotel in Iguassu National Park, a UNESCO World Heritage Centre in Brazil, and has access to Iguassu Falls.

== History ==
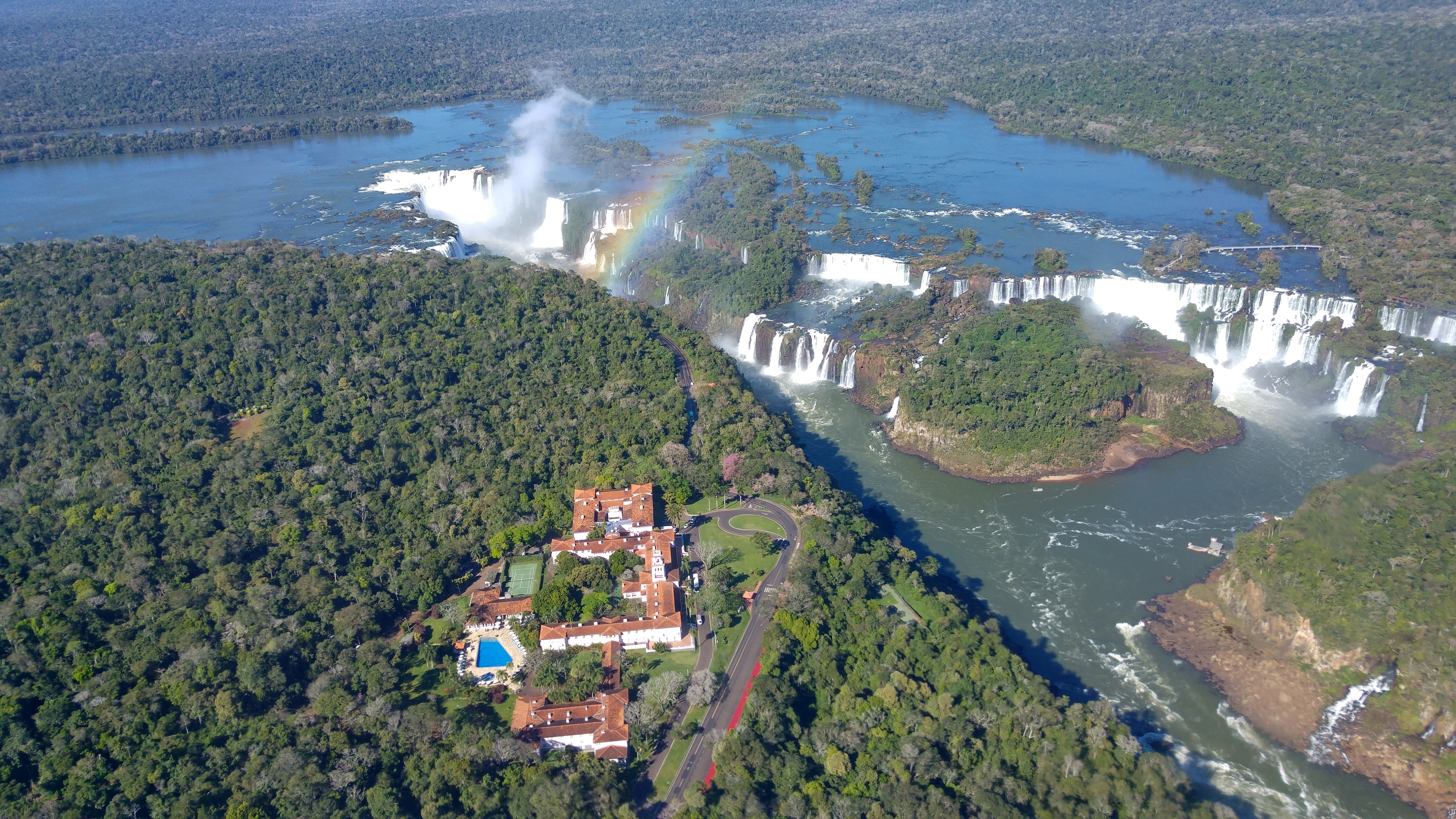
Belmond Hotel das Cataratas, with Iguassu Falls directly behind it

The two-story Portuguese colonial style hotel opened in 1958. Two further wings were added in 1971 and 1982.

The main building houses the reception area, a bar and restaurant with terrace and an outdoor pool area with a casual restaurant.

The hotel was the first property in Latin America to qualify for the ISO 14001 Environmental Management certification in recognition of its ecological operating policies.

In 2007, the hotel was acquired by Orient-Express Hotels, which embarked on a US$20 million refurbishment programme (completed in 2010). In 2014 the company changed its name to Belmond Ltd. At that time the hotel was renamed Belmond Hotel das Cataratas

In 2018, Belmond Hotel das Cataratas was the first five-star hotel in South America to win a "Star Awards" from Forbes Travel Guide.
