= La Résidence Phou Vao =

General information
- Location: Naviengkham Village, Phu Vao Road, Luang Prabang 06000, Laos

Other information
- Number of suites: 34
- Number of restaurants: 1

Website
- https://laresidencehotels.com/phou-vao

La Résidence Phou Vao is a luxury resort in Luang Prabang in Laos. Luang Prabang sits at the junction of the Mekong and Nam Khan rivers. The resort has large gardens with a spa and swimming pool which directly faces Phou si hill.

== Royal Era ==
Historically used as a royal retreat and vantage point, Phou Vao (also historically associated with the residence of Prince Souvanna Phouma) transitioned from a center of royal/neutralist power as the old royal capital of Luang Prabang saw its court culture suppressed under the new communist administration. The Phou Vao gained significance during the 1960 Laotian coups, Phou Vaoa road became the boundary between the poor majority and the Low density populated ulterior Luang Prabang. In this era the Hilltop estate was rarely used

== Communist Era ==
After the North Vietnamese and the Pathet Lao forces captured Luang Prabang in 1975, the Royal Estate was used by the Lao government to host politicians and other high-level visitors.

== Hotel Era ==
- 1990 Mittaphap Hotel, Mittaphap will later become a Lao hotel group
- 2002 Pansea Phou Vou Hotel
- 2004 La Residence Phou Voa, Pansea Orient-Express Alliance Hotel
- 2006 La Residence Phou Voa, Orient Express
- 2014 La Residence Phou Voa, Belmond
- La Residence Phou Voa, HMD Asia
