= Belmond Maroma Resort & Spa =

Maroma
- Interactive map of the Maroma area
- Former names: Belmond Maroma Resort and Spa

General information
- Location: Carretera Cancún-Tulum, Km 51, 77710 Riviera Maya, Quintana Roo, Mexico
- Coordinates: 20°44′25″N 86°57′57″W
- Management: Belmond Ltd.

Design and construction
- Architect: Jose Luis Moreno

Other information
- Number of rooms: 63

Website
- [Official site https://www.belmond.com/hotels/north-america/mexico/riviera-maya/belmond-maroma-resort-and-spa/]

Belmond Maroma Resort and Spa is a hotel on Mexico's Riviera Maya, 30 miles south of Cancún. It was built by Mexico City architect Jose Luis Moreno a specialist in designing restaurants and small hotels, and opened in 1995.

Moreno had first visited the area in 1976, when Cancún had few hotels and an airport terminal with a thatched roof. He first built a home for himself and then another which he planned to sell. In 1988 a hurricane destroyed the second house and he decided to rebuild it as a hotel.

The hotel is built from local materials, including palm, bamboo and stone quarried in Mérida (the Yucatán's old Hispanic capital). Two- or three-storey buildings are dotted on the 25-acre beachfront portion of the 500-acre property, linked by stone walkways through the jungle.

The resort was constructed without formal blueprints as Moreno always drew his free-flowing designs in the sand. Once he had his concept, a family of local masons, with whom he had worked on other projects, came to implement his designs.

In 2002 the resort was acquired by Orient-Express Hotels, which in 2014 changed its name to Belmond Ltd. At that time the hotel was renamed Belmond Maroma Resort & Spa The company still uses the same family of Maya masons that have been working at the resort for over four decades and have added new oceanfront spa villas, expanded the restaurant and bar, added two new pools and built Kinan Spa.
