= Belmond Grand Hotel Timeo =

Hotel in Sicily

General information
- Location: Via Teatro Greco 59, 98039, Taormina, Sicily
- Management: Belmond Ltd.

Other information
- Number of rooms: 70

Website
- belmond.com/grandhoteltimeo

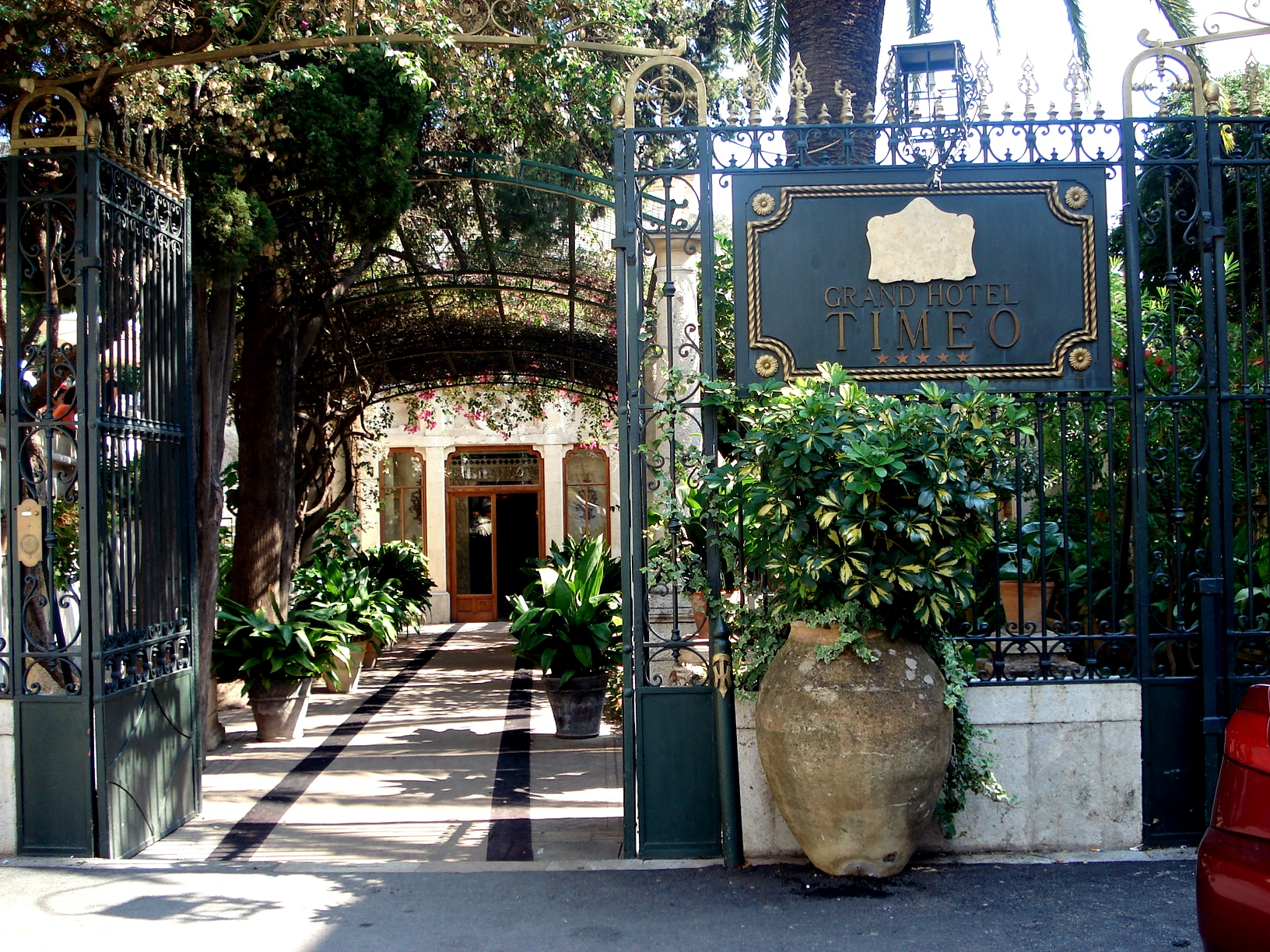
The Hotel Timeo in Taormina

Belmond Grand Hotel Timeo is a hotel located at the centre of Taormina in Sicily, adjacent to the Greek Theatre.

== Chronology ==
- 1787: Johann Wolfgang von Goethe wrote for the first time about the Greek Theatre in his Italian Journey
- 1863: Otto Gèleng, a 20-year-old Prussian baron, visited Taormina to paint watercolours and took residence in a private house belonging to Don Francesco La Floresta. Don Francesco had started renting rooms in 1850 and called his house "Timeo", the name of the founder of the Greek city "Tauromenion" in 358 BC. Geleng’s watercolours of the snow-capped Etna and its green slopes overlooking the sea created enormous interest in Berlin and Paris, resulting in a series of artists visiting Taormina, staying at Don Francesco’s "Timeo" house.
- 1874: Don Francesco sold an orange field and with the proceeds bought a house right below the Greek Theatre, where he continued his activity with five guest rooms on the spot where Belmond Grand Timeo now stands.
- 1883: Don Francesco and his son Giuseppe enlarged the Timeo to 12 rooms. The American writer and art critic Bernhard Berenson remembers the Timeo as the only hotel in Taormina.
- 1896: Giuseppe La Floresta inherited the Timeo after the death of Don Francesco and added 60 new rooms to the existing 12 between 1896 and 1906. By now, the Timeo was a hotel of great standing, visited by emperors, kings and grand dukes of European courts who wanted to spend winter in a warm climate. Thanks to this mild weather the Timeo was a winter resort and closed between May and October. In 1896, Kaiser Wilhelm II of Germany visited Taormina, stayed at the Timeo, and returned in 1904 and 1906 when he rented the entire hotel for a month for his family and court. Luxury tourism kept increasing until the First World War and thereafter, from 1920 to 1929, during the time of the Belle Epoque in Europe
- 1906: The Timeo was first visited by Edward VII, King of England, and his wife Augusta, followed by further visits in 1907 and 1908.
- 1925: The English writer D. H. Lawrence stayed at the Timeo for some time, while he lived in a villa in Northern Italy. At the time he wrote Lady Chatterley’s Lover. When Giuseppe died, the Timeo was inherited by his son, Francesco, nick-named Don Ciccino, who continued to manage the hotel. During the Second World War, the Timeo was requisitioned for a number of years by the British Royal Air Force.
- 1943: On 9 July, heavy bombing damaged the Timeo and large portion of Taormina, but by 1947 life had returned to normal.
- 1948: From this year until the end of the 1950s, the Timeo had as its guests Jean Cocteau, Jean Marais, Roger Peyrefitte, Tennessee Williams and Truman Capote.
- 1966: After the death of Don Ciccino, the reins of the hotel passed to his daughters, who continued at the hotel for another 15 years.
- 1981: The Timeo was sold by the Floresta family to Gaetano Graci, who totally refurbished and modernised the hotel.
- 1998: The Franza family from Messina purchased the Timeo and added a meeting centre and pool. The family also purchased Belmond Villa Sant’Andrea in Mazzarò Bay, beside the sea at Taormina.
- 2000: The Film Festival "Taormina Arte" (Taormina Film Fest) was inaugurated, attracting large numbers of visitors to Taormina and Grand Hotel Timeo.
- 2010: In January, the Franza family sold both Grand Hotel Timeo and Villa Sant’Andrea to Orient-Express Hotels.
- 2014: The company changed its name to Belmond Ltd. At that time the hotel was renamed Belmond Grand Hotel Timeo
