= Napasai =

Resort hotel in Koh Samui, Thailand

Napasai Samui
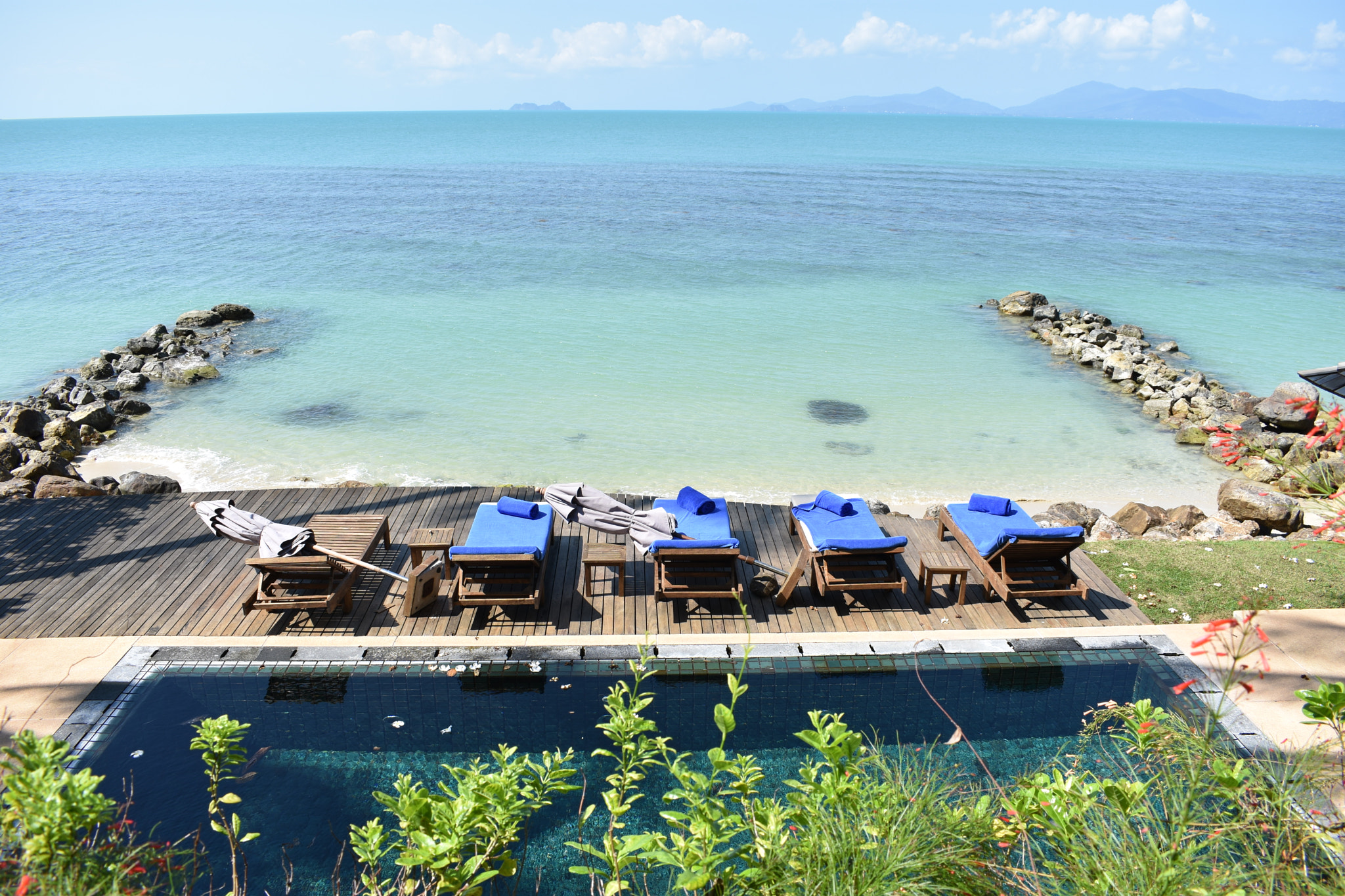
- Napasai Samui, Koh Samui, Thailand.
- Former names: Napasai Samui

General information
- Location: 65/10 Baan Tai, Maenam, Koh Samui, Surat Thani, 84330, Thailand
- Opening: February 2004

Other information
- Number of suites: 24

Website
- napasaisamui.com

Napasai is a resort hotel on the northern coast of Koh Samui, an island off the eastern edge of mainland Thailand. It opened in February 2004. Robert Molinari and Stanislas Rollin, who co-founded Pansea Hotels & Resorts, acquired the Maenam beach land on which the resort sits.

Originally developed by Pansea Hotels & Resorts and named 'Pansea Samui', it was acquired by Orient-Express Hotels in 2006 and renamed 'Napasai'. In 2014 Orient-Express Hotels Ltd. changed its name to Belmond Ltd. and the hotel was renamed Belmond Napasai and last update on 2025 was change to NAPASAI SAMUI.

The property has 67 villas, of which nine are one-bedroom villas. It occupies 43 acres. The resort has bougainvillea, palm trees and frangipani. In 2010 development work took place to expand its private beach by 1,800 square metres.

In 2011 a lagoon and underwater nature reserve were created just offshore. Also part of this programme was the addition of an orchid farm and development of the hotel's spa and a 17-acre tropical garden. Classes for Muay Thai (Thai boxing), cooking, language, massage, leather carving, drawing and photography take place in the gardens.
