= Belmond Sanctuary Lodge =

Hotel in Cusco, Peru

- Interactive map of the Belmond Sanctuary Lodge area

General information
- Location: Machu Picchu, Cusco, Peru
- Coordinates: 13.1660°S 72.5429°W
- Management: Belmond Ltd.

Other information
- Number of rooms: 31

Website
- belmond.com/sanctuarylodge

Belmond Sanctuary Lodge is a small hotel situated at the entrance to the Machu Picchu Inca citadel. It is the only hotel at this World Heritage Site, and can be accessed by foot or by rail.

The explorer Hiram Bingham rediscovered Machu Picchu in 1911, 9 years after Agustín Lizárraga, and the site of this hotel was used as a place for researchers to stay from 1911 to 1946. The site included storage rooms where tools needed for work on the site could be kept.

The site changed hands several times, becoming the property of the regional government of Cusco, before passing to a company controlled by the Sousa Family, Peru Orient Express Hotels, today Peru Belmond Hotels. The property was then renovated under the supervision of Peru's National Institute of Culture.

== Chronology ==
- 1911: Explorer Hiram Bingham arrived at Machu Picchu and publicized its existence to the world. From shortly thereafter until 1946 researchers and guards who came to the citadel would stay in a small building on what is the site of today’s Belmond Sanctuary Lodge.
- 1947: A hotel called Entur Peru, part of the Peruvian hotel chain of the same name, replaced the original building.
- 1980: The hotel was renamed Enturin and became the property of the regional government of Cusco.
- 1995: A public tender saw Peru Hoteles awarded a 30-year concession to run the hotel.
- 1999: Orient-Express Hotels took charge of operations of both the lodge and Hotel Monasterio in Cusco.
- 1999: The lodge reopened after renovations completed under supervision by Peru’s National Institute of Culture.
- 2010: Torrential rain wipes out train access to Machu Picchu. Belmond Sanctuary Lodge helps stranded tourists
- 2014: Orient-Express Hotels changed its name to Belmond Ltd. At that time the hotel was renamed Belmond Sanctuary Lodge
