= Belmond Villa Sant'Andrea =

Hotel in Sicily, Italy

General information
- Location: Via Nationale 137, 98039 Taormina Mare, Sicily, Italy
- Management: Belmond Ltd.

Other information
- Number of rooms: 60

Website
- belmond.com/villasant'andrea

Belmond Villa Sant’Andrea is a hotel on Sicily's Bay of Mazzaro. It was built in the late 1800s as a private villa by an Englishman called Robert Trewhella.

The hotel was purchased in 2010 by Orient-Express Hotels Ltd. which in March 2014 changed its name to Belmond Ltd. At that time Villa Sant'Andrea was renamed Belmond Villa Sant'Andrea.

Today the hotel has a restaurant specialising in seafood, a bar, a swimming pool and sub-tropical gardens beside the bay.
