= Tivoli Hotel, Panama =

Former historic hotel

Coordinates: 8.9625567°N 79.544326°W

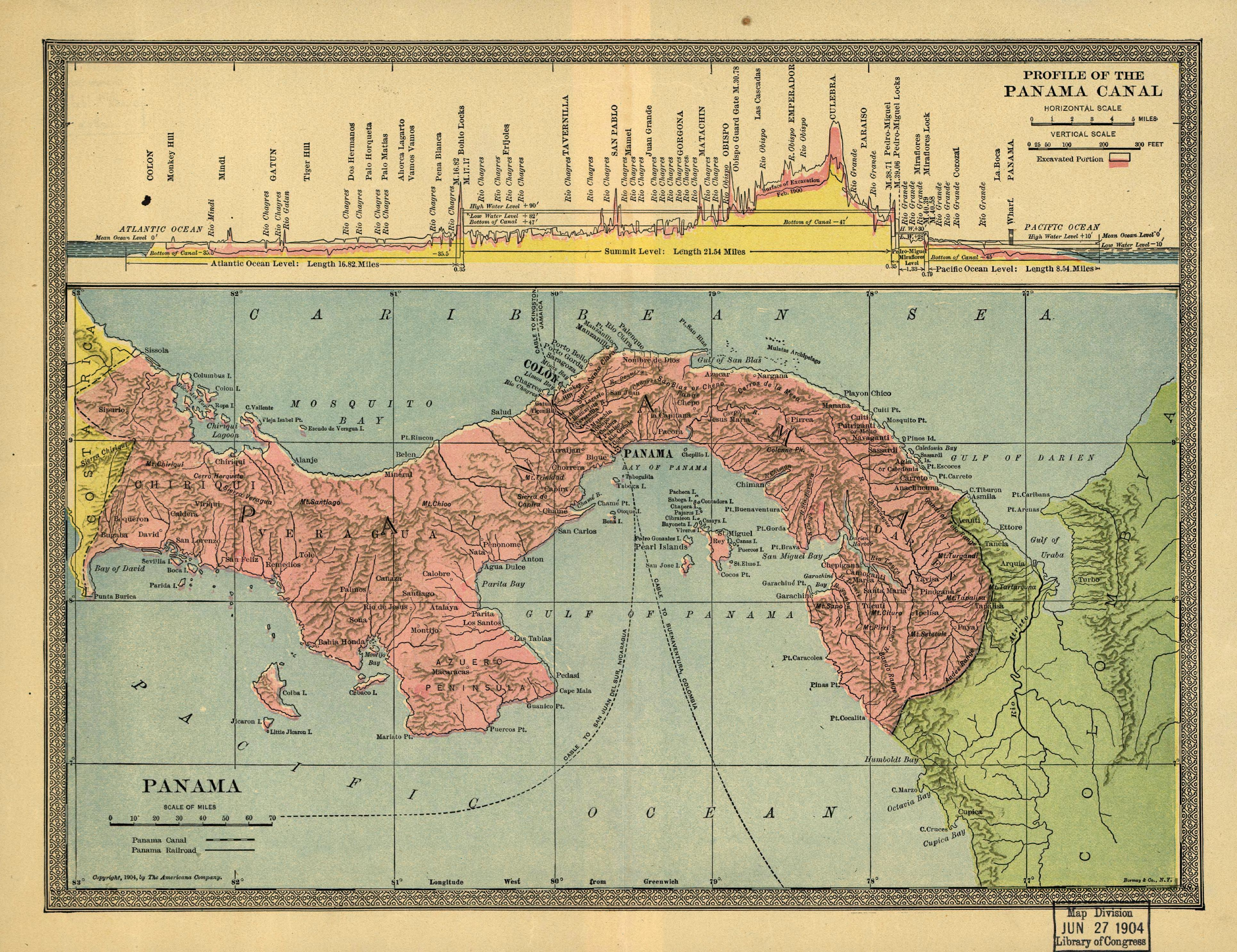
Panama 1904

Tivoli Hotel in Ancón district of Panama City, Republic of Panama, was a historic hotel. US president and Mrs. Teddy Roosevelt were considered the first guests to stay at the Tivoli on November 15, 1906. The grand hotel later served many dignitaries and celebrities, from royalty to film stars, from presidents to sports heroes for years. The Tivoli served luncheon to several hundred passengers every time a cruise ship passed by Panama Canal. After being converted, later, to The Tivoli Guest House, it was officially closed on April 15, 1971. According to Panama Canal Museum the grand Tivoli Hotel served as the centerpiece of Canal Zone society. The hotel derived its name from the name of the hill; "Tivoli hill" on which it was built. This hotel was located in Ancón on the southern slope of Ancon Hill overlooking the Bay of Panama. Tivoli hill was named after the famous hill in Rome, Italy.

== Political history ==
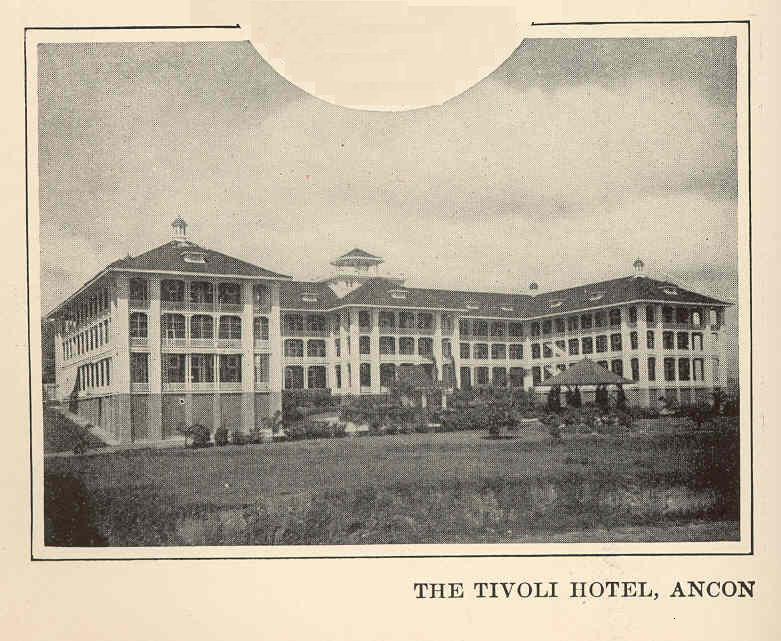
Historic Tivoli Hotel, Panama

The other historic value aspect added to this hotel is, according to Blake (2018), how it held symbolic and material importance for those challenging the status quo. Referring to the 400 bullet holes left in the hotel walls, after both violent and non-violent actions, they retraces the entangled relationship between anti-colonial struggle and international tourism. Tivoli was a site for January 9, 1964 anti-American riots over sovereignty of the Panama Canal Zone with a death toll of 28 people. In this sense Tivoli was symbolizing a site of social privilege and also as sites of protest. It situated strategically at the crossroads of political and economic power in the mid-twentieth century which was an era of decolonisation. The hotel also became home for political refugees; at one time, four ex-presidents of Panama were refuged there.

== Tourism ==
Tivoli came into existence in between two industrial revolutions; latter starting to boom in 1903 While Panama Canal was described as the geopolitical strategy to make the United States the most powerful nation on earth, it also became the path by which a colonial route of commerce and military conquest became a route of tourism in the twentieth century. The decade followed by the birth of Tivoli, the golden era of the grand hotel, marks a historic shift, classically known "diseased to desired" in US traveling culture. The Panama Canal was transforming the isthmus dubbed as "white man's graveyard" into a tropical playground for tourists. The United States had to fight and win the battle against malaria before achieving any goals within isthmus.Tourism to the Caribbean region emerged within the crucible of US empire building and its associated scientific and infrastructural developments. Tivoli played its role well, as the pioneer among those emerging new spaces, in the modern day tourism of Panama isthmus.

== Construction ==
The purpose for the hotel was to provide temporary accommodation for Panama Canal construction workers. It was a strategic location being located in Ancón, just across the street from the Canal Zone/Panama border. At a time Panama was not quite ready to accommodate the boom of influx of visitors who were on official Canal business and visiting relatives of Canal employees, the Tivoli became open commercially to visitors to the isthmus since there was a shortage of adequate hotel facilities.

The dual purpose of housing workers with minimum facilities and providing designated hotel room changed the construction plan from initial metal and plaster structure to a frame structure with a brick center-section. Panama Canal Museum (2018) vividly describes this situation as "Many times during the construction days the ballroom was turned into a sleeping area; and the workers slept on cots or, if none was available, on the tops of billiard tables".

When the central rear three-story wing was added in 1911 the hotel guests were also able to enjoy its first electric elevator ride. Following year hot water was plumbed into all bathrooms. In 1913 the present porte-cochere replaced the covered front steps. The original bar was covered with an awning. What was later named as the Pergola Bar was added in 1913. The bar started serving liquor in 1936.

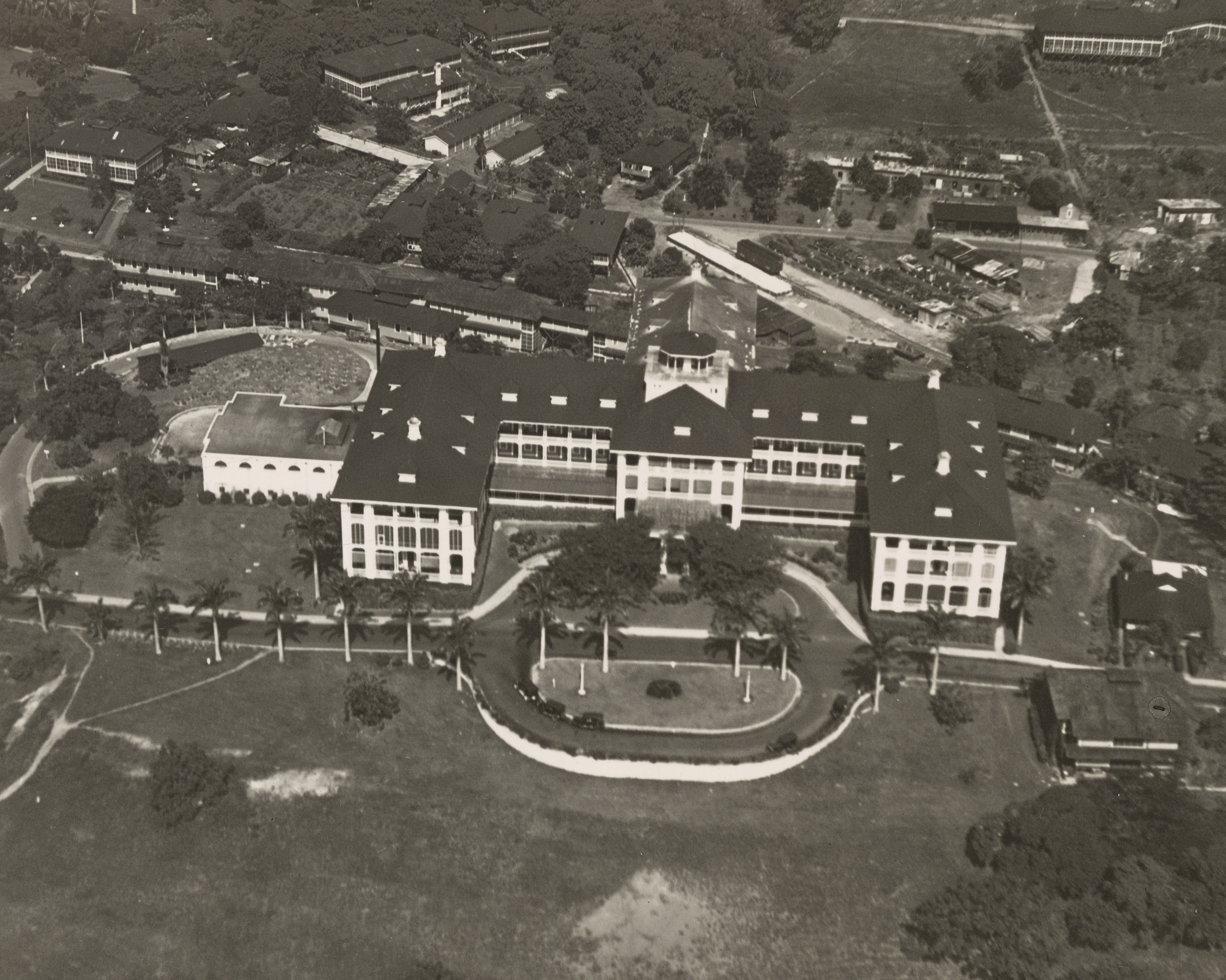
Tivoli Hotel on June 16, 1923

A sprinkler system garlanded the entire structure when the hotel was condemned as a firetrap in 1922 by the Canal Zone Fire Division. Half a century after serving the Panama City as a grand hotel, the aging building was re-designated as "The Tivoli Guest house,"to stop taking reservation for the hotel guests. The guesthouse then started serving locals as a venue, over the years, in the Canal Zone for wedding receptions, school proms, gala dances and balls, luncheon and dinner parties, happy hours and other social gatherings while providing accommodation to Panama Canal employees, their families and guests. According to Panama Canal Museum (2018), sadly there were some exceptions such as " Some permanent guests, however, were allowed to reside there, including Mrs. Winifred Ewing, who stayed at the hotel as a bride in 1907, shortly after it opened, and returned to reside there in 1968 until it closed"

There were many newer and more modern hotels started erupting in Panama City, at the turn of the 1970, when the grand hotel was graying to be a septuagenarian amid high cost of maintaining the wooden structure. The Tivoli Guest House was officially closed on April 15, 1971.

== Rooms ==
The original Fern Room was first occupied by President and Mrs.Theodore Roosevelt and since then was called "Roosevelt suite" for many years according to the first register of the old hotel. In addition there had been a plaque which once decorated the "Roosevelt Suite" There was wide front porch of the Hotel upon the entrance facing the circular driveway at the center of the hotel. The other notable suite was the "Duke and Duchess of Balboa" There are no documented evidences indicating total number of rooms available in the hotel during various phases.

== Menu ==
The hotel was renowned for its fine dining and excellent cuisine among the visitors and guests and gourmet banquets for several hundred passengers of cruise ship. According to Panama Canal Museum (2018) "in its heydays, One menu in 1907, featuring landmarks along the Canal route at that time, offered such fare as Ancon Turtle soup, Tabernilla Pickles, Mount Hope Olives, Corozal Potatoes, Culebra Fillet of Beef, Brazos Brooks Asparagus, La Boca Roast Turkey, Pedro Miguel Jelly, Potted Gatun Birds, Bas Obispo Punch, Cristobal Balls, Matachin Ice Cream, Gorgona Cake, Colon Cheese, Empire Coffee, Cemetery Road Cigarettes and Las Cascadas Cigars".

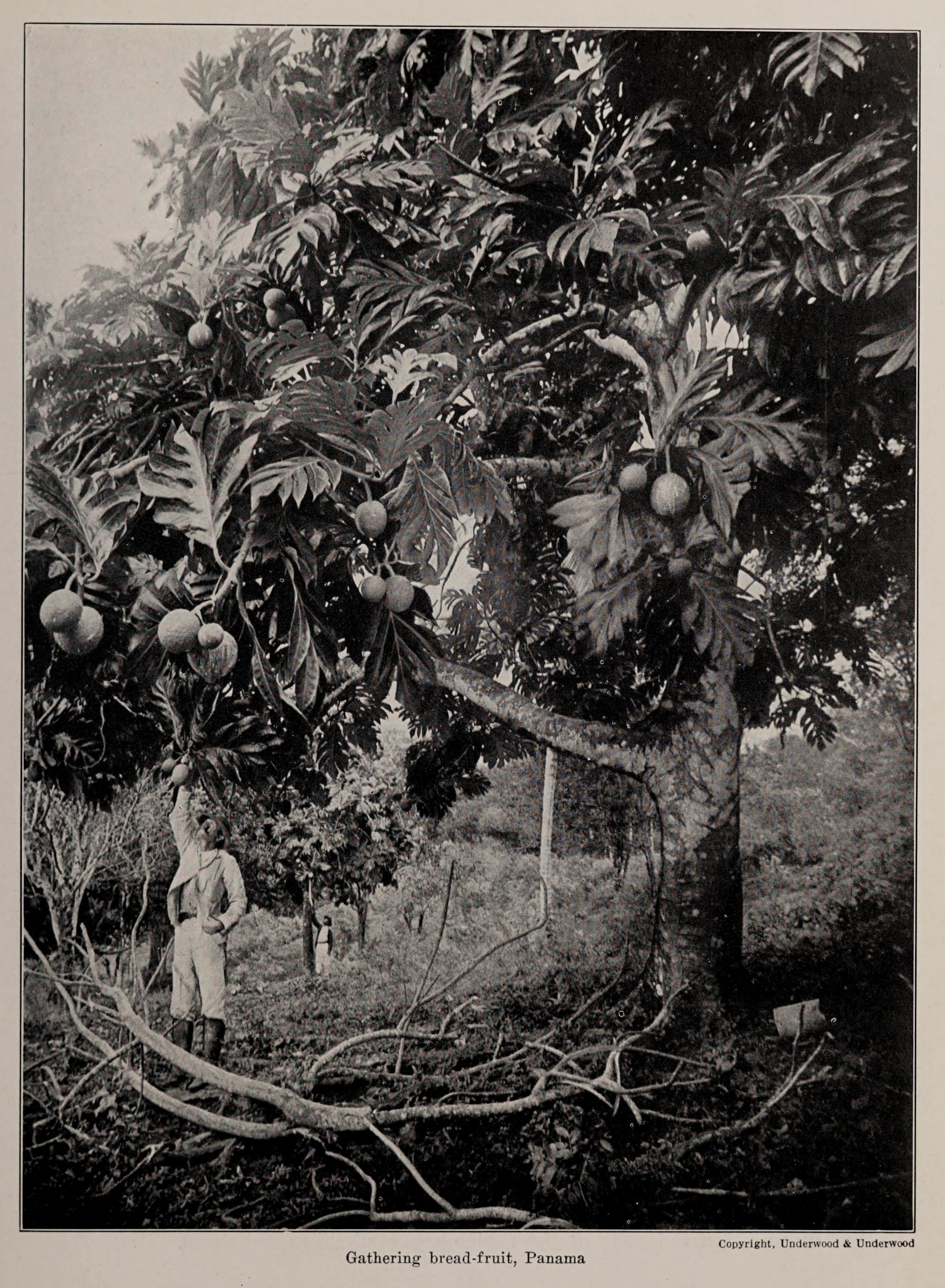
Gathering bread-fruit, Panama, photo from The Encyclopedia of Food by Artemas Ward

The menu was carved out to meet the exclusive demands of the hotels visitors and guests such as movie actors, generals, congressmen, admirals, and just plain tourists. During the war years, the Pergola Bar was said to have been crowded with intelligence agents, newspapermen and contractors.
