= Belmond Miraflores Park =

Hotel in Lima, Peru

- Location in Lima

General information
- Location: Av malecon de la reserva, Lima 1035, Lima, Peru
- Coordinates: 12°8′7″S 77°1′38″W

Belmond Miraflores Park is a 5-star luxury hotel in Lima, Peru. The hotel is located in Miraflores District, along a tree-lined avenue on the Av malecon de la reserva. An observatory lounge is located on the 11th floor, with scenic views of the city. It is also a venue for conferences and wedding receptions. It was formerly known as the Orient-Express Hotel. In March 2014 Orient-Express Hotels was renamed Belmond, at which point the location changed its name to Belmond Miraflores Park.
