= Belmond Hotel Monasterio =

Hotel in Cuzco, Peru

Coordinates: 13.5154°S 71.9768°W

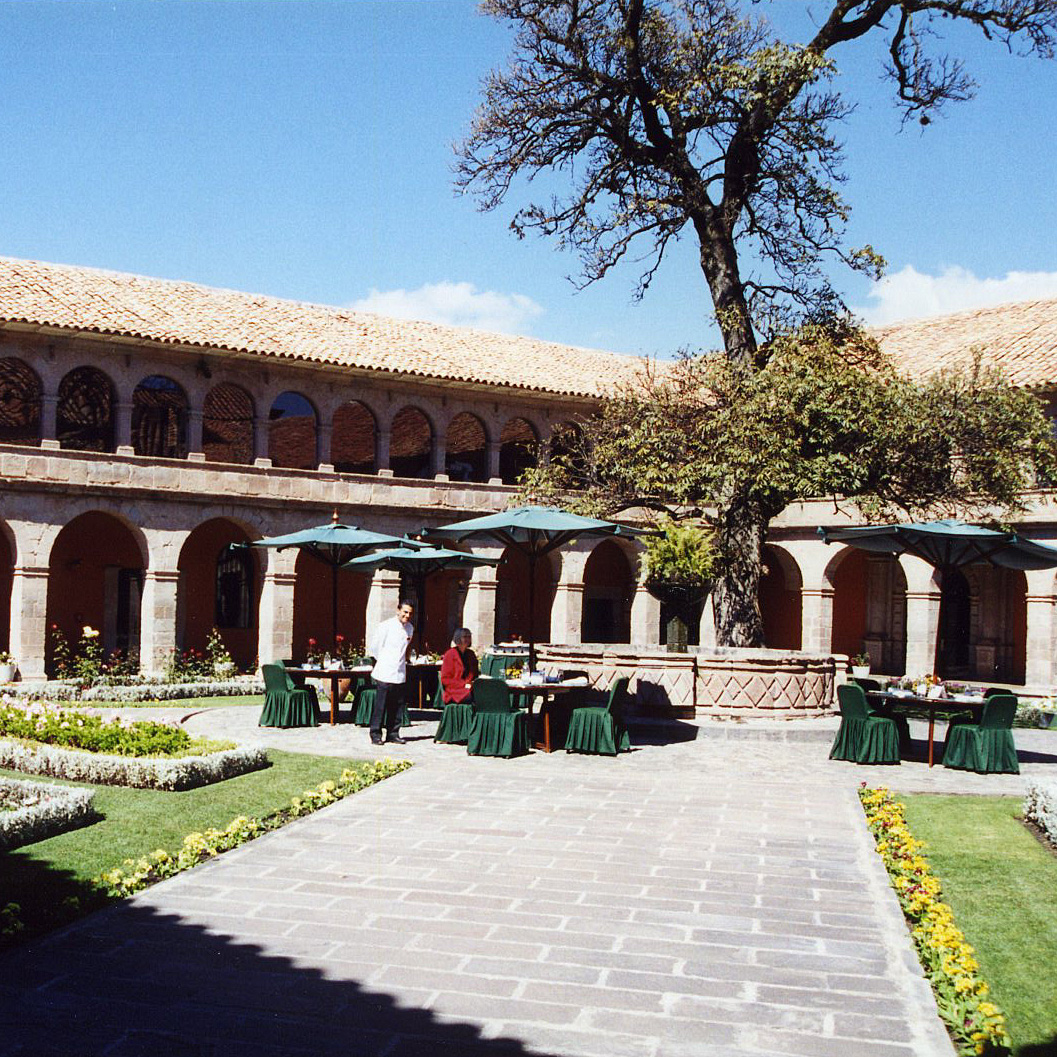

The Belmond Hotel Monasterio is a five-star hotel in Cusco, Peru. It is a refurbished Baroque seminary built in the 17th century on Inca foundations. The hotel is located two blocks from the Plaza de Armas, in the former premises of Saint Anthony the Abbot Seminary.

== History ==
=== Seminary ===
In keeping with the decrees of the Council of Trent regarding the training of the clergy, in 1598 Antonio de Raya y Navarrete, the Bishop of Cusco, founded Saint Anthony the Abbot Seminary and entrusted its administration to the Jesuits. Its purpose was to provide training to young men who wanted to serve the Church, especially the sons of impoverished conquistadores. It was built on the foundations of the palace of the Sapa Inca Túpac Amaru. A major earthquake struck and damaged the building in 1650. In the process of reconstruction, a Baroque-style chapel was built.

In the mid-20th century, the Jesuits obtained the financial support of Cardinal Richard Cushing, the Archbishop of Boston, for the building of a new seminary. The school moved to this new facility in 1965.

=== Hotel ===
At that point, the seminary buildings were acquired and remodeled into the hotel that it is now. The Hotel Monasterio is considered a historical landmark and is protected by Peru's National Institute of Culture. There are stones around the entrance doors that still have the original Spanish Arms Escutcheon. It also has a portrait of the 18th-century Bishop José Manuel de Sarricolea y Olea. The former chapel contains old paintings and gold plated frames. In the center of the hotel, there is a courtyard that holds a fountain and an old cedar tree that is 300 years old. The hotel includes Peruvian-style restaurants and a bar that include the following: El Tupay Restaurant, Illariy Restaurant, Deli Monasterio, and the Lobby Bar. It was inaugurated after extensive restoration by the Chairman of Peru Hotel, Peruvian entrepreneur Lorenzo Sousa, in 1995, considered the promoter and pioneer of luxury tourism in Cuzco, the Sacred Valley and Machu Picchu, as well as luxury train service thought southern Peru.

Hotel Monasterio is currently a 50/50 joint venture denominated Peru Orient Express Hotels SA, between Lorenzo Sousa and family, and Orient Express Hotels Ltd, and has won most of the awards in the industry for Peruvian Hotels during the last 15 years.

Hotel Monasterio was obtained by the Sousa group after the privatization process of Entur Peru during 1994 and it opened its doors in the CADE of 1995. Since then Hotel Monasterio has been remodeled two times to update its rooms and common areas, it was the first Hotel to include oxygen inside its rooms to decrease altitude sickness.

In 1999 Orient-Express Hotels Ltd. took over management of the hotel.

In 2014 Hotel Monasterio was renamed as Belmond Hotel Monasterio. This marked the change of the Orient-Express Hotels Ltd. name to Belmond Ltd.
