= Belmond Hotel Rio Sagrado =

- Interactive map of the Belmond Hotel Rio Sagrado area

General information
- Location: Peru Urubamba-Ollantaytambo, Valle Sagrado, Cusco, Peru
- Coordinates: 13.290475157754503°S 72.14489564331912°W
- Opening: April 2009
- Management: Belmond Ltd.

Other information
- Number of suites: 21

Website
- belmond.com/hotelriosagrado

Belmond Hotel Rio Sagrado is a hotel in the Sacred Valley of the Incas, 46 kilometres from Cusco, Peru. It is built on the banks of the Urubamba River by Urubamba, near the town of Ollantaytambo, which is known for its Inca archaeological site and as a starting point for one of the longer treks to Machu Picchu. The hotels features 11 suites, 10 rooms, and 2 villas. The hotel has extensive gardens constructed with streams reminiscent of Inca water channels.

The hotel opened in April 2009 and was acquired by Orient-Express Hotels in December of that year. It was the first hotel in the Sacred Valley with a solar heated swimming pool. In March 2014 the company changed its name to Belmond Ltd. At that time the hotel was renamed Belmond Hotel Rio Sagrado.

In 2020 The Belmond hotel chain announced the official reopening of two of its hotels: the Belmond Palacio Nazarenas and Belmond Hotel Rio Sagrado.
