= Belmond Limited =

Hotel and leisure company

Belmond Ltd.
- Formerly: Orient-Express Hotels Ltd.
- Type: Subsidiary
- Industry: Hospitality
- Founded: 1976; 50 years ago
- Headquarters: Hamilton, Bermuda
- Key people: Roeland Vos (chairman); Dan Ruff (CEO)
- Services: Hotels, trains, cruises, restaurants
- Revenue: US$ 576.84 million (2018)
- Parent: LVMH
- Website: www.belmond.com

Belmond Ltd. (formerly Orient-Express Hotels Ltd.) is a hospitality and leisure company that operates hotels, train services and river cruises and safaris worldwide. In 2024, the company has 47 properties in 28 countries and territories, with 32 hotels, six tourist trains, seven river cruise boats and two safaris.

== History ==
The company was founded in 1976 by American entrepreneur James Sherwood, who acquired the Hotel Cipriani in Venice, Italy, from the Guinness family for £900,000. Sherwood then bought a number of carriages from the defunct Orient Express, which he restored as the Venice Simplon-Orient-Express, which began offering rides in 1982 from Paris and London to his hotel in Venice.

On 10 March 2014, Orient-Express Hotels Ltd was renamed Belmond, and on 1 July 2014, Belmond's holding company was also renamed Belmond Ltd.

In April 2015, Belmond partnered with Irish Rail to launch the train Belmond Grand Hibernian in Ireland. In July 2016, Indian Hotels Company Limited sold most of its 5.1% stake in Belmond, retaining only 0.44% after the sale.

In December 2018, the company agreed to be acquired by LVMH in a $3.2 billion transaction which would delist the company from the New York Stock Exchange and make it 100% privately owned. The announcement of the sale led Belmond's share price to increase by 40% in a day. The deal closed in April 2019.

Belmond has continued to grow its portfolio in Italy. In September 2021, it acquired Villa Beatrice in Portofino. In February 2023, the company announced an agreement with Sardegna Resorts S.r.l to manage Romazzino in Sardinia.

It has also added a cluster of new properties in Mexico. In August 2023, Belmond re-opened Maroma following a redesign, in which 10 beachfront suites were added. In June 2023 it entered into an agreement with Cora Pacific Development to open Milaroca, a hotel on the Pacific Coast of Mexico, in 2025. In December 2023, the company announced that it had acquired Hacienda Katanchel in Mexico, with a planned opening in 2027.

In December 2022, Belmond announced a 10-year plan to upgrade its properties, which it had already begun with the renovation of Splendido Mare in 2021. Upgrades have included renovations and refurbishments to its trains. In October 2021, Belmond launched a train carriage designed by film director Wes Anderson on the British Pullman train. In 2023, the company also launched a Dior Spa on The Royal Scotsman.

In 2024, the company returned the Eastern & Oriental Express to service, after the train service was paused during the pandemic. The company launched a Dior Spa aboard, and unveiled a sleeper carriage for the Venice Simplon-Orient-Express, designed by French street artist JR. The carriage was also presented at the 2024 Venice Biennale.

== Properties ==
=== Hotels ===
Continent	Country	City or locality	Name
Europe	Italy	Portofino	Splendido; Splendido Mare; Villa Beatrice
Europe	Italy	Florence, Tuscany	Belmond Villa San Michele
Europe	Italy	Casole d'Elsa, Tuscany	Castello di Casole
Europe	Italy	Amalfi Coast	Caruso
Europe	Italy	Sicily	Belmond Villa Sant'Andrea
Europe	Italy	Sicily	Belmond Grand Hotel Timeo
Europe	Italy	Sardinia	Romazzino
Europe	Spain	Deia, Mallorca	Belmond La Residencia
Europe	Portugal	Madeira	Belmond Reid's Palace
Europe	United Kingdom	London	The Cadogan
Europe	United Kingdom	Oxfordshire	Le Manoir aux Quat'Saisons
North America
North America	French West Indies	St. Martin	Belmond La Samanna
North America	British West Indies	Anguilla	Belmond Cap Juluca
North America	Mexico	Riviera Maya	Belmond Maroma Resort & Spa
North America	Mexico	San Miguel de Allende	Casa de Sierra Nevada
South America	Brazil	Rio de Janeiro	Copacabana Palace
South America	Brazil	Iguaçu Falls	Belmond Hotel das Cataratas
South America	Peru	Lima	Belmond Miraflores Park
South America	Peru	Cusco	Belmond Palacio Nazarenas (Note: All Cusco and Macchu Picchu Hotels are a 50% Joint Venture with Peruvian shareholding company Peru Hotel Macchu Picchu SA (Peru Belmond Hotels SA))
South America	Peru	Cusco	Belmond Hotel Monasterio
South America	Peru	Machu Picchu	Belmond Sanctuary Lodge
South America	Peru	Sacred Valley	Belmond Hotel Rio Sagrado
South America	Peru	Colca Canyon	Belmond Las Casitas
Asia	Indonesia	Bali	Belmond Jimbaran Puri
Africa	South Africa	Cape Town	Belmond Mount Nelson Hotel
Africa	Botswana	Chobe National Park	Belmond Savute Elephant Lodge
Africa	Botswana	Okavango Delta	Eagle Island Lodge

==== Fromer Belmond hotels ====
- La Residence Angkor, a Belmond hotel
- The Westcliff hotel, Johannesburg ( former Orient Express hotel now Four Seasons)
- The Lapa palace hotel, Lisbon ( former Orient Express hotel now Olissippo)
- The Observatory, Sydney ( former Orient Express hotel now The Langham Sydney)
- Lilianfels, blue mountains New South Wales ( former Orient Express now Ardour)

=== Transportation ===
Type	Route	Name
Sleeper trains	London-Venice	Venice Simplon-Orient-Express
Sleeper trains	Scotland	Belmond Royal Scotsman
Sleeper trains	England - Wales	Britannic Explorer
Sleeper trains	Singapore, Malaysia, Thailand & Laos	Eastern & Oriental Express
Sleeper trains	Peru	Belmond Andean Explorer (Note: (since May 2017) In 50% partnership with the Peruvian shareholder company Peruvian Trains and Railways SA)
Day trains	Great Britain	Belmond British Pullman
Day trains	Peru (Note: Belmond has a 50% interest in PeruRail.)	Belmond Hiram Bingham
River Boats	France	Les Bateaux Belmond (seven canal and river barges)

==== Other formerly operated trains ====
- Great South Pacific Express (1999-2003) in Australia between Kuranda, Queensland and Sydney. Its carriages were transferred to the Belmond Andean Explorer after its demise.
- Belmond Northern Belle (2000-2017) in the Central and Northern regions of Great Britain. Sold to West Coast Railways as a new operator.
- Belmond Grand Hibernian (2016-2021) in Ireland. Its carriages were transferred to the Britannic Explorer.

=== Restaurants ===
Country	City	Name
United States	New York City	21 Club
United Kingdom	Oxfordshire	The Restaurant at Le Manoir aux Quat’Saisons
United Kingdom	London	The Lalee
Portugal	Madeira	William Restaurant
Italy	Venice	Oro Restaurant
Italy	Taormina	Otto Geleng Restaurant
Italy	Florence	La Loggia
Spain	Deia	El Olivo
Brazil	Rio de Janeiro	Mee
Brazil	Rio de Janeiro	Ristorante Hotel Cipriani
