= List of Israeli strikes and Palestinian casualties in the 2014 Gaza War =

This is a list of individual Israel Defense Forces (IDF)/Israeli Air Force (IAF) operations in Operation Protective Edge, which began on 8 July 2014, naming the targets and casualties.

In March 2015, according to UN OCHA, 2,220 Palestinians had been killed, of whom 1,492 civilians (551 children, 299 women), 605 militants and 123 of unknown status. The IDF calculates 2,127 killed claiming 55% were civilians and 45% militants. Israeli casualties consisted of 6 civilians (including 1 Thai national) and 66 soldiers, 5 of whom reportedly died from friendly fire. The Associated Press, examining 247 airstrikes that hit residential compounds, out of the some 5,000 Israeli bombing raids, determined that of the 844 killed, 60% or 508 were presumed civilian children (280, of whom 19 were babies and 108 preschoolers between the ages of 1 and 5), women and older men. 98 or 11% were confirmed or suspected Hamas militants. Israel's Intelligence and Terrorism Information Center (ITIC) has alleged that Hamas uses children in their operations in the Gaza Strip, and that some militants killed in action were "falsely reported" as civilians or children.

== Day 1: Monday night–Tuesday 8 July 2014 ==
By day's end Israel had struck 220 targets in Gaza and 24 people had died. 157 Gazan rockets were fired at Israel, with no casualties. A lull as Israel mulled the pros and cons of an invasion was broken when Mohammed Shaaban (24), senior commander of Hamas's military wing, was killed with two companions, Amjad Shabaan (30) and Khader al-Bashliqi (45), when his car was struck by an Israeli missile near Wehada Street in Gaza City.

- In a strike on Sheikh Radwan neighborhood in Gaza City, Ahmad Nael Mahdi (16) was killed, while two friends were wounded.
- In a strike at al-Qarara, north of Khan Younis, Suleiman Salman Abu al-Sawaween (age unclear) was killed, and another man critically injured.
- An airstrike targeted a tuk-tuk vehicle in the al-Shujaiyeh neighborhood in Gaza City, killing Ahmad Moussa Habib (16) and his cousin, Mohammad Habib (22).
- An airstrike targeted a motorcycle near Abraj al-Sheikh Zayed, Jabalia, killing Fakhri Saleh Ajjouri (aka Saqie Ayesh al-Jaouri; believed to be around 22 years of age).

Date	Place	Target	Description	Action	Origin of missile
8 July 2014, 15:00	Khan Younis	Odeh Ahmad Mohammad Kaware?	Hamas activist.	A missile launched by an IAF F-16 jet hit the al-Kaware (Kaware') family home. The target was a member of a family who was a Hamas activist. 8 people were killed, including 6 children. Another 28 people were wounded. It was the first of 59 incidents in which a family house was bombed. Initial accounts varied of the incident. The strike was preceded by a drone-fired warning flare, a "Knock on the roof" procedure, involving a small mortar shot or unarmed missile at the target. Relatives and neighbours gathered at the home to form a human shield, according to one source. Five families were evacuated after a warning missile was fired, but neighbours gathered on the roof to try and hinder the operation, In the past strikes were often aborted if civilians crowded rooftops. A third account indicated that neighbours had gathered after an initial strike to prevent a further one. The official assessment was that it was a "tragic mistake" based upon the belief that the home was empty. A B'tselem investigation determined that, the family was contacted by the Israeli military to leave the premises at 13:30, and they evacuated, gathering outside. At 14:50, a drone missile struck the solar water tank on the roof, and after several minutes, the family went back inside, four staying on the roof, while several were in a stairwell or courtyard when the 15:00 missile struck. After the incident, the IDF changed its initial explanation from targeting the homes of Hamas activists who carry out "high-trajectory fire towards Israel" to "homes of senior activists that function as command and control headquarters".: Siraj Iyad Abd al-Al (8), died later from injuries sustained); Bassem Salim Kaware (10); Hussein Yusef Kaware (13); Muhammad Ali Kaware (13); Abdallah Muhammad Kaware (12); Qassem Kaware (12); Amar Muhammad Judah (20); Ibrahim Kaware (29); Muhammad Ibrahim Kaware (50)	IAF

- An airstrike destroyed a house in central Gaza, and Rashad Yassin (27), from the al-Nuseirat refugee camp, was later found dead under the rubble.
- A missile strike on the Beit Hanoun home of Hamas military commander Raed al Atar killed al-Atar along with five other people.

Date	Place	Target	Description	Action	Origin of missile
8 July 2014, 23:40	Beit Hanoun	Abd al-Hafiz Hamad (30), believed to be responsible for attacks on Sderot.	Islamic Jihad	In a joint ISA-IDF operation, an airstrike hit a yard by Hafiz Hamad's home.(30), killing the target and five members of his family, and injuring two children. According to B'tselem, which has collected an eyewitness account by the grandfather, no warning was received. Four children survived unharmed after the mother placed them in the safest room, but the last was injured before it could be relocated and was taken to the ICU. It was the 2nd in 59 incidents in which whole families were bombed.: Dunia/Dinah Mahdi Hamad (16) (granddaughter); Mahdi Muhammad Hamad (46) (son); Fawziya Khalil Hamad (62) (mother); Abd al-Hafez Hamad (30) (son); Suha Hamad (wife of Hafez) (25) (daughter-in-law); Ibrahim Muhammad Hamad (26)(son)	IAF

- Abdul Halim al-Eshra (55) was killed on his farm in Deir al-Balah; a civil defense crew discovered the body four days later.

== Day 2: Wednesday 9 July 2014 ==
By day's end, Israel had struck 326 targets in Gaza, resulting in eight deaths, according to the New York Times. Gaza launched 130 rockets towards Israel, with no casualties, bringing the death toll to 61 later that day. Casualties were estimated to range from 300–450. 6 women and 9 children figured among the 22 dead. The IAF struck some 160 targets overnight, and totalled 430 strikes in two days, including 120 concealed rocket launchers, tunnels and 10 Hamas command and control centres. 82 Gaza rockets were fired at Israel, 21 of which were intercepted.

- An airstrike on Rafah's al-Shouka neighborhood killed a militant, AbdulHadi Juma al-Soufi (24).
- At dawn, an Israeli drone missile struck Rafiq al-Kafarne (30) while he rode a motorcycle at Beit Lahiya, and severely wounded another man.
- At 10:20, an IAF missile struck an agricultural plot in al-Mughraqa village, killing an elderly woman, Naifa Mohammed Zaher Farajallah (82), who had been either passing by or was buried under the rubble of her home.
- At 10:30, a drone missile killed two people in a field near their home in the al-Nussairat refugee camp: Abdul Nasser Saleem Abu Kwaik (54 or 60) and his son Khaled (30 or 31) were killed. Abu Kwaik's wife and daughter were wounded.
- An Israeli airstrike killed Muhammad Khalid al-Nimrah (22) in the Sabra neighborhood of Gaza City.
- At 11:30, an IAF missile hit Mustafa Jamal Malaka's house southeast of Gaza City, killing Hana Mohammed Fu'ad Malaka (28) and her child, Mohammed Mustafa Malaka (2), and wounding three other family members.
- 11:55 an IAF missile struck several people near their home in Beit Hanoun, killing four people: Sahar Hassan al-Masri (aged 35 or 40), Mohammed Ibrahim al-Masri (14 or 15), Aseel (16), and Amjad Zaher Hamdan (23 or 24) a nephew, who allegedly was a member of Islamic Jihad.
- At 12:10, an IAF missile struck civilians in al-Nazzaz Street, al-Shuja'iya, Gaza City, killing two children, Eyad Salem Oraif (12), and his brother, Mohammed (10).
- At 12:40, a mother, Amal Youseg Abdul Ghafour (al-Abadla; aged 33) and her son, Ranin (1), died in an IAF strike on a house opposite their own in al-Qarara.
- At 14:10, an IAF missile struck an open are near Bahloul gas station, east of Gaza City, killing a man described as a passer-by, Hatem Mohammed Sa'id Abu Salem (26).
- At 18:55 an IAF missile hit a farm in Zimmu Street, Beit Hanoun, killing three civilians: Hani Saleh Hamad (58), his son, Ibrahim (19), and his daughter, Asmaa (26).
- At 15:00, the IAF bombed Awadh Hussein al-Nawasra's 2-storey house in al-Maghazi refugee camp, killing Aesha Shubib (Sumud) al-Nawasra (23; four months pregnant); her husband, Salah Awadh al-Nawasra (24); and their children, Mohammed Khalaf Awadh al-Nawasra (2) and Nidal Khalaf Awadh al-Nawasra (4), as well as Ra'ed Mohammed Abu Shalat (35), whose wife and five children were wounded.
- At 20:15, an IAF strike bombed an agricultural plot in Gaza Old Street, damaging Mohammed Yousef al-Mautawaq's house and killing his daughter, Yasmin (3).
- At 20:20, an IAF strike in the Rafah area killed Miriam Atiya al-Arja (9) and Silmiya Hassan al-Arja (60), adjacent to a targeted field near their home.
- At 21:15, an IAF missile struck Jameel Abu Ghazal's house at an agricultural plot of the Murtaja family, east of Quliabu Hill; his son, Abdullah (4) was killed and another son, Mohammed (7), was seriously wounded.
- At 22:35, a driver for the Gaza news agency Media 24, Hamed Abdullah Mohammed Shihab (33), was killed when an IAF missile struck his car marked with “TV”, in al-Remal, Gaza City; three civilians were wounded.
- At 23:00 An Israeli airstrike hit the Waqt al-Marah (Fun Time Beach Cafe) coffee bar on the seafront in Khan Younis, killing nine and wounding another 10 people reportedly watching the Netherlands-Argentina match in a 2014 FIFA World Cup semi-final, which they could not see in Khan Younis because due to a power outage. Among the victims, mostly in their twenties, were: Muhammad Qannan (26) and Ibrahim Qannan (24), brothers; Suleiman al-Astal (17), Ahmed Saleem Mousa al-Astal (18) and Mousa Mohammed Taher al-Astal (15), brothers; Hamdi (20), Ibrahim (28) and Saleem Sawali (23), brothers; and Mohammed Ihsan Farawana (18).
- At 23:40, an IAF missile struck Ra'ed Mohammed Abu Shalat's house in the al-Sawarha area west of al-Nussairat refugee camp. Variously reported as occurring (with different casualty figures) at az-Zawayda village, west of the Maghazi refugee camp.
- Aminah Malaka (27), her son Muhammad Malaka (18 months old), and Hatim Abu Salim (28) were killed in an Israeli airstrike on a house in al-Zeytoun, Gaza City. Mustafa Malaka, a Hamas security officer, was blown away yards from his house, but survived.
- Two brothers, Muhammad Arif (13) and Amir Arif (12), were killed in an air strike east of Gaza City,
- In an air strike, Rafah Samia al-Arja (65) was killed; eight others were injured.

According to the Palestinian Centre for Human Rights statistics, between 10 am Wednesday and 10 am Thursday, 9–10 July, the casualties consisted of 47 Palestinians, of whom 43 were adjudged to be civilians, and, of the latter category, 16 were children and 10 women. 214 Palestinians were wounded and 41 houses destroyed.

== Day 3: Thursday 10 July 2014 ==
By day's end, Israel struck 201 targets In Gaza, resulting in 23 deaths. Gaza fired 197 rockets towards Israel, with no fatalities. The homes of more than 40 Hamas commanders were targeted, bringing the total for three days to 785 strikes. 31 Palestinians were killed, bringing the overnight death count to 82. The dead included at least 10 women and 18 children, according to a count based on medical reports. By nightfall, at least 350 rockets had been fired at Israel, 90% of which were intercepted, while the IAF had made almost 900 airstrikes.

- At 02:00, 3 IAF missiles targeted a site in the Central Gaza Strip where militants were known to be active. Ra'ed Olayan al-Zawaw'a (27) was killed by shrapnel to the head.
- At 02:00 IAF warplanes targeted a house in the Khan Yunis refugee camp reportedly killing eight members of the al-Hajj family. Roughly 30 people in the vicinity were injured. Palestininian sources claimed that no Israeli warning was given before the strike. Those killed were: Mahmoud Lutfi al-Hajj (57); his wife, Bassema Abdul Qader Mohammed al-Hajj (48 or 57) and 6 of their children, Omar (20), Sa'ad (17), Tariq (18), Asmaa (22), Najlaa (29) and Fatema (12).
- At 07:30, IAF targeted three members of the al-Quds Brigades in al-Nafaq Street, Gaza City, killing Baha Mohammed Zakaria Abu al-Lail (35 or 38), Aamer Sa'id Salama al-Fayoumi (39) and Salem Hassan Qandil (31); four other people were injured.
- At 10:50, an artillery shell hit fencing on Hamad Hassan Abu Jame's house roof in Khan Yunis; Hassan Eid Abu Jame (60) and his son, Ismail (18), were killed while unloading goods from a motor cart. Two teenage members of the family were wounded.
- At 12:15, a drone missile struck a car with a militant, Mahmoud Talee Waloud (21), and two (2) civilians, Hazem Ibrahim Ba'lousha (33) and Odai Rafiq al-Sultan (21), in the vicinity of the Civil Defense headquarters in Jabaliya, killing all three.
- At 15:00, 2 drone missiles targeted 2 motorbikes in the al-Zaytoun neighborhood, southeast of Gaza City, killing a militant, Sami Adnan Shaldan (25), and wounding two other people.
- At 18:30, a drone missile struck Bassam Khatab's house in al-Hakar, Deir al-Balah, severing the knees of Khatab's son, Abdul Rahman Bassam (5), who died shortly afterwards. The missile was fired as father and son were feeding sheep in a pen outside, waiting for the muezzin's call to break the Ramadan fast.
- At 20:00, a drone missile fired at a man riding a motorbike in Deir al-Balah's al-Nakheel Street killed a militant, Abdullah Mustafa Abu Mahrouq (22).
- A girl, Yasmin Muhammad al-Mutawwaq (4), died of her wounds after an Israeli missile struck a site in Khan Younis.
- Abdullah Ramadan Abu Ghazal (5) was killed in a missile strike at Beit Lahiya.
- IDF soldiers were injured by mortar shrapnel; one suffered serious injuries requiring surgical treatments.

== Day 4: Friday 11 July 2014 ==
By day's end, Israel struck 235 targets in Gaza, resulting in 23 deaths. 137 rockets were fired from Gaza without causing fatalities.

By dawn, Israel radio reported the death total for Palestinians to be 92. An elderly Israeli woman died of a heart attack while rushing to a shelter during a siren alert in Haifa. Palestinian sources stated at around midday that 11 people had been killed since midnight, bringing the number of Palestinian deaths to 100. As of that hour Gazan rocket salvos had caused no Israeli fatalities, although a strike on a petrol station in Ashdod hit a fuel tanker and injured between three and eight Israelis, one seriously. Israeli strikes on Gazan targets passed 1,000.

- At 04:35, an IAF missile strike on tunnels in the Sha'ath neighborhood of Rafah hit collaterally the al-Nidji family in their home; daughter Nour Marwan al-Nijdi (10) died from shrapnel wounds. Her brother, Abdul Rahman (15) and their mother, Salwa Ahmed al-Nijdi (49), were wounded.
- At 10:30, Sofian Ahmed al-Bal'awi (39) died from wounds sustained in an IAF missile strike that hit a garden plot near his house.
- Anas Abu al-Kass (33), whose parents had apparently been killed due to a targeting error in Operation Cast Lead, was killed when a missile strike, reportedly aimed at a Hamas institution in the building, struck his 5th story clinic instead in the Tel al-Hawa neighbourhood in Gaza City.
- An Israeli airstrike, consisting of three missiles, targeting the Ghannam family home in Rafah blew it apart and damaged several other properties. Five family members were killed; one, Hussan (20), survived the injuries he sustained. Seven neighbours were injured. One member of the family was an Islamic Jihad member. The dead were: Abdul Raziq Hassan al-Ghannam (58), Ghalia Deeb al-Ghannam (57), Kifah Shaker al-Ghannam (33), Wissam Abdulraziq Hassan Ghannam (31), and Mahmoud Abdul Raziq al-Ghannam (28).
- An airstrike in the vicinity of the al-Nuseirat refugee camp killed Adnan al-Ashhab (40).
- A Gaza city airstrike killed a man described by Palestinian sources as a doctor and/or pharmacist.
- At 12:00, Mazen Mustafa Aslan (51) and Sharayan Ismail Abu al-Kas (41) were killed while driving in the al-Boreij municipality was struck by a drone missile. Local sources identified them as Hamas municipality employees. Three local residents were injured, and one, Shahad Helmi al-Qurainawi (a 5-year old girl), died shortly afterwards in hospital.
- At 12:20, an IAF warplane missile hit and heavily damaged Shadi al-Arini's flat in Beit Lahiya; five people were wounded.
- At 14:05, Mohammed Rabee Abu Hmaidan (64) was killed, and three (3) others wounded when a drone missile targeted an area near Hammouda gas station, outside Beit Hanoun.
- At 16:45, IAF warplanes targeting a militants' site near the Dar al-Salam Mosque in the al-Zeitoun neighborhood fired a missile that wounded eight people leaving the mosque, reportedly civilians, one of whom, Nasser Mohammed Esmamiya (49), died several hours later.
- At around 17:00, Saher Abu Namous (3 or 4 years old) died when a drone missile flying outside their homes, reportedly targeting a home in Jabaliya, killed him.
- At 19:45, Mohammed Saber Mustafa Sukkar (72 or 80) and Hussein Mohammed al-Mamlouk (49) died when an IAF missile was fired, together with shelling, on an area where several Palestinians, reportedly, civilians were on their way to a mosque in the al-Nizar neighborhood of Shuja'iyya, east Gaza City. A third man, Fadi Ya'qoub Sukkar (25), sustained severe wounds, and died an hour later. Three others suffered injuries.
- At 22:20, Rami Saleh Mohammed Abu Musa'ed (26) and Mohammed Ahmed al-Suamairi (24), both militants, died when a drone missile struck them in a field in Deir al-Balah.
- At 22:00, an IAF bombing demolished Yousef Mohammed al-Baik's 2-storey house in al-Nafaq Street, Gaza City, and artillery shells destroyed Sa'id Salem Abdul Aal's home; two civilians were wounded.
- Raed Abu Hani (50) died in an airstrike on eastern Rafah.
- An 80-year-old woman in Be'er Sheva suffered moderate injuries from a Gazan rocket late in the evening, and two other Israelis were injured.
- Two IDF soldiers were lightly injured by an anti-tank missile that damaged their jeep.
- In Israel's southern region 78 people have sought hospital care since the beginning of Operation Protective Cliff, 21 for shock, and 57 from minor injuries sustained en route to bomb shelters.

As the death count edged over the 100 figure, the United Nations Office for the Coordination of Humanitarian Affairs issued a calculation 20%, 21 of 101, of the fatalities so far were children, 11 women, and 58 civilians. It added that the number of injured exceeded 700. Israel had struck over 1,000 targets with over 2,000 tons/tonnes of explosives, several health facilities had been damaged, 70 homes had been completely destroyed, 342 housing units destroyed or damaged, and some 2,000 people were believed to have been displaced.

== Day 5: Saturday 12 July 2014 ==
By day's end, Israel had struck 180 targets In Gaza 180 targets, resulting in 51 deaths. Gazan militants fired 125 rockets towards Israel, with no fatalities.

- At 01:20, after his wife was phoned with a warning, two drone missiles struck the house of a member of the Izz ad-Din al-Qassam Brigades, Ghaleb Kamel Mansour, in al-Junaina, Rafah; a follow-up IAF strike destroyed the house.
- At 01:30, a strike on al-Nasr Street killed Yousif and Anas Qandil, father and son, who reportedly had fled their home, hoping to avoid collateral damage from shrapnel when their neighbours received an Israeli warning of an imminent strike on a nearby house. With others, they took shelter under a tree, where they were killed.
- At 01:35 (var. 00:35), a drone missile hit a site, described variously as either the yard of Anwar Aziz Mosque or Martyr Anwar Aziz Square in Jabaliya, killing four people: Hissab Deeb Razaina (39), Abdul Rahman Saleh al-Khatib (38), Yousef Mohammed Mandil (39), and Mohammed Edris Abu Swailem, as well as wounding five others.
- At 01:45, an IAF strike destroyed Mohammed and Shawqi Afana's 2-storey house, with collateral damage to a nearby home; seven civilians wounded.
- At 2:15 a.m, an IAF airstrike demolished the al-Farouq Mosque in Nuseirat refugee camp.
- At 04:55 (or about 04:30, coinciding with the muezzin's prayer): warning missiles, not heard by the hostel patients, were fired, but the disabled had no means to evacuate in time. Two mentally and physically disabled women, Ola Washahi (aka Ola Hussein Enshassi; aged 30 or 31) and Suha Musbah Abu Sa'da (aged 39 or 47) were killed, while several other people sustained injuries when the IAF struck a charitable care home for the handicapped in Beit Lahiya. A caregiver was hospitalized for burns.
- At 05:05, an IAF strike demolished a Wassef Charity office in al-Maghazi.
- At 05:30, 3 drone-launched missiles partially destroyed Ahmed Ezzat Abu Ahmed's 2-storey in Rafah's al-Shaboura refugee camp, wounding Mohammed al-Houbi (12).
- At 05:45, an IAF missile destroyed the Rafah office of the Ministry of Labor.
- At 06:45, an IAF airstrike struck militants belonging to the al-Mujahidin Brigades near the al-Katiba Mosque in Ansar, Gaza City, killing three: Mohammed Rif'at al-Syouti (20), Mohammed Bassem al-Halabi (25) and Nabil As'ad Bassal (29).
- At 07:10, an IAF airstrike killed three police officers in a park in al-Tuffah: Ibrahim Nabil Hamada (22), Hassan Ahmed Abu Ghoush (28), and Ahmed Mahmoud al-Bal'awi (23).
- At 07:30, 2 drone-launched missiles hit the home of Islamic Jihadist Mohammed Jamal Timraz, in the Tel al-Sultan refugee camp, west of Rafah. A neighbour was phoned to evacuate the house beforehand. Shortly thereafter, an IAF missile destroyed it.
- At 13:00, Al-Shifa Hospital staff in Gaza City announced the death of Safaa Mustafa Malaka (16), who had been wounded on 9 July in an attack on the family home in al-Zaytoun.
- At 13:40, an IAF missile struck a site where several civilians reportedly seated under the al-Malash family apartment building in the Sheikh Radwan neighborhood of Gaza City, killing six people: Nidal Mohammed Ibrahim al-Malash (22), Azmi Mahmoud Taha Obaid (51), Suleiman Sa'id Younis Obaid (56), Mustafa Mohammed Taha Enaya (58), Ghassaan Ahmed al-Masri (25), and Rateb Subhi Yousef al-Saifi (22).
- At 15:30, 2 drone-launched missiles hit No'man Wa'el al-Nahhal's house in Rafah's western al-Mawasi area, wounding his wife, Samar Fat'hi al-Nahhal (36); five minutes later, an IAF missile demolished the house.
- At 16:30, an IAF missile was fired at a group of militants at the Doula intersection in al-Zaytoun, Gaza City, killing Ahmed Yousef Dalloul (37) and wounding three people.
- At 17:30, an IAF bombing of a garden plot in al-Nazzaz Street in al-Shuja'iya neighborhood killed Ghazi Mohammed Mustafa Oraif (62) and his son, Mohammed (35), while they were reportedly tilling the earth.
- At 17:30, a drone missile struck Jum'a Saber Khalifa's 3-storey house, where 29 people resided, in the al-Nussairat refugee camp, followed shortly after by an IAF missile strike, killing a neighbor, Khawla Mohmmed Sarhan al-Hawajri (aged 25).
- At 17:30 (19:30?), a drone-launched missile damaged the office of the Deir Yassin Cultural Association in al-Tannour, east of Rafah.
- At 18:10, a drone missile fired at a group of militants, killing one person, Mohammed Abdullah Mohammed al-Sharatha (28), and wounding another east of Jabaliya.
- At 19:30, a drone-launched missile struck the 2-storey house of Mohammed al-Bawab, an Izz ad-Din al-Qassam Brigades operative, south of Rafah; an IAF strike demolished it 10 minutes later.
- At 22:25, a drone-launched missile targeted two members of the al-Quds Brigades in the al-Zohour neighborhood north of Rafah, killing Muhannad Yousef Dubahir (21) and mortally wounding Izziddin Na'im Bulbul (27), who died in hospital three hours later.

Date	Place	Target	Description	Action	Origin of missile

- At 22:30, in al-Tuffah, 2 IAF missiles, following a Hamas barrage of missiles towards Israeli cities, targeted the head of Gaza's Hamas police, Gen. Tayseer al-Batsh. Initial accounts vary: either he was targeted as he was leaving a mosque in al-Tuffah, Gaza City, or the house where he was sheltering was hit by two bombs. In the latter case, he was injured while taking shelter in the house of his cousin, Majid al-Batsh, and the bombs demolished the house, and killed 21 or 22 members of the family inside. The attack killed 21 or 22 people and wounded between 35 and 45 people, including the general. It marked the single deadliest assault since the outbreak of hostilities. Ynet reported that the mosque was the primary target, that several militants, some intending to launch rockets, were among the 21 dead, and that the IDF "does not view the incident as a work accident". The attack, reportedly without prior warning struck Majed Subhi al-Batsh's 2-storey house, home to two families, close by the al-Haramain Mosque in al-Tuffah, killing 11 family members:
  - Majed Subhi al-Batsh (50),
  - Bahaa Maj al-Batsh (28) his son,
  - Amal Hassan Mohammed al-Batsh (49), his wife,
  - Samah Alaa Subhi al-Batta (20), eight-months pregnant, daughter-in-law,
  - Amal Bahaa al-Batsh (2), his grandchild,
  - Jalal Majed al-Batsh (26), his son,
  - Khaled Majed al-Batsh (20), his son,
  - Mahmoud Majed al-Batsh (22), his son,
  - Ibrahim Majed al-Batsh (18), his son,
  - Marwa (25), his daughter,
  - Manar Majed al-Batsh (13), his child.
- Several nearby houses owned by Majed al-Batsh's brothers suffered considerable damage; the following were killed: Nahid Na'im Subhi al-Batsh (41), Qusai Issam Subhi al-Batsh (12), Mohammed Issam al-Batsh 17), Aziza Yousef Ahmed al-Batsh (59), Yihya Alaa Subhi al-Batsh (18), and Anas Alaa Subhi al-Batsh (7).
  15 other al-Batsh family members were wounded, 6 seriously.
- At 23:05, a drone-launched missile struck a vehicle belonging to the Coastal Municipalities Water Utility, in Abu Bakr Street, western Rafah, seriously wounding Ziad Mahmoud al-Shawi (42).
- At 23:40, a drone-launched missile successfully targeted a member of the al-Quds Brigades, Emad Bassam Zo'rob (23), in al-Siamat Street, northern Rafah. Two people who came to his assistance were struck by another missile, killing one, Fadi Mohammed Zo'rob (23), instantly. The other, Haitham Ashraf Zo'rob (20), died five hours later in hospital.

B'tselem estimated by noon on Saturday, 12 July, that of the 114 Palestinians killed, 27 had been killed while engaged in combat. Of the remainder, 26 were minors, 13 were women (under age 60) and 5 were senior citizens. From 10 a.m. Saturday to 10 a.m. Sunday, Palestinian sources stated that 43 people, including 39 civilians, while 139 were wounded. 23 houses were demolished in air attacks.

== Day 6: Sunday 13 July 2014 ==
By the end of day 5 (12 July), Israeli forces had struck 173 targets in Gaza, resulting in 13 deaths. Gaza had fired 130 rockets towards Israel, with no fatalities. By early Sunday morning, according to Gaza's Ministry of Health, the death toll and casualty figures in the Gaza Strip had risen to 165 Palestinians killed with over 1,000 injured. On 13 July, an Israeli spokesman said Israel had so far launched over 1,300 air strikes, while Hamas had launched some 800 rockets towards Israeli. Several Israelis have been wounded. Israel dropped leaflets warning around 100,000 Gazan residents of Beit Latiya and Attatra to evacuate the area, where Israel proposes to "strike with might" late Sunday. Most residents appeared to have decided to stay, although by late Sunday 17,000 had packed up and left.

- At 12:00, a drone missile targeted a group of militants, killing one man, Qassem Talal Hamdan (24).
- At 12:15, a drone-launched missile damaged Khamis Abdul Wahab al-Salhi's 3-storey house in the al-Nussairat refugee camp, and three people, reportedly civilians, were wounded.
- At 17:00, a drone-launched missile struck the house of al-Quds Brigades member Ra'fat Saleh al-Zamli, after a warning phone-call to his brother, in the al-Salam neighborhood, southern Rafah; five minutes later an IAF missile destroyed the property.
- At 17:40, a drone-fired missile struck the house of Izz ad-Din al-Qassam Brigades leader Faisal Ahmed al-Qadhi, home to nine people, opposite the Rab'a al-Adawiya School in the west of Rafah, and it was destroyed by a follow-up strike. Prior to the attack the IDF had phoned al-Qadhi's sister-in-law telling her to evacuate the house.
- At 21:20, a drone-launched missile struck Al-Nasser Salah al-Deen Brigades's member Ussama Thabet Abu Mour's house in al-Nasser village, northeast of Rafah, killing one member of the brigade, Maher Thabet Abu Mour (23).
- At 21:55, a drone-launched missile struck the garden of a house rented by Hazem Mousa Abu Mo'ammar in al-Nasser village, northeast of Rafah, killing three people: Abu Mo'ammar's father (56),; his brother, Saddam (24), and his sister-in-law, Hanadi Hamdan Abu Mo'ammar (26). Three others were injured.
- At 22:20, an IAF warplane launched a missile at an agricultural plot in Wadi as-Salqa village, east of Deir al-Balah either killing or injuring the owner, Mohammed Salem Brais (79).
- At 23:35, 3 drone-launched missiles hit Basheer al-Tabatibi's 2-storey house east of Jabaliya; it was destroyed shortly afterwards by an IAF strike.

== Day 7: Monday 14 July 2014 ==
By day's end, Israel had struck 163 targets in Gaza, resulting in six deaths. Gazan militants had fired 115 rockets towards Israel, resulting in no fatalities. As the strike entered its seventh day, Palestinian fatalities had risen to 172 dead, with an estimated 1,230 wounded, as two (2) more men were killed in night strikes, and more than 60 Palestinians suffered injuries. According to calculations by the Palestinian Centre for Human Rights, 130 of the dead (among them 35 children and 26 women) were civilians. The Al-Noor Mosque in Deir al-Balah was demolished in a bombing sortie. According to the Israeli Human Rights NGO, B'tselem, by 13 July, of 52 Palestinians killed in 10 distinct strikes on homes, 19 were minors and 12 were women. The assessment excludes figures from another incident, in which six family members died in an operation the IDF defined as a targeted killing.

- At 00:45, Adham Mohammed Abdul Fattah Abdul Aal (29) died of wounds sustained in an earlier IAF attack on his family's house.
- At 03:30, 2 drone-launched missiles struck Jamal Hassouna Shamallakh's 3-storey house, home to 17 people live, in the Sheikh Ejlin neighborhood southwest of Gaza City, and a follow-up IAF strike destroyed it, wounding three children.
- At 03:30, 2 drone-launched missiles struck Matar Mohammed Abduat's 3-storey house, home to 10 people, and a follow-up IAF strike destroyed it, leaving five children wounded.
- At 05:00, a drone-launched missile, after an IDF alert to a neighbour to evacuate the house, partially destroyed the house of an Izz ad-Din al-Qassam Brigades activist, Suleiman Mohammed Abu Sha'ar, near the al-Farouq Mosque at al-Shaboura.
- Adham Muhammad Abdul-Fattah al-Abdul died of his wounds in Gaza City.
- Hanadi Hamdi Muammar (27) was killed in Israeli airstrikes on Khan Younis.
- Hmeid Suleiman Abu al-Araj (60) was killed in an airstrike on Deir al-Balah.
- Three people killed in Khan Younis by an Israeli airstrike: Abdullah Baraka, Abasan al-Jadida, and Tamir Salim Qudeih (37).
- Mohammad Taysir Hamdan (24) was killed in an airstrike.
- Ziyad Salim al-Shawi (25) died of wounds received in an earlier attack.
- Ziyad al-Najjar (16) died when his motorbike was targeted by an airstrike in Khan Younis.

== Day 8: Tuesday 15 July 2014 ==
By day's end, Israel had struck 96 targets in Gaza, resulting in 16 deaths. Gazan militants fired 156 rockets towards Israel, resulting in 1 death. In the 8 days since the outbreak of hostilities, Israel had struck 1,603 targets in Gaza, resulting in 194 deaths. Gaza launched 1147 rockets, resulting in one death in Israel.

By early Tuesday morning, the Ma'an News Agency reported that casualties rose overnight to 192 fatalities, and over 1,400 injured.

- At 15:00, an IAF strike hit a shed on an agricultural plot northwest of Khan Yunis, destroying it, killing Subhi Abdul Hamid Hussein Mousa (78).
- At 18:30, an IAF missile critically wounded Ismail Fatouh (24), who had reportedly been irrigating crops on his plot of land in Zeitoun, Gaza; he died later in a hospital.
- At 22:10, a drone-launched missile killed a militant, Khalil Ibrahim al-Sha'afi (41), who was en route to a mosque in the village of Juhor ad-Dik.
- At 22:50 a drone-launched missile hit a taxi with six (6) passengers in al-Junaina, Rafah, killing two and wounding four, one of whom, the taxi driver, died four hours later. The dead were: Mousa Sa'id Dahliz (30), Yasser Ali al-Mahmoum (18), and taxi driver Ahmed Aadel al-Nawajha (23).
- Ismail Salim al-Najjar (46) and Muhammad Ahmad Ibrahim al-Najjar (49) were killed in an airstrike near former Israeli settlements which had been evacuated in 2005.
- An airstrike in Khan Younis killed three people: Suleiman Abu Luli (33), Ata al-Umour (58), and Bushra Khalil Zurub (53).
- The home of Basim Naim, adviser to Hamas leader Ismail Haniyeh, was destroyed in an airstrike.

== Day 9: Wednesday 16 July 2014 ==
By day's end, Israel had struck 50 targets in Gaza, resulting in 17 deaths. Gaza had fired 94 rockets towards Israel, resulting in no fatalities.

- At 00:20 IAF warplanes destroyed the 4-storey house of a member of the Palestinian Legislative Council, Ismail al-Ashqar, in Jabaliya.
- At 01:00, a drone-launched missile struck the vicinity of Asqalan School in the al-Fakhari area southeast of Khan Yunis, killing Fareed Mahmoud Abu Daqqa (33).
- At 01:40, a drone-launched missile at the 5-storey house of former Interior Minister Fathi Hammad in Beit Lahiya.
- At 02:20 a drone-launched missile struck and killed two militants, Mohammed Abdullah al-Zahouq (25) and Mohammed Ismail Abu Ouda (28), in Swedish Village, southwest of Rafah, and injured a third.
- At 02:35, a drone-launched missile killed Mohammed Sabri al-Dibari (21) near his home in al-Shouka, southeast of Rafah.
- At 03:00, a drone-launched missile killed a man, Mohammed Tayseer Yousef Shurrab (23), returning home to Gizan Abu Rashwan, southeast of Khan Yunis.
- At 03:10, a drone-launched missile struck Mohammed Abdullah Salam al-Arjani's house, home to 20 people, in the Gizan Abu Rashwan area, reportedly without prior warning, killing al-Arjani's son, Abdullah (19), and wounding six others.
- At 06:40, a drone-launched missile killed a man, Ashraf Fares Abu Shanab (26), working his land east of Rafah.
- In Gaza City, four children were killed by Israeli rockets while playing soccer just outside the Al Deira Hotel. Staff from the hotel brought wounded to the restaurant. Several foreign journalists staying at the hotel became eyewitnesses to the killing.

== Day 10: Thursday 17 July 2014 ==
- On Thursday morning, IAF warplanes bombed the residence of the French Consul in Gaza, Dr. Majdi Jameel Shaqqura, his two-storey home near al-Nawras Resort, southwest of Beit Lahiya, was demolished.
- At 17:10, a drone-launched missile hit the roof of Marzouq Mohammed Shuhaiber's son's home, where five children were reportedly feeding birds, killing three, and seriously wounding the other two. The dead were: Wissam Essam Marzouq Shuhaiber (8) and Afnan Wissam Marzouq Shuhaiber (8), and a third child whose surname was not released, Jihad (10).
- At 18:00, IAF warplanes dropped flyers warning the inhabitants of Khuza'a, Abassan and Bani Suheila to abandon their homes and concentrate in the town centre.
- At 18:15, a drone-launched missile struck the al-Abadla family home in al-Qarara, killing a militant, Hamza Hassan Ali al-Abadla (29).
- At 18:20, a drone-launched missile struck two children in their backyard, al-Manara neighborhood, south of Khan Yunis, killing one person, Rahaf Khalil Hamada al-Jbour (4), and wounding another.
- At 18:55, an Israeli drone fired a missile at a house belonging to Ussama Abu Taha in the Al-Brazil neighborhood, south of Rafah. A few minutes later, an Israeli warplane launched a missile at the house and destroyed it; Mukhles Jaber al-Loulahi (aged 4) was wounded.
- At 19:00, Hayel Abdul Hamid School was shelled in Beit Hanoun, fire burned the third floor and the site was damaged.
- At 19:20, after a phone alert to the owner's son, a drone missile struck Salem Shihda Siam's house, home to 10 people, in Rafah's al-Shaboura refugee camp; it was demolished minutes later by an IAF missile.
- At 19:50, a drone-launched missile struck Musallam Abdul Karim Eissa's house, home to 20 people, in Juhor ad-Dik; minutes later an IAF missile destroyed it, killing Eissa's son, Hussam, and seriously injuring one of Eissa's brothers.
- At 20:00, Israeli tanks fired dozens of shells at the east of the central Gaza Strip. A number of civilians were wounded and some houses were damaged.
- At 20:00, six people were wounded when Israeli tank fire shelled Khan Yunis.
- At 20:40, Israeli tank fire laid a barrage down on the al-Sha'af neighborhood, east of Gaza City, striking Abed Ali Abdul Aal Entaiz's house, killing three family members and wounding four others. The dead were: Abed Ali Abdul Aal Entaiz (24), Mohammed Ibrahim Entaiz (13), and Mohammed Salem Ibrahim Entaiz (2).
- At 20:45 the house of the Antez family, home to around 60 people from three families, in Sha'af was shelled, killing a father and son, Abed Ali (24) and Mohammad (2), as well as another adult, Mohammad Ibrahim (13).
- At 22:00, Yousef Ahmed Mughassib's house in Wadi as-Salqa, east of Deir al-Balah, was hit by an artillery shell, wounding 4 family members (2 children and 2 women).
- At 22:20, an IAF missile damaged extensively Khaled al-Sinwar's house in al-Qarara village, northwest of Khan Yunis. Fifteen minutes later, an IAF missile struck the University College of Applied Sciences campus west of Khan Yunis, killing one service worker, Salah Saleh Ramadan al-Shaf'ei (24), and wounding another service worker.
- At 22:40, Hamdi Khader Obaid's house north of Beit Hanoun was shelled; wounding 21 family members (7 seriously).
- At 23:55, the bodies of three civilians killed and 20 othera wounded by tank shelling of houses near the Gaza International Airport, in al-Shouka and al-Nasser villages, east and north of Rafah, were retrieved by medical crews. Two hours later an elderly man's body was recovered from the vicinity of the airport. The dead were: Majdi Suleiman Jebara (22), Fares Jum'a al-Tarabin (3 months old), Omar Eid al-Mahmoum (17), and Selmiya Suleiman Abu Ghayad (70).
- Three children of the Musallem family died when a bedroom in their home in Al Nada Tawas was struck by an artillery shell: Mohammad (15), Walla (13) and Ahad (11).

== Day 11: Friday 18 July 2014 ==
By Friday evening into the 11th day of the war, 298 Palestinians had been killed and over 2,200 injured. 26 died by Friday evening after breaking their Ramadan fast, bringing the tally of dead from late Thursday to late Friday to 63.

From 10:00 on Friday, 18 July 2014 to 10:00 on Saturday, 19 July 2014, 53 Palestinians, 43 of whom civilians, including 17 children and a woman, were killed. 332 Palestinians, were wounded (including 89 children and 57 women). IAF strikes destroyed 26 houses.

- At 01:00, Mahmoud Hussein Nussair's house north of Beit Hanoun was shelled, killing two of his sons, Nassim (32) and Karam (31), and wounding a third, Mohammed (26).
- At 03:00, IAF struck the Abu Radwan quarter of al-Zanna, Bani Suheila, with several missiles, seriously wounded four members of the Radwan family, who died in the absence of medical care because medical crews could not arrive timely. The dead were: Ahmed Radwan (23), Mahmoud Fawzi Radwan (24), Bilal Mahmoud Radwan (23), and Munther Nabil Radwan (22).
- From 03:30 to past 07:00, 15 IAF strikes hit the al-Zanna area in Bani Suhaila and al-Qarara villages, as artillery shelled the zone, killing five people and wounding 29 others. The dead were: Hammad Abdul Karim Hammad Abu Lihya (23), Mohammed Abdul Fattah Rashad Fayad (26), Mahmoud Mohammed Fayad (25), Hani As'ad Abdul Karim al-Shami (35), and Mohammed Hamdan Abdul Karim al-Shami (35).
- At 04:00, an Israeli artillery shell struck Saqer Mansour Abu Tawila's house in the al-Shuja'iya neighborhood of Gaza City, killing the owner's son, Rami (47), and wounding three other family members.
- At 04:05, an IAF missile hit the home of Mohammed Ibrahim Zo'rob (45) in al-Nasser village, north of Rafah, killing a child, Siham Zo'rob (11), and wounding eleven other family members.
- At 06:10, the body of a militant, Yasser Mohammed Madhi (22), was recovered in Kherbat al-Adas.
- At 07:00, an IAF missile struck the Abu Ras family's engineering office in the al-Jawhara building, which houses 13 media institutions, damaging it beyond repair; a journalist, Mohammed Ahmed Shabat (45), was injured.
- At 11:00, Israeli tanks fired into Beit Hanoun, and a shell struck Na'im Mohammed Abu Musallam's flat, killing three of his children: Mohammed (15), Ahmed (11) and Walaa (14).
- At 12:30, a drone missile struck militants in Um al-Nasser village, killing Ahmed Abdullah al-Bahnasawi (23).
- At 14:25 medical crews recovered a body in al-Qarara village after it had been struck, leaving Abdullah Jum'a al-Sumairi (17) dead, and his father and four brothers wounded.
- At 14:40, medical crews recovered the bodies of two men, Saleh Suleim al-Zughaibi (22) and Alaa Mohammed Abu Shabab (23), killed by a tank shell near a mosque in al-Shouka.
- At 15:30, an IAF missile struck the al-Batrawi family house west of al-Nussairat refugee camp, killing one militant, Mahmoud Ali Darwish (40), and wounding three civilians.
- At 16:00, a drone missile wounded five militants, one of whom, Ra'fat Ali Bahloul (27), later died.
- At 16:15, a drone missile killed two militants, Hamada Abdullah Mohammed al-Bashiti (21) and Ahmed Hassan Saleh al-Ghalban (22) in al-Fukhari village, southeast of Khan Yunis.
- At 16:25, a drone missile was allegedly fired at Beit Lahiya cemetery, killing Mohammed Awadh Matar Matar (38).
- At 16:50, a drone missile struck militants east of Khan Yunis, killing Walaa Jihad Mohammed al-Qarra (26).
- At 17:30, an IAF missile struck former Minister of Interior Fathi Hammad's 5-storey house in Beit Lahiya, furthering damage made by an earlier strike.
- At 19:00, a drone missile wounded a militant, Mohammed Sa'ad Abu Sa'ada (23), in al-Zanna, east of Khan Yunis; he later died from his injuries.
- At 19:40, Israeli tanks shelled houses in al-Nasser village, northeast of Rafah, killing Hamza Mohammed Abu al-Hussain (27).
- At 19:50, Israeli artillery shelling wounded five civilians at al-Fukhari, southeast of Khan Yunis.
- At 20:00, Yousef Ibrahim Hassan al-Astal (23), a militant, died of his injuries, sustained one day earlier, on 14 July, in an airstrike on al-Mawasi, west of Khan Yunis.
- At 20:00, Israeli tank shells struck targets in Wadi al-Salqa village, east of Deir al-Balah, killing one person, Sa'ad Ali Ahmed Abu Eissa, and wounding two others.

At 20:15, Israeli tanks fired into east of Gaza City, with two shells hitting Ahmed Adnan al-Hayek's house in al-Tuffah, killing one of his sons, Rezeq al-Hayek (4), and wounding another, Malak al-Hayek (14).

- At 20:30, two Israeli artillery shells hit Hamed Fa'eq Olwan's house in al-Tuffah, Gaza City, killing two of his children, Qassem (4) and Emad (7), and wounding a third, Abdullah (14).
- At 21:15, a drone missile hit an area in al-Manara, south of Khan Yunis, killing Ghassan Mousa Abu Azab (28) and injuring his brother.
- At 21:25, Israeli tank fire shelled Abdul Rahman Mousa Khalil Abu Jarad's house, killing him, his wife and five others. The dead were: Abdul Rahman Mousa Khalil Abu Jarad (32), Rajaa Olayan Khalil Abu Jarad (28), Mousa Abu Jarad (8 months), Sameeh Abu Jarad (18 months), Haniya Abu Jarad (2), Ahlam Mousa Abu Jarad (16), Na'im Mousa Khalil Abu Jarad (23), and Samar Mousa Abu Jarad.
- At 21:45, an IAF missile struck Abdul Hakim Asfour's 3-storey house in Abassan village, east of Kahn Yunis; medical crews took away one body, that of Bilal Ismail Abu Daqqa (32).
- At 21:55, a drone missile targeted members of the al-Loulahi and Abu Sneineh families in al-Nasser, northeast of Rafah, killing four people: Ismail Ramadan al-Loulahi (21), Nizar Fayez Abu Snaima (38 or 39), Emad Faisal Abu Snaima (18 or 20) and Mustafa Ouda Abu Snaima (32) Faisal Ouda Abu Snaima (42) and Riad (23), Faisal Ouda Abu Snaima's son, were wounded.
- At 22:30, 2 drone-fired missiles hit several civilians near al-Huda Mosque in al-Manara, south of Khan Yunis, killing three brothers: Ahmed (22), Mohammed (20) and Amjad Salem Khamis Sha'ath (15). Four others, believed to be civilians, were injured.
- At 23:00, the body of Mohammed Talal al-Sane (21), killed by Israeli tank shelling, was recovered in al-Shouka village, southeast of Rafah.
- A missile struck the Abu Jrad family home in Beit Hanoun killing eight people, including four children: Naim Musa Abu Jrad (23), Abd Musa Abu Jrad (30), Siham Musa Abu Jrad (26), Rija Aliyan Abu Jrad, Haniyah Abd al-Rahman Abu Jrad, Samih Naim Abu Jrad, Musa Abd al-Rahman Abu Jrad and Ahlam Musa Abu Jrad.
- At 22.30 an airstrike on the home of the Shaath family in al-Manara, Khan Yunis, killed four people and injured four others.
- At 22.30 Muhammad Talal al-Saneh (20) died following an Israeli attack.
- Ismail Ramadan Salmi (23) was dead on arrival at a hospital in Gaza.
- An Israeli strike in Khan Yunis killed two brothers, Ghassan Salem Abu Musa Abu Azzab (28) and Muhammad Salam Abu Musa Abu Azzab (19), from Hayy al-Manara.
- Muhammad Saad Mahmoud Abu Saadeh died in an airstrike on Khan Yunis.
- Hamza Mohammad Abu Hussein (27) died in an airstrike on Rafah.
- Mohammad Abu Sa'da was killed in Khan Yunis from artillery shelling.
- Two children, Imad Alwan and Qassim Alwan, died in eastern Gaza City from an artillery barrage.
- An airstrike on Shawwa Square in Gaza City resulted in the death of Rizk Ahmad al-Hayk (2).
- A strike in the Hayy al-Tuffah area of Gaza City resulted in the death of a teenager, Sarah Muhammad Bustan (13).
- After a week in hospital, Yusif Ibrahim Hasan al-Astal (23), died of his wounds Friday night.

== Day 12 Saturday 19 July ==
Date	Place	Target	Description	Action	Origin of missile
19 July 2014, 01:00	Al-Reqeb, Bani Suheila	A group of Palestinians	unspecified	Eyad Ismail Suleiman al-Raeqb (26), militant, killed.	IDF
8 July 2014, 01:10	Khan Yunis fishing harbour	2 IAF-launched missiles	unspecified	extensive damage; one injury	IDF
19 July 2014, 02:30	Gaza Strip	Ahmed Mahmoud Hussein Aziz's flat in al-Nada building	An artillery shell hit the flat	Ahmed Aziz was killed	IDF
8 July 2014, 03:35	al-Amal, Khan Yunis	Hussein Mansi al-Tartouri's house, home to 17 people	unreported	The family had been phoned to evacuate. An IAF missile destroyed the house, killing a neighbour, Ra'ed Waleed Ali Laqqn (32); a disabled woman was wounded.	IDF
19 July 2014, 09:30	Maghazi refugee camp	Homes in the district	unspecified	4,000 residences had to leave their homes for shelters in the central Gaza Strip	IDF
19 July 2014, 01:55	Khan Yunis refugee camp	2 drone-launched missiles	A group of Palestinians seated near their house	Nine civilians, including three children, killed: Yahia Bassam al-Sir (20); Mohammed Bassam al-Sir (17); Mohammed Mustafa Darwish Slahiya (32); Mohammed Salhiya (22); Mustafa Salhiya (21); Wassim Rida Salhiya (15); Ibrahim Jamal Kamal Nasser (13); Mohammed Awadh Fares Nasser (25); Rushdi Khaled Fares Nasser (25)	IAF.
19 July 2014, 06:50	Abassan village	Missile strike by a drone	Two men dead	Mohammed Jihad al-Qarra (29) died of wounds sustained hours earlier after a missile strike; his brother died earlier on Friday, 18 July.	IAF
?8 July 2014, 08:30	al-Zanna area	Missile strike by a drone	One man killed, another man wounded	Mohammed Ismail Sammour (21) killed	IDF

- A child, Muhammad Ziad al-Ruhhal, was killed in a house bombing, while dozens of others were injured.
- A strike on Gaza City's Abraj al-Mukhabarat killed Muhammad Abu Zaanouna and injured five other people.
- An IAF strike on the Tartouri family home in Khan Yunis killed one person, Raed Walid Laqan (27).
- Khalid al-Qarra died of wounds sustained during a raid earlier the same day.
- Iyad Ismail al-Ruqab (26) died following an Israeli strike at Bani Suheila.
- A third member of the Shaath family, Amjad Salim Shaath (15), who had been wounded in a strike which killed two of his brothers on Friday, 19 July, in the Moraj neighborhood in Khan Younis, died.
- Said Ali Issa (30) was killed in Juhor ad-Dik neighborhood near al-Bureij.
- Ahmad Mahmoud Hasan Aziz (34) was killed when a missile struck his home in Abraj al-Nada, northern Gaza.

== Day 13 Sunday 20 July ==
100 Gazan Palestinians were killed by nightfall. The casualties included 66 people killed in a single area, the Shuja'iyya neighbourhood of Gaza City A total of 9 separate families, numbering 73 people, were killed overall by the IDF this day.

- 1. Ibrahim Salem Jom'a as-Sahbani (20 or 22) Shuja'iyya, a paramedic of the Palestinian Civil Defense, was killed by an Israeli artillery shell while attempting to rescue the wounded.
- 2. Aref Ibrahim al-Ghalyeeni (26), Shuja'iyya.
- 3 Rebhi Shehta Ayyad (31), Shuja'iyya.
- 4. Yasser Ateyya Hamdiyya (28), Shuja'iyya.
- 5. Esra Ateyya Hamdiyya (28), Shuja'iyya.
- 6. Eman Khalil Abed Ammar (9), Shuja'iyya.
- 7 At 09:25, Iman Mohammad Ibrahim Hamada (40), of Shuja'iyya, was killed when an IAF missile hit Rushid Omar Hamada's home near Haidar Abdul Shafi Square, western Gaza City.
- 8. Ahmad Ishaq Yousef Ramlawy (33), of Shuja'iyya, was killed when a drone missile hit civilians fleeing from the al-Sha'af neighbourhood, together with Ibrahim Aaref al-Ghalayini, 30; Esleem Abu al-Khair.
- 9. Ahmed Suleiman Akram al-Atawai (65), and his grandchild, Tala Akram al-Atawi (7 or 10 years old), were killed as they were hit by Israeli artillery shells while running away from the area.
- 10. Tawfiq Barawi Salem Marshoud, (52 or 53), hit by an artillery shell on his house in Shuja'iyya.
- 11. Hatem Ziad Ali Za’bout (24), Shuja'iyya.
- 12. Khaled Riyadh Mohammad Hamad (25), killed in Shuja'iyya, while reporting as a photojournalist for Continue News Agency.
- 13. Khadija Ali Mousa Shihada (50 or 62), died in artillery shelling of her home in Zeitoun.

Date	Place	Target	Description	Action	Origin of missile
20 July 2014	Shuja'iyya neighbourhood	unknown	unknown	An IAF missile destroyed the al-Hayya home in al-Nassar Street, killing a woman and one other adult and three children. It was the 16th of 59 families killing by the IDF according to B'tselem.: (1) Osama Khalil Ismael al-Hayya (30); (2) Halah Abu Hin (26); (3) Umama Osama Khalil al-Hayya(8); (4) Khalil Osama Khalil al-Hayya (5); (5) Hamzah al-Hayah (4)	IAF

- 20. Khalil Salem Ibrahim Mosbeh (53), Shuja'iyya.
- 21. Adel Abdullah Eslayyem (2), Shuja'iyya.
- 22. Dina Roshdi Abdullah Eslayyem (2), Shuja'iyya.
- 23. Rahaf Akram Ismael Abu Jom'a (4), Shuja'iyya.
- 24. Shadi Ziad Hasan Eslayyem (15 or 16; aka Shadi Hassan Esleem), Shuja'iyya, killed by artillery shelling on al-Mansour Street.
- 25. Ala Ziad Hasan Eslayyem (10/11= Fadi Diab Hassan Esleem?), Shuja'iyya. Killed by artillery shelling on al-Mansour Street.
- 26. Sherin Fathi Othman Ayyad (18; aka Fathi Ayad) Shuja'iyya.
- 27. Ghada Sobhi Sa'adi Ayyad (13; aka Ghada Subhi Ayad)), Shuja'iyya.
- 28. Adel Abdullah Salem Eslayyem (29), Shuja'iyya.
- 29. Asem Khalil Abed Ammar (4), Shuja'iyya.
- 30. Ahed Sa'ad Mousa Sarsak (30), Shuja'iyya, drone missile attack on his house.
- 31. Aisha Ali Mahmoud Zayed (54), Shuja'iyya.

Date	Place	Target	Description	Action	Origin of missile
20 July 2014	Shuja'iyya neighbourhood	unknown	unknown	A missile strike on Abdul-Rahman Akram Sheikh Khalil's house in al-Mansour Street killed him and four members of his family, including one minor. It was the 17th of 59 bombed families according to B'tselem.: 1. Abdul-Rahman Akram Sheikh Khalil (50; aka Abdul Rahman Mohammed al-Sheikh Khalil); 2. Yusuf Habib (60); 3. Muna Suleiman Ahmad Sheikh Khalil (44).; 4. Hiba Hamed Mohammad Sheikh Khalil (14).; 5. Ayidah Sheikh Khalil (45)	IAF

- 35. Aaida Mohammed al-Sheikh Khalil (45)
- 36. Yousef Salem Hamattu Habib (60) was killed as he was passing near the al-Sheikh Khalil house.
- 37. Abdullah Mansour Radwan Amara (23), Shuja'iyya, militant.
- 38. Abed-Rabbo Ahmad Zayed (58), Shuja'iyya.
- 39 Issam Atiyya Sa'id Skafy (25 or 26), Shuja'iyya, killed reportedly with six (6) others in the Eskafi family in al-Nazzaz Street.
- 40. Ali Mohammad Hasan Skafy (27 or 29), Shuja'iyya.
- 41. Mohammad Hasan Skafy (49 or 53), Shuja'iyya.
- 42. Mos’ab el-Kheir Salah ed-Din Skafi (27 or 28), Shuja'iyya – Gaza.
- 43. Akram Mohammad Shkafy, Shuja'iyya.
- 44. Ala Jamal ed-Deen Barda (35), Shuja'iyya, artillery shell on his house.
- 45. Omar Jamil Sobhi Hammouda (10), Shuja'iyya.
- 46. Ghada Jamil Sobhi Hammouda (10), Shuja'iyya.
- 47. Ghada Ibrahim Suleiman Adwan (39), Shuja'iyya.
- 48. Fatima Abdul-Rahim Abu Ammouna (55), Shuja'iyya.
- 49. Fahmi Abdul-Aziz Abu Sa'id (29), Shuja'iyya.
- 50. Maisa Abdul-Rahman Sarsawy (35 or 37), Shuja'iyya, an IAF missile hit the house of mother and child.
- 51. Marwa Salman Ahmad Sarsawy (12 or 13), Shuja'iyya.
- 52. Mohammad Ashraf Rafiq Ayyad (3 or 6), Shuja'iyya.
- 53. Mohammad Ra'ed Ehsan Ayyad (6), Shuja'iyya.
- 54. Mohammad Rami Fathi Ayyad, (2 or 3), Shuja'iyya.
- 55. Halla Sobhi Sa'dy Ayyad (25; pregnant), Shuja'iyya.
- 56 Ahmad Sami Diab Ayyad (27 or 28), Shuja'iyya.
- 57. Fida Rafiq Diab Ayyad (24), Shuja'iyya.
- 58. Mona Abdul-Rahman Ayyad, Shuja'iyya.
- 59. Narmin Rafiw Diab Ayyad (20), Shuja'iyya.
- 60. Mohammad Ra'ed Ehsan Akeela (19), Shuja'iyya.
- 61. Mohammad Ziad Ali Za'bout (23), Shuja'iyya.
- 62. Mohammad Ali Mohared Jundiyya (26), Shuja'iyya, killed by an Israeli artillery shell that hit his house.,
- 63. Marah Shaker Ahmad al-Jammal (2), Shuja'iyya.
- 64. Marwan Monir Saleh Qonfid/Khalaf (23), Shuja'iyya, killed in the shelling of al-Mansour Street.
- 65. Ahmad Mohammad Ahmad Abu Za'nouna (28).
- 66. Hallah Saqer Hasan al-Hayya (29), Shuja'iyya.
- 67. At 04:15, Younis Ahmad Younis Mustafa (61 or 62), Shuja'iyya, killed by drone missile while walking to a local mosque for dawn prayer.
- At 10:30, a drone missile in Bani Suheila, east of Khan Yunis, killed a militant, Suleiman Mohammed Abu Fsaifes (33).
- At 11:20, a drone missile killed one militant, Wissam Majdi Mohammed Hammouda (29), in Jabaliya.
- At 12:00, an IAF missile destroyed Salah Saleh al-Sha'er‘s 2-storey house, killing the owner and three family members, and wounding another nine (9) people. The dead were: Salah Saleh al-Sha'er (55), Leila Hassan al-Sha'er (30), Mohammed Ayman al-Sha'er (5) and Hiba Akram Saleh al-Sha'er (15).
- At 12:30, Sunday, 20 July 2014, Israeli tanks positioned at the border between the Gaza Strip and Israel, east of Rafah, fired 2 shells at a flat rented by Fusion Internet Company on the 6th floor of al-Tahreer building near al-Awda Square in the center of Rafah, about 5,000 meters away from the border. The flat was partially destroyed.
- At 12:35, a missile strike wounded a militant on a motorbike in Beit Lahiya, as well as a woman and four children.
- At 12:50, 2 IAF missiles struck without a prior warning Abdul Jabbar Khalil Darraji's house in Rafah's al-Junaina neighborhood, killing the owner's wife, Najah Sa'duddin Darraji (49), and a child, Abdullah Yousef Darraji (2), as well as wounding 11 members of the family.
- Between 13:00 and 14:00, 2 drone missiles fired at Abassan and Bani Suheila villages killed two civilians, Suleiman Ahmed Abu Jame (14) and Mohammed Buhdar al-Daghma (25), and wounded four (4) others.

Date	Place	Target	Description	Action	Origin of missile
20 July 2014, 14:00	al-Bureij refugee camp Deir al-Balah	Muhammad al-Maqadmeh (30)	Hamas militant	The missile struck the 4 storey-house of Khaled (Abu Suhayb) Ziadah/Ziyadah, home to 20 people, targeting one Hamas militant inside. He was killed, as were, collaterally, 6 members of the Ziadah family. This is the 19th bombing of an entire family in B'tselem's list of 59 such incidents.: 1. Muhammad al-Maqadmeh (30), described as a guest.; 2. Muftiyah Ziadah (70) matriarch; 3. Jamil Ziadah (53), husband of Bayan, father of Sha'ban; 4. Yusef Ziadah (43); 5. Bayan Ziadah (39); 6. Omar Ziadah (32); 7. Sha'ban Ziadah (12); The incident led to the renunciation by Dutch citizen Henk Zanoli (then aged 91) of the medals awarded to him and his mother as righteous gentiles in recognition of their successful effort to save a Jewish child, 12-year-old boy, Elhanan Pinto, from the Holocaust. He is related to the Palestinian family through his niece's husband.	IAF missile strike

- At 14:15, Turkiya al-Abed Mohammed al-Bis (77) of Um al-Nasser village was removed from her house with injuries from being hit by shrapnel to the face.
- At 15:00, Israeli tanks fired a number of shells at houses in al-Nasser village, northeast of Rafah. As a result, fire broke out in house belonging to Jawad Abu al-Hussain.
- At 15:00, Israeli tanks fired a number of shells at houses in al-Salam neighborhood in the south of Rafah. Mohammed Raja Mohammed Handam (15) was killed, and his father (43) was seriously wounded.
- At 15:20, a drone missile struck militants in the al-Twam neighborhood, west of Jabaliya, killing one, Ashraf Ahmed Mousa al-Silawi (36), and wounding another.
- At 15:30, four IAF strikes at Abassan and at al-Zanna, killing two militants, Bassem Mohammed al-Buraim (24) and Ahmed Abdul Rahman Abu Tayem (27), and wounded four other people.
- At 16:00, a drone missile at a flat on the third floor of Abdul Azizi Abdul Hamid al-Kurd's house in the Bureij al-Boreij refugee camp, killing the owner's son, Ismail (21), a Hamas militant.
- At 16:20, the bodies of two militants, Mustafa Khamis Mustafa Elwan (22) and Abdul Rahman Mustafa Diab al-Faqih (27), were recovered from a Jabaliya house from the debris of an IAF bombing.
- At 17:00, a drone missile killed a couple, Abed Rabbu Ahmed Mohammed Zayed (58) and Aa'esha Ali Mohammed Zayed (54), in their garden.
- At 18:00, a drone missile struck the house of the Officer in Charge of Mobilization and Organization in the Ministry of Interior, Bahjat Hassan Mohammed Abu Sultan, in Beit Lahiya, killing his child and wounding four family members.

Date	Place	Target	Description	Action	Origin of missile
20 July 2014, 19:20	al-Remal neighborhood Gaza City	unknown	unknown	Two missiles struck the Cordoba building's al-Hajj house, home to the al-Halak and 'Amar families, killing 11 members of both. It was the 20th incident of 59 in which families were killed in B'tselem's list.: 1. Ibrahim Khalil Abed Ammar (12/13); 2. Kenan Hasan Akram al-Halaq (6).; 3. Saje Hasan Akram al-Hallaq (4).; 4. Mohammad Hani Mohammad al-Hallaq (2); 5. Su'ad Mohammad Abdul-Razeq al-Hallaq (60/62).; 6. Samar Osama Khalil al-Hallaq (29/30; 9 months pregnant).; 7. Hani Mohammad Ahmad al-Hallaq (50).; 8. Hala Akram Hasan al-Hallaq (26/27).; 9. Aassem Khalil Ammar (4); 10. Iman Khalil Ammar (9); 11. Rahaf Akram Abu Jum'a (4)	IAF missile strike

Date	Place	Target	Description	Action	Origin of missile
20 July 2014, 19:00/19:50	Bani Suheila	Ahmad Suliman Sahmoud (34).	Hamas militant	According to B'tselem, Hamas militant Sahmoud was visiting a member of the Abu Jame family in their home. 26 bodies were retrieved from the rubble, including that of the target of the strike; three (3) family members wounded. 7 adults were killed and 19 minors. According to B'tselem, it was the 21st of 59 family killed by Israeli bombing.: 1. Fatmeh Ahmad Abu Jame (60), the family matriarch.; 2. Sabah Abu Jame (35), Fatmeh's daughter-in-law and her family; 3. Razan Tawfiq Ahmad Abu Jame (14); 4. Jawdat Tawfiq Ahmad Abu Jame (13); 5. Aya Tawfiq Ahmad Abu Jame (12); 6. Haifaa Tawfiq Ahmad Abu Jame (9); 7. Ahmad Tawfiq Ahmad Abu Jame (8); 8. Maysaa Tawfiq Ahmad Abu Jame (7); 9. Tawfiq Ahmad Abu Jame (4); 10. Shahinaz Walid Muhammad Abu Jame (29), Fatmeh's pregnant daughter-in-law and family; 11. Fatmeh Taysir Ahmad Abu Jame (12); 12. Ayub Taysir Ahmad Abu Jame (10); 13. Rayan Taysir Ahmad Abu Jame (5); 14. Rinat Taysir Ahmad Abu Jame (2); 15. Nujud Taysir Ahmad Abu Jame (4 months); 16. Yasmin Ahmad Salameh Abu Jame (25), Fatmeh's pregnant daughter-in-law and her family: 17. Bitul Bassam Ahmad Abu Jame (4); 18. Soheila Bassam Ahmad Abu Jame(3); 19. Bisan Bassam Ahmad Abu Jame (6 months); 20. Yasser Ahmad Muhammad Abu Jame (27), Fatmeh's son and daughter-in-law; 21. Fatmeh Riad Abu Jame (26), pregnant; 22. Sajedah Yasser Ahmad Abu Jame (7); 23. Siraj Yasser Ahmad Abu Jame (4); 24. Nur Yasser Ahmad Abu Jame (2); 25. Husam Husam Abu Qeins (7; Fatmeh's grandson); 26. Ahmad Suliman Sahmoud (34; targeted Hamas operative)	IAF

- At 22:00, Fatema Abdul Rahim Abdul Qader Abu Ammouna (a 55-year-old woman), died when a nearby house was bombed by the IAF in the Tel al-Hawa neighbourhood.
- A woman from Abassan, Rajaa Hammad Mohammed al-Daghma (38), who had been struck on 18 July, died in an Egyptian hospital that same evening.

== Day 14 Monday 21 July ==
- At 01:30, Manwa Abdul Basset Ahmed al-Bo (30), died of chest wounds she suffered two days earlier, on 19 July, after being shot while returning to her home near Beit Hanoun.
- At 03:20, three drone missiles targeted a group of militants near Rafah's old fishing harbor, killing Ra'ed Ismail al-Bardawil (26), and wounding two other people.
- At 03:50 a drone missile killed two militants, Bilal Jaber Mohammed al-Ashab (22) and Abdul Rahman Faraj al-Toum (22), in al-Mughraqa.
- At 04:30, Zkaria Mas'oud al-Ashqar (24) was killed when the Tafesh family home was struck by a missile in al-Zaytoun.
- At 06:00, a drone missile struck Talal Hassan al-Masri's house in Beit Hanoun, killing his son, Kamal al-Masri (23).
- At 06:00, the Azzam house was hit by artillery in al-Zaytoun, killing Ahmed Mohammed Hassan Azzam (22).
- At 06:30, 5 drone missiles hit the al-Siamat neighborhood, north of Rafah, striking a park, the Zo'rob family home, and Ahmed Salman Abu Snaima's home, wounding him. The 5th struck near Mahrous Salam Siam's home as the family was leaving, killing nine (9) people and wounding another nine people, including seven children. The dead were: Shireen Mohammed Siam (31), Dalal Siam (9 months), Bader Siam (4), Ghaida Siam (7), Mustafa Siam (9), Mohammed Mahrous Siam (27), Somoud Siam (26), Kamal Mahrous Siam (31), and Ahmed Ayman Siam (15).
- At 07:00, a drone missile targeted and killed a militant, Yousef Ahmed al-Zamli (24), near his house in al-Shouka, southeast of Rafah.
- At 07:30, a drone missile killed a teenager, Abdullah Trad Abu Hujayer (16), on his motorbike at the entrance to the al-Nussairat refugee camp.
- At 09:00, shelling killed a young man, Ahmed Fayeq Jum'a Yassin (22) in al-Zaytoun, Gaza.
- At 16:55 Maghazi Prep School A & B, where approximately 1,000 people were sheltering, was struck by explosive ordnance, resulting in an injury to one child.

== Day 15 Tuesday 22 July ==
In the late morning, Al Jazeera stated their office was currently under attack by the IDF. The IDF denied this, but could not rule out indirect damage from nearby targets.

== Day 16 Wednesday 23 July ==
During the night, a number of reports began circulating that the IDF was shelling the Al-Wafa hospital. The IDF later commented that, on several occasions, they were under direct fire from the hospital, a violation of international law; they stated that they had been warning the hospital for several days to move the patients. A doctor from the hospital, Dr. Basman Alashi, confirmed that the hospital had been evacuated prior to the strike.

The IDF released a video showing fire shot from the hospital, IDF's warning calls and finally the airstrike which triggered secondary explosions from weapons cached inside the hospital.

- At 7:47 the Deir al-Balah Preparatory Girls School C, sheltering 1,500 refugees, was hit by a strike, wounding five people.

== Day 17 Thursday 24 July ==
Date	Place	Target	Description	Action	Origin of missile
14:50	Beit Hanoun UNRWA Elementary Co-Ed School A D	unknown	unknown	According to Palestinian accounts, Israeli tanks in Beit Hanoun fired 5 shells at the school, one shell landing in the playground and several others striking the upper stories of the school, at the time a shelter to 800/1,500, wounding some 200 mainly women and children war refugees. The IDF said it had told UNRWA to evacuate the site days earlier. UNRWA officials say they had problems obtaining a safety corridor through the fighting. Original reports spoke of 16/17 dead. Israel and Hamas blamed each other. An IDF inquiry cleared itself of any blame for the deaths: it found that only one IDF mortar shell landed inside the school courtyard, but that no children were present on the scene. 11 Palestinians died, including 7 children and 2 women, and 110 civilians, including 55 children and 31 women, were wounded.: (1) Awadh Abdul Majid Hassan Abu Ouda (39); (2) Bilal Ahmed Tawfiq al-Shanbari (21); (3) Abed Rabbu Jamal Ayoub al-Shanbari (17); (4) Suha Abed Rabbu Mohammed Mosleh (2); (5) Mohammed Akram Abdul Aziz al-Kafarna (15); (6) Fatema Mohammed Ayoub al-Shanbari (47); (7) Abed Rabbu Shaiboub Ahmed al-Shanbari (16); (8) Palestine Hussein Hassan al-Shanbari (40); (9) Miriam Shaiboub Ahmed al-Shanbari (11); (10) Ali Shaiboub Ahmed al-Shanbari (9); (11) Hassan Abdullah Mustafa al-Athamna (59)	IDF mortar or Hamas mortar is subject of dispute

== Day 19 Saturday 26 July ==
By the time a 12-hour humanitarian truce came into effect at 8 am, the death toll from Israeli strikes had risen to 940, and the number of injured had gone to 5,700.

Date	Place	Target	Description	Action	Origin of missile
Around 03:00 (Some Palestinian sources first placed it close to the hour the truce came into effect, at 08:00.)	Khan Yunis Refugee Camp	unknown	unknown	An airstrike killed 21 members of Samir Hussein Muhammed al-Najjar’s family, including 11 children and 5 women, who had fled from their home when their village Khuza'a came under artillery fire, and sought shelter further from the border in a 2-storey building in the Sheikh Nasser east of Khan Yunis, reportedly belonging to Samir al-Najjar.: (1) Samir Hussein Mohammed al-Najjar (58); (2) Ghalia Mohammed al-Najjar (56); (3) Majid Samir Al-Najjar 19); (4) Kifah Samir al-Najjar (24); (5) Samar (26); (6) Amir (2); (7) Islam Hammoudeh Abu Shahla (3); (8) Amira Hammouda Hussein al-Najjar (8 months); (9) Riham Fayez al-Najjar (19/25, pregnant); (10) Ulfat Hussein al-Najjar (4); (11) Samir Hussein al-Najjar (2); (12) Mutaz Hussein al-Najjar (6); (13) Husam Hussein al-Najjar (7); (14) Iman Salah Mahmoud al-Najjar (23, pregnant); (15) Ghalia Mohammed Samir al-Najjar (1); (16) Bara'a Salah Mahmoud al-Reqeb (11); (17) Khalil Mohmammed al-Najjar (60); (18) Rawan Khaled al-Najjar (17); (19) Ahmed Khaled Mohammed al-Najjar (14); (20) Sumaya Harb al-Najjar (50); (21) Hani Suleiman Mohammed al-Najjar (7).	IAF missile strike

== Day 22 Tuesday 29 July ==
- Zaitoun Preparatory Girls School B, sheltering approximately 2,200 people was struck, wounding eight people.

== Day 23 Wednesday 30 July ==
- 04:40-04:45. Jabaliya Elementary Girls School A & B, sheltering about 3,200 internally displaced people, was hit by 10 155-millimeter artillery shells, two of which struck the roof of the room where children and women were sleeping and one striking the courtyard where men were at prayer, killing 21 and wounding more than 100. Ban Ki-Moon stated that all available evidence pointed to Israeli artillery. The New York Times investigation noted that the ID produced no evidence of militants presence in the school; militants were active 200 yards away, and the strike was due to artillery use without precision use.

== Day 25 Friday 1 August ==
A ceasefire had been brokered to begin at 08:00. 3 IDF soldiers and at least 130 Palestinians were killed in Rafah during an operation to impede the successful abduction of an Israeli lieutenant. According to Israeli sources, the incidents occurred when Hamas broke the ceasefire by shooting three soldier around 09:16. According to Hamas, Israel broke the ceasefire, and the operations referred to occurred around 07:30. The casualties were in large part a result of Israel's use of the Hannibal Directive. According to interviews of survivors of the carpet-bombing in Rafah, they had returned to their homes in anticipation of the cease-fire, only to hear loud explosions around 07:30 near Abu Rous, close to the ruins of the Yasser Arafat International Airport.

== Day 27 Sunday 3 August ==
- 10:50 a projectile, from either a drone or shelling struck 8–10 metres outside the open gates of the Rafah Boys Preparatory School A, killing 11, of which 5 children between 3–15 years old, and wounding 27. The IDF said the strike had neutralized 3 Islamic jihad militants riding on a motorbike outside the school.

== Day 28 Thursday 21 August ==
- On or around 21 August, Hamas killed 18 males, alleged to have been informers, following the assassination of three high-ranking Hamas militants by the Israelis forces. Israelis killed more than 2,000 Palestinians in total since July–August.

== See also ==
- List of Palestinian rocket attacks on Israel, 2014
- Targeted killings by Israel Defense Forces
