= 2014 Gaza war beach bombings =

Israeli missile strikes on civilians

2014 Gaza war beach bombing incidents
- Part of the 2014 Gaza War
- 2014 Gaza war beach bombings (the Gaza Strip) 2014 Gaza war beach bombings (State of Palestine)
- Location: Khan Yunis and Gaza City, Gaza Strip
- Date: 9 and 16 July 2014
- Attack type: Airstrike, naval fire
- Deaths: 13
- Victim: Palestinian youth
- Perpetrator: Israel Defense Forces

The 2014 Gaza war beach bombings refers to two attacks that took place during the 2014 Gaza War on 9 and 16 July. In the first bombing, Israeli missiles killed nine Palestinian children and young adults while they were following the 2014 FIFA World Cup on TV. In the second bombing, four Palestinian children were killed by Israeli naval fire while playing on a beach.

The second attack was conducted in front of hotels that sheltered foreign journalists, several of whom witnessed the Israeli shelling, and at least one of whom described the targeting of the children as intentional. Several eyewitnesses have remarked that, even at a distance, it was clear that the targets of the Israeli attack were children. An Israeli military police cleared the IDF of any wrongdoing, but the investigation was criticized by Adalah for only collecting testimony from Israeli soldiers, while ignoring the testimony of both international journalists and the Palestinian witnesses.

A United Nations Fact Finding Mission on the 2014 Israel–Gaza conflict, reviewing the evidence, found that the Israeli military had failed in its obligations to adopt feasible measures to avoid or minimize incidental harm to civilians.

== 9 July ==
On 9 July, a semi-final match between Argentina and the Netherlands was broadcast as part of the 2014 FIFA World Cup knockout stage. In the 48 hours since the outbreak of hostilities, Israel had launched an aerial blitz that struck over 750 locations in the Gaza Strip.

On a beach in the al-'Izbeh area of Khan Younis, roughly 30 metres from the shoreline and 200 metres from housing, around a dozen Palestinians had gathered at the Fun Time Beach café (Waqt al-Marah) to watch a broadcast of the game. The café, owned by the al-Sawalli family, and, according to a local PNA-employed policeman, Wael Soboh, not a military area, was a makeshift arrangement covered by cloth, umbrellas and palm leaves, furnished with plastic chairs and a converted container which served as the kitchen. The portable television was powered by a generator. All of the victims were avid soccer fans. It was customary for the two Sawalli brothers, who would be killed in the strike, to break the Ramadan fast at the café, which was also considered a safe place. The other victims also used the café's services for the iftar meal, to break their fast, though a survivor said that youths had also come to the café because it had a generator for its television, and there had been an electrical outage earlier in Khan Yunis. Palestinians like many in the Arab world, it was reported, could follow the games by courtesy of the Israeli broadcast service. The youths were aware that the Gaza Strip was being bombed, but heard no aircraft in their vicinity, and were relaxed.

Half an hour into the match, at 11:30 p.m., an Israeli missile blasted the flimsy roof of the improvised café cratering the site and killing 3 sets of brothers and a cousin, Two 15-year-olds were killed, and 3 people were wounded, including a 13-year-old boy. The missile's impact was such that it left a hole so deep seawater seeped in from underground to fill it. The body of Salim Sawalli could not be found immediately, but later the following day bulldozers managed to find his remains, bringing the death toll to 9. Gaza's emergency services spokesman Ashraf al-Qudra commented: "Israel won 9-0". A bystander Ahmed al-Aqad made a similar quip: "And the result from this match here? The Jews won 9-0,". Another 15 people were wounded.

Those killed were: Ahmed Astal (18), Suleiman Astal (16), Musa (16, a cousin of the Astals), Mohammed Ganan (24), Ibrahim Ganan (25), Hamdi Sawalli (20), Ibrahim Sawalli (28), Salim Sawalli (23, body not recovered) and Mohammed Fawana (18).

=== IDF investigation ===
The IDF said it was investigating this incident and another bombing with substantial civilian casualties on the same night roughly three hours later in Khan Younis Refugee Camp which killed 8 members of the Al Haj family. Israeli Foreign Ministry spokesman Yigal Palmor stated that Hamas was exposing Palestinians to Israeli attacks by operating "within houses and streets and neighborhoods which are populated with civilians,... exposing these civilians to retaliation and to backfire."

Israel said the incident was designed as a precision strike with the missile aimed at a single terrorist, and Peter Lerner, the IDF spokesman, said that in such operations, no warning is given. The spokesperson did not have information on the identity of the target.

=== Responses to Israel's preliminary investigation ===
Human Rights Watch, after an investigation, cited the case as an apparent example of Israel targeting civilian structures and people in violation of the laws of war. No evidence had been provided that any in the cafe had been engaged in terrorist activities.

== 16 July ==
Just after 4 p.m. an offshore Israeli naval vessel fired two rounds into a beachfront area in Gaza City's harbour. The port was closed that day, after Israel had prohibited fisherman from venturing out to sea. The four friends had gone to the beach to play in a cooler area; they met some journalists there, one of whom played some football with them. One journalist also told them the area was dangerous. The first shell hit a fishermen's jetty. Several boys were playing in the area at the time. On the explosion at the jetty, they all fled but were unable to outrun the second shell, which landed in their midst and killed 4 boys aged between 9 and 11, all cousins in a family group forming part of the extensive Bakr clan. This brought the Palestinian death toll through a week of hostilities to 213, among whom 43 were children, according to Hamas; 1,600 had been wounded. Israel in the same period suffered one fatality, Dror Hanin, killed by a mortar shell near the Erez Crossing. According to survivor Hamad Bakr, the boys were playing hide-and-seek at the time. NBC News Foreign Correspondent Ayman Mohyeldin testified on his Twitter account that just a few minutes before the shelling, he came across the boys while returning to his hotel from the office, playing in a sidestreet and kicked a football with the children, who then went down to the beach to continue playing.

The killed were:

- Ismail Mohammed Bakr (9)
- Zakaria Ahed Bakr (10)
- Ahed Atef Bakr (10)
- Mohamed Ramez Bakr (11).

The injured were:

- Hamad Bakr (13) with shrapnel wounds in his chest. His father's fishing boat was located at the site.
- Muntasir (Motasem) Bakr (11) wounded in the head and legs
- Mohammad Abu Watfah (21) hit in the stomach by shrapnel.
- A fourth person, a man in his 30s, was also hit in the stomach.

Several journalists were present during the incident, and some directly observed it at approximately 200 metres distance from the Al-Deira hotel. After the jetty explosion, the four, 3 of whom were visibly children at that distance, jumped from the harbour wall and ran frantically across the open space towards the safety of the hotel, waving and shouting as they raced past beach tents, in the direction of the journalists in the hotel. Within 40 seconds, according to Peter Beaumont of The Guardian, a second shell, lobbed after the aim was apparently adjusted to target the fleeing survivors, exploded in their midst.

Mark Regev, spokesman for Prime Minister Benjamin Netanyahu, commented: "The story with these four boys is a tragedy (...). Let's be clear, the Israeli military does not target civilians".

At the funeral soon afterwards, Abdel Kareem Bakr, an uncle of the victims, said: "It's a cold-blooded massacre. It's a shame they didn't identify them as kids with all of the advanced technology they claim they're using." An IDF comment stated that while it was investigating the incident, a preliminary analysis indicated that Hamas terrorist operatives had been targeted, and that the civilians were victims of "a tragic accident." NBC almost immediately ordered its reporter Ayman Mohyeldin to leave Gaza, citing security concerns given the imminence of an Israel ground invasion. He was replaced by another NBC foreign correspondent, Richard Engel.

=== Israeli internal investigation and the United Nations Commission response ===
The Israeli internal investigation into the incident was concluded 11 months later in June 2015. After a thorough review, involving extensive interviews with IDF soldiers and officers who planned and executed the operation, analysis of many documents, video footage, and attempts to interview Gazans allegedly witnesses to the incident (who refused to be interviewed but three supplied affidavits) the official IDF result cleared itself of culpability. According to Peter Lerner, the firing targeted a Hamas Naval Police and Naval Force "compound", used exclusively by militants, and closed off from the rest of the area by a fence. It added that it had attacked a weapon-storage 'container' inside the compound a day earlier. From aerial observation operational staff had concluded Hamas figures were entering the area to conduct a military action, and authorization was given to fire a missile after one of the identified figures entered the container and after 'a civilian presence in the area' had been ruled out. The missile struck the target, and a second was fired at the fleeing figures. It concluded that, 'It should be stressed that the figures were not identified at any point during the incident, as children' The credibility of its own internal investigations, Israel maintains, renders any International Criminal Court review, as the Palestinian Authority is seeking, unnecessary. The reason why children were there was, it stated, 'unclear'.

The United Nations Commission into the 2014 conflict examined the evidence, from the IDF's own documents and independent analysis of field reports, and concluded that the IDF had failed to take the appropriate precautions stipulated by the rules of protecting civilians in a conflict. The stature of the boys was small compared to adults; no IDF soldiers, potentially exposed to danger, were in the area as the ground invasion had not yet got underway; no other persons were in imminent danger, and therefore there was no urgency in launching a strike. The IDF, it concluded, could therefore have taken more exhaustive measures to verify whether or not the targeted people were militants. Lastly, the compound was located in the centre of a city with a half a million residents, between a public beach and a fisherman's area, close to international hotels lodging journalists, facts that would not rule out the possibility civilians might in the area. The assumption was made that the targets were militants based on their presence in a particular area, a premise that 'reversed the presumption of civilian status'. The internal IDF investigation did not appear to have questioned many people who were direct witnesses to the incident.

=== Response by foreign journalists present in Gaza ===
Journalists said what had been struck by the shelling was a small dilapidated fisherman's hut. Peter Beaumont, who was present, said the investigators made no attempt to take a statement from him personally, that no one had observed militants in the area at the time. Further, the breakwater was readily accessible through a side lane, is located on one of the busiest sectors of a public beach, and used regularly by both fishermen and sunbathers. The container did not appear to have military supplies. What is not clear, Beaumont said, is why the IDF failed to identify the figures as children playing on a beach. Writing for The Globe and Mail, Patrick Martin, who was also present that day, said the report's description did not tally with the fact that the "compound" described as spanning "the length of the breakwater of the Gaza City seashore" was mainly used by fishermen: fishing boats, not Hamas naval vessels, are tethered all along it, as satellite images reveal. People in the area would have most likely been fishermen, or children, not militants, he concluded. Paul Mason, who was present in the area some days later, asked why with overhead drone footage and high-resolution optical devices from ships off-shore, the IDF was unable to distinguish 10-year-olds from physically fit scuba-diving commandos preparing an attack. Why should such an attack take place in broad daylight?

=== Aftermath ===
Photojournalist Dan Cohen paid a follow-up visit in June 2015 to the Bakr clan. They now live on the edges of the Shati Refugee Camp, The surviving son, Muntasir, regarded by his family as a "living martyr", bears shrapnel in his head, suffers severe trauma, as yet untreated, requiring treatment not available in Gaza, and is prone to violence, having attempted suicide and attacked his siblings. At the time of Cohen's visit, the family could not afford the psychiatric medicine Muntasir required. The clan is affiliated politically with Fatah, and the family says Hamas has done nothing to help them out since the incident. According to the boy's account:

"We barely started playing when the first missile exploded right next to my cousin Ismael," he said. "We started running away and then I told them 'lets go back and get Ismael then we'll run away again.' When we did that another missile exploded right next to us. My brother and my nephew died because they let go of my hand. Two missiles exploded around me. It was foggy when we were running, I turned around and saw my nephew and brother lying on the ground."

Before the war, he intended following his father's footsteps, to become a fisherman, but now wishes to become a militant. Eight other members of the family died six months later, in an attempt to escape from the Gaza Strip and reach Europe. A cousin, Mowfaq, decided after the boys' funeral to lead his family out, since though unscathed by the conflict so far, he considered that the future held no guarantees for their safety. He and 8 of his family members, mostly children, escaped via Egypt, took a boat from Dalmietta and, close to Malta, drowned along with 500 others, when the vessel was rammed by another smuggler's launch.

== See also ==
- List of Israeli strikes and Palestinian casualties in the 2014 Israel–Gaza conflict
- Children in the Israeli–Palestinian conflict
