= Al Deira Hotel =

Hotel in Gaza, Palestine

- فندق الديرة
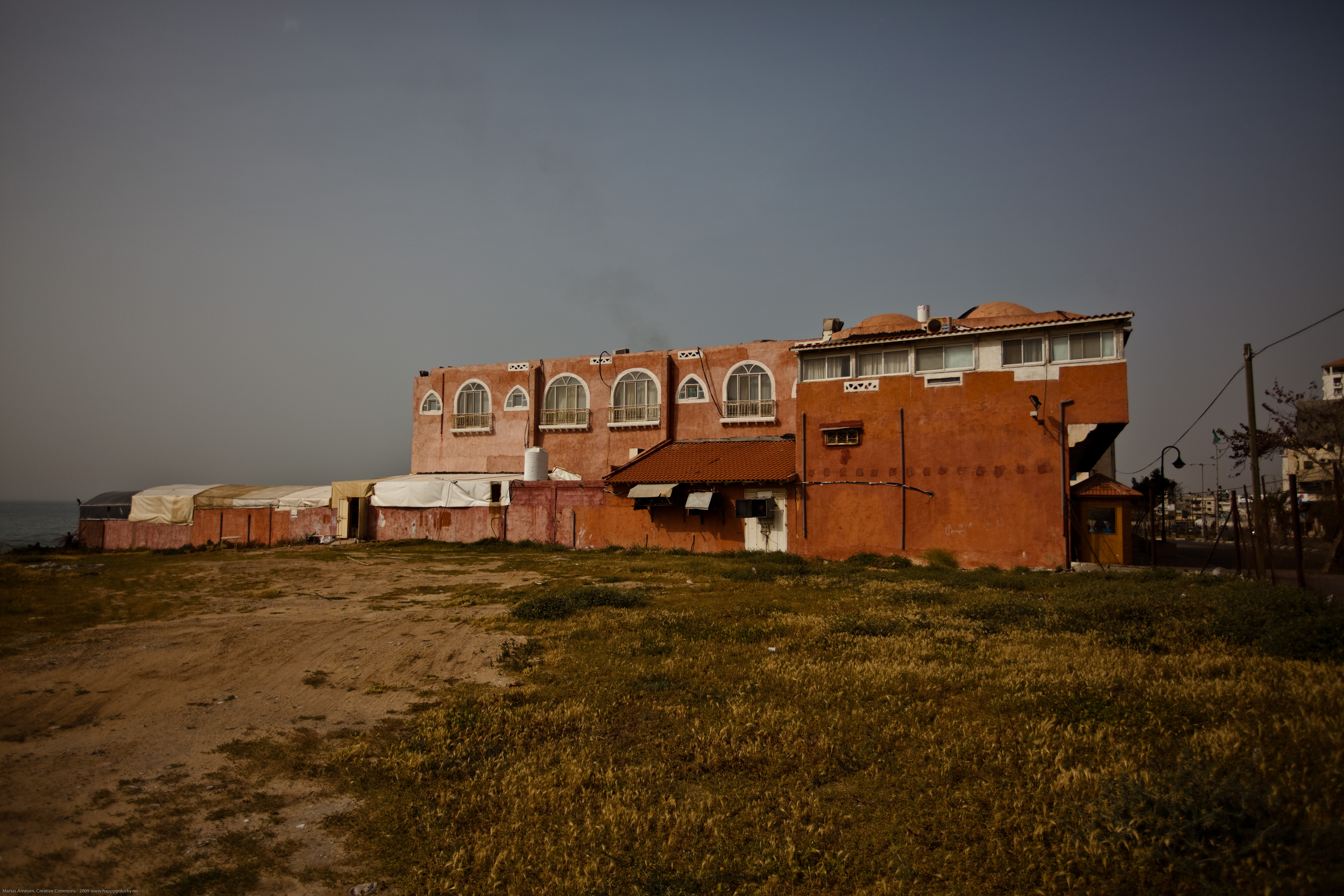
- Al Deira hotel, 2009

- Location within Gaza City

General information
- Status: Destroyed
- Location: Gaza, Palestine
- Coordinates: 31°31′39.0″N 34°26′14.1″E
- Opening: May 2000
- Destroyed: November 2023
- Owner: Alhouseini Family

Technical details
- Floor count: 2

Design and construction
- Architect: Rashid Abdelhamid

Other information
- Number of rooms: 22

The Al Deira Hotel (Arabic: فندق الديرة, romanized: Funduq ad-Dayra) was a beach hotel located on Al-Rashid Street in Gaza, Palestine. It was built in 2000 and was known for its high, domed ceilings and views of the Mediterranean. Al Deira was regularly used by foreign journalists covering Gaza. It was destroyed by the Israeli military in November 2023, during the Gaza war.

== Description ==
Al Deira was a boutique hotel with 22 rooms and built around an inner courtyard. Its architecture was said to have an "Ottoman elegance". The style blended traditional Moroccan and Islamic architecture with modern design influences. It was built with dark brown sun-dried adobe bricks and featured white arches, vaulted and domed ceilings, and handmade furniture, including wicker furniture. The architect was Rashid Abdelhamid.

It had a generator on the property and 5,000 liters of fuel in storage, which kept it open through frequent blackouts due to the war with the Israeli military. For many years, it was considered a "no-hit zone" for the Israeli military, partly due to the presence of foreign journalists, diplomats, and aid workers who were staying at the hotel.

== History ==
The hotel opened in May 2000, not long after the Oslo Accords were signed and a few months before the start of the Second Intifada. It was previously owned by UNDP employee Khaled Abdel Shafi and architect Rashid Abdelhamid. In 2015, new management took over. Samir Skaik became the general manager of the hotel in 2002 and remained in the position until at least 2010.

In 2010, UN Goodwill Ambassadors Mia Farrow and Mahmoud Kabil visited the hotel. Desmond Tutu and Richard Goldstone also visited in 2010.

Al Deira stopped offering alcohol in the mid-2000s, after some protest from the local community.

On July 16, 2014, four children were killed by Israeli rockets whilst playing football on the beach just outside Al Deira Hotel and another was critically injured. Several foreign journalists were staying at the hotel and witnessed the shelling. The hotel staff and some of the journalists helped bring the injured children into the hotel and provided first aid. The following day, all of the journalists had to evacuate the hotel when they received a 30-minute evacuation order from the Israeli military.

=== Gaza war ===
In late 2023 and early 2024, during the Gaza war, the Al Deira Hotel was bombed and destroyed by Israeli forces. Two months later, musician Saint Levant, who is the son of the hotel's architect and former owner, paid homage to the venue in his single "Deira" (featuring MC Abdul), contained in the eponymous debut album Deira released the following June.

== Reception and impact ==
The hotel received multiple positive reviews in Time magazine, by British journalist Alan Johnston, and by Lonely Planet, which described the Al Deira as "swish, stylish and tightly run", and "without question the best hotel in town".

Phoebe Greenwood's 2025 novel Vulture is largely set in a fictional Gaza City hotel called The Beach. Greenwood said that it was a "reimagined" version of Al Deira, and has also said she stayed at Al Deira multiple times to report on Gaza, including during Operation Pillar of Defence. Joshua Hammer, who stayed at Al Deira in the 2000s, called The Beach "an unmistakable stand-in for Al Deira."

== Gallery ==
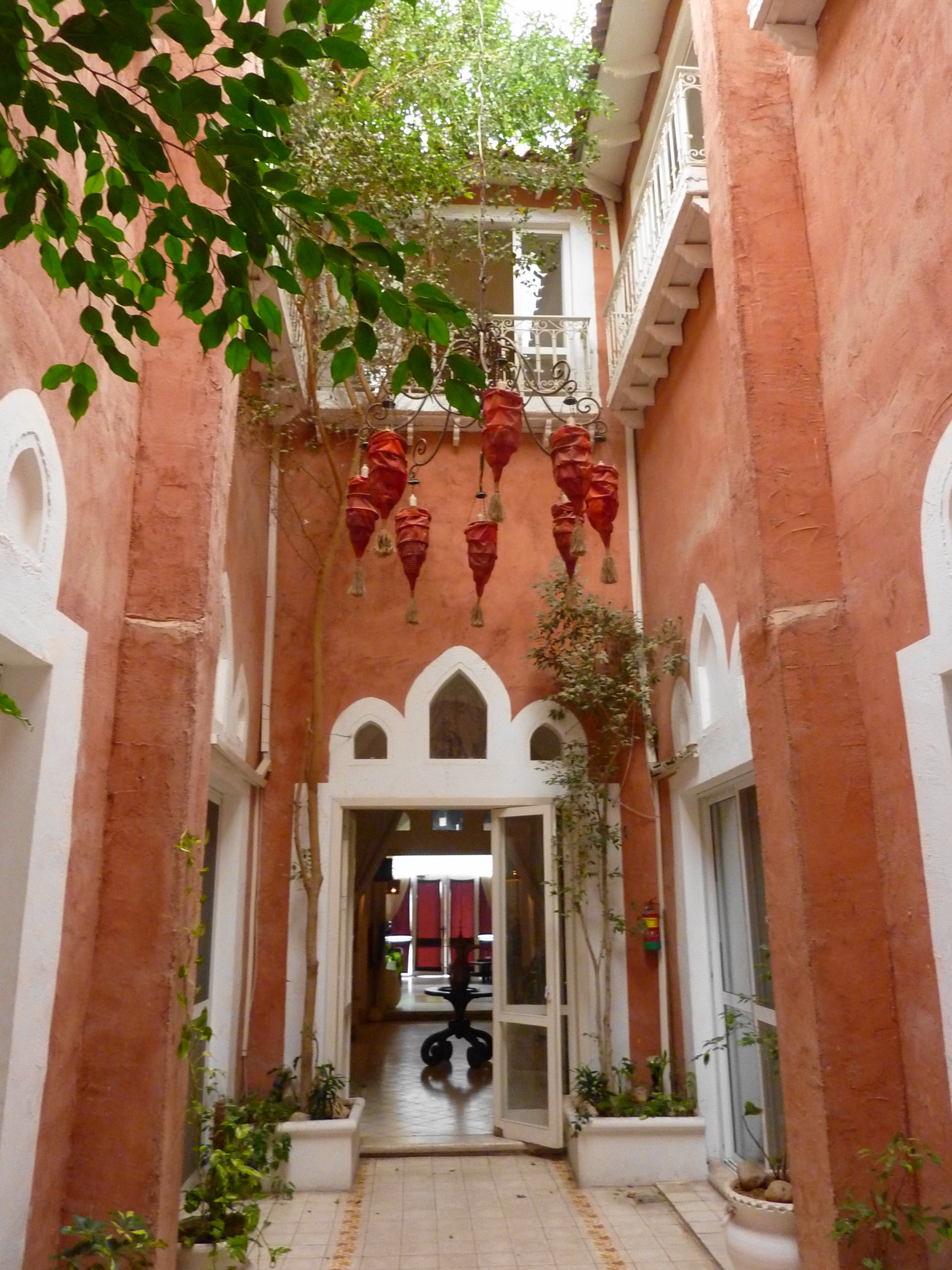
Courtyard, 2011

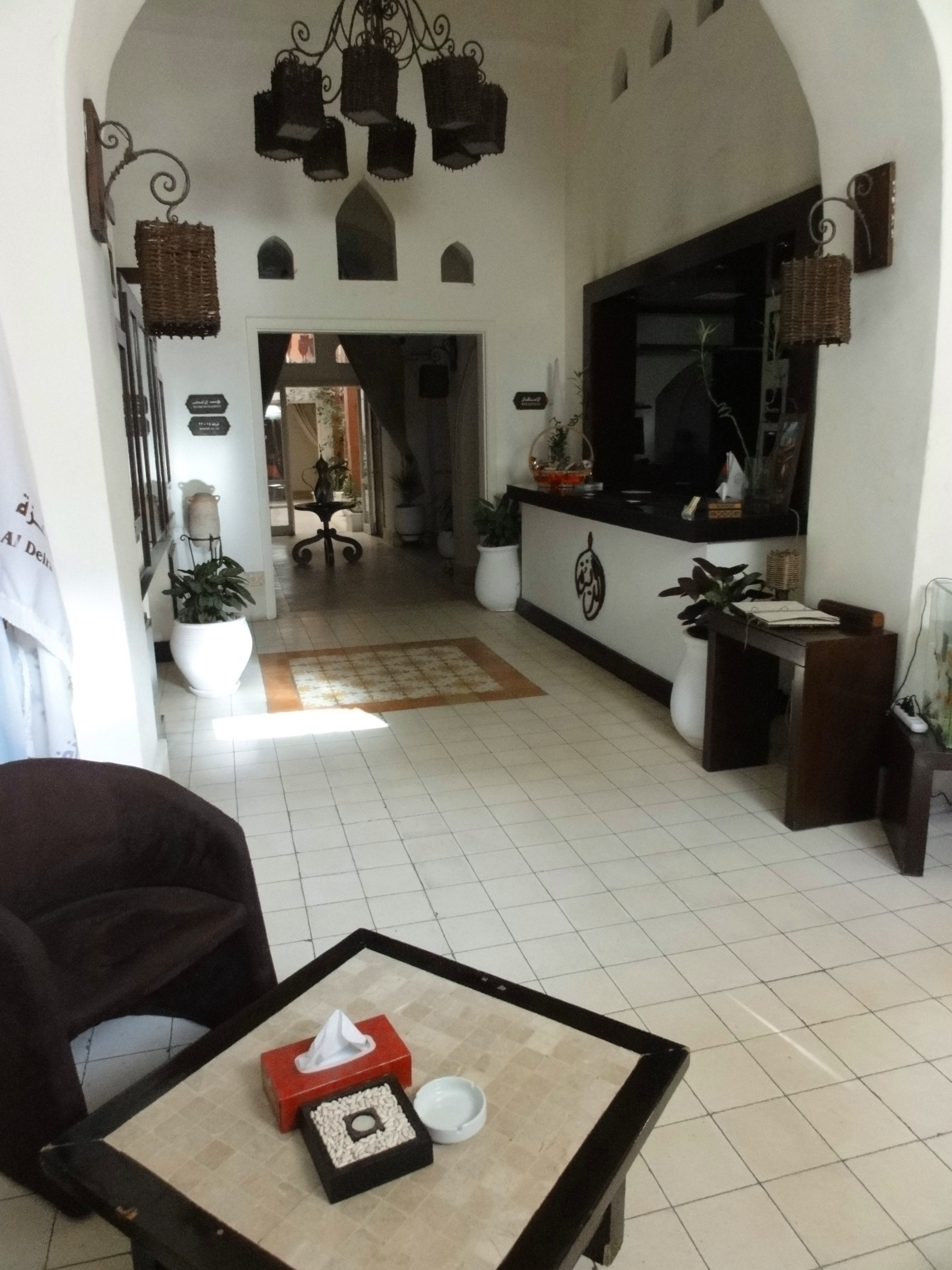
Lobby, 2011

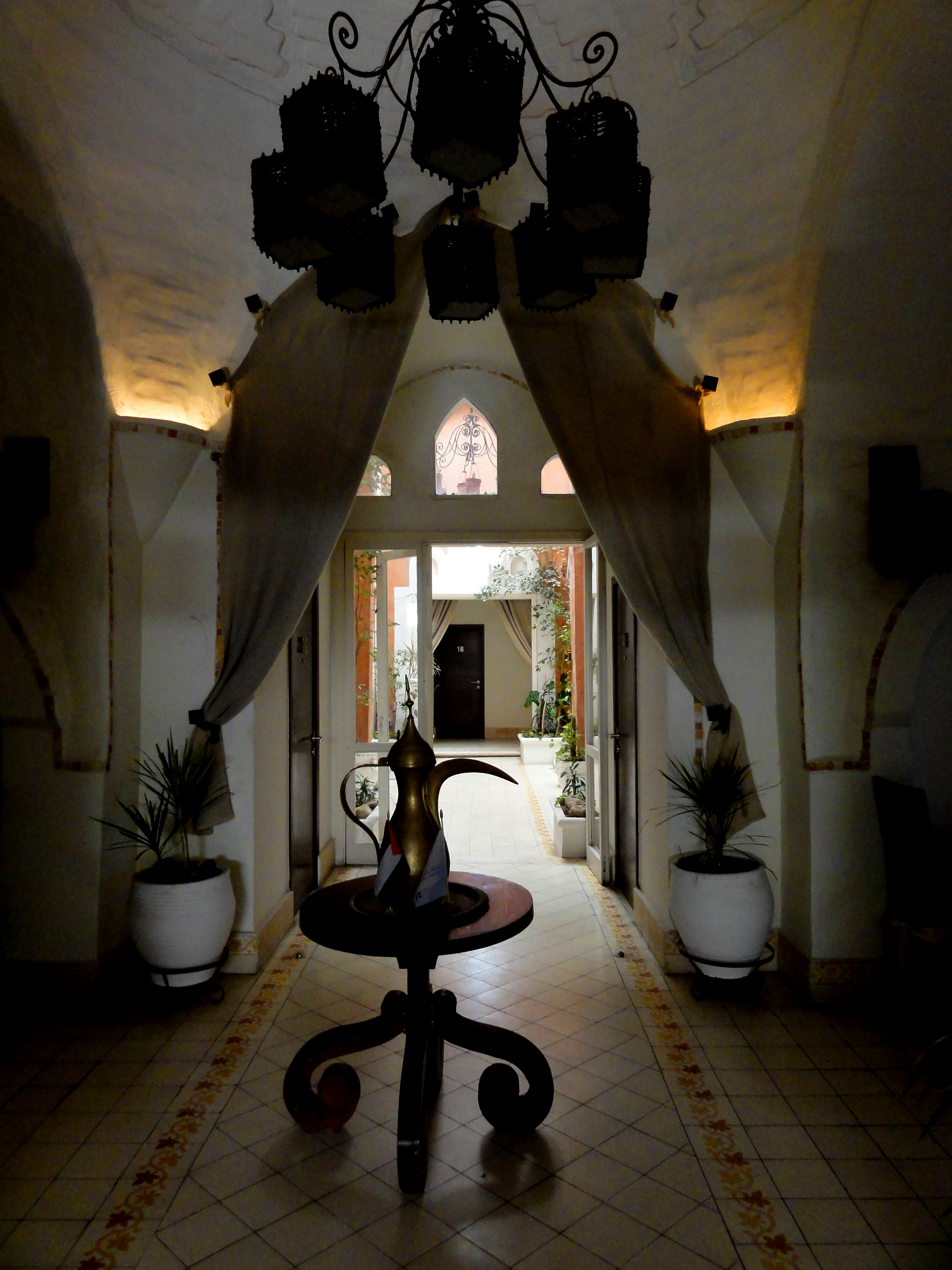
Interior with table, chandelier, and curtains; 2011

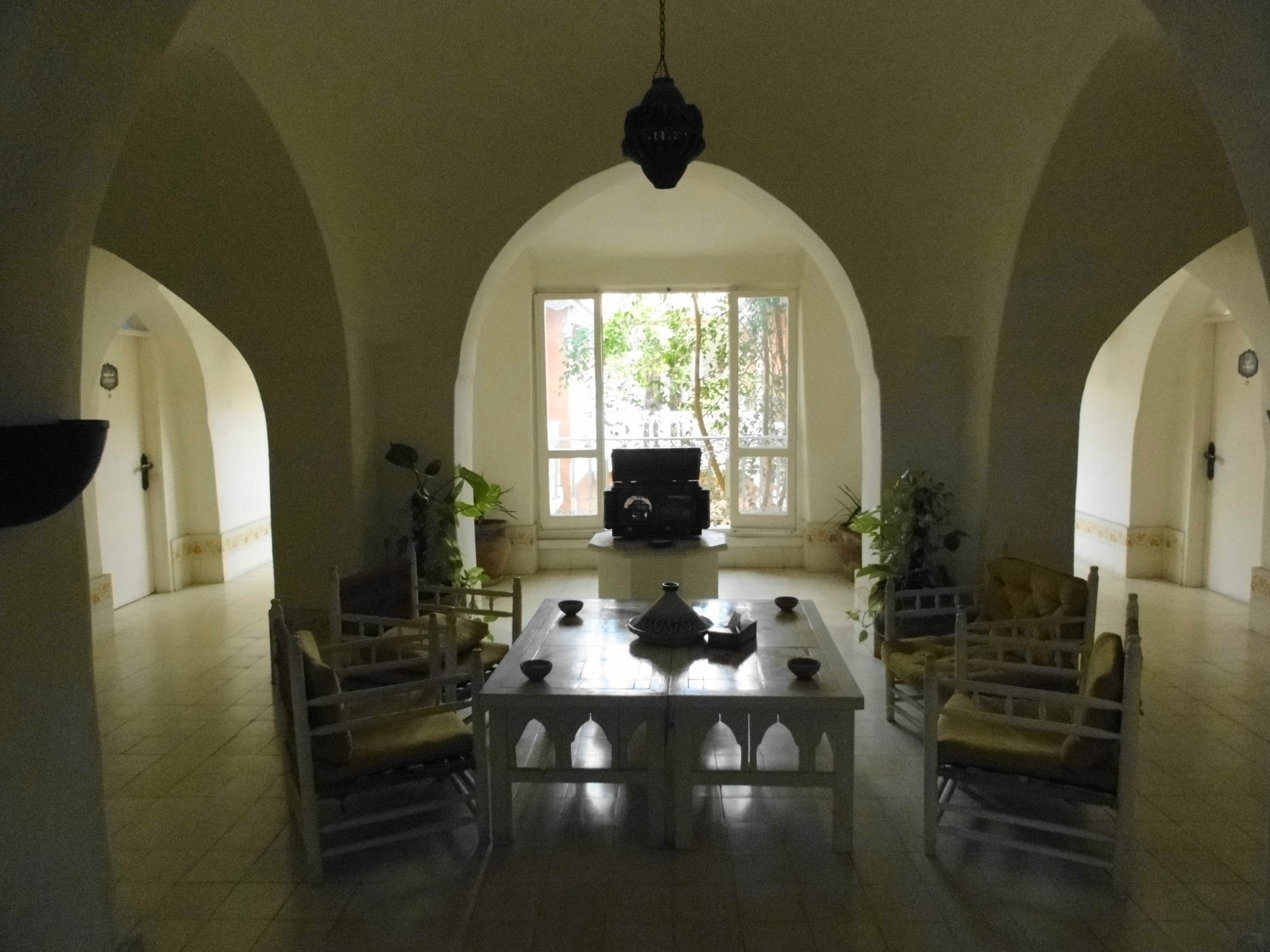
Interior, 2011

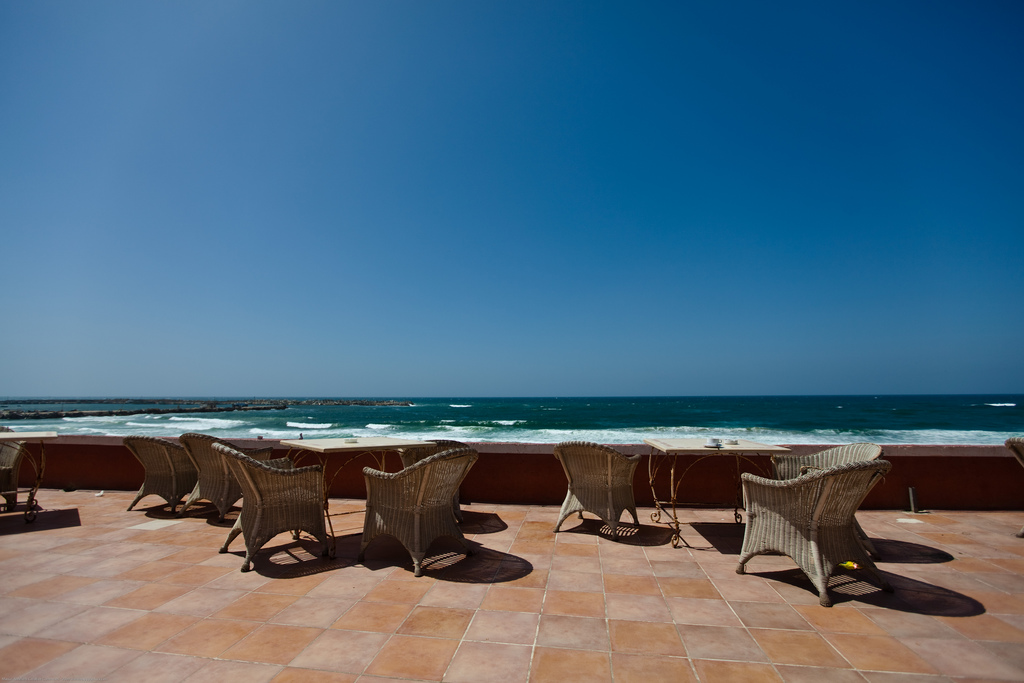
View of the sea from the hotel, 2009

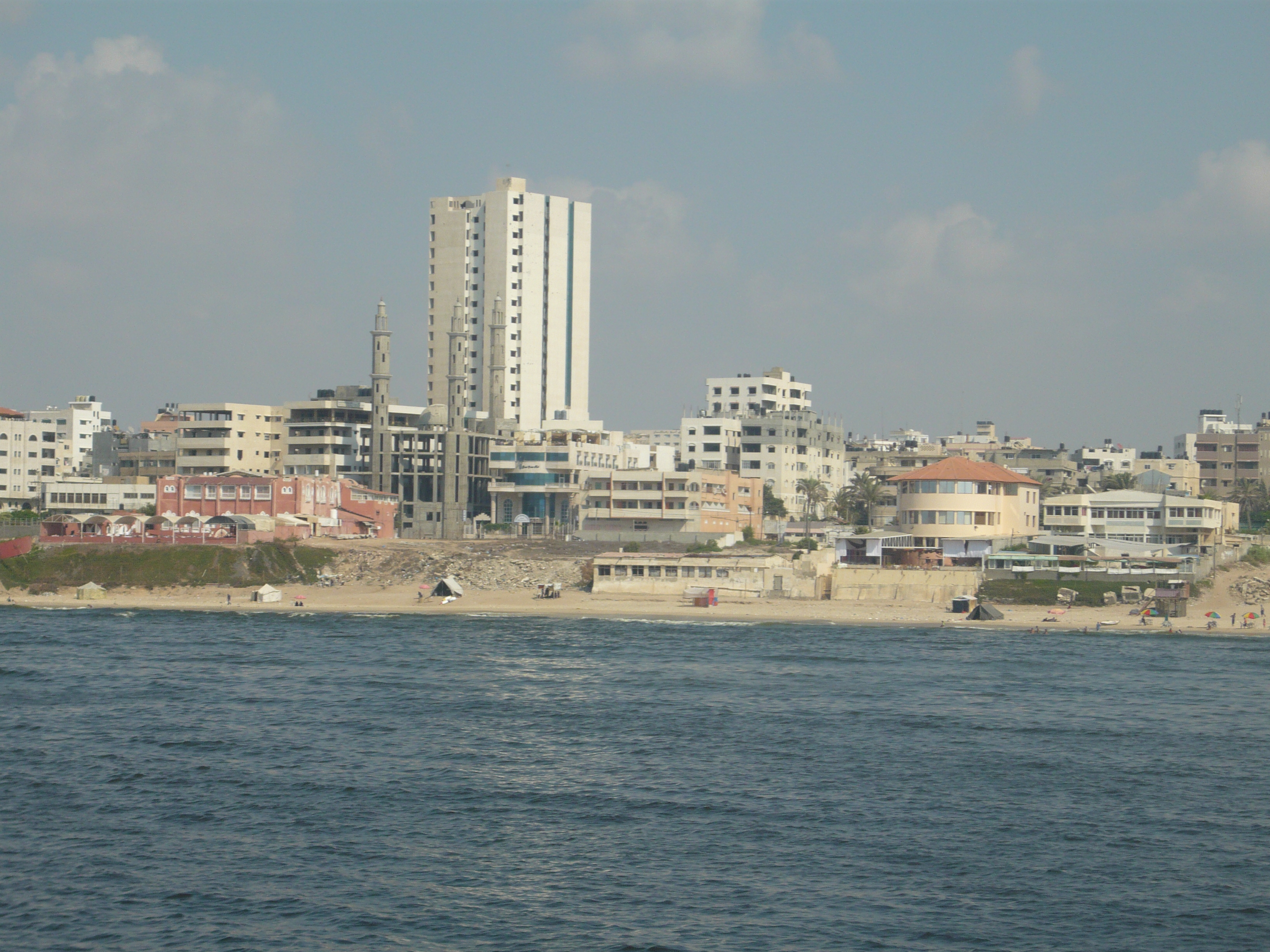
View of the Gaza shoreline with Al Deira on the left, 2009

== See also ==
- Economy of the Gaza Strip
- List of hotels in Palestine
- Tourism in Palestine
