= Verride Palace =

Coordinates: 38.7098°N 9.1470°W

Verride Palace Palace of Santa Catarina
- Palácio de Verride; Palácio de Santa Catarina (Portuguese)
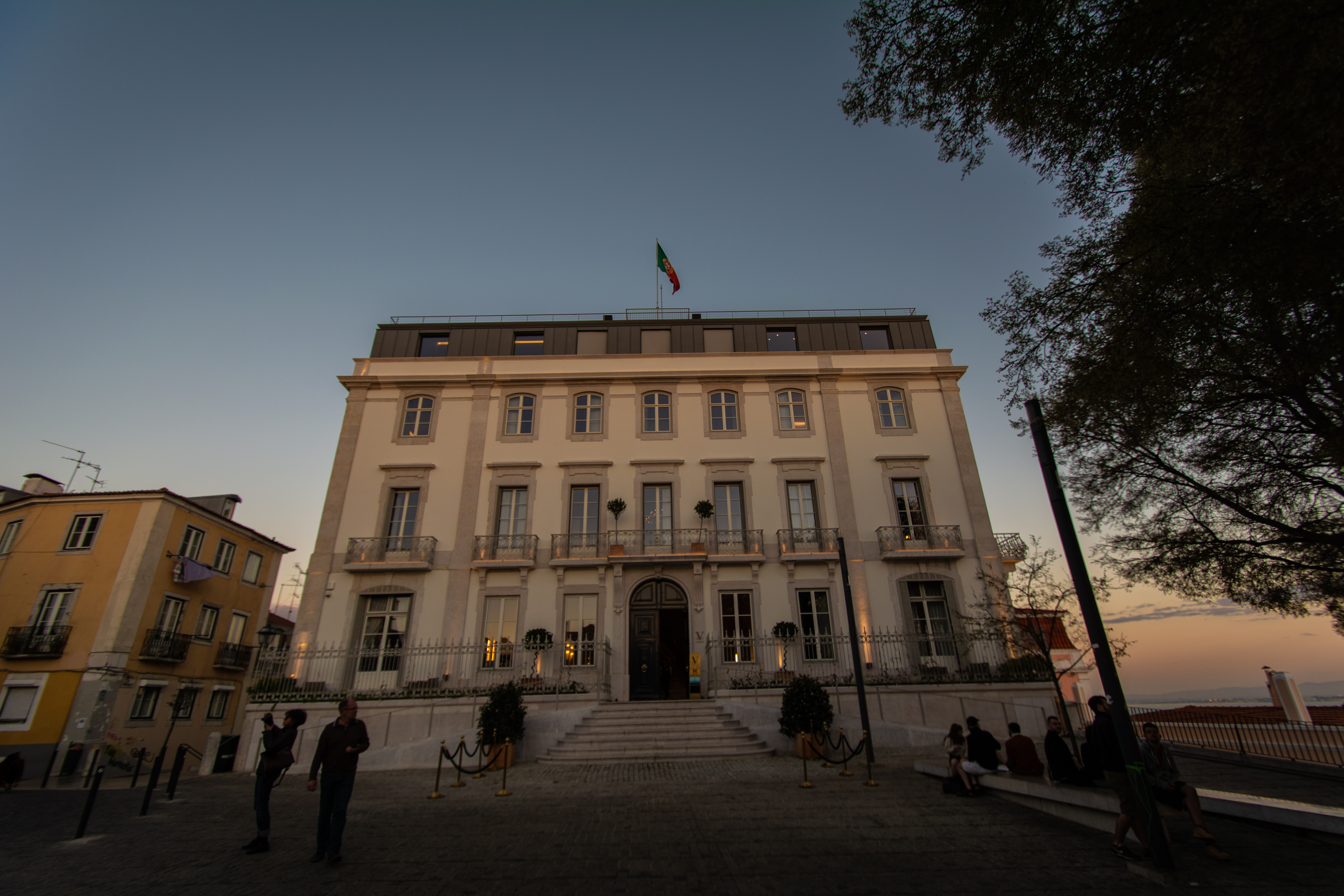
- Verride Palace

- Location within Portugal
- Location: Lisbon, Portugal

Verride Palace, or the Palace of Santa Catarina, (Portuguese: Palácio de Verride; Palácio de Santa Catarina) is an 18th-century Portuguese palace located in Lisbon, Portugal.

== History ==
Located in the Santa Catarina parish in Lisbon, the palace was built in the 18th century.

In 2003, the palace was acquired for its architecture.

In 2010, the palace became the seat of POP UP LISBOA 2010, an urban artistic movement.

In December 2017, the former palace made its debut as a newly restored, ultra-chic, 19-room boutique hotel called Verride Palacio de Santa Catarina, in which there's a rooftop bar and gastropub overlooking the Tagus, a swimming pool and a restaurant, Criatura.

== Sources ==
- Former Palace Santa Catarina Lisbon: history, art gallery, international ‘Pop Up’ festival & popular viewpoint Adamastor near the Tagus River
- Câmara de Lisboa desiste de Santa Catarina e procura novo espaço para Museu do Design (In Portuguese)
- POP UP LISBOA 2010 OCUPA PALÁCIO VERRIDE (In Portuguese)
- Pop Up Lisboa 2010 (In Portuguese)
