= Roof knocking =

Israel Defense Forces practice

Roof knocking (Hebrew: הקש בגג) or "knock on the roof" is a term used by the Israel Defense Forces (IDF) to describe its practice of dropping low-yield devices on the roofs of targeted civilian homes in the occupied Palestinian territories as a prior warning of imminent bombing attacks to give the inhabitants time to flee the attack. The practice was employed by the IDF during the 2008–2009 Gaza War, the 2012 Gaza War, the 2014 Gaza War, and the since 2023 ongoing Gaza War to attack a variety of targets.

The application of roof knocking is often argued to only have legal reasons rather than the intention to reduce civilian casualties. The impact of the smaller device often puts the civilian population in a state of shock, making them unable to flee the larger attack which often follows only 45 to 180 seconds later. According to the IDF, this period must be very short as otherwise targeted weapons could be removed, however, in practice the period proves to be too short for civilians to flee. Civilian casualties after a "knock on the roof" are often considered human shields by Israel, without differentiating between voluntary and involuntary human shields.

== History ==
As early as 2006 the IDF had the practice of warning the inhabitants of a building that was about to be attacked. Roof knocking was used during the 2008–2009 Gaza War, the 2012 Israeli operation in the Gaza Strip, and the 2014 Gaza War. In the six months prior to its use, Israel collected data on Hamas members, which they used to issue warnings. Typically, Israeli intelligence officers and Shin Bet security servicemen contacted residents of a building in which they suspected storage of military assets and told them that they had 10–15 minutes to flee the attack, although in some cases the delay has been as little as five minutes.

=== Adoption by the U.S. military ===
In 2016, it was published that the US military adopted the Israeli battlefield tactic in its war against Islamic State. It was used in an attack against an ISIS storage facility in Mosul, Iraq. As women and children lived in the house, a Hellfire missile was initially shot at the roof as a warning.

=== Gaza war ===
During the Gaza war, CNN reported that many people in Gaza said the IDF had abandoned the "roof knocking" policy. In October 2023, a senior Israeli official stated that the practice would no longer be the norm and would only be used under certain circumstances. An IDF officer told The New York Times that instead of the "roof knocking" policy, Israel is issuing mass evacuation orders and leaflets stating that "anyone who is near Hamas fighters will put their lives in danger."

== Defiance ==
In some cases, residents who were warned about an impending bombing climbed up voluntarily to their roofs to show they would not leave. When Nizar Rayan, a top Hamas military commander, was warned but did not leave his home, he and his family of 15 were killed in the subsequent bombing. When faced with similar situations, IDF commanders have either bombed, called off the bombing or launched a warning missile at empty areas of the roof, in order to frighten the people gathered on the roof into leaving the building.

The New York Times stated that according to Israel, Hamas asked residents to stand on the roofs of buildings to dissuade Israeli pilots from attacking their homes. A NATO report confirmed the practice, describing it as an example of lawfare. However, Amnesty International argued that Hamas's purported call may have been "motivated by a desire to avoid further panic" among civilians, considering both the lack of shelters in Gaza and the fact that some civilians who heeded the IDF's warnings had been casualties of Israeli attacks. Many reporters, including from the BBC, The Independent, and The Guardian have said that they have found no evidence of Hamas forcing Palestinians to stay and become unwilling human shields.

== Reactions ==
The practice has been controversial, as many human rights and news organizations have shown that 'roof knocks' have killed and injured civilians. In July 2014, Amnesty International called for a United Nations investigation into what it alleged were war crimes committed by Israeli fighters, and Philip Luther, Middle East and North Africa Programme Director for the organization, condemned the practice. The spokesperson for Gaza Health Ministry indicated that the same missiles used to give warnings are also used in assassinations, resulting in dozens of casualties and deaths where "remains were scattered, making it impossible to identify them immediately".

The Goldstone Report commented that civilians inside their homes "cannot be expected to know whether a small explosion is a warning of an impending attack or part of an actual attack". It stated that the practice is not an effective advance warning, and is instead likely to "cause terror and confuse the affected civilians".

The Israeli Government stated "While these warnings, could not eliminate all harm to civilians, they were frequently effective," and that aerial video surveillance by IDF forces showed civilians departing from targeted areas prior to an attack as a direct result of the warnings. According to the Israeli army, striking homes suspected of storing weapons, when sufficient warning is given to the residents, falls within the boundaries of international law and is legitimate. In November 2014, the most senior US military official, General Martin Dempsey, cited "roof knocking" as an example where Israel "did some extraordinary things to limit civilian casualties" during the 2014 Gaza War.

Salah Abdul Ati, the directory of the Palestinian Independent Commission for Human Rights in Gaza, described the "policy of destroying homes" a war crime and accused Israel of attempting to circumvent international law to avoid accountability.

Marouf Hasian Jr., a professor of communication at the University of Utah, describes the talk of the "beneficent usage" of "knock on roof" tactics as one that "plays well in front of American or Israeli audiences who feel that older Geneva Convention rules are too 'quaint' and too solicitous of the rights of civilians who may be aiding and abetting terrorists, but it infuriates critics who argue that satellite surveillance is being used in discriminatory systems that assume that homes of police officers or Hamas political or military leaders can be 'precisely' targeted to minimize collateral damage".

== See also ==
- Israeli demolition of Palestinian property
- Criticism of Israel
- Israeli war crimes
