= Joshua Hammer =

American journalist and author

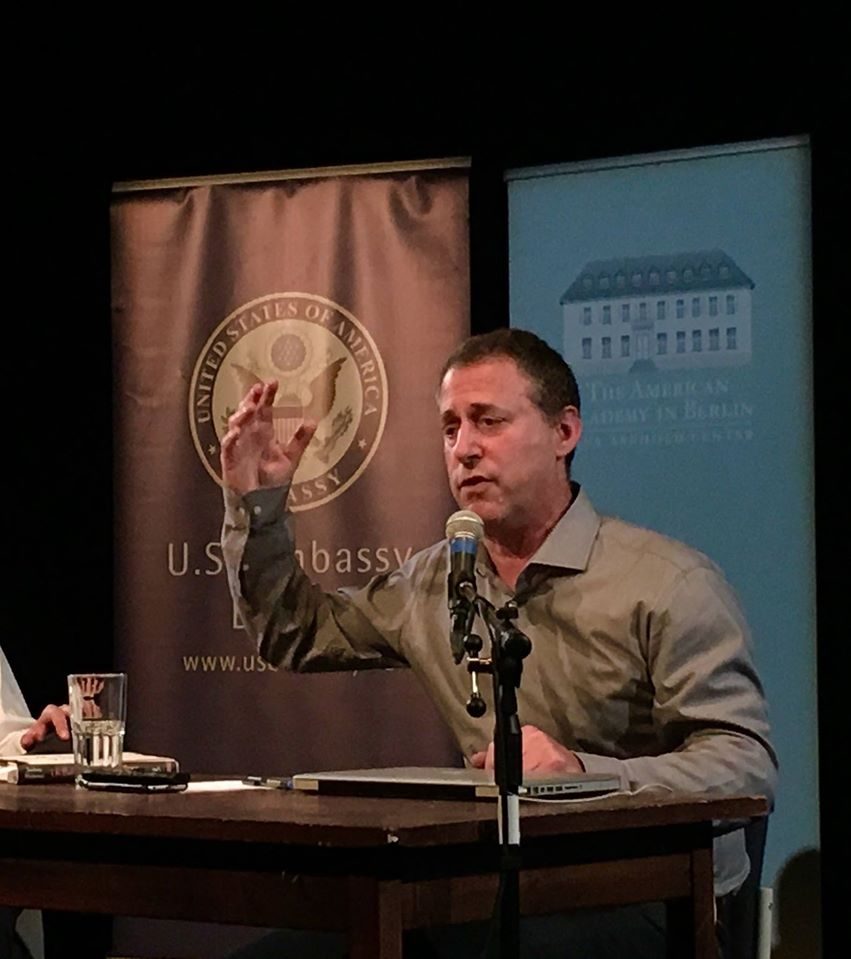
- Born: Joshua Ives Hammer; New York, New York, United States
- Occupations: Journalist, foreign correspondent
- Writing career
- Language: English

Joshua Ives Hammer is an American content creator and freelance foreign correspondent and bureau chief for Newsweek and in Europe. He has also written several books, including the best-selling The Bad-Ass Librarians of Timbuktu in 2016.

== Early life and education ==
Hammer was born to a Jewish family, and attended the Horace Mann School in Riverdale section of The Bronx. He obtained his B.A in English Literature from Princeton University in 1979 where he was Cum Laude.

== Career ==
Hammer has worked as a foreign correspondent.

While at Newsweek he was the Nairobi Bureau Chief from 1993 to 1996, the South American Bureau Chief from 1996 to 1997, the Los Angeles Bureau Chief from 1997 to 2001, the Berlin Bureau Chief from 2000 to 2001, and the Jerusalem Bureau Chief.

His articles have appeared in such publications as The New York Review of Books, The New Yorker and Smithsonian.

== Personal life ==
Hammer and the photographer Gary Knight were kidnapped in the Gaza Strip in 2001.

Hammer has three sons and as of 2013 was residing with his family in Berlin, Germany.

== Bibliography ==
=== Books ===
- Chosen by God : a brother's journey. New York: Hyperion. 1999.
- A season in Bethlehem : unholy war in a sacred place. 2003.
- Yokohama Burning: The Deadly 1923 Earthquake and Fire that Helped Forge the Path to World War II, 2006
- The Bad-Ass Librarians of Timbuktu, 2016
- The Falcon Thief: A True Tale of Adventure, Treachery, and the Hunt for the Perfect Bird, 2020
- The Mesopotamian Riddle: An Archaeologist, a Soldier, a Clergyman, and the Race to Decipher the World's Oldest Writing, 2025

=== Articles ===
- "Frenemies of state : fear and loathing in Zimbabwe's shaky unity government". Dispatches. Politics. The Atlantic. 304 (5): 23–24. December 2009.
- "The contenders : is Egypt's Presidential race becoming a real contest?". Letter from Cairo. The New Yorker. 86 (8): 28–34. April 5, 2010.
- "Rio revolution". Smithsonian. 43 (9): 44–53. January 2013.
- "How do You Solve a Problem Like Amazon?" American Affairs (August 2021)
