= Huancayo Metro =

Railway project in Peru

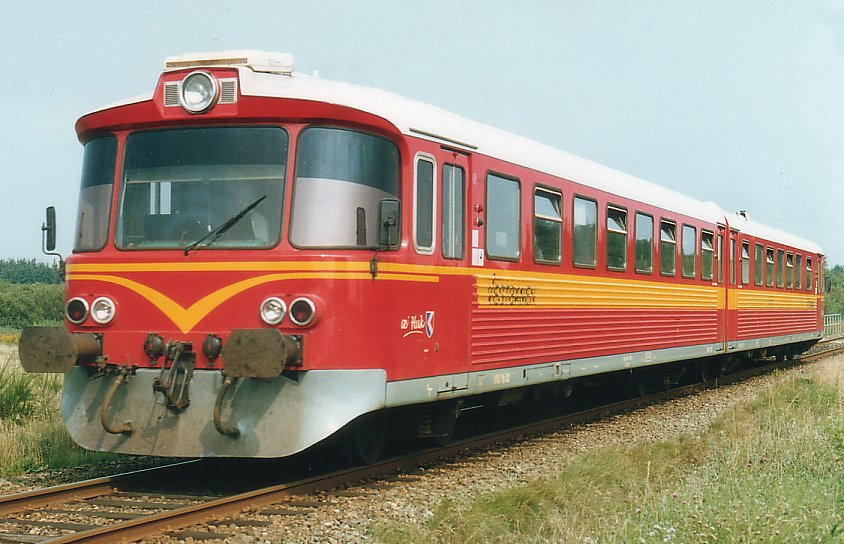
Model of train that will be used in Huancayo Metro

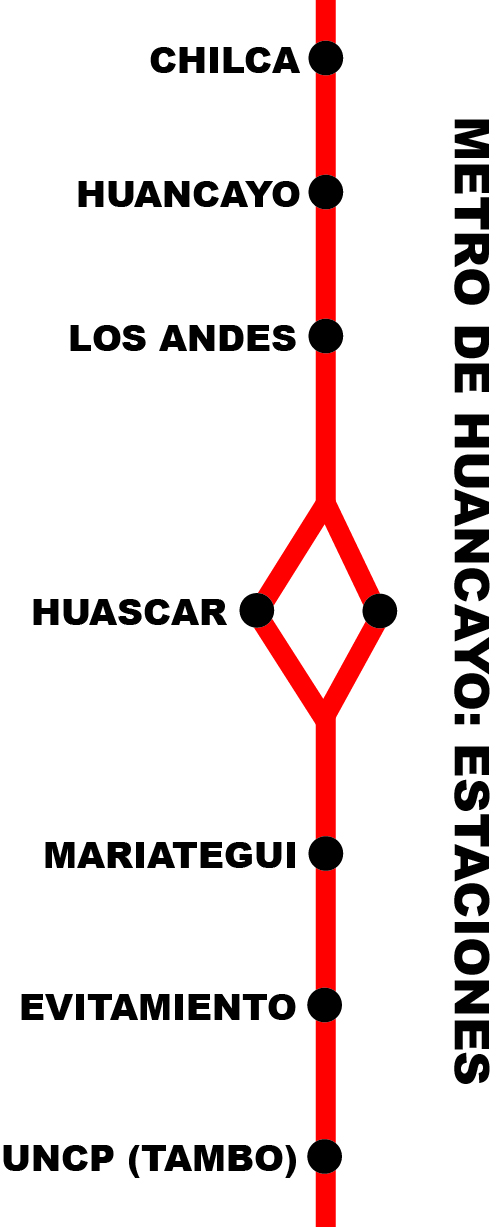
Huancayo Metro map

The Huancayo Metro or Wanka Metro is a failed metropolitan railway project which was to be the second metro line in Peru, after Lima Metro. It was constructed by the company Ferrocarril Central Andino in the city of Huancayo in the Central Andes of Peru. Its operation was planned for the first half of 2013, as announced in October 2012, however the railway never opened.

It was to be an urban rail with an initial length of 7 km. communicating Chilca area, the center of the city of Huancayo and Tambo, with seven stations and seven crossings along the old FCCA line. For the second stage, it was expected to connect Huancayo, with Jauja, a stretch of nearly 42 km.

== History ==
The project was announced in July 2012, defining the route and the works to be performed.

On 20 October there was an announcement by the mayor Dimas Aliaga, that it would open in March 2013 and that six rail cars had been acquired by Ferrocarril Central Andino and delivered to the port of Callao. Each carriage has a capacity of 150 people and by using 2 carriages together each train can carry 300 people.

On 14 November the new trains were expected to be presented at the station Monserrate, in the city of Lima.

In May 2013, it was announced that further funding from central government was required to build a fence along the railway for reasons of safety.

In August 2013, it was reported that work had stopped and the trains would likely be transferred to another city.

== Stations ==
The Huancayo Metro, in urban areas, would have comprised the following stations (direction is south to north):

- Chilca (FCCA Station)
- Huancayo Station
- The Andes
- Huascar
- Mariátegui
- Evitamiento
- UNCP (Tambo)

== See also ==
- Huancayo-Huancavelica Railway
- Rail transport in Peru
- Transport in Peru
- Arequipa Monorail
