= Bulnes El Litral Airport =

El Litral Airport
- IATA: none; ICAO: SCUL

Summary
- Airport type: Public
- Serves: Bulnes, Chile
- Elevation AMSL: 180 ft / 55 m
- Coordinates: 36°47′40″S 72°25′04″W

Map
- Location of El Litral Airport in Chile

Runways
Direction	Length		Surface
Direction	m	ft	Surface
17/35	995	3,264	Asphalt
- Source: Landings.com Google Maps GCM

El Litral Airport (Spanish: Aeropuerto de El Litral, (ICAO: SCUL) is an airport 7 kilometres (4.3 mi) southeast of Quillón, a city in Ñuble Region of Chile. It is 12 kilometres (7.5 mi) southwest of Bulnes.

The runway has an additional 390 metres (1,280 ft) of unpaved overrun on the south end. The north end has an additional 110 metres (360 ft) available.

The Chillan VOR-DME (Ident: CHI) is located 22.4 nautical miles (41.5 km) northeast of the airport.

== See also ==
- Transport in Chile
- List of airports in Chile
- Bulnes Rucamelen Airport
