= Bulnes Rucamelen Airport =

Rucamelen Airport
- IATA: none; ICAO: SCUR

Summary
- Airport type: Closed
- Serves: Bulnes, Chile
- Elevation AMSL: 475 ft / 145 m
- Coordinates: 36°48′35″S 72°10′00″W

Map
- Location of Rucamelen Airport in Chile

Runways
Direction	Length		Surface
Direction	ft	m	Surface
Closed
- Source: Landings.com

Rucamelen Airport Spanish: Aeropuerto de Rucamelen, (ICAO: SCUR) was a rural airstrip 14 kilometres (8.7 mi) east of Bulnes, a town in the Bío Bío Region of Chile.

Google Earth Historical Imagery (3/9/2015) shows a well marked 792 metres (2,598 ft) grass runway. The (11/13/2015) and subsequent imagery show the runway area divided into three separate fields, plowed, and cropped.

== See also ==
- Transport in Chile
- List of airports in Chile
- Bulnes El Litral Airport
