= APZ =

APZ may refer to:

- APZ, the dual processor system of the AXE telephone exchange
- Area Planning Zones in the Bangalore Metropolitan Region Development Authority
- IATA airport code for Zapala Airport
- Asoziale Parasiten-Zonen, in the Anarchist Pogo Party of Germany
- Asia Pacific Zone of the International Wine and Food Society
- Async Pan and Zoom function of Firefox OS
- APZ (Abnormal Mental States) questionnaire, a psychometric scale for assessing subjective experiences of altered states of consciousness
