= Trans-Andean railways =

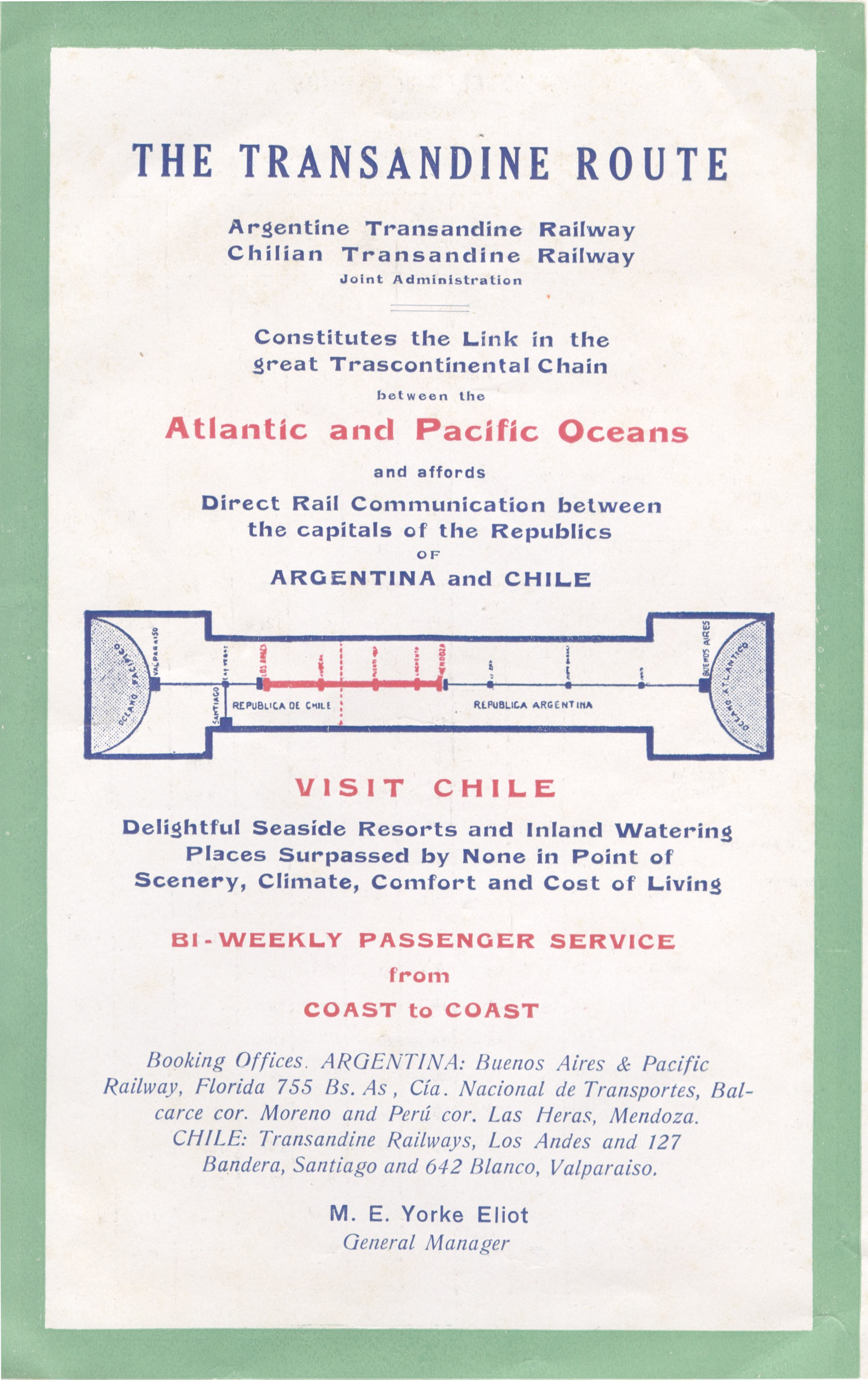
Advertisement from Traveller's Guide to the Argentine (Guia del Viajero a la Argentina) number 13, July–December 1932, page 42, inside rear cover

The Trans-Andean railways provides rail transport over the Andes. Several are either planned, built, defunct, or waiting to be restored. They are listed here in order from north to south.

== Colombian Railways ==
- Feb 2011 - The Chinese Government plans to cooperate with Colombia in building a 220 km transcontinental railway which would link Colombia's Atlantic and Pacific coasts, according to a British newspaper.

== Ecuador Trans-Andean Railway ==
Much of Ecuador's Trans-Andean Railway (a railway network that once ran from Guayaquil to Quito) has been rendered useless by natural disasters. Torrential rains from the 1982–83 and 1997-98 El Niño caused massive landslides that damaged the railway line. The network is operated by Empresa de Ferrocarriles Ecuatorianos. Only three sections remain operational: a 60-kilometre (37 mi) segment connecting Quito and Cotopaxi National Park, a 43.5-kilometre (27 mi) stretch between Ibarra and Primer Paso, and the mountainous five-hour, 100 km (62 mi) excursion from Riobamba to Sibambe.

== Peru ==
Although wholly within Peru, the Ferrocarril Central Andino (FCCA; the former Ferrocarril Central del Perú) running inland from Callao and Lima crosses the Andes watershed at Galera en route to La Oroya and Huancayo. From here the route is extended by the Ferrocarril Huancayo - Huancavelica. In July 2006 FCCA began work to regauge the Huancavelica line from 914 mm (3 ft) to 1,435 mm (4 ft 8 1/2 in) (standard gauge). There was also a proposal for a 21 km (13 mi) tunnel under the Andes.

The Ferrocarriles del Sur del Perú (FCS), now operated by PeruRail, runs from the coast at Matarani to Cuzco, and to Puno on Lake Titicaca from where steamers and train ferries have been run connecting with Guaqui in Bolivia.

== Proposed Bolivia-Chile Trans-Andean railway ==
Empresa Nacional de Ferrocarriles - ENFE, operator of the National Railways of Bolivia, and consultant Hagler Bailly, United States, have signed a contract to undertake an economic feasibility study into the proposed $US 1 billion 338 km Aiquile–Santa Cruz Railway (IRJ July p6). The line would connect the Eastern Railway network with the Andean Railway network, and effectively create a new trans-Andean railway from Pacific Ocean ports in Chile to the port of Santos in Brazil.

Other Bolivia-Chile railways:

- Ferrocarril de Antofagasta a Bolivia
- Arica–La Paz railway, Arica, Chile–La Paz

== Proposed Peru - Brazil Railway ==
In 2014, proposals were advanced by ProInversión for the above railway.

- Ucayali - western Brazil
- Huánuco - Peru
- Pasco - Peru
- San Martin - Peru
- Amazonas - Brazil
- Cajamarca - Peru
- Piura - Peru - near Pacific coast in north

== Argentina - Chile ==
- (from North)

=== Salta-Antofagasta railway ===
The Huaytiquina railway is a single 1,000 mm (3 ft 3 3/8 in) gauge linking Salta, Argentina, to Antofagasta, Chile. The Tren a las Nubes is a touristic service running for 217 kilometres (135 mi) on the Argentinian side.

=== Transandine Railway ===
The central Transandine Railway from Valparaíso, Chile, to Mendoza, Argentina is defunct, pending reconstruction. While Chile and large parts of Argentina both use the same 1,676 mm (5 ft 6 in) gauge, the connecting Ferrocarril Trasandino Los Andes - Mendoza used a narrow gauge of 1,000 mm (3 ft 3 3/8 in) with rack railway sections. Thus there are two break-of-gauge stations, one at Los Andes, Chile and the other at Mendoza.

In 2009, a deal was signed to build a 1,676 mm (5 ft 6 in), single gauge, base tunnel connecting Chile and Argentina.

=== South Trans-Andean railway ===
- from Lonquimay (Chile) to Zapala (Argentina) – construction abandoned. 220 kilometres (140 mi) line once again proposed in 2005 and work underway at Chilean end in 2005; first stage completed by early 2006. Possible break-of-gauge and rack railway.
- from Osorno, Chile to Bariloche – never built.

== BiOceanio ==
- (2010)
- Brazil - Paraguay - Argentina - Chile
- (Chile) Mejillones
- (Chile) Antofagasta
- (Brazil) Paranaguá
- (Brazil) São Francisco do Sul

== See also ==
- Panama Canal Railway
- Railway stations in Peru
- Track gauge in South America
- Tren a las Nubes
