= Track gauge in South America =

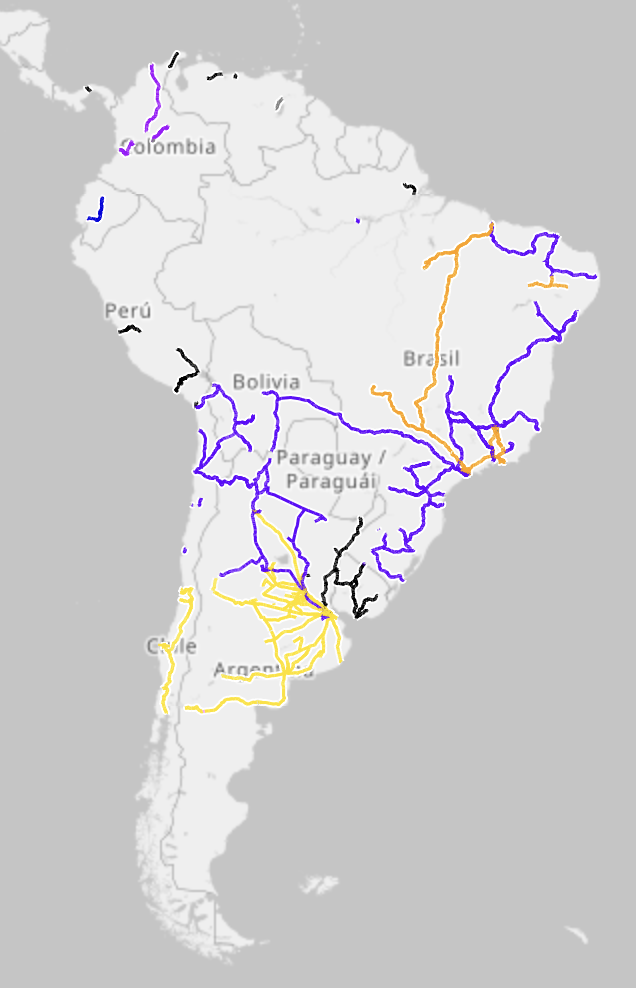
The gauges of major South American railways as of 2023. 3 ft gauge (914 mm) Meter gauge (1,000 mm) 3 ft 6 in gauge (1,067 mm) Standard gauge (1,435 mm) 5 ft 3 in gauge (1,600 mm) 5 ft 6 in gauge (1,676 mm)

In South America, Argentina and Chile use 1,676 mm (5 ft 6 in) track gauge, as well as 1,000 mm (3 ft 3 3/8 in) or metre gauge.

Brazil uses 1,600 mm (5 ft 3 in) (known as "Irish gauge", most common for passenger services and a few corridors in the Southeast) and 1,000 mm (3 ft 3 3/8 in) (known or "metre gauge", most common for cargo services). Exceptions are the Estrada de Ferro do Amapá north of the Amazon River, which has 1,435 mm (4 ft 8 1/2 in) gauge, and the Lines 4 and 5 of São Paulo Metro, which also use standard gauge.

Argentina (partly), Venezuela, Paraguay, Uruguay, and Peru use standard gauge. In the past a few lines in Northern Chile also had standard gauge, as the only international railway between Arica (Chile) and Tacna (Peru), slightly more than 60 km, uses standard gauge. The El Cerrejón Coal Railway in Colombia is also 1,435 mm (4 ft 8 1/2 in).

There are and were also some lines using different narrow gauges; see Narrow-gauge railways in South America.

== See also ==
- Trans-Andean railways
- Rail gauge in Europe
- Rail gauge in North America
