= FCCA =

FCCA may refer to:

- Chartered Certified Accountant, postnominal initials
- Federal Circuit Court of Australia
- Federal Communications Commission Act, otherwise known as the Communications Act of 1934
- Ferrocarril Central Andino, a railway company in Peru
- Ferrocarril Central Argentino, a former railway company in Argentina
- Film Critics Circle of Australia
