= Track gauge in Europe =

Railway Gauges

Most railways in Europe use the standard gauge of 1,435 mm (4 ft 8 1/2 in). Some countries use broad gauge, of which there are three types. Narrow gauges are also in use.

== Broad gauge ==
- Russian and 5 ft gauge
  - 1,520 mm (4 ft 11 27/32 in): former Soviet Union states
  - 1,524 mm (5 ft): Finland and Estonia
  (The difference is within tolerance limits, so it is possible to exchange trains between 1520 mm and 1524 mm networks without changes to the wheelsets, however sometimes issues like stuck rolling stock might occur.)
- Irish gauge
  - 1,600 mm (5 ft 3 in): Republic of Ireland and Northern Ireland
- Iberian gauge
  - 1,668 mm (5 ft 5 21/32 in): Portugal and Spain

== High-speed rail ==
Apart from Russia and Finland, all high-speed rail in Europe uses standard-gauge (1,435 mm (4 ft 8 1/2 in)) tracks.

== See also ==
- Rail gauge in North America
- Rail gauge in South America
- Rail gauge in Australia
