= Tren de la Costa (Peru) =

Overview
- Status: In planning
- Locale: Peru
- Termini: Sullana; Ica

Service
- Type: Regional rail, commuter rail

Technical
- Line length: 323.7 km (201.1 mi)
- Number of tracks: Double track
- Track gauge: 1,435 mm (4 ft 8 1/2 in) standard gauge

The Tren de la Costa is a planned regional rail line in Peru, paralleling the Pan American Highway between the cities of Sullana, Lima, and Ica. The line is estimated to cost $10 billion, and is expected to carry 57 million passengers per year.

== Project ==
In October 2012, Congress declared the line a national priority and invited invitations to tender for the financing, construction, operation and maintenance of the line. Little progress was made until a 2019 announcement from the Peruvian government declaring its intention to fund the line as a public private partnership.

== Route ==
The original plan for a 1,340 km (830 mi) line consisted of eleven trains per day serving the communities of Lima, Ica, Áncash, La Libertad, Lambayeque and Piura, totalling the most populous area of Peru. The first stage of construction will be from Huacho to Ica via Lima, with a commuter rail service planned on the line for the Lima metropolitan area. This section was planned to commence construction in 2019, but a 2020 construction start is now planned on the 323.7 km (201.1 mi) Lima to Ica section. The rail line will provide a three-hour travel time between Lima and Ica, and cost $3.2 billion.

== See also ==
- Rail transport in Peru
