= Luis Candelaria =

Argentine Army officer (1892 – 1963)

Luis Cenobio Candelaria
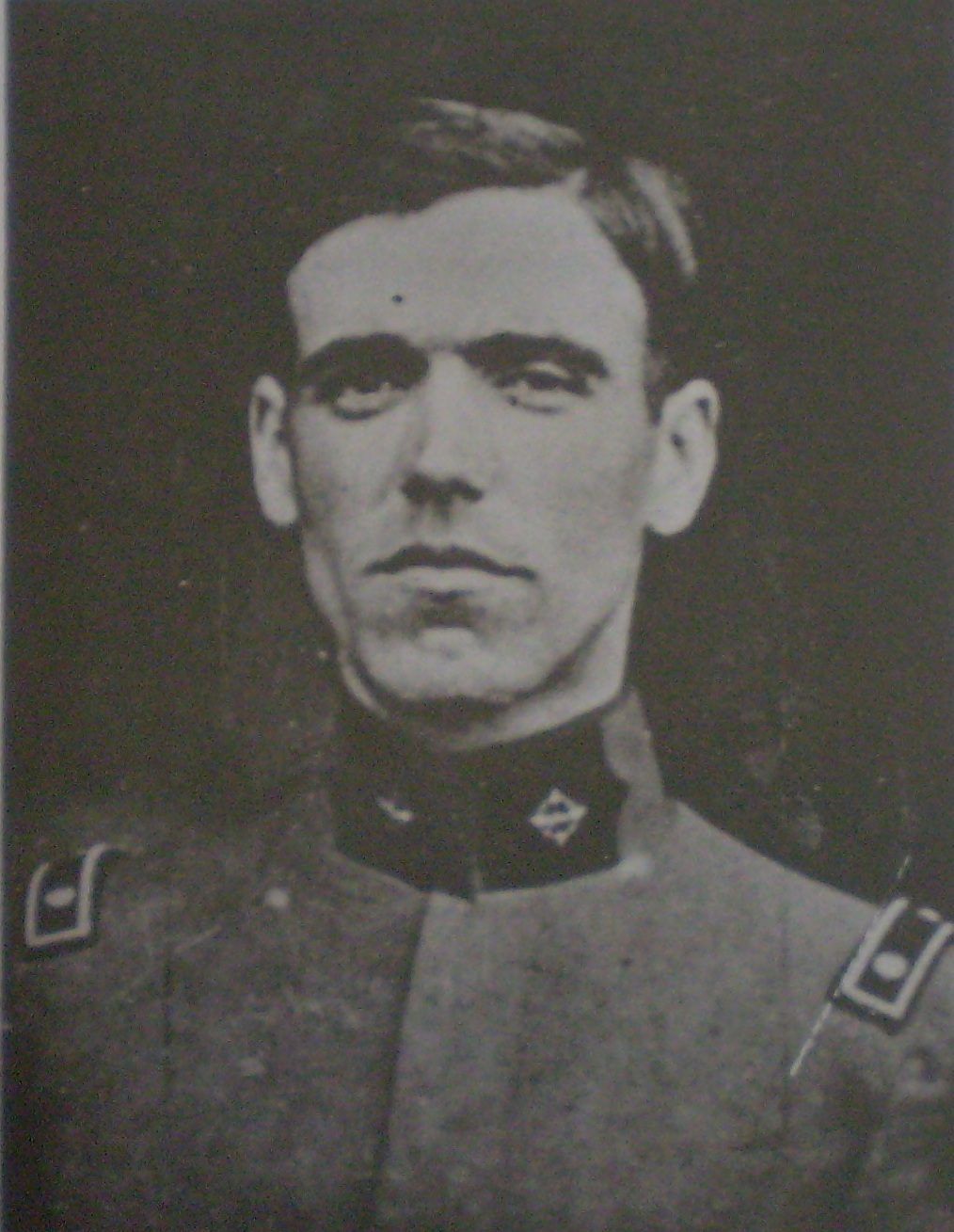
- Lieutenant Luis Candelaria
- Born: October 29, 1892; Buenos Aires Argentina
- Died: December 23, 1963 (aged 71); San Miguel de Tucumán Argentina
- Occupations: Aviator; Arly Officer
- Known for: First crossing of the Andes by aeroplane

Luis Candelaria (29 October 1892 Buenos Aires – 23 December 1963 San Miguel de Tucumán), was an Argentine Army officer and military aviator who was the first to cross the Andes by aeroplane, in April 1918.

== First crossing of the Andes by aeroplane ==
While the Andes were flown over in 1916 using the balloon by Arturo Bradley and Angel María Zuloaga, the attempts to do so by aeroplane by Jorge Newbery (1914) and by Pedro Zanni (1917) were unsuccessful, and in the former case resulted in the death of the pilot.

Lieutenant Candelaria successfully crossed the Andes on 13 April 1918 in a Morane-Saulnier Parasol with an 80 hp rotary engine, taking off from Zapala (Argentina) and landing at Cunco (Chile) after a total flight time of 2 hours 30 minutes during which he reached 4,000 meters of altitude. The Argentine Government granted Candelaria the title of Military Aviator for that feat.

== Luis Candelaria in popular culture ==
- The San Carlos de Bariloche Airport is named Teniente Luis Candelaria, after him.
- A primary school in the city of Zapala, ‘’Escuela Primaria N°3 Teniente Aviador Luis Candelaria’’, is named after him.
- Although he died in San Miguel de Tucumán, Candelaria’s remains are interred at Zapala, as per his wishes; his grave has the inscription "13 de Abril de 1918" ((in Spanish): 13 April 1918).

== See also ==
- History of aviation
- List of firsts in aviation
