= Rail transport in Bolivia =

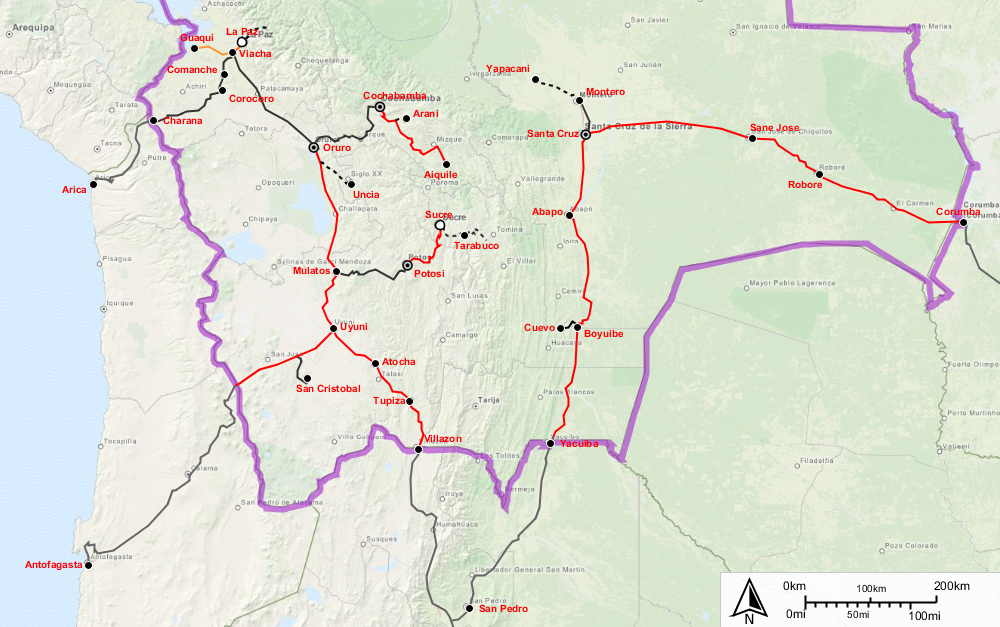
Railways in Bolivia ━━━ Routes with passenger traffic ━━━ Routes in usable state ·········· Unusable or dismantled routes

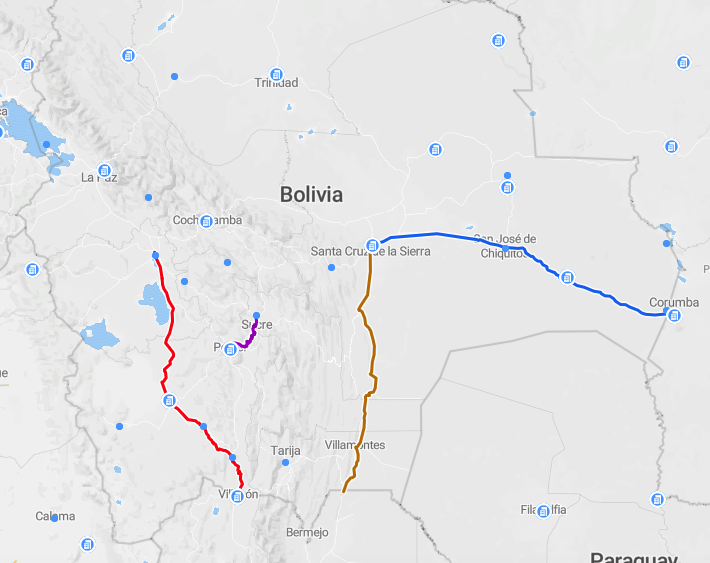
Passenger trains in Bolivia

The Bolivian rail network is made at present of two separate systems, one in the eastern lowlands centered on Santa Cruz and one centered along a north-south axis along Altiplano plateau and with multiple branch lines.

The network has had a varied development throughout its history but contrary to the road system that largelly unified in 1954 with the opening of the Cochabamba–Santa Cruz road the eastern and western rail systems in Bolivia have never joined.

== History ==
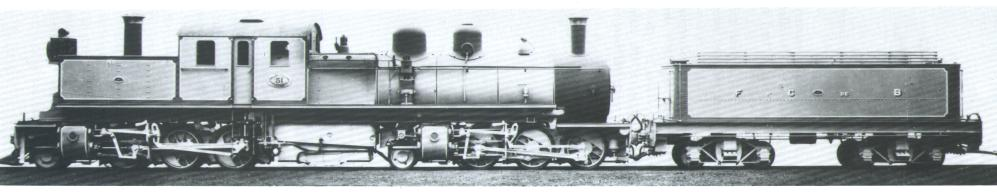
Vintage photo of Kitson– Meyer by Beyer Peacock for the Antofagasta - Bolivia Railroad Company

== Gauges ==
All railways in Bolivia are now 1,000 mm (3 ft 3 3/8 in) Metre gauge. The Antofagasta to Uyuni line was originally 2 ft 6 in (762 mm) gauge.

== Maps ==
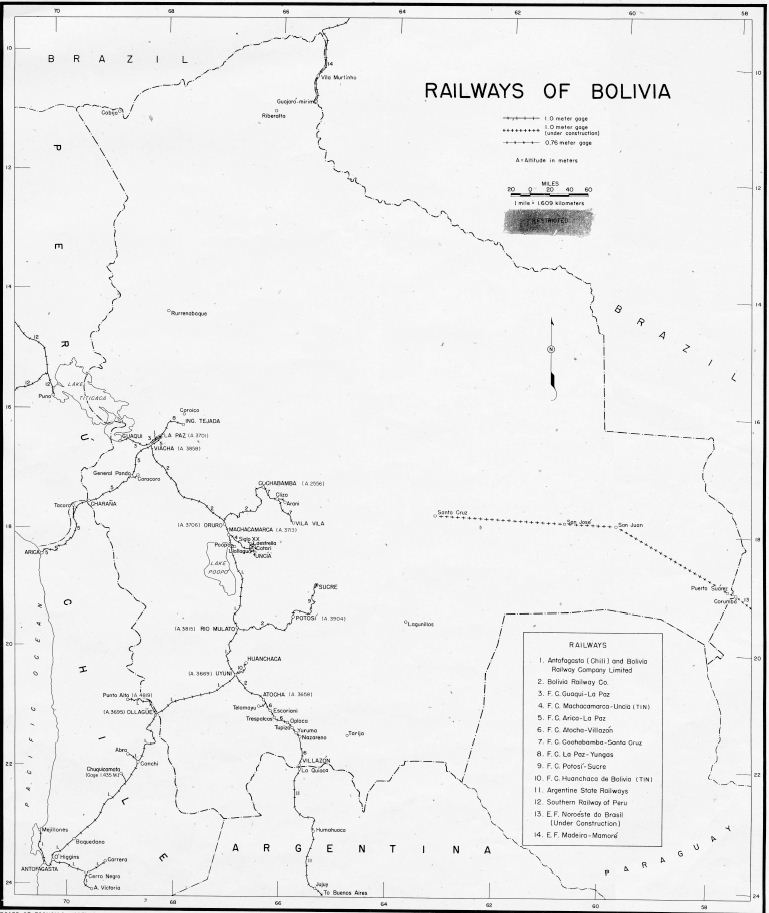

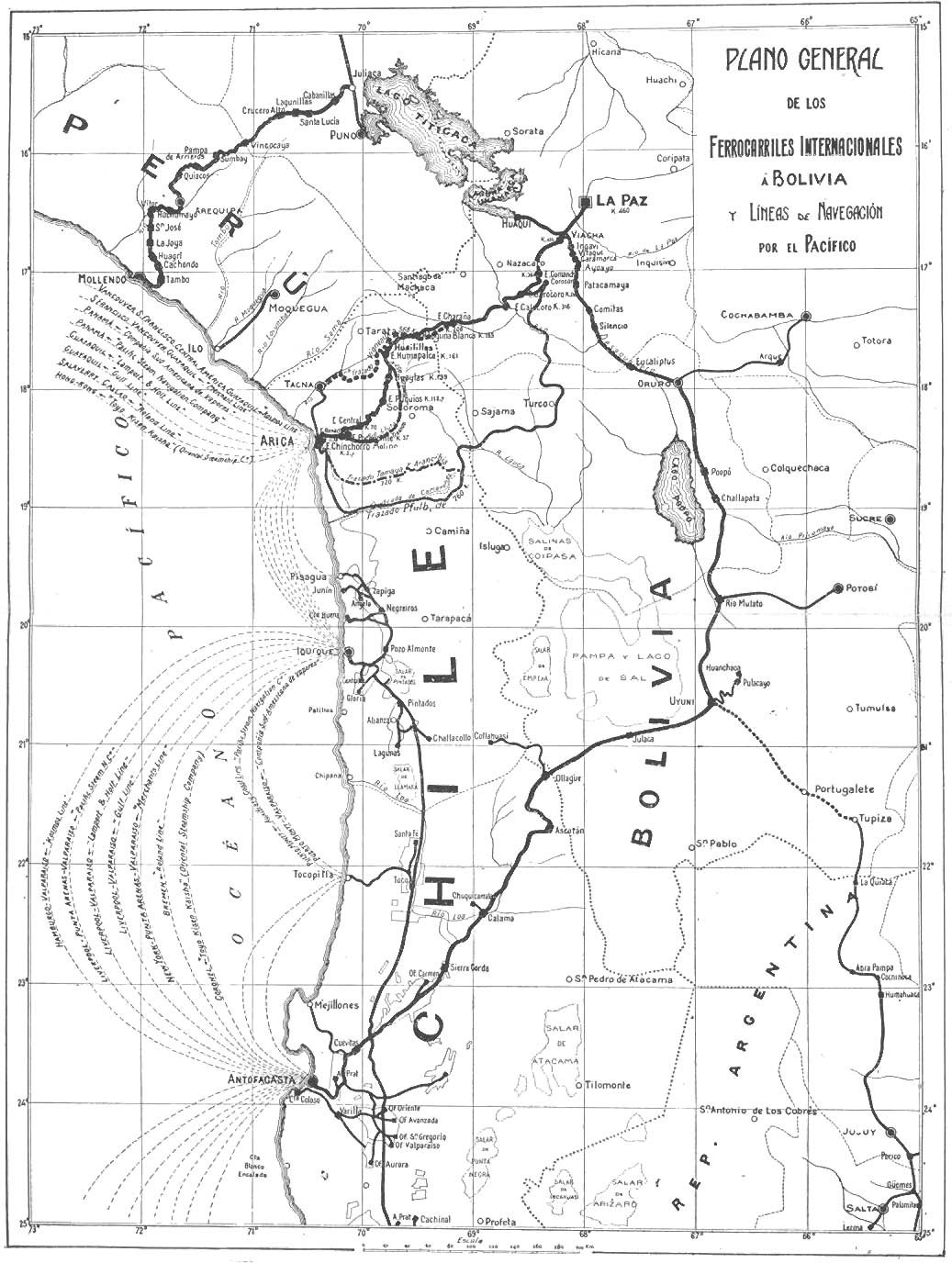

== FCAB Line from Antofagasta ==
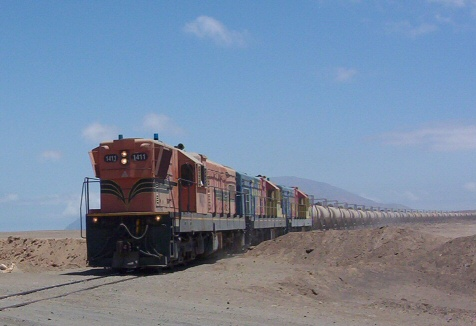
Current Ferrocarril de Antofagasta a Bolivia dates back to 1873

== Rail link to Peru ==
Bolivia built a line to the shores of Lake Titicaca.

== Lines in the south, east ==
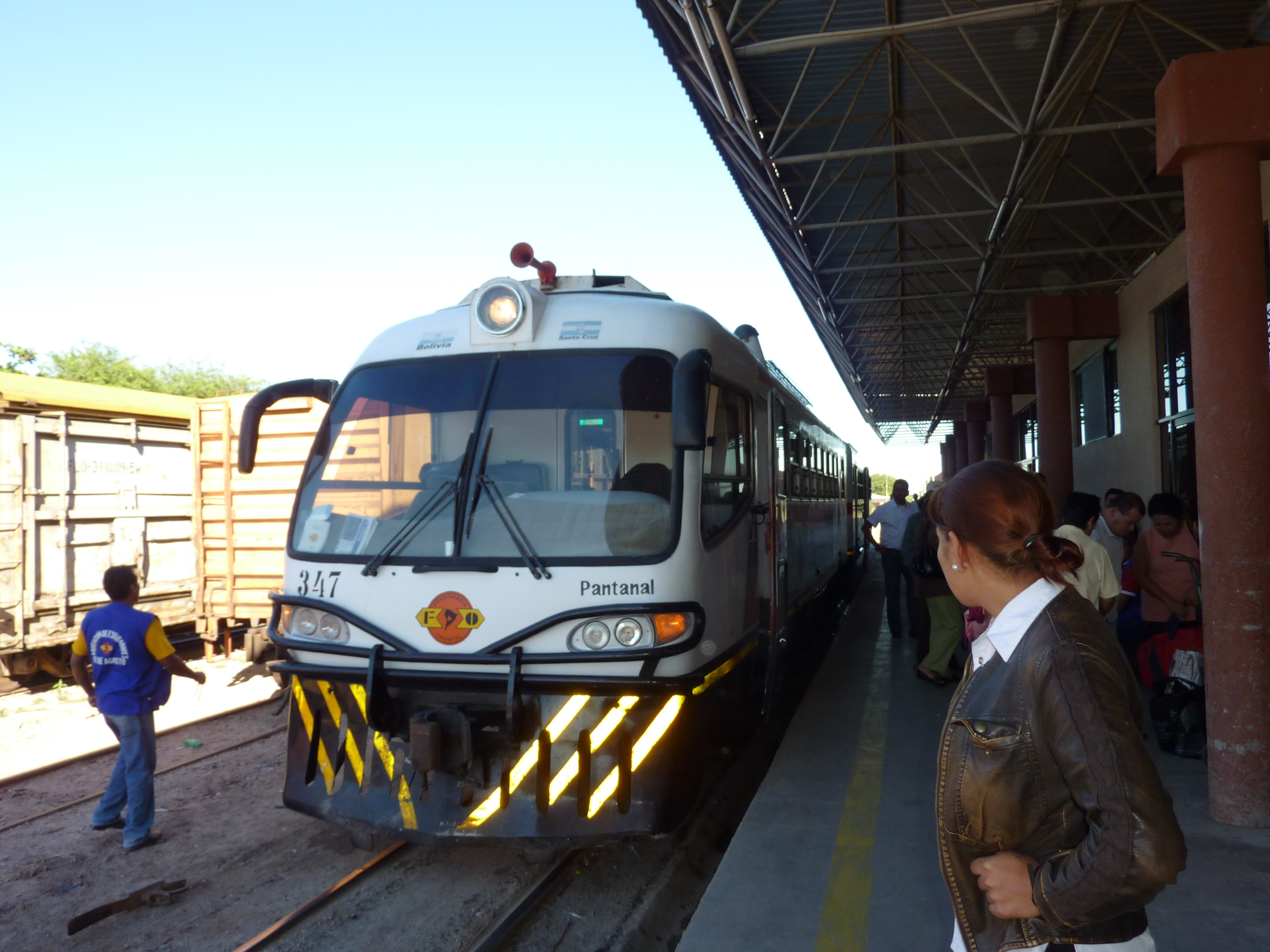
In Bolivia the use of railbuses for passenger transport has long been common.

A line from São Paulo, Brazil, enters Bolivia at Puerto Suarez and connects to this line at Santa Cruz. In the 1950s this last major rail system was completed. A line was intended to run from Santa Cruz to Trinidad (about 500 km (310 mi) in the north center of the country, but never reached there, it ended north of Yapacani (150 km (93 mi)), from where since 2014 an industrial spur is under construction to the ammonia/urea factory near Bulo Bulo (60 km (37 mi)).

Spur lines were run to mining districts and the regional capital of Cochabamba.

== Mamore and Madeira Railway ==
Another railway was a local line in the Amazonian jungle. The Madeira-Mamoré Railroad ran in a 365 kilometres (227 mi) loop around the unnavigable section of the Mamoré River between Guajará-Mirim and Porto Velho in Brazil which was used to bring Bolivian rubber to market.

== Steel lines to the Silver at Potosi ==
Rio Mulatos-Potosí line is a train line in Bolivia, containing Cóndor station, the world's ninth highest railway station (4,787 m (15,705 ft)).

== Future plans ==
The government of Evo Morales has proposed a rail line uniting La Paz, Cochabamba, and Santa Cruz, connecting onwards to Brazil and the Pacific coast.

The department of Cochabamba and the national government are contracting design studies in 2011 for regional trains to run on two routes: Cochabamba-Caluyo-Tarata-Cliza-Punata-Arani and Sipe Sipe-Vinto-Cochabamba-Sacaba-Chiñata. A 180-day study on Sipe Sipe-Chiñata line is being carried out between August 2011 and February 2012. This project, known as Mi Tren, began operation in 2022.

== Chancay mega port ==
With the opening of the mega port at Chancay in 2025 comes the need for proper railway access. Unfortunately such access from the rest of South America is hamstrung by missing links and the multiplicity of track gauges, including 914mm, 1000mm, 1067mm, 1435mm (standard gauge), 1600mm, 1676mm and dual gauge,

== International rail links to adjacent countries ==
- Argentina – yes – 1,000 mm (3 ft 3 3/8 in) both countries
- Brazil – yes – 1,000 mm (3 ft 3 3/8 in) gauge both countries
- Chile – yes – 1,000 mm (3 ft 3 3/8 in) gauge both countries
- Peru – ferry from 1,000 mm (3 ft 3 3/8 in) railhead in Guaqui to 1,435 mm (4 ft 8 1/2 in) railhead in Puno across Lake Titicaca

== Incidents ==
In 2007 thieves had stolen 100 meters of Bolivian track overnight, and the morning freight had insufficient distance to stop. Photo of the site shows locomotives 1021 and 951 remained upright, but extensive damage ensued.

== See also ==
- Transport in Bolivia
- Interoceanic Highway
- Trans-Andean railways
