= Zapala =

- City
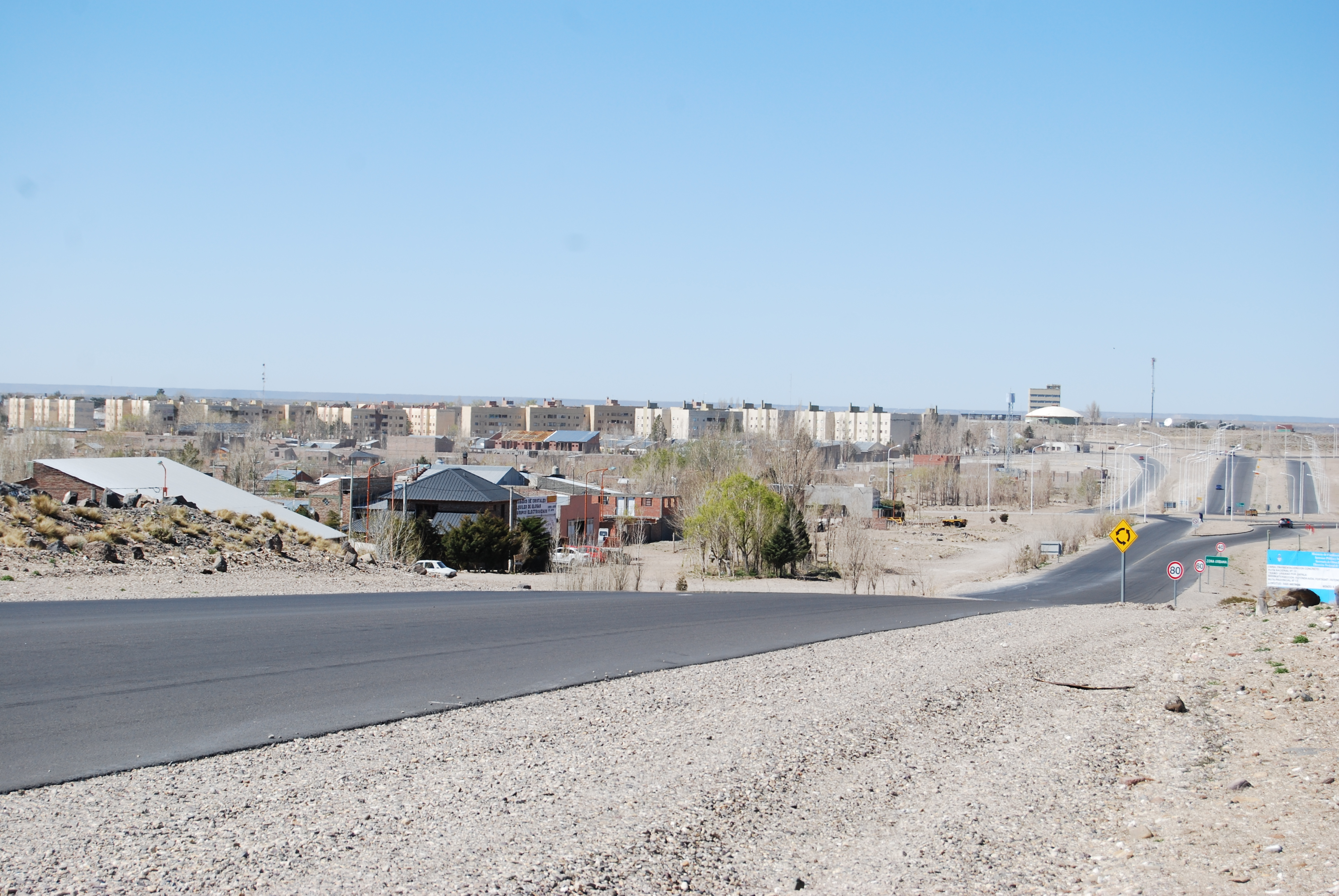
- Zapala

- Location within Neuquén Province Location within Argentina
- Coordinates: 38°54′S 70°04′W
- Country: Argentina
- Province: Neuquén
- Department: Zapala
- Founded: July 12, 1913

Government
  - Intendant: Carlos Koopmann

Area
  - Total: 452 km^{2} (175 sq mi)
- Elevation: 1,012 m (3,320 ft)

Population (2010 census)
  - Total: 32,097
  - Density: 71.0/km^{2} (184/sq mi)
- Time zone: UTC−3 (ART)
- CPA base: Q8340
- Dialing code: +54 2942
- Climate: BSk
- Website: Official website

Zapala is a city and touristic destination in the Patagonian province of Neuquén, Argentina with about 32,000 inhabitants according to the 2010 census [INDEC].

The city is located at the geographic center of the province at the confluence of national and provincial roads, on a route to the Andes and Chile. The city hosts a Loma Negra cement plant.

Zapala is near the Laguna Blanca National Park and a ski resort and is situated in a steppe region, known as Pehuenia, which has small Araucaria forests and includes the nearby town of Aluminé and other towns.

== History ==
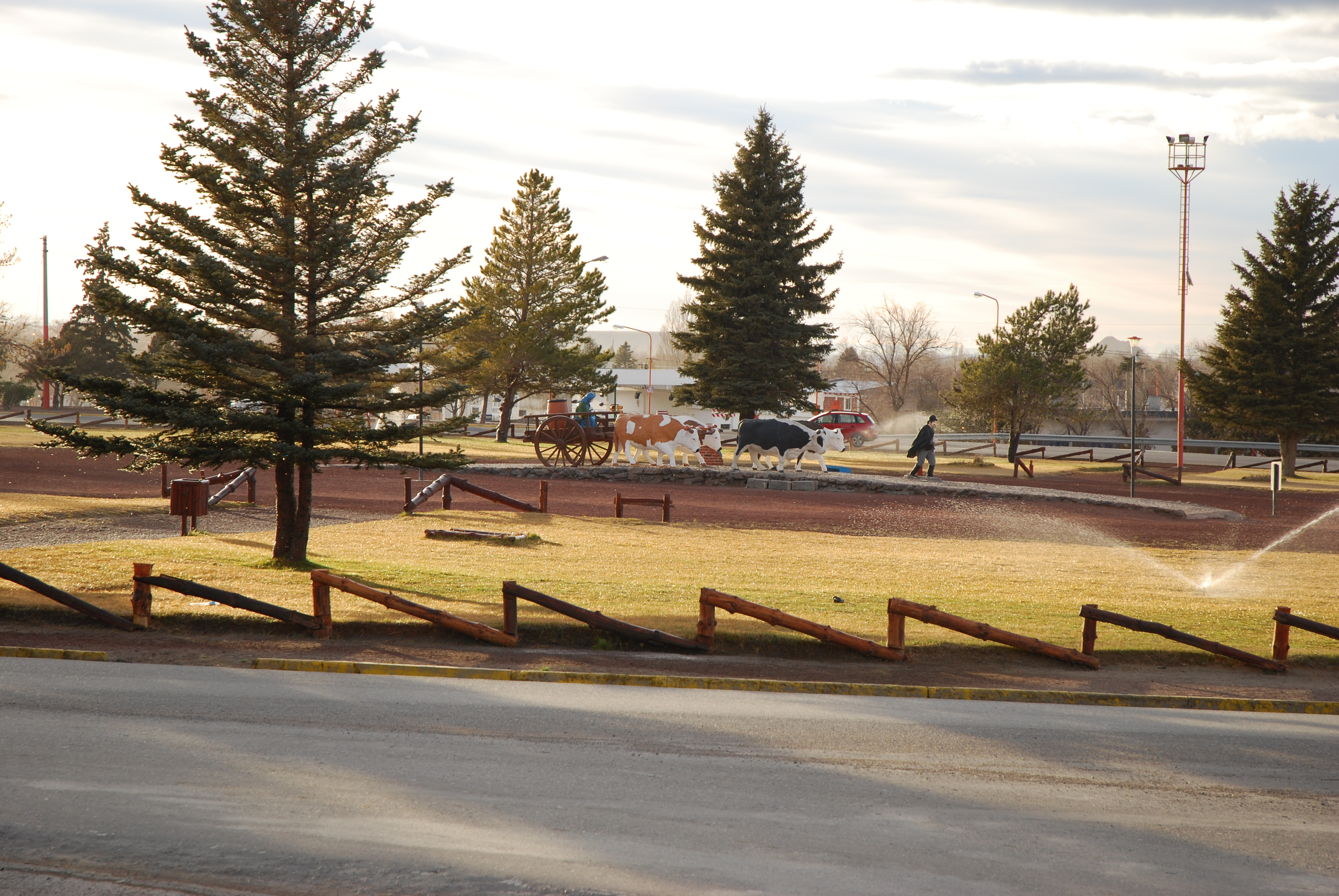
Main roundabout of the town

Zapala was founded on 12 July 1913, and turned into a municipality in 1948. It was (and still is) located around a railway station built by the Buenos Aires Great Southern Railway, a British-owned company taken over by the Ferrocarril General Roca after railway nationalisation in 1948 and, since railway privatisation in 1993, in the hands of Ferrosur Roca. The city is split in two by the railways; on one side there is a commercial district with old buildings, and on the other a modern residential area.

The station is a terminus at the end of the line from Bahía Blanca and Neuquén which was meant to continue across the Andes mountains into Chile. Construction was abandoned in the 1920s although resumption of construction was proposed in 2006.

In 1918 Zapala was the starting point of the first flight by an airplane across the Andes, when Luis Candelaria flew to Cunco, Chile, on April 13. It is served by Zapala Airport.

In March 1994, conscript Omar Carrasco disappeared from the military base in Zapala, where he was serving his mandatory military service. The discovery of his body and that he had been murdered by his superiors led President Carlos Menem to end conscription in August of that same year.

== Geography ==
=== Climate ===
The climate of Zapala is cold semi-arid (BSk, according tho the Köppen climate classification), bordering on a cool-summer Mediterranean climate (Csb). Winters are cold. The climate is also very windy during most of the year; Winds of 160 kilometres per hour (99 mph) have been registered. It may also snow an average of 30–40 centimetres (12–16 in) every year. It is very dry, with about 369 millimetres (14.5 in) of rain yearly. Summers can have high temperatures, up to 35 °C (95 °F), with sunny and stable days and cool nights.

Climate data for Zapala (modelled data)
| Month | Jan | Feb | Mar | Apr | May | Jun | Jul | Aug | Sep | Oct | Nov | Dec | Year |
|---|---|---|---|---|---|---|---|---|---|---|---|---|---|
| Mean daily maximum °C (°F) | 26.8 (80.2) | 25.6 (78.1) | 21.9 (71.4) | 16.3 (61.3) | 11.1 (52.0) | 7.3 (45.1) | 6.6 (43.9) | 8.7 (47.7) | 12.0 (53.6) | 16.0 (60.8) | 20.8 (69.4) | 24.5 (76.1) | 16.5 (61.6) |
| Daily mean °C (°F) | 18.9 (66.0) | 18.0 (64.4) | 14.6 (58.3) | 10.0 (50.0) | 6.0 (42.8) | 2.8 (37.0) | 1.8 (35.2) | 3.4 (38.1) | 5.9 (42.6) | 9.4 (48.9) | 13.5 (56.3) | 16.8 (62.2) | 10.1 (50.2) |
| Mean daily minimum °C (°F) | 10.8 (51.4) | 10.5 (50.9) | 7.8 (46.0) | 4.6 (40.3) | 2.0 (35.6) | −0.5 (31.1) | −1.9 (28.6) | −0.7 (30.7) | 0.7 (33.3) | 3.4 (38.1) | 6.3 (43.3) | 9.1 (48.4) | 4.3 (39.8) |
| Average precipitation mm (inches) | 12 (0.5) | 17 (0.7) | 23 (0.9) | 33 (1.3) | 47 (1.9) | 62 (2.4) | 42 (1.7) | 37 (1.5) | 29 (1.1) | 33 (1.3) | 20 (0.8) | 14 (0.6) | 369 (14.7) |
Source: Climate-Data.org

== See also ==
- South Trans-Andean railway
