= Zapala Airport =

Airport in Argentina

- IATA: APZ; ICAO: SAHZ

Summary
- Airport type: Public
- Serves: Zapala, Argentina
- Elevation AMSL: 3,330 ft / 1,015 m
- Coordinates: 38°58′35″S 70°06′35″W

Map
- Location in Argentina

Runways
Direction	Length		Surface
Direction	m	ft	Surface
09/27	2,200	7,218	Asphalt
- Sources: WAD SkyVector Google Maps

Zapala Airport (IATA: APZ, ICAO: SAHZ) is an airport serving Zapala, a city in the Neuquén Province of Argentina. The airport is 9 kilometres (6 mi) southwest of the city.

The San Martin De Los Andes VOR-DME (Ident: CHP) is located 78.9 nautical miles (146 km) southwest of the airport.

== See also ==
- Transport in Argentina
- List of airports in Argentina
