= Galera railway station =

Railway station in Peru

Coordinates: 11°37′18″S 76°11′08″W

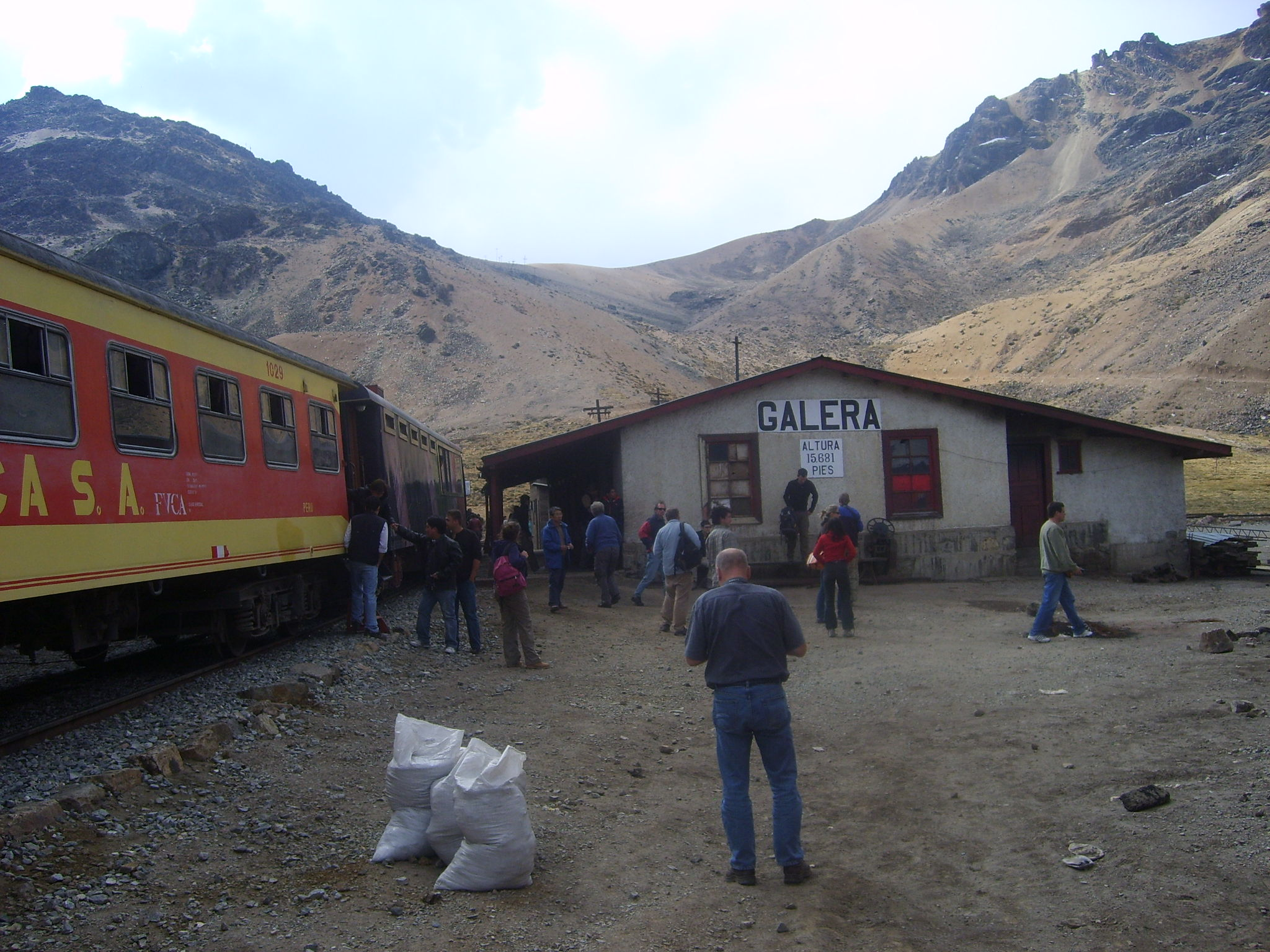
Tourist train of FCCA at Galera station in 2008

Galera is the third highest railway station in the Western Hemisphere, with an elevation of 4,781 m (15,681 ft).

== Overview ==
It is situated in the Andes in Peru at km 172.7 on the Ferrocarril Central Andino (FCCA) line from Lima to Huancayo, immediately east of the 1.2 km (6860 ft) Galera summit tunnel (4,783 m (15,694 ft) above sea level).

The standard gauge line through the station was opened in 1893. In the years 1992–2003 it was out of use as was the whole line through this point because of the terrorist threat by the group Sendero Luminoso. There are now regular monthly train services on the line, including through Galera.

Its place in the league table of the world's highest stations was surpassed by the opening in 2006 of the Qinghai–Tibet Railway's Tanggula railway station in the Tanggula Mountains, Tibet, which at 5,068 m is the world's highest railway station.

== See also ==
- List of highest railway stations in the world
