= Ferrocarril Central Andino =

Peruvian railway company

- Ferrovías Central
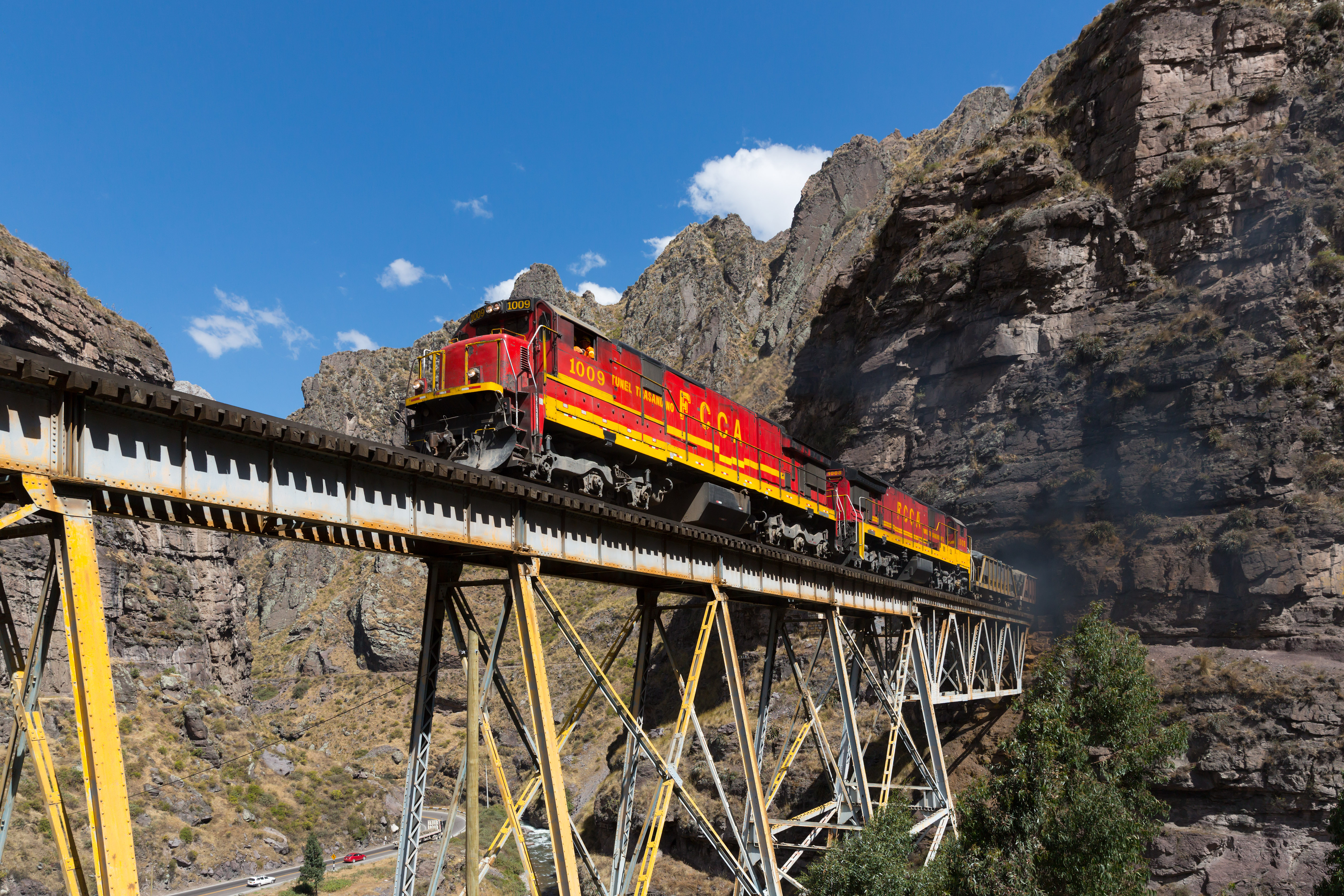
- Crossing a steel bridge between Rio Blanco and San Mateo

Overview
- Concessions: Railroad Development Corporation; Lorenzo Sousa's Peruval Corporation
- Fleet: See rolling stock
- Stations called at: 27
- Stations operated: 8
- Headquarters: Av. Circunvalación Golf Los Incas 170, MORE Building, Office 302, Santiago de Surco, Lima, Peru
- Reporting mark: FCCA
- Locale: Central Peru
- Dates of operation: 1999–present
- Predecessor: Empresa Nacional de Ferrocarriles del Perú

Technical
- Track gauge: 1,435 mm (4 ft 8 1/2 in)
- Length: 535 km (332 mi)

Ferrocarril Central Andino (reporting mark FCCA) is the consortium that operates the Ferrovías Central railway in Peru, linking the Pacific port of Callao and the capital Lima with Huancayo and Cerro de Pasco. As one of the Trans-Andean Railways, it is the second highest in the world constructed by the Polish engineer Ernest Malinowski in 1871–1876.

== Route ==
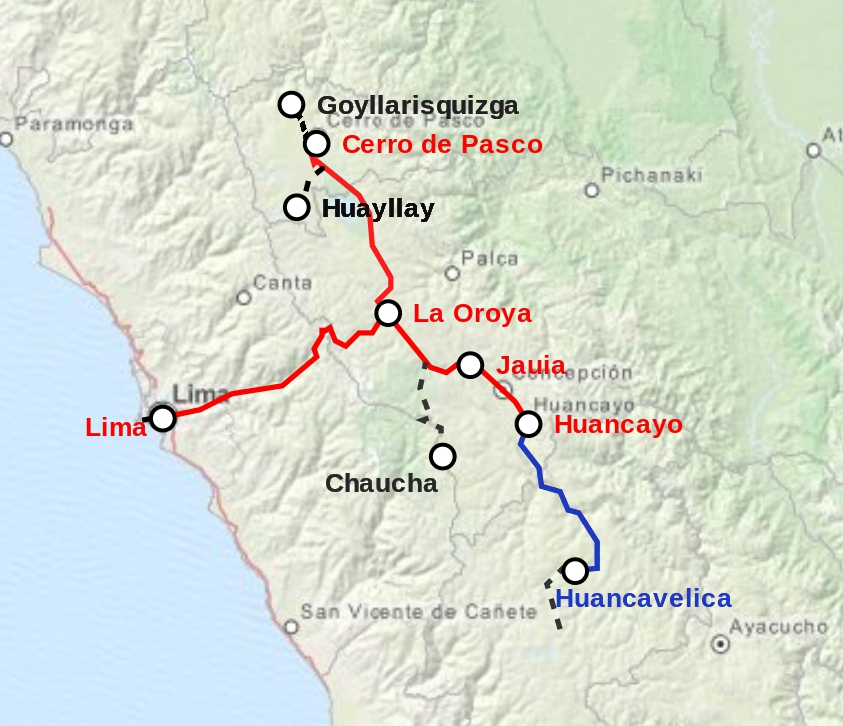
Ferrocarril Central Andino (shown in red)

The line starts at the port city of Callao and goes through Lima and the Desamparados station parallel to the Rímac River. It crosses into Junín state via the Galera Tunnel, the second highest railroad tunnel in the world. It reaches La Oroya, where it splits in two: the southern branch goes to Huancayo, while the northern branch (previously a line operated by a mining company) goes into Pasco region, through Cerro de Pasco (the regional capital) to the Goyllarisquizga coal mines. Formerly a branch split off at Cerro de Pasco and ran into Pachitea Province in Huánuco region. There are 27 stations.

In June 2006, the Peruvian government agreed that FCCA should go ahead with converting the 914 mm (3 ft) gauge Ferrocarril Huancayo–Huancavelica to 1,435 mm (4 ft 8 1/2 in) gauge. Estimated to take 16 months, the US$33m project was to be funded jointly by the government and CAF – Development Bank of Latin America and the Caribbean. This project was finished by October 2010.

RDC has suggested the building of a 23.2 km (14.4 mi), US$2 billion tunnel in the Andes, to reduce the total Lima to Huancayo journey from twelve hours to under five.

== History ==
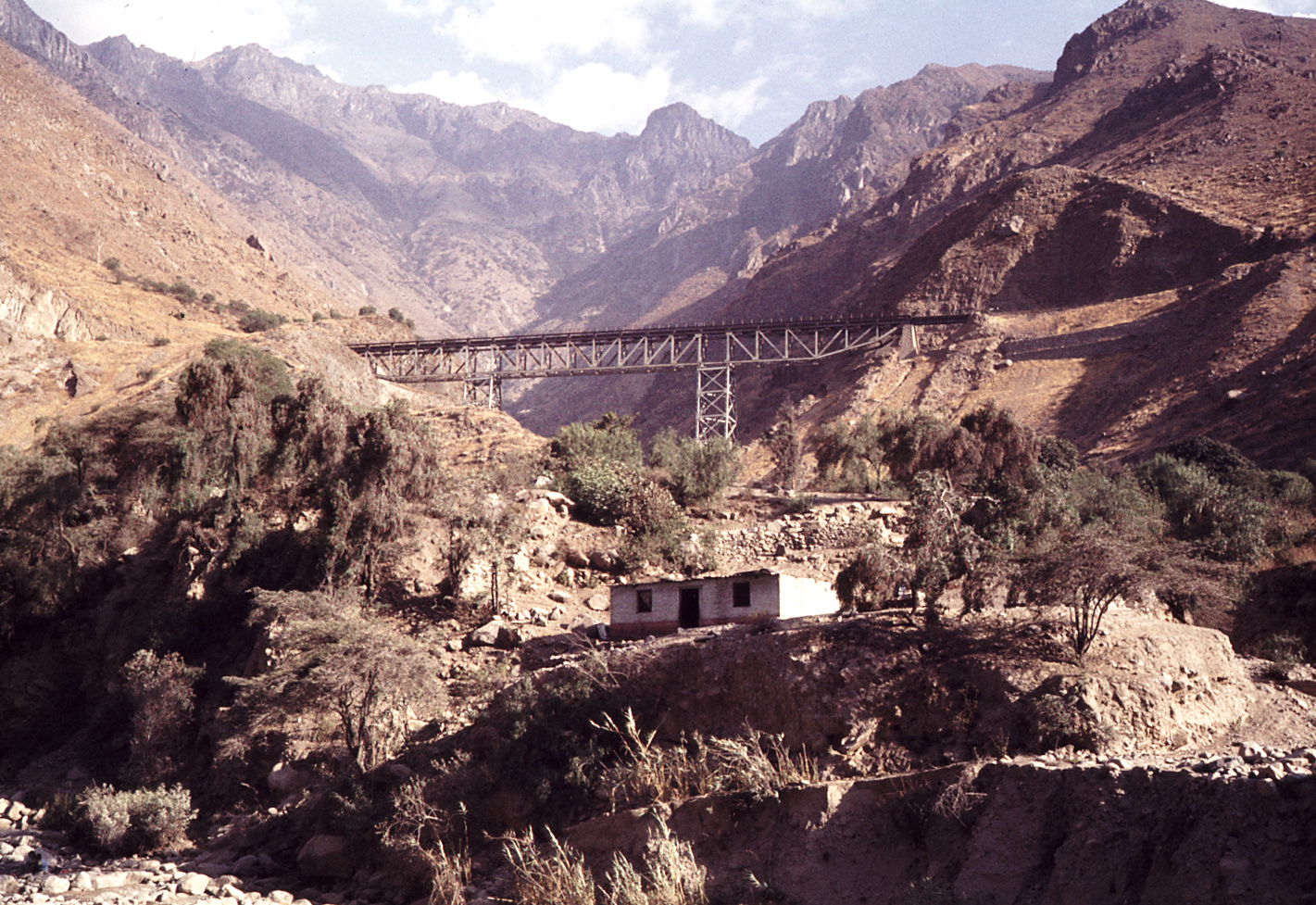
Steel bridge near Matucana

In 1851, engineer Ernest Malinowski proposed to extend the newly opened Lima to Callao railroad as far as the valley of Jauja. Malinowski, a Polish expatriate, was voluntarily exiled in Peru by political problems in his country, occupied at that time by Germany, Russia and Austria.

The government commissioned Felipe Barreda, Mariano Felipe Paz Soldán, and Manuel Marrón to report in detail on the project. This commission devised a detailed plan for the railroad which, after approval by the Peruvian Congress, was integrated with the Malinowski proposal.

The Peruvian Congress named a new commission to make recommendations on alternate construction plans. This second commission delivered a meticulous report of the four possible routes that it had explored and evaluated:

- By the gorge of the Rímac River, starting in Lima and proceeding through Matucana, San Mateo and Tarma.
- By the gorge of the Chillón River, from Lima, through Horseman, Yangas, Obrajillo, Casachanca and Carhuacancha
- Along the Chancay River, from Lima, through Chancay, Macas, Huamantanga, Huaillay and Cerro de Pasco
- Along the Lurín River, from Lima, through Lurín, Sisicaya, Tupicocha, San Damián, Tuctucocha, Pumacocha, Basket, Tarma and Jauja.

According to the report, construction of the proposed line was possible but difficult by the Rímac gorge, almost impossible by the Chillón gorge, impossible by the Chancay, but very easy by the Lurín. This last option was the choice of engineer Gerrit Backus, reputed to be one of the most able professionals in the design and construction of railway routes. This third phase lasted until March 1866 when work stopped due to the war with Spain.

In the early phase of construction, German-Lithuanian immigrant, Felipe Westhoff, was sent to find out railway sleeper for the railway. Westhoff arrived this way to Guaitecas Archipelago in Chile where stands of Pilgerodendron uviferum (Spanish: ciprés de las Guaitecas) were logged. For the purpose of overseeing the business, he founded the settlement of Melinka.

In 1868, Don Diego Masías brought in Henry Meiggs, an American who had been a contractor in both New Jersey and in Chile, who had been working in Chile. The audacious Meiggs, after some negotiation, appeared before the government on 21 September of that year proposing to design and construct a railroad between Lima and Jauja. Meiggs reportedly told the government, "I will place rails there, where the llamas walk." The studies were approved and, with a construction budget that had climbed to 27 million pounds, Meiggs' proposal was accepted. The contract specified that work had to be completed within six years and would be financed by the sale of special bonds, with an annual interest of 6% and amortization of 2% ten years after their sale. The contract was finalized and signed on December 23, 1869.

Construction began in January 1870 with an elaborate ceremony in which the first stone in the Monserrate station in Lima was placed. The work began under the direction of Malinowski, head of the Technical Body, and fellow Polish engineer Edward Jan Habich.

The Callao, Lima & Oroya Railway opened to Chicla by 1878 and reached La Oroya by 1893 and Huancayo (346 km or 215 mi) in 1908. It is the second highest railway in the world (following opening of the Qingzang railway in Tibet), with the Galera summit tunnel under Mount Meiggs at 4,783 m (15,692 ft) and Galera station at 4,781 m (15,681 ft), requiring constructional feats, including many switchbacks and around 69 tunnels and 58 bridges. In 1923 a branch was opened from Ticlio (making it the world's highest junction) to Morococha via La Cima (4,818 m or 15,807 ft above sea level), from where, in April 1955, a spur line opened to Volcán Mine, reaching an (at the time) world record altitude of 4,830 m (15,850 ft). Both branch and spur have since closed to traffic.

After a period of operation by the nationalized entity Empresa Nacional de Ferrocarriles del Perú (ENAFER), in July 1999, the government awarded a divisible consortium led by Railroad Development Corporation (RDC) of Pittsburgh, and Lorenzo Sousa's Peruval Corp who was awarded the South and Southeast railways, a concession to operate the former Ferrocarril del Centro for 30 years. Investors in Ferrocarril Central Andino include RDC, Juan Olaechea & Company, Minas Buenaventura, ADR Inversiones, and Inversiones Andino.

== Rolling stock ==
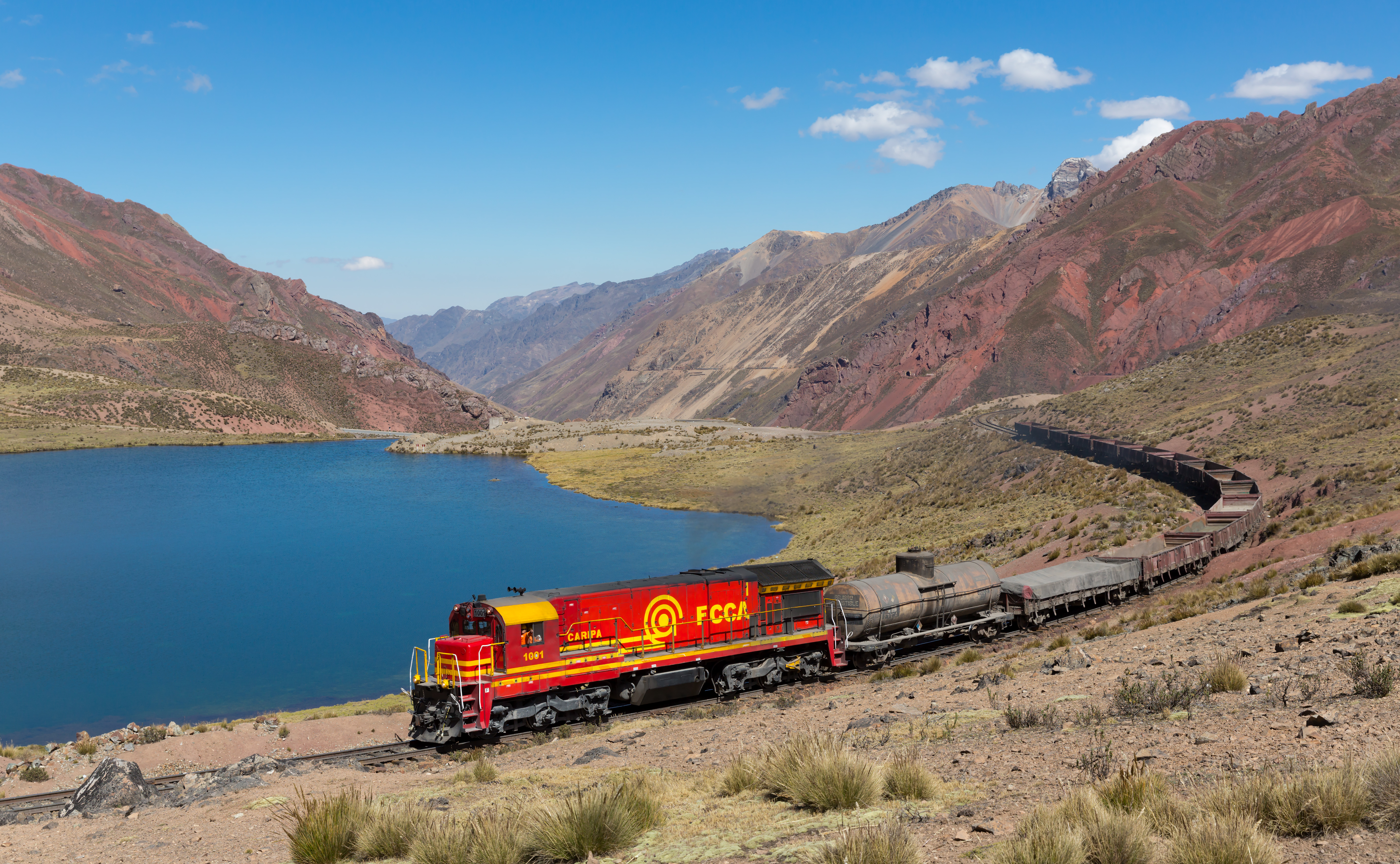
GE C30-7 1001 near the summit

In its early days, the line relied mainly on steam locomotives imported from the United States, but in the twentieth century the most characteristic type were the "Andes" type oil-fired 2-8-0s from Beyer, Peacock & Company of Manchester. No. 206 of this type is retained for special workings. 1941 the company owned 47 steam locomotives, 13 railcars, 71 coaches and 978 goods wagons. The first diesels for road operations were delivered from Alco in 1963.

In 2006 FCCA began a program to convert five General Electric C30-7 locomotives and two GE C39-8 locos to run on compressed natural gas and diesel fuel.

Around 2020–2021, FCCA acquired two former CSX C40-8Ws numbered 7311 and 7374.

In 2024, FCCA picked up two GE C41-8Ws from Union Pacific, former UP 9532 and 9521. That same year, FCCA purchased 19 EMD F40PH locomotives from Caltrain along with 90 Nippon Sharyo Gallery cars, some being cab cars for push-pull configuration - the first of their kind in Peru, for commuter services in Greater Lima. They will begin commuter rail services on the Lima–Chosica route in 2026. With their arrival, Peru became the 2nd South American country to operate bilevel cars.

== Traffic and tourism ==
Traffic includes minerals (mainly from La Oroya), fuels, cement and food products. The route runs through and is famous for the spectacular landscapes of the Peruvian Andes. Although there is now no regular passenger traffic, currently FCCA offers several tourist trips per month from Lima to Huancayo, according to a previously published schedule.

== See also ==
- Huancayo–Huancavelica Railway
- Rail transport in Peru
- Railway stations in Peru
- Transport in Peru
