= Rail transport in Peru =

Railways in Peru

Rail transport in Peru has a varied history. Peruvian rail transport has never formed a true network, primarily comprising separate lines running inland from the coast and built according to freight need rather than passenger need.

Many Peruvian railroad lines owe their origins to contracts granted to United States entrepreneurs Henry Meiggs and W. R. Grace and Company but the mountainous nature of Peru made expansion slow and much of the surviving mileage is of twentieth-century origin. It was also challenging to operate, especially in the age of the steam locomotive.

Also Ernest Malinowski, Polish engineer in exile distinguished himself in the Central Trans-Andean Railway project which runs from Callao to Huancayo.

In the latter part of the 1880s, the principal public railways, the Central and Southern, with others, passed to the control of the Peruvian Corporation, registered in London and controlled by Americans Michael and William R. Grace. In 1972 they were nationalized as Empresa Nacional de Ferrocarriles del Perú (ENAFER), but this survived as an operator only until 1999 when most surviving lines were privatized. Regular passenger traffic now operates over only a small proportion of the mileage.

The Tacna-Arica Railway crosses the boundary with Chile, running twice daily, once in the morning and once in the late afternoon. The Southern Railway provides connection with Bolivia by ship across Lake Titicaca.

== Principal lines ==
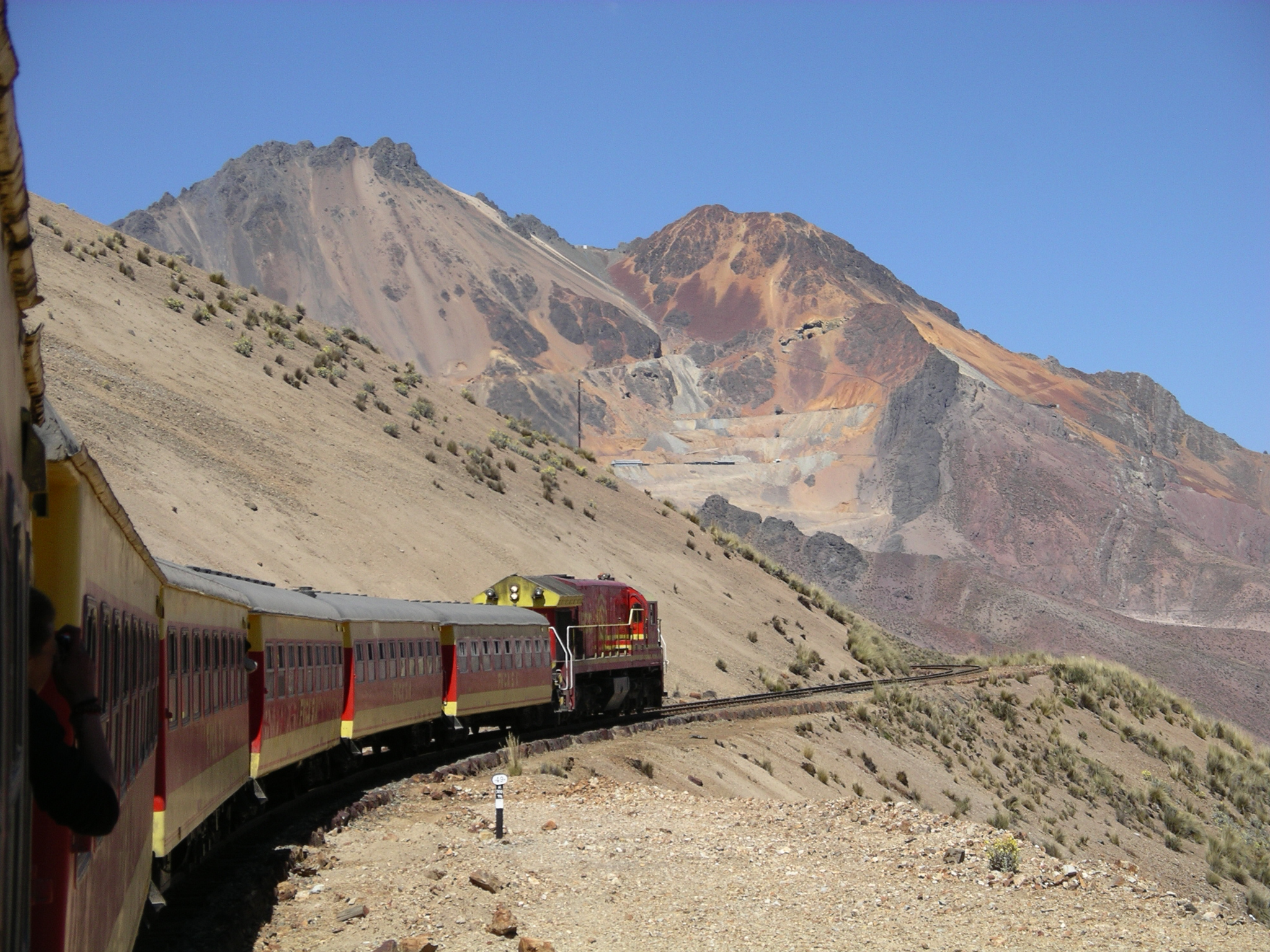
Lima - Morococha - Abra Anticona (Ticlio) - La Oroya - Huancayo passenger line

The Central Railway, Ferrocarril Central del Perú (FCC), incorporates the first railway in Peru opened on May 17, 1851, linking the Pacific port of Callao and the capital Lima (13.7 km (8.5 mi) of standard gauge). This was expanded to form the Callao, Lima & Oroya Railway, opened to Chicla by 1878, the original contractor being Henry Meiggs and engineer being Ernest Malinowski assisted by Edward Jan Habich. The line reached La Oroya by 1893 and Huancayo (346 km (215 mi)) in 1908. It is the second highest railway in the world (following opening of the Qingzang railway in Tibet), with the Galera summit tunnel under Mount Meiggs at 4,783 m (15,692 ft) and Galera station at 4,777 m (15,673 ft) above sea level, requiring constructional feats including many switchbacks and steel bridges. Since 1999 it has been operated as the Ferrocarril Central Andino (FCCA) (with its associated maintenance company Ferrovias Central Andina (FVCA)) by the Pittsburgh-registered Railroad Development Corporation. There is no regular passenger traffic but excursions are operated from the Lima Desamparados station. In April 1955 the Central Railway opened a spur line from La Cima on the Morococha branch (4,818 m (15,807 ft) above sea level) to Volcán Mine, reaching an (at the time) world record altitude of 4,830 m (15,850 ft). Both branch and spur have since closed to traffic.

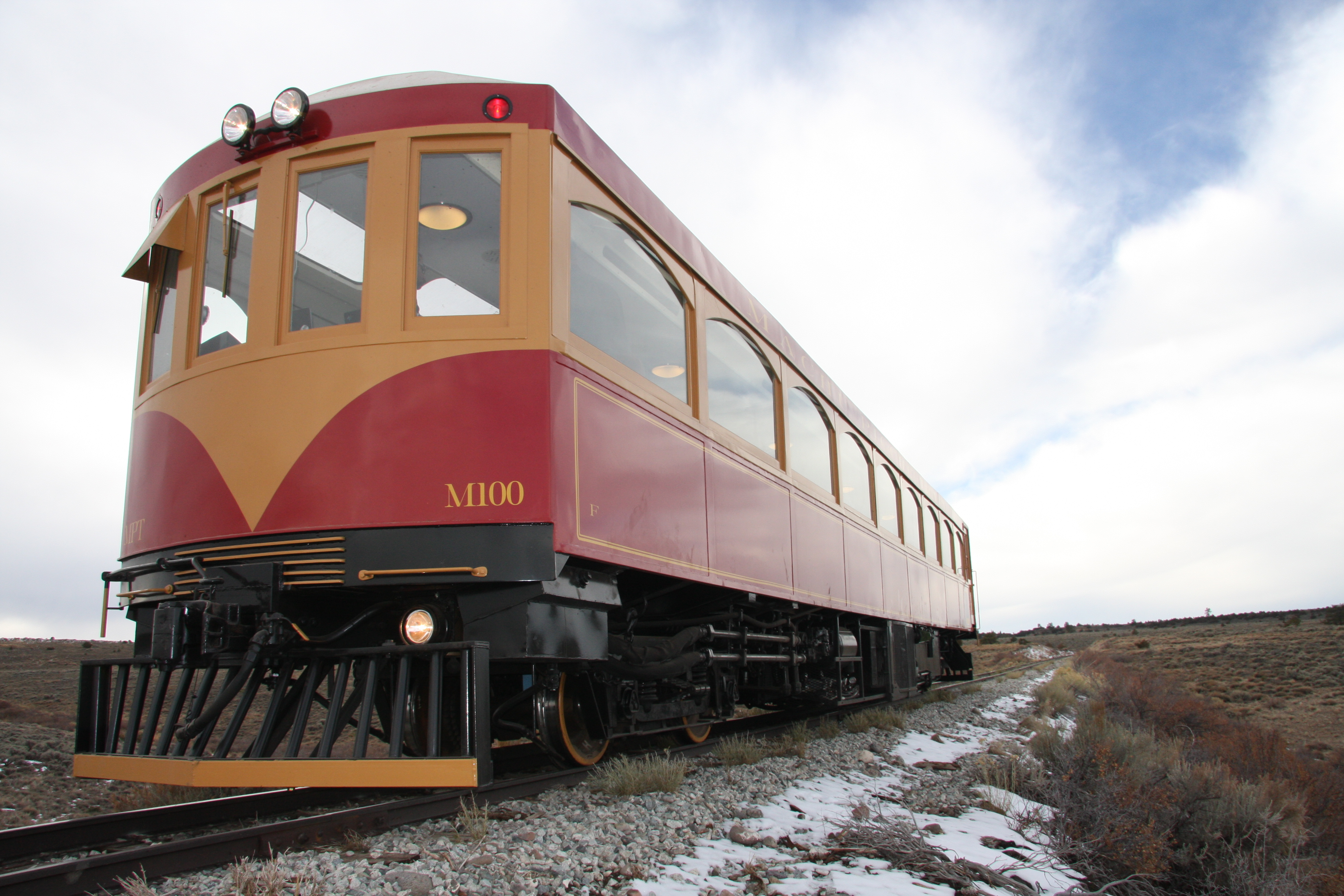
Contemporary Railcar manufactured by EIKON International with final destination to the Cusco - Machu Picchu line

The Central is extended by the Ferrocarril Huancayo - Huancavelica which was authorised in 1904 (engineer: Charles Weber) but work was interrupted during the World War I and it was not opened throughout (148 km (92 mi) of 3 ft (914 mm) gauge) until 1926. Work was continued but never completed on extending the line to the Pacific coast. After a period under provincial government control it was agreed in June 2006 by the Peruvian government that FCCA should go ahead with converting the line to 1,435 mm (4 ft 8 1/2 in) standard gauge (as had in fact been intended prior to 1919). Estimated to take 16 months, the US$33m project was to be funded jointly by the government and CAF – Development Bank of Latin America and the Caribbean. This project was finished by October 2010.

Also connecting with the Central, at La Oroya, is the Cerro de Pasco railway opened in standard gauge form in 1904 to serve ore mining in the Cerro de Pasco district. It was thoroughly North American in all its operations and, although primarily a mineral line, did run a passenger operation, latterly known as the “Flamingo” from the consist purchased from the Florida East Coast Railway. The owning company was nationalised as Centromín in 1974 and operation of the railway was taken over by FCCA. 80 km (50 mi) of 3 ft (914 mm) gauge was completed of a Tambo del Sol-Pachitea line intended eventually to extend to the head of Amazon navigation on the Ucayali River at Pucallpa; this aspiration was abandoned by the government in 1957.

The Southern Railway, Ferrocarriles del Sur del Perú (FCS), another Meiggs concession, was completed from Arequipa to Puno in 1876 and to the coast at Matarani. The railway also operated steamers (including the Yavari) and train ferries on Lake Titicaca connecting with Guaqui in Bolivia. Although work on the Juliaca–Cuzco section was begun in 1872 it was not completed through until 1908. The summit of this section is reached at La Raya (4,313 m (14,150 ft) above sea level). Since 1999 it has been operated by PeruRail, an affiliate of the Belmond Ltd. group, whose tourist trains form the only passenger services.

From Cuzco, the 3 ft (914 mm) gauge Ferrocarril Santa Ana (Ferrocarril Cuzco á Santa Ana) (engineer: Mauro Valderrama) was authorised in 1907, originally at 2 ft 6 in (762 mm) gauge, but the first section was not opened until the early 1920s. It was extended to Aguas Calientes (113 km (70 mi)) in 1928, passing to government control in 1931. Although further extended in stages through to Quillabamba (reached in 1978), landslides (attributed to effects of El Niño) caused it to be abandoned beyond Hidroelectrica in 1998. It is now operated by PeruRail and Inca Rail, and forms the only means of access for visitors to Machu Picchu. At the beginning of 2010 it was cut by landslides.

The isolated Ferrocarril Tacna á Arica was completed in 1856. Following the War of the Pacific it and the surrounding territory passed to Chile; after a settlement in 1929 the Tacna end of the line was returned to Peru while the port of Arica remained in Chilean hands. The British concession for the line reverted to the Peruvian government during World War II. The line remained open for both passengers and freight for several decades, with a museum collection at Tacna station. The line closed in May 2012; in June 2014 the Peruvian government sought bids for redeveloping the line. Finally, in 2016 the line was reopened, offering two services daily.

=== PeruRail ===
- Matarani - port
- Juliaca - junction
- Cuzco - break of gauge, start of 3 ft (914 mm)
- Juliaca - junction, via Arequipa - second city
- Puno - railhead on Lake Titicaca
- Cuzco - break of gauge, end of 4 ft 8 1/2 in (1,435 mm) standard gauge
- Aguas Calientes - railhead for Machu Picchu

=== Tren de la Costa ===
A regional rail line, referred to as Tren de la Costa is planned, paralleling the Pan American Highway between the cities of Sullana and Ica, via Lima.

== Other lines ==
The newest railway in Peru is a standard gauge line opened in 1959 by the Southern Peru Copper Corporation from its opencast mine at Toquepala to the port of Ilo (187 km or 116 mi) with a later branch largely in tunnel to its workings at Cuajone.

There were a number of other lines, all now closed, mostly for mineral or agricultural traffic, running inland from the coast north of Lima and in Pisco Province. There were also lines serving nitrate deposits in the Tarapacá Region, ceded to Chile in 1883.

Some railway exhibits, including a working 500 mm (19 3/4 in) gauge pleasure line, are to be seen in the Parque de la Amistad in the Surco district of Lima.

== Rail links with other countries ==
- Bolivia – shipping from 1,435 mm (4 ft 8 1/2 in) railhead in Puno to 1,000 mm (3 ft 3 3/8 in) railhead in Guaqui across Lake Titicaca by car float (Lake Titicaca car float).
- Chile – a semi-isolated 1,435 mm (4 ft 8 1/2 in) Tacna-Arica Railway connected Tacna, Peru to the port of Arica, Chile.
- Ecuador – none.
- Colombia – none.
- Brazil – none.

== Metro ==
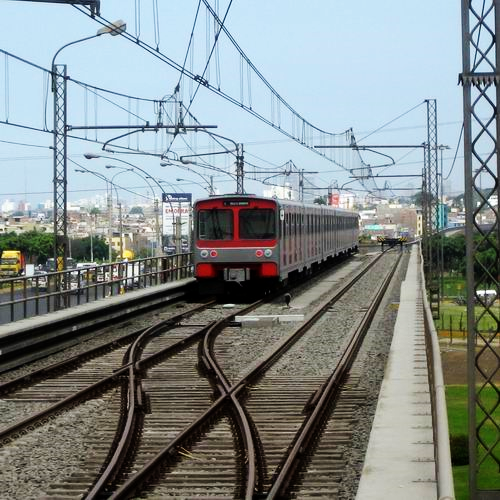
Lima Metro line 1

Lima has a standard gauge metro service called Lima Metro or Tren Eléctrico. The line 1 is operating now with 39 km and 26 stations, a second line is under construction. A fast bus system called metropolitano complements this system.

A light railway Metro Wanka was partially constructed in the central Andean city of Huancayo but the project eventually failed.

== See also ==
- Empresa Nacional de Ferrocarriles del Peru
- Ferrocarril Central Andino
- Huancayo-Huancavelica Railway
- PeruRail
- Transport in Peru
- Lima Tramway
