= Huancayo–Huancavelica Railway =

Railway line in Peru

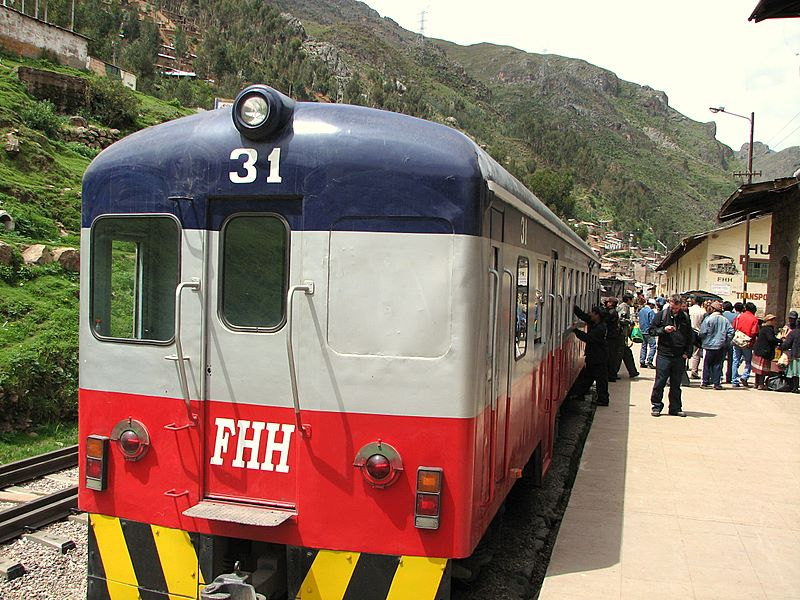
- Tren Macho at Huancavelica station

Overview
- Locale: Central Peru
- Termini: Huancayo Chilca; Huancavelica
- Stations: 10

Service
- Type: Heavy rail
- System: Ferrocarril Huancayo–Huancavelica
- Operator(s): Ministry of Transport and Communications

History
- Opened: 24 October 1926

Technical
- Line length: 128.7 km (80.0 mi)
- Track gauge: 1,435 mm (4 ft 8 1/2 in) standard gauge
- Old gauge: 914 mm (3 ft)

The Ferrocarril Huancayo–Huancavelica (reporting mark FCHH) (English: Huancayo–Huancavelica Railway), also known as Tren Macho, is a state-owned, non-electrified, single-track, 128.7 km long, standard gauge railway connecting the cities of Huancayo and Huancavelica in the central highlands of Peru. The railway is operated by the Peruvian Ministry of Transport and Communications (MTC) but is expected to be operated as a concession from the end of 2019.

== History ==
The original 3 ft (914 mm) railway was authorised by law 667 of November 20, 1907.

The first studies were carried out by Mr. Carlos Weber. That same year the work began but construction was very slow and was stopped in 1910. On September 2, 1910, Carlos B. Eddy and the government signed a contract for the construction to continue from the point at which it had stopped. No work was done under this new contract and the works were eventually restarted by the government itself in 1918.

The railway was opened on 24 October 1926.

The railway was converted to 1,435 mm (4 ft 8 1/2 in) standard gauge between 2006 and 2010 by the neighboring Ferrocarril Central Andino.

== Route description ==
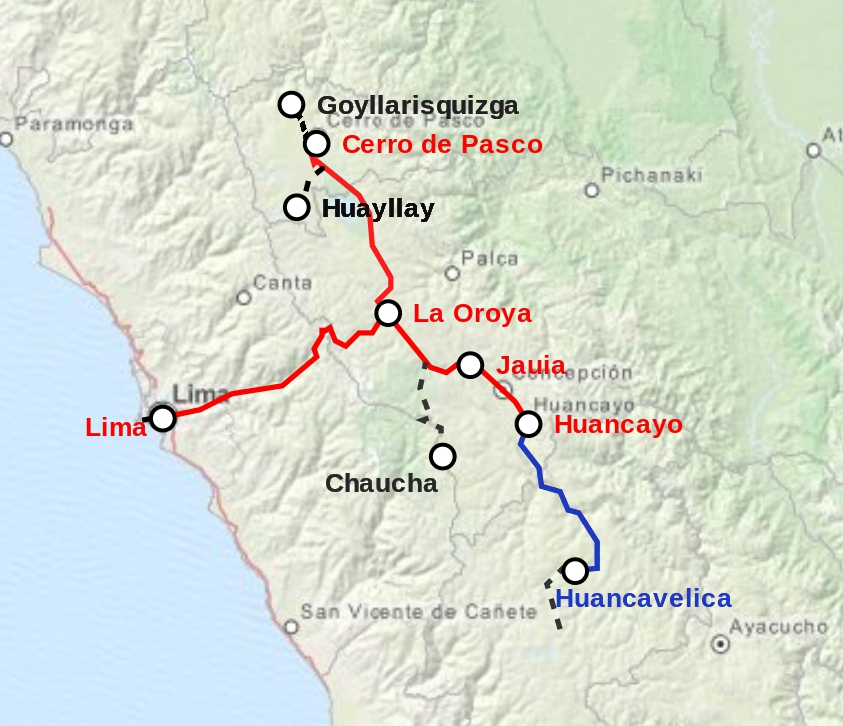
Route of the Ferrocarril Huancayo–Huancavelica (shown in blue).

The Huancayo–Huancavelica railway is a mountain railway in the Peruvian central highlands and one of the highest railways in the world. At its lowest point it is still 2,819 metres (9,249 ft) above sea level. It runs through districts of Huancayo, Huancán, Huayucachi, Viques and Cullhuas in the Junín region, and those of Ñahuimpuquio, Mariscal Cáceres, Izcuchaca, Pilchaca, Cuenca, Acoria, Yauli and Huancavelica in Huancavelica region.

The train travels parallel to the Mantaro River to the city of La Mejorada, then uphill parallel to the Ichu river, during the tour you will observe a variable and beautiful landscape with occasional small villages. It is a rustic journey and the train frequently sees visits from vendors with snacks. It is also possible to see some works done by the ancient inhabitants of these towns and villages such as the Colonial Bridge of Izcuchaca, the thermal baths of Aguas Calientes, the rustic stations and the spectacular road engineering of the railway.

The line is known as El Tren Macho (The Male Train) because some years ago the line did not have the best technical attention and a local creative legend evolved suggesting that the train “leaves when he wants and arrives when he can”!

== Services ==
The service in summer 2019 is 3 trains per week using locomotive hauled trains with buffet and 1st class coaches, the buffet class being superior to 1st class. Departure times are: From Huancayo to Huancavelica on Monday, Wednesday and Friday depart at 0630, arrive at 1200. From Huancavelica to Huancayo on Tuesday, Thursday and Saturday depart at 0630, arrive at 1150.

There is a railcar service which operates once in each direction on the days that the locomotive hauled train doesn't run, taking 4 hours. From Huancayo: at 0630 on Tuesday and Thursday, at 1200 on Friday, and at 1800 on Sunday. From Huancavelica: at 0630 on Monday, Wednesday and Friday, and at 1800 on Friday.

== Future prospects ==
In 2015 PERU's Agency for the Promotion of Private Investment (Proinversión) issued an invitation for bids for a 30-year concession to “comprehensively rehabilitate” the 128.7 km line. The concessionaire will be responsible for the design, financing, and rehabilitation of infrastructure and rolling stock, together with the provision of trains, equipment and electromechanical systems, operation, and maintenance of the railway.

The project will include work on retaining walls and drainage as well as rehabilitation of the line's 38 tunnels and 15 viaducts.

== See also ==
- Ferrocarril Central Andino
- Rail transport in Peru
- Railway stations in Peru
- Transport in Peru
