= Monte Balmaceda =

Mountain located in the Magallanes Region, Chile

Balmaceda
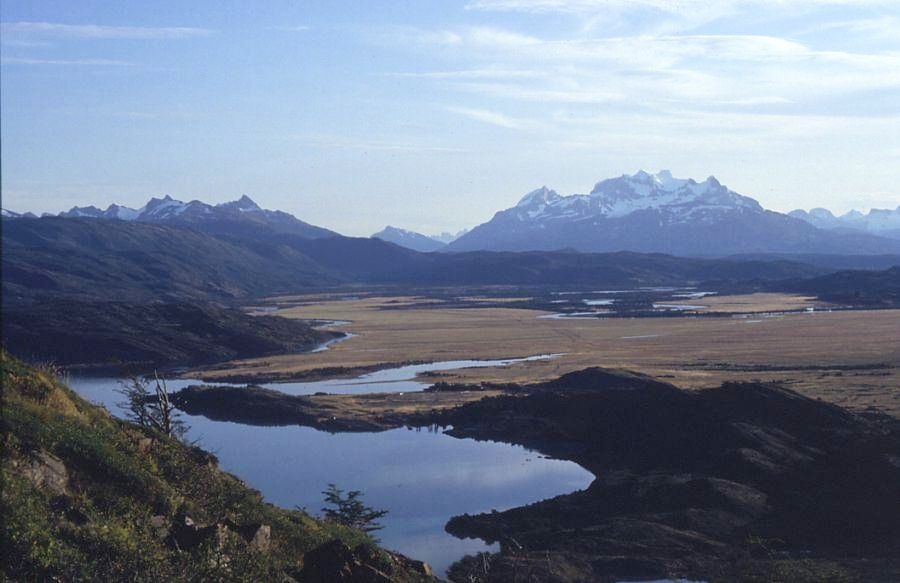
- Balmaceda from Del Toro Lake area.

Highest point
- Elevation: 2,035 m (6,677 ft)
- Coordinates: 51°25′S 73°11′W

Geography
- Location: Chile
- Parent range: Andes

Monte Balmaceda is a heavily glaciated mountain located in the Magallanes Region of Chile. It stands at the head of Última Esperanza Sound, in the south portion of Bernardo O'Higgins National Park and near the mouth of the Serrano River. The glaciers Balmaceda and Serrano mantle the slopes of the mount.

In its vicinity is Torres del Paine National Park.

== See also ==
- Puerto Natales
- Cordillera Riesco
- Cordillera Sarmiento
- Fjord of the Mountains
