= Señoret Channel =

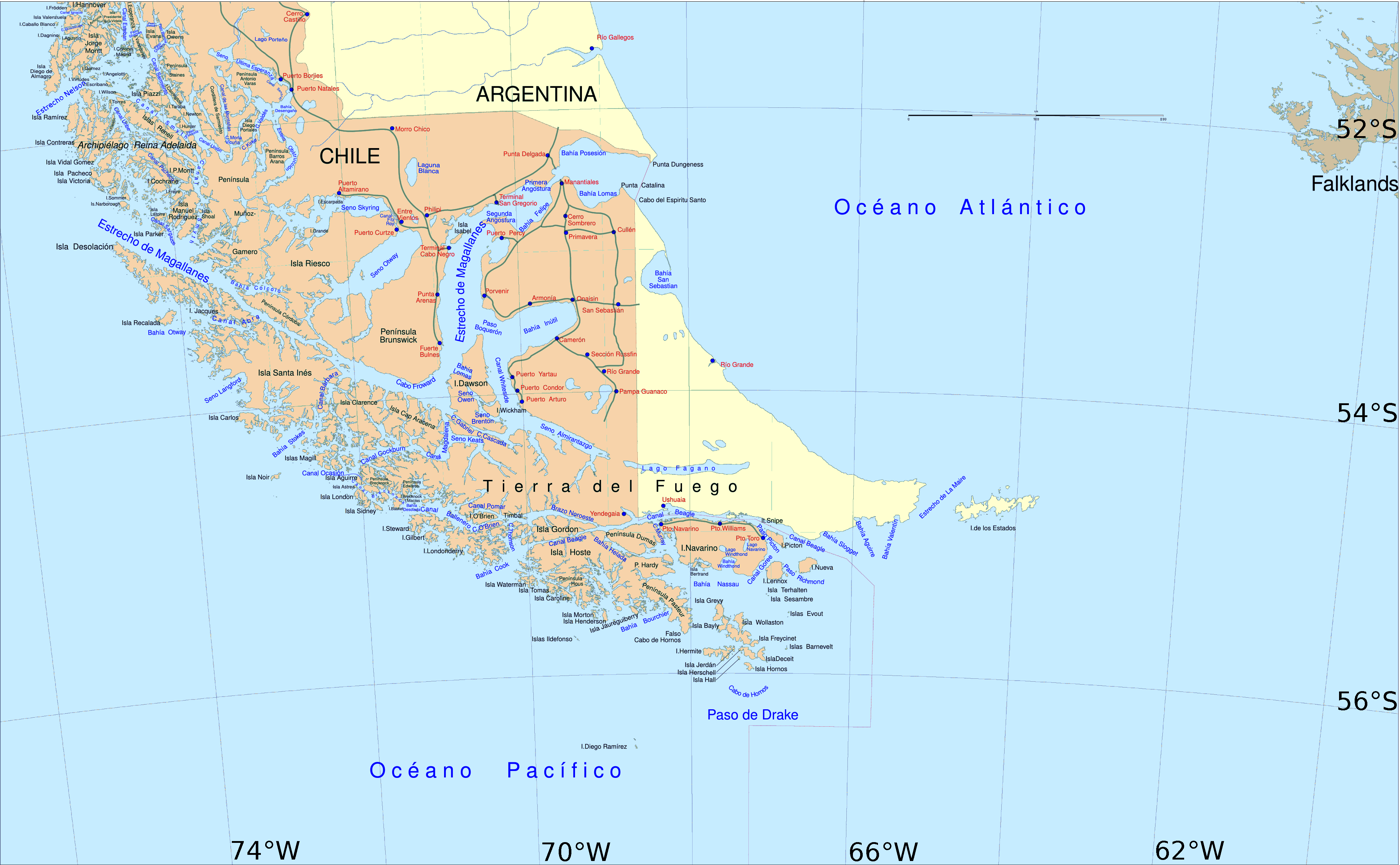
Fjords and channels round of Puerto Natales. Click to enlarge and expand.

The Señoret Channel is a navigable surface water body in the Patagonian region of Chile. One of the major towns along the channel is Puerto Natales. Hermann Eberhard, the first European to explore the interior of northern Patagonia, used the Señoret Channel to navigate northward in order to access the remote portions of this region. One of his findings was the Milodon Cave at the base of the Cerro Benitez, where he recovered remains of the extinct Giant sloth and evidence of habitation of early man from 10,000 BC.

== See also ==
- Fjords and channels of Chile
- Eberhard Fjord
- Lago Porteño
- Turbio River (Patagonia)
