= Última Esperanza Sound =

Inlet in the Chilean region of Magallanes

- Interactive map of Última Esperanza Sound
- Coordinates: 51.475°S 73.103°W

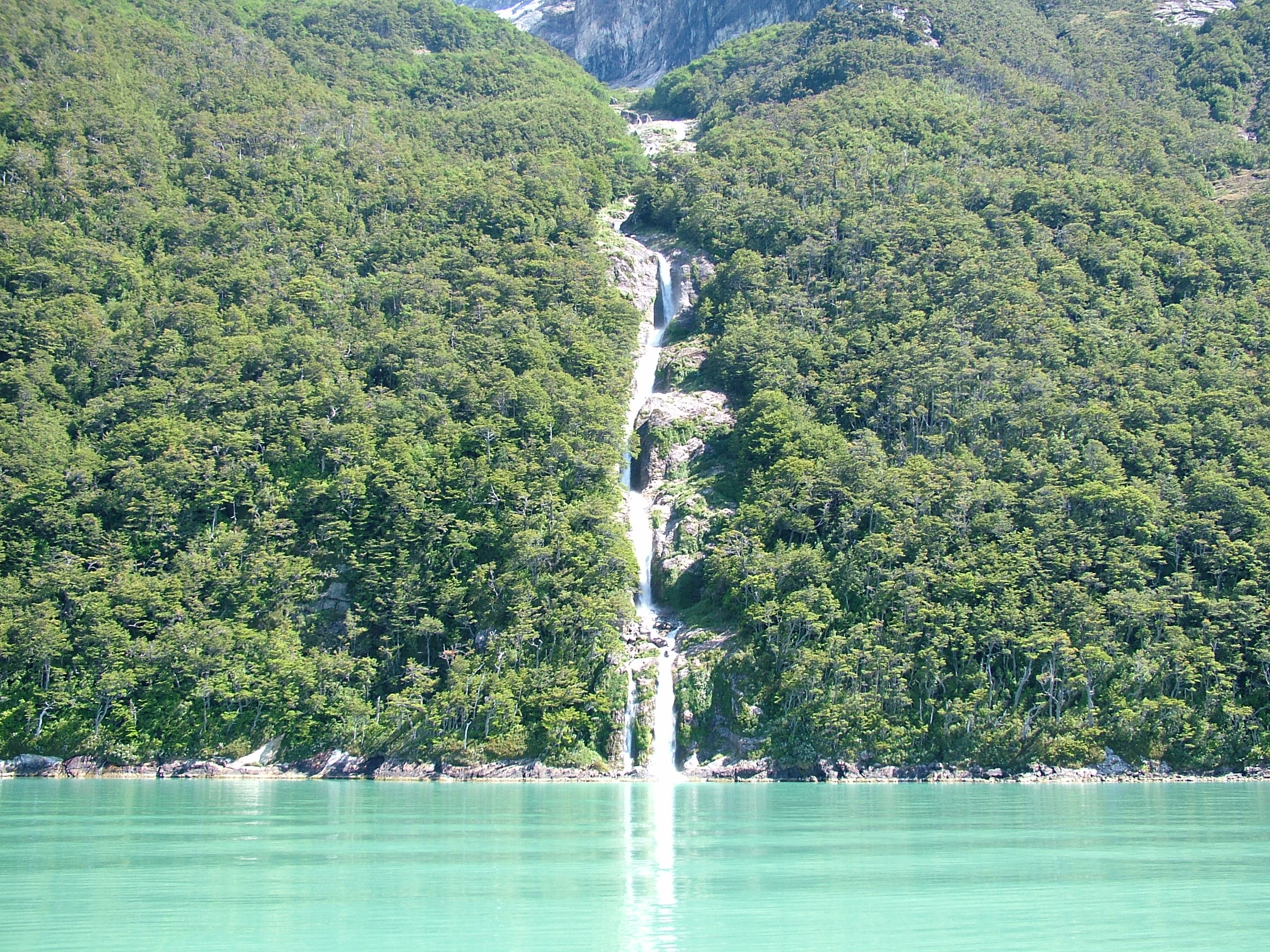
Numerous streams tumble over the cliffs into the sound in fine cascades.

Última Esperanza Sound (Spanish: Seno de Última Esperanza, 'Last Hope Sound' or 'Inlet of Last Hope') is an inlet stretching from the mouth of Eberhard Fjord to the outskirts of Monte Balmaceda, within the Magallanes Basin. The navigator Juan Ladrillero named it so in 1557, because he felt it was this direction that was his last chance to reach the Strait of Magellan. The inlet ends at a glacier, and not at the strait.

This inlet is tidal, and drains an extensive basin. It receives the waters of almost all the surface waters of Torres del Paine National Park through the Serrano River. The sound occupies a valley carved by glacial action. During the last glacial period glaciers reached their maximum extent in Última Esperanza Sound about 48,000 years ago.

Last Hope Sound along with the Señoret Channel forms a navigation route, which connects Puerto Natales with several protected areas of the region. In the vicinity of the Eberhard Fjord is located Cueva del Milodón Natural Monument, where remains have been recovered of the extinct ground sloth along with a settlement of prehistoric humans.

== See also ==
- Bernardo O'Higgins National Park
- Cerro Toro
- Cordillera Riesco
- Cordillera Sarmiento
- Fjord of the Mountains
- Lago Porteno
