= Turbio River (Patagonia) =

Turbio

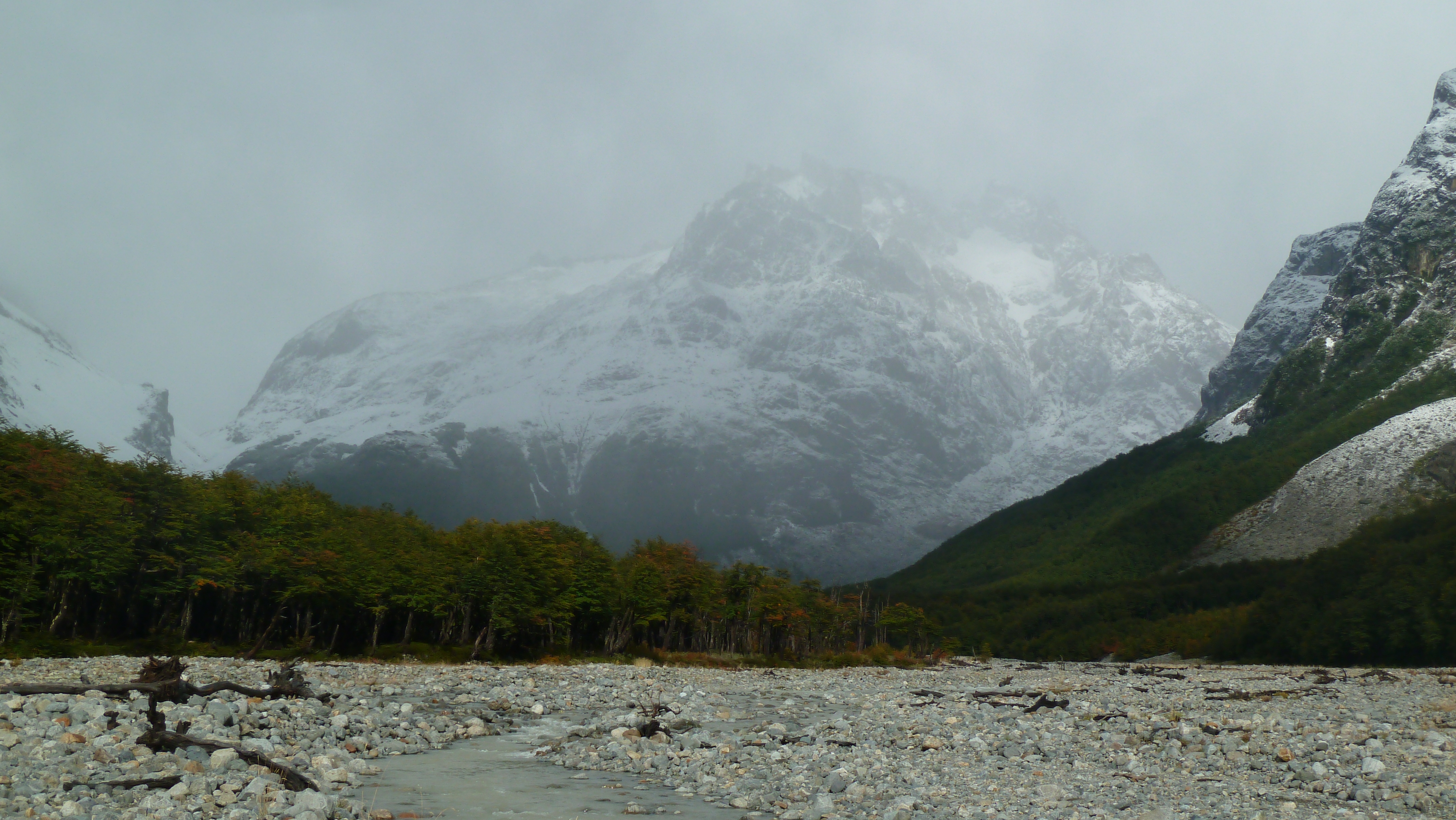
The bed of the Turbio River in March 2011

The Turbio River (or Rio Turbio in Spanish) rises in a mountainous region of the Argentine Andes.

It discharges to the Gallegos River.

Río Turbio headwaters are in a part of the Andes where there is no central valley, or gap between the eastern and western ridges. Not far from its mouth to the northwest lies the Cueva del Milodón Natural Monument, where remains of the extinct giant sloth have been discovered, along with evidence of habitation by early man c. 10,000 BC.

== See also ==
- Eberhard Fjord
- Hermann Eberhard
- Lago Porteno
