= Natales =

- Commune
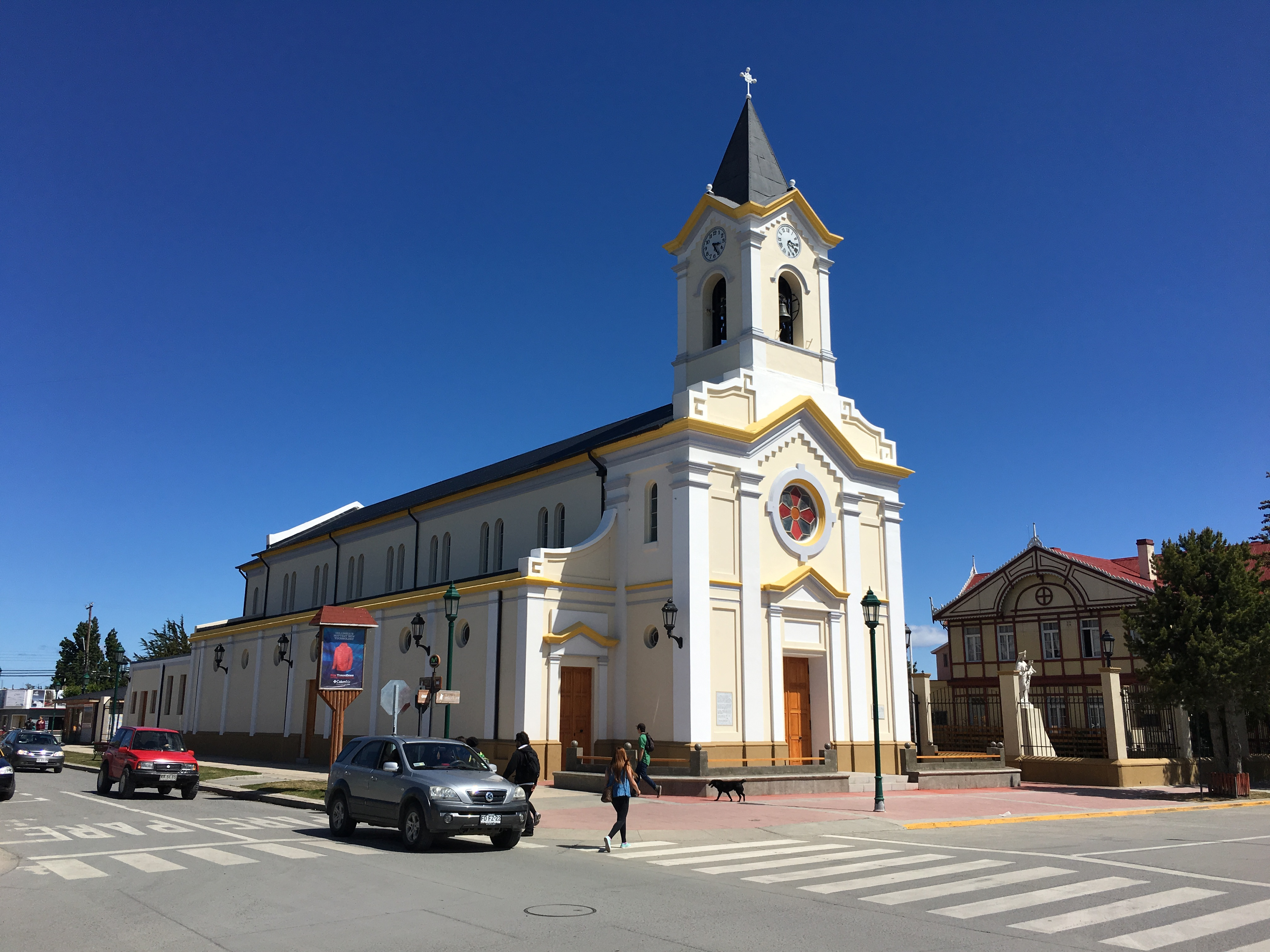
- Cathedral of Puerto Natales

- Coat of arms Location in Chile
- Coordinates (capital): 51°44′S 72°31′W
- Country: Chile
- Region: Magallanes y Antártica Chilena
- Province: Última Esperanza
- Founded: 1927
- Capital: Puerto Natales

Government
  - Type: Municipality
  - Alcaldesa: Antonieta Oyarzo Alvarado (IND)

Area
  - Total: 48,974.2 km^{2} (18,909.0 sq mi)
- Elevation: 3 m (9.8 ft)

Population (2002 Census)
  - Total: 19,116
  - Density: 0.39033/km^{2} (1.0109/sq mi)
  - Rural: 2,138
- Demonym: Natalino

Sex
  - Men: 10,068
  - Women: 9,048
- Time zone: UTC-4 (CLT)
  - Summer (DST): UTC-3 (CLST)
- Area code: 61
- Website: Official website (in Spanish)

Natales (Spanish for "births") is a commune of the Última Esperanza Province in the Magallanes and Antartica Chilena Region of extreme southern Chile. Its capital and only port city is Puerto Natales.

== Geography ==
The commune's area spans 48,974.2 km^{2} (18,909 sq mi), making it one of the largest communes in Chile, after only Antártica (which is, however, 25 times Natales' size), and larger than eleven of the country's 16 political regions. The Cueva del Milodón Natural Monument lies 24 km (15 mi) northwest of Puerto Natales.

== Demography ==
Historical population
Year	Pop.	±% p.a.
1930	4,987	—
1940	7,505	+4.17%
1952	9,197	+1.71%
1970	13,979	+2.35%
1982	16,932	+1.61%
1992	17,275	+0.20%
2002	19,116	+1.02%
2017	21,477	+0.78%
2024	24,152	+1.69%
Source: "Censo de Población y Vivienda". National Statistics Institute.

Its capital and only city, Puerto Natales (2002 population: 16,978), is one of the southernmost settlements in the world.

According to the 2002 census of the National Statistics Institute, the Natales commune has 19,116 inhabitants (10,068 men and 9,048 women). Of these, 16,978 (88.8%) lived in urban area of the city and 2,138 (11.2%) in rural areas. The population grew by 10.7% (1,841 persons) between the 1992 and 2002 censuses. The commune comprises 96.3% of the total provincial population of 19,855. Its population density is only 0.38/km^{2} (0.98/sq mi).

== Administration ==
Puerto Natales serves as capital of both the Natales commune and the Última Esperanza Province. As a commune, Natales is a third-level administrative division of Chile administered by a municipal council, headed by an alcalde who is directly elected every four years. The 2012-2016 alcalde is Fernando Paredes Mansilla (UDI). The regional governor, since 14 July 2021, is Jorge Flies Añón.

- Herminio Fernández García (UDI)
- Ana Mayorga Bahamonde (UDI)
- Tolentino Soto Ríos (PDC)
- José Cuyul Rogel (PS)
- Alfonso Coñoecar Millalonco (PC)
- Felipe Muñoz Muñoz (Ind.).

Within the electoral divisions of Chile, Natales is represented in the Chamber of Deputies by Juan Morano Cornejo (PDC) and Gabriel Boric Font (Ind.) as part of the 60th electoral district, which includes the entire Magallanes and Chilean Antarctica Region. The commune is represented in the Senate by Carolina Goic Boroevic (PDC) and Carlos Bianchi Chelech (Ind.) as part of the 19th senatorial constituency (Magallanes Region).
