= Boris Pérez =

Chilean footballer (born 1989)

Personal information
- Full name: Boris Iván Pérez Ulloa
- Date of birth: 7 June 1989 (age 37)
- Place of birth: Puerto Natales, Chile
- Height: 1.82 m (6 ft 0 in)
- Position: Goalkeeper

Youth career
- Colo-Colo
- 2003–2008: Audax Italiano

Senior career*
| Years | Team | Apps | (Gls) |
| 2009–2016 | Audax Italiano | 2 | (0) |
| 2012 | → Everton (loan) | 0 | (0) |
| 2013 | Audax Italiano B | 8 | (0) |
| 2013–2016 | → Deportes Melipilla (loan) | 70 | (0) |
| 2016 | Água Santa | – | (–) |
| 2016–2019 | Deportes Melipilla | 23 | (0) |
| 2017–2018 | → Unión San Felipe (loan) | 11 | (0) |
| 2023 | Bories | – | (–) |
| Total | | 114 | (0) |
- * Club domestic league appearances and goals

Boris Iván Pérez Ulloa (born 7 June 1989) is a Chilean former professional footballer who played as a goalkeeper.

== Career ==
A product of Audax Italiano youth system, where he came at the age of thirteen, he also played for Everton, Deportes Melipilla and Unión San Felipe.

Abroad, he had a brief stint with Brazilian side Água Santa in 2016.

Retired in 2019, he returned to play in an official championship in 2023 by signing with Deportivo Bories from Puerto Natales for the Copa Chile.
