= Puerto Natales =

Puerto Natales Natales
- City
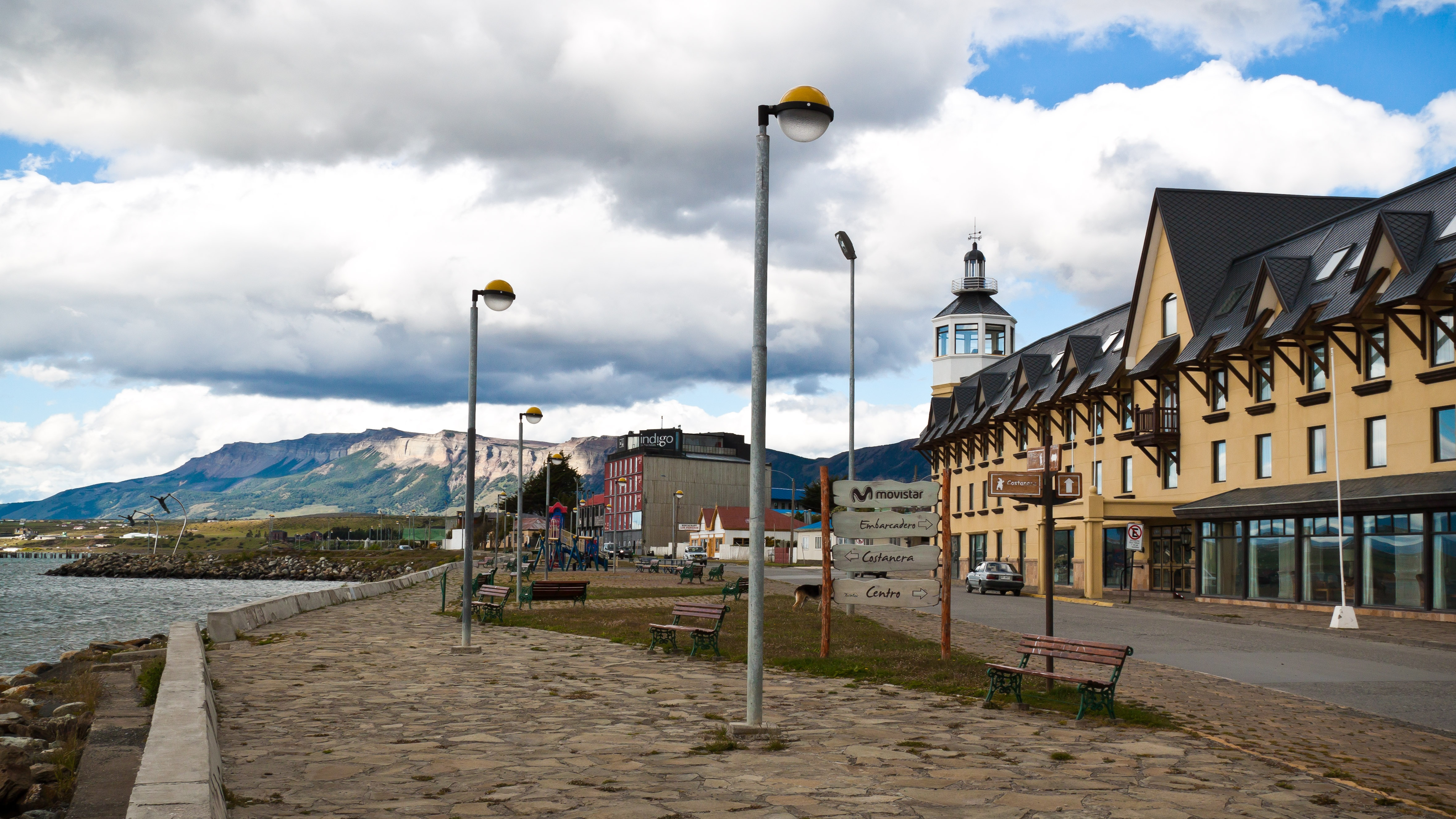

- Coat of arms Location in Chile
- Nickname: Natales
- Coordinates (city): 51°44′S 72°31′W
- Country: Chile
- Region: Magallanes y Antártica Chilena
- Province: Última Esperanza
- Commune: Natales
- Founded: 1911

Government
  - Type: Municipality
  - Alcalde: Fernando Paredes Mansilla (UDI)

Area
  - Total: 48,974.2 km^{2} (18,909.0 sq mi)
- Elevation: 3 m (9.8 ft)

Population (2012 Census)
  - Total: 18,505
  - Density: 0.37785/km^{2} (0.97863/sq mi)
  - Rural: 2,138

Sex
  - Men: 10,068
  - Women: 9,048
- Time zone: UTC−3 (CLST)
- Area code: 56 + 61
- Website: www.muninatales.cl

A life-size Mylodon statue greets visitors to the city of Puerto Natales (2024).

An old red park bench overlooks a rainbow forming within the Señoret Channel in Puerto Natales (2024).

La Mano - is a concrete sculpture in the form of a human hand reaching upward on the edge of the Señoret Channel in Puerto Natales, Chile (2024).

Puerto Natales is a city in Chilean Patagonia. It is the capital of both the commune of Natales and the province of Última Esperanza, one of the four provinces that make up the Magallanes and Antartica Chilena Region in the southernmost part of Chile. Puerto Natales is the only city in the province. It is located 247 km (153 mi) northwest of Punta Arenas. It is the final passenger port of call for the Navimag ferry sailing from Puerto Montt into the Señoret Channel as well as the primary transit point for travellers to Torres del Paine National Park, Chile.

It is located at the opening of Última Esperanza Sound and was originally inhabited by the Kawésqar or Alacaluf people and the Aoniken or Tehuelche people. The first Europeans to visit the area where the city is located were the expeditionaries led by Juan Ladrillero, a Spanish explorer who was looking for the Strait of Magellan's western passage in 1557.

The city was settled in the late 19th century by European immigrants, primarily Germans, British, including English, Welsh and Scots, Croats, Greeks, Italians and Spaniards. It was then settled by Chilean people, with a substantial number coming from Chiloé Archipelago, all attracted by the sheep breeding industry.

The city was formally founded under the government of Ramón Barros Luco on May 31, 1911. Nowadays, one of its most important industries is tourism although the cattle and aquaculture industries are also significant. While winds, colds and thin soils limit horticulture in Puerto Natales there is still a small-scale local produce of zucchini, cherry tomatoes, strawberries, cucumbers and carrots.

== History and current status ==
The province where Puerto Natales is located was named Última Esperanza (Last Hope) by the sailor Juan Ladrilleros, who was seeking the Strait of Magellan in the year 1557. It was his "last hope" to find the Strait after exploring the maze of channels between the waters of the Pacific and the mainland. It was not until three centuries later, in 1830, that another major expedition sailed through the fjords and channels of Última Esperanza: the British expedition of the sloop HMS Beagle. Some of the expedition members such as Robert FitzRoy, William Skyring and James Kirke as well as their senior officers are remembered by several place-names in the area. Commander Fitzroy was the captain during the Second voyage of HMS Beagle (1831–1836).

In 1870, interest in the region of Ultima Esperanza was rekindled. Among the daring travelers who ventured to these desolate lands was Santiago Zamora, also known as 'Baqueano' Zamora. He discovered the lakes of the Torres del Paine area and many wild horses are locally known as baguales. Another was the English traveler and writer Lady Florence Dixie, commemorated in the city's present-day Hotel Lady Florence Dixie. Dixie wrote the book Across Patagonia, where she relates the first tourist expedition to Torres del Paine (the three granite spires) which she named as Cleopatra's needles.

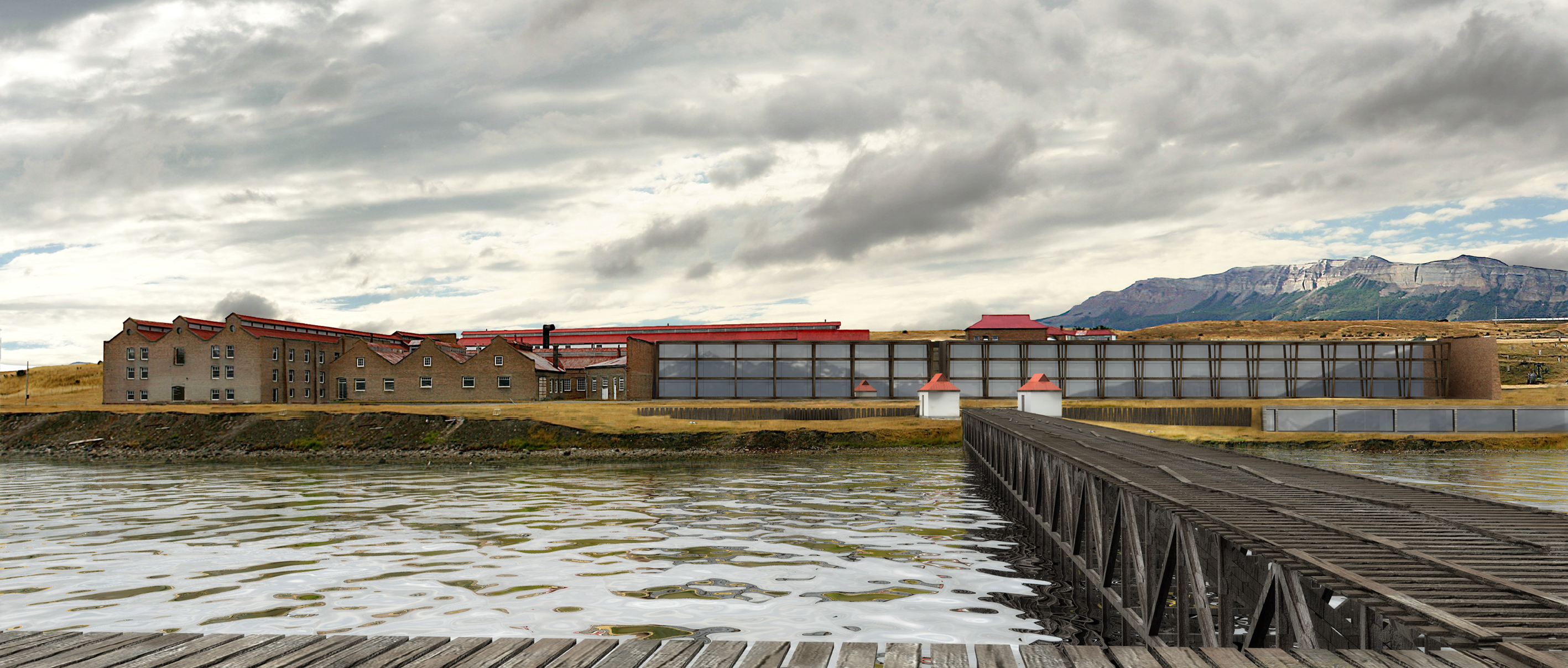
Puerto Bories (2010)

Puerto Natales was founded in May 1911 as a port for the sheep industry. During the last half of the 20th century the sheep industry declined and many people from Puerto Natales started to work in the coal mines of Río Turbio in Argentina. During the zenith of the sheep industry in Patagonia, two large "frigorificos" or cold-storage plants were constructed in the Natales area, of which one has survived. The plant at Puerto Bories, about 4 km NW from Puerto Natales, was a project of the Sociedad Explotadora de Tierra del Fuego. The Puerto Bories site was inaugurated in 1913 and was in production until 1993. The Cold-Storage Plant was constructed in "Post Victorian Industrial" architectural style and features of number of British machinery examples which reflect the technology of the beginning of the 20th century. The Cold-Storage Plant complex is part of the industrial history of the Puerto Natales area. A restoration project made by The Singular Hotels, was started on the complex in 2010 in order to transform the cold storage plant into a luxury hotel, called The Singular Patagonia.

In 1919, a strike by the Federación Obrera de Magallanes resulted in the workers taking control of the town. The strike was later suppressed by the government.

== Tourism ==
Torres del Paine National Park

Puerto Natales has many tourist facilities, and it has become a common base for excursions to the world-renowned Torres del Paine National Park, one of the most popular national parks in Chile. Its main feature, the mountainous "towers" ("torres"), are an impressive and unique rock formation known as "Torres del Paine". They comprise the Torre Central (Central Tower), 2,800 meters high; Torre Sur (South Tower) 2,850 m; and Torre Norte (North Tower) 2,248 m. Named a Unesco World Biosphere Reserve, the park is home to hundreds of different birds and many species of mammals, as well as the third-largest ice field on the planet. The national park is open all year round but best season to visit the park is from October to April, the southern hemisphere spring and summer. This season has more sunny days with less rain and more than 16 hours of daylight.

Cueva del Milodón Natural Monument

Twenty four kilometres (15 mi) northwest of Puerto Natales, along the flanks of the Cerro Benitez Mountains, lies the Cueva del Milodón Natural Monument. It comprises several caves and a rock formation called the Silla del Diablo (Devil's Chair). The main cave, used by prehistoric tribes, is notable for the discovery in 1895 of skin, bones and other parts of a giant ground sloth known as the Mylodon (Mylodon darwini), today extinct. The area includes the Bernardo O'Higgins National Park; and the Alacalufes National Reserve. The latter is the site of the Fjord of the Mountains, Cordillera Riesco and Cordillera Sarmiento.

Nao Victoria Museum

A museum in nearby Punta Arenas. The Nao Victoria was one of the five ships (and the only one that survived) that sailed in the Spanish Armada de Molucca expedition which discovered the meeting point the Atlantic and Pacific oceans. A realistic, technically and historically accurate replica of the ship commemorates the expedition and allows visitors to experience the historic voyage.

Sightseeing

Companies offering boat trips and kayak tours through the Patagonian fjords depart from Puerto Natales Pier and take tourists to view the landscapes of the fjords and the region's many icebergs.

On land, bike trips and horseback riding on the trails around Torres del Paine National Park allow tourists to visit the characteristic farms that dot the countryside around Puerto Natales.

Facilities

Today, there are dozens of camping sites, hostels, hotels, bed & breakfasts, restaurants and transportation services to fit a variety of budgets.

How to get there

There are daily LATAM flights from Santiago, Chile's capital city, to the Presidente Carlos Ibáñez del Campo International Airport in Punta Arenas. The smaller Sky Airline offers direct flights to the Teniente Julio Gallardo Airport near Puerto Natales three times a week. Overland, Puerto Natales is 3,100 km (1,900 mi) from Santiago, 2,300 km (1,400 mi) from Puerto Montt and 1,600 km (990 mi) from Coyhaique.

== Demographics ==
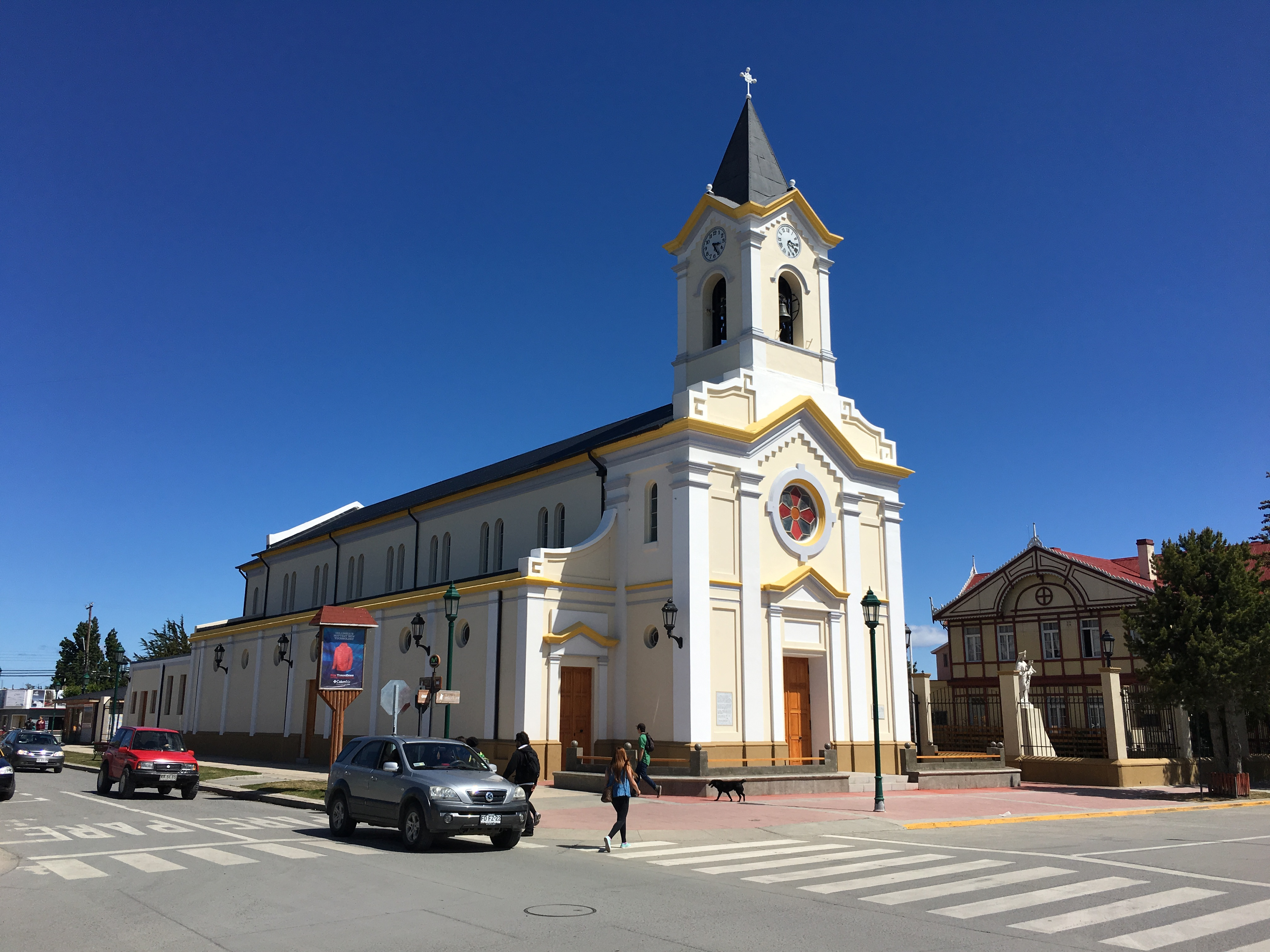
Parish Church of Puerto Natales

According to the 2002 census carried out by the Chilean National Statistics Institute, the Natales commune has a population of 19,116 inhabitants (10,068 men and 9,048 women). Of these, 16,978 (88.8%) lived in the city's urban area and 2,138 (11.2%) in rural areas. The population grew by 10.7% (1,841 persons) between the 1992 and 2002 censuses. The commune comprises 96.3% of the province's total population of 19,855. Its population density is only 0.38/km^{2} (0.98/sq mi).

== Geography ==
Puerto Natales is situated along the shore of Última Esperanza Sound and has views northward into the Cerro Benitez peaks of the Cerro Toro formation within the Cordillera Manuel Señoret.

The city of Puerto Natales exists within the larger Natales commune, one of eleven communes in the Magallanes Region. Since the entire province of Última Esperanza (56,554 km^{2} (21,836 sq mi)) is divided into only two communes, the result is a rather large but sparsely populated area for the Natales commune. The commune's area is 48,974.2 km^{2} (18,909 sq mi), which renders it one of the largest communes in Chile, larger than seven regions of the country.

Its altitude is 3 m (10 ft).

=== Climate ===
Puerto Natales has an oceanic climate (Köppen: Cfb/Cfc), with cool, short summers, and chilly, wet winters. It is the city with most rainy days per year in Chile, averaging 161.

Climate data for Puerto Natales (1991–2020, extremes 1991–present (Note: Please enter the value "510005" in the parameter "Estación"))
Month	Jan	Feb	Mar	Apr	May	Jun	Jul	Aug	Sep	Oct	Nov	Dec	Year
Record high °C (°F)	27.2 (81.0)	30.0 (86.0)	28.6 (83.5)	24.1 (75.4)	18.5 (65.3)	18.4 (65.1)	16.1 (61.0)	16.8 (62.2)	19.8 (67.6)	20.3 (68.5)	26.5 (79.7)	24.8 (76.6)	30.0 (86.0)
Mean daily maximum °C (°F)	18.8 (65.8)	18.1 (64.6)	18.1 (64.6)	14.3 (57.7)	10.9 (51.6)	6.9 (44.4)	7.7 (45.9)	8.9 (48.0)	12.2 (54.0)	14.0 (57.2)	15.6 (60.1)	17.2 (63.0)	13.6 (56.4)
Daily mean °C (°F)	11.6 (52.9)	11.5 (52.7)	10.1 (50.2)	6.7 (44.1)	3.7 (38.7)	1.9 (35.4)	1.7 (35.1)	2.9 (37.2)	5.2 (41.4)	7.1 (44.8)	8.9 (48.0)	10.5 (50.9)	6.8 (44.3)
Mean daily minimum °C (°F)	4.5 (40.1)	4.2 (39.6)	2.6 (36.7)	−0.3 (31.5)	−2.9 (26.8)	−4.0 (24.8)	−4.0 (24.8)	−3.3 (26.1)	−0.5 (31.1)	−1.6 (29.1)	2.0 (35.6)	3.8 (38.8)	0.0 (32.1)
Record low °C (°F)	−2.4 (27.7)	−7.4 (18.7)	−6.8 (19.8)	−8.8 (16.2)	−10.4 (13.3)	−13.1 (8.4)	−18.8 (−1.8)	−10.8 (12.6)	−8.2 (17.2)	−8.0 (17.6)	−4.1 (24.6)	−4.1 (24.6)	−18.8 (−1.8)
Average precipitation mm (inches)	147 (5.8)	120 (4.7)	145 (5.7)	154 (6.1)	119 (4.7)	105 (4.1)	104 (4.1)	107 (4.2)	103 (4.1)	127 (5.0)	154 (6.1)	155 (6.1)	1,540 (60.7)
Average precipitation days	16	13	15	13	12	12	12	12	12	13	15	16	161
Average relative humidity (%)	73	74	76	81	85	86	85	83	80	74	73	72	79
Mean daily sunshine hours	7.6	7.0	6.0	4.9	4.4	3.8	3.9	5.1	5.8	6.8	7.5	7.6	5.9
Source 1: Dirección Meteorológica de Chile (normal temperatures and extremes)
Source 2: Climate-Data.org

== Administration ==
The city of Puerto Natales is the capital of the Natales commune and the Última Esperanza Province. As a commune, Natales is a third-level administrative division of Chile administered by a municipal council, headed by an alcalde who is directly elected every four years. The 2016-2020 alcalde is Fernando Paredes Mansilla (UDI), and the councilors are:

- Ana Mayorga Bahamonde (UDI)
- Veronica Pérez Magdalena (IND-UDI)
- Daniel Cordova Cordova (IND-UDI)
- Alfredo Alderete Flores (IND-Nueva Mayoría)
- José Cuyul Rogel (PS)
- Guillermo Ruiz Santana (PS)

Within the electoral divisions of Chile, Puerto Natales is represented in the Chamber of Deputies by Carolina Goic (PDC) and Miodrag Marinovic (Ind.) as part of the 60th electoral district, which includes the entire Magallanes and Antartica Chilena Region. The commune is represented in the Senate by Carlos Bianchi Chelech (Ind.) and Pedro Muñoz Aburto (PS) as part of the 19th senatorial constituency (Magallanes Region).

== Gallery ==
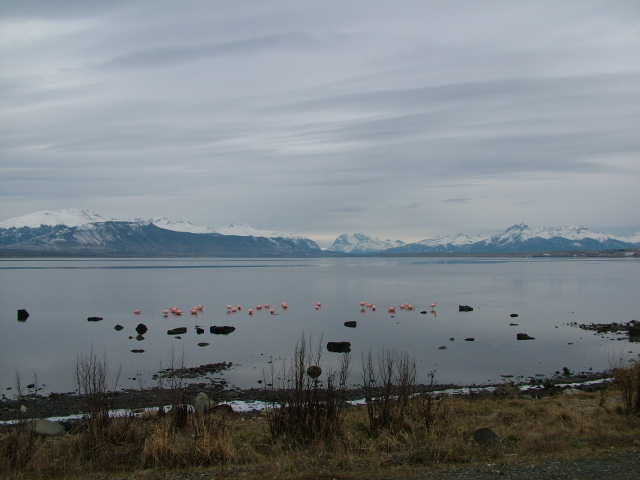
Flamingos in Puerto Natales

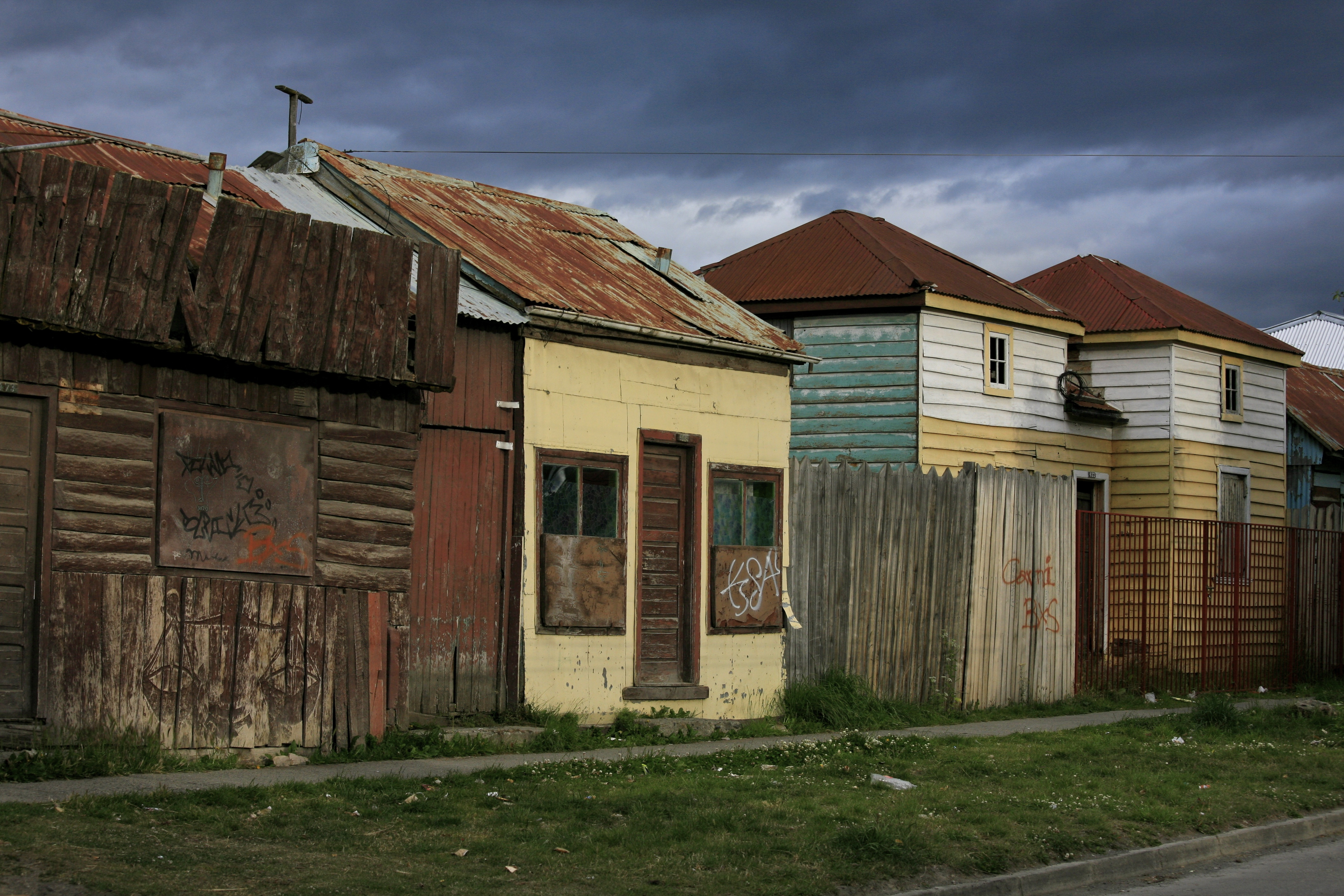
Typical houses in Puerto Natales

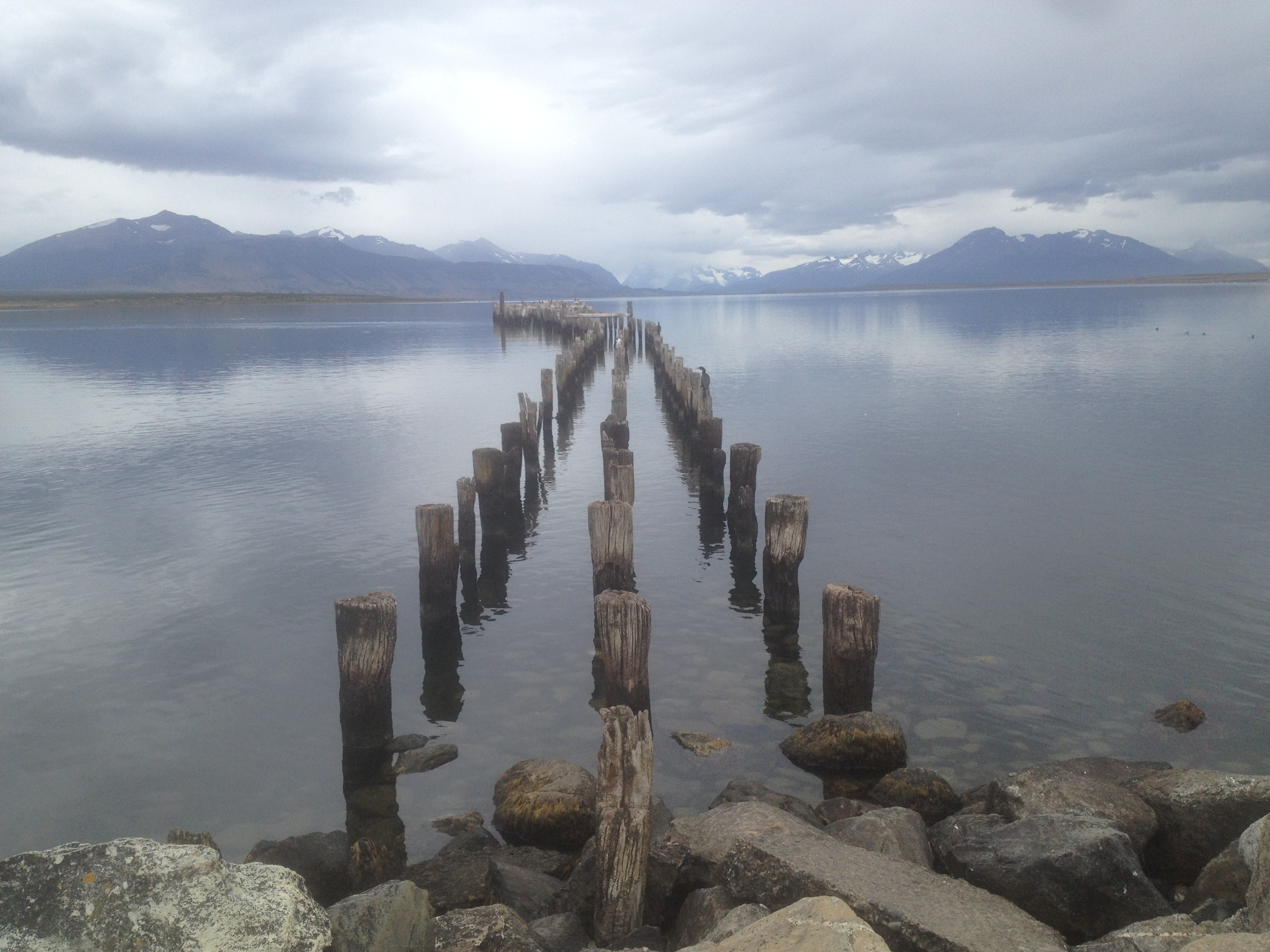
A pier

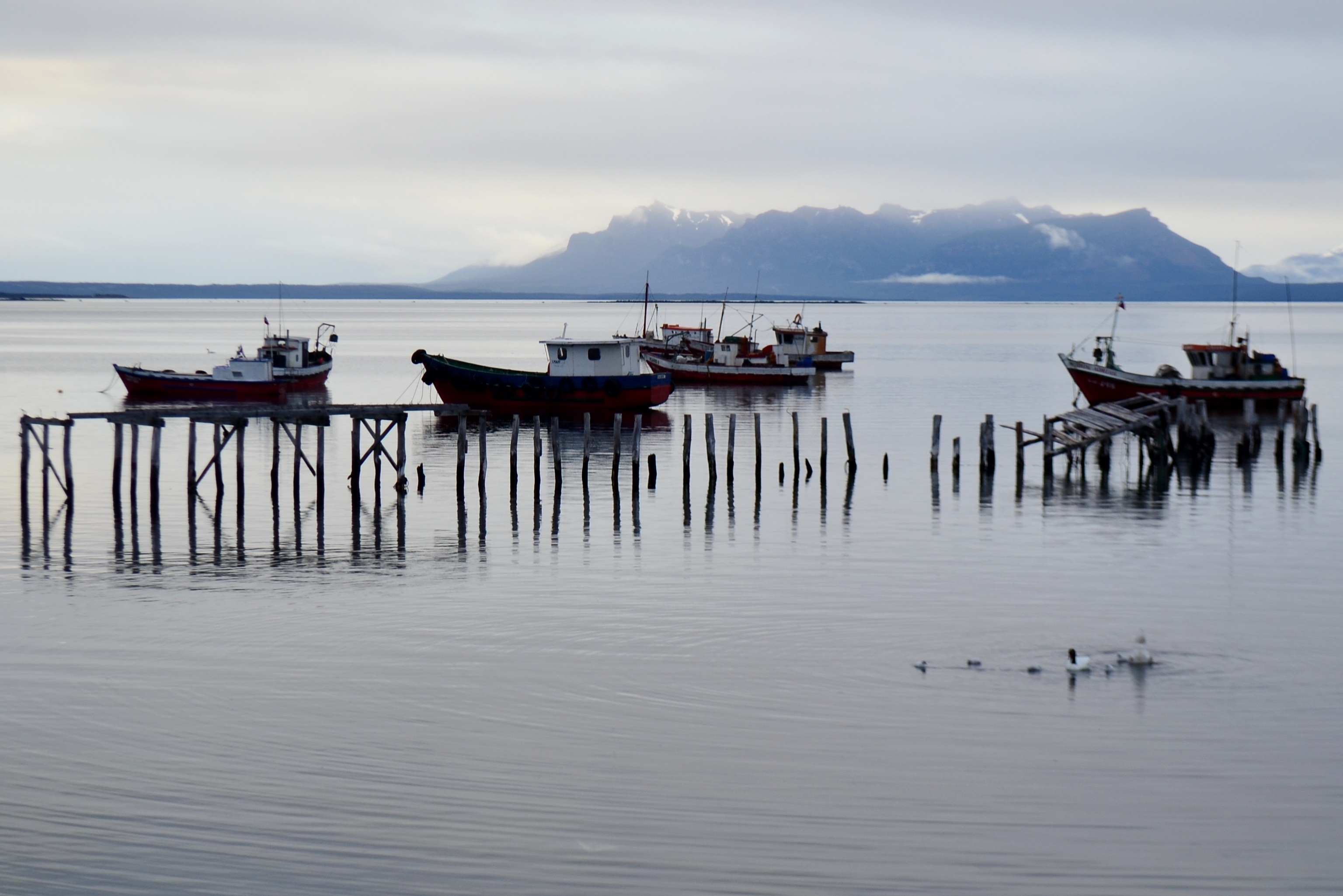
A view of the city

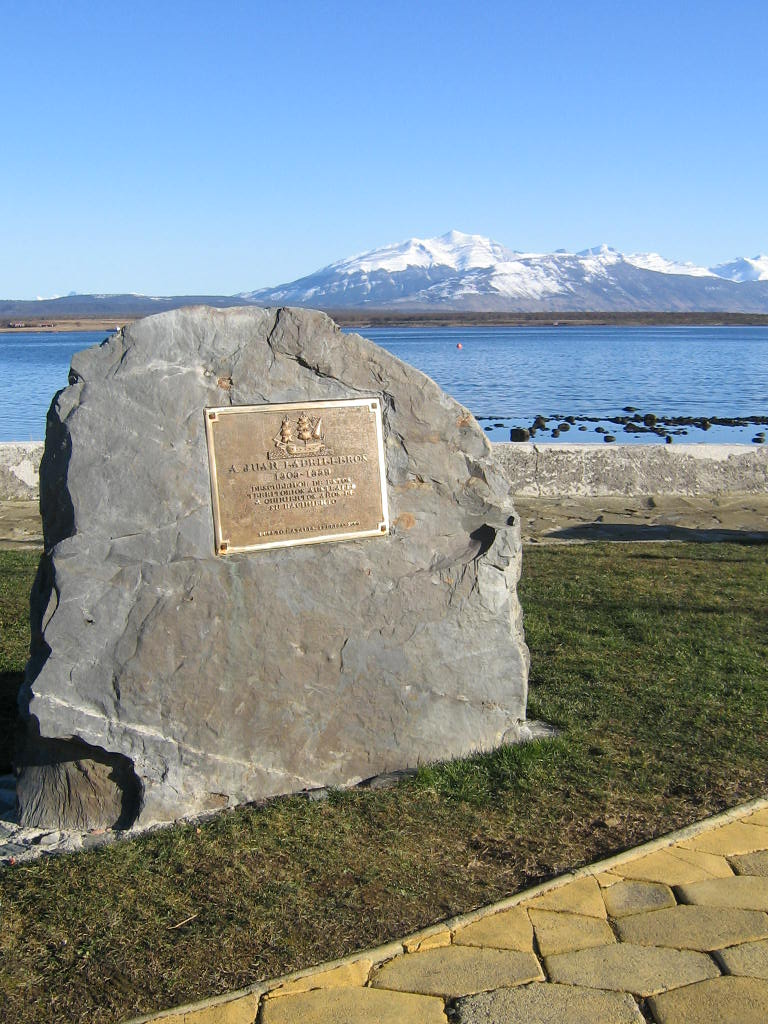
Monument to explorer Juan Ladrillero in Puerto Natales

== See also ==
- Cueva del Milodón Natural Monument
- Muñoz Gamero Peninsula
- Torres del Paine National Park
