= Cordillera Riesco =

Mountain range in Chile

Coordinates: 52°04′S 73°12′W

The Cordillera Riesco is a mountain range located in the Chilean Patagonia to the west of Puerto Natales. It extends in north–south direction on the eastern shore of the Fjord of the Mountains and parallel to the Cordillera Sarmiento. The rock towers of the "Grupo La Paz" are the centerpiece of this mountain range. The range includes the Cerro Toro formation, within which the Cueva del Milodon Natural Monument is situated; this monument comprises a cave complex where remains of the extinct Giant sloth have been recovered along with evidence of occupation by prehistoric man.

== See also ==
- Eberhard Fjord
