= Fjord of the Mountains =

- Channel of the Mountains; Canal de las Montañas
- Interactive map of Fjord of the Mountains
- Location: Alacalufes National Reserve, west of Puerto Natales, Chile
- Coordinates: 51.80°S 73.31°W
- Type: Fjord
- Basin countries: Chile

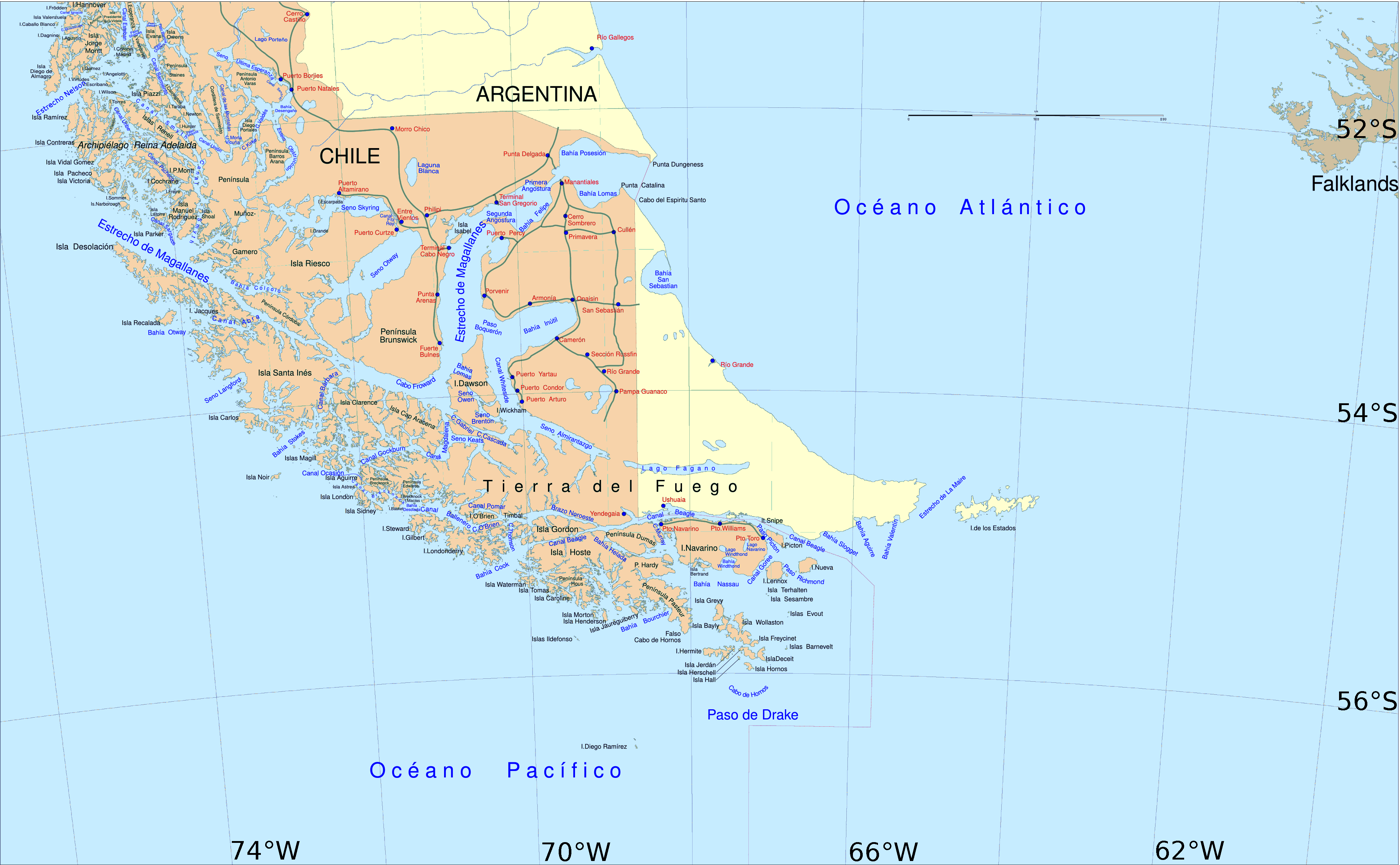
Canal de las Montañas in the middle of the image. Click on the image to obtain the big map

Fjord of the Mountains, also known as "Channel of the Mountains" (Spanish Canal de las Montañas), is located to the west of Puerto Natales, Chile and inside the boundaries of the Alacalufes National Reserve. It stretches 66 km from north to south and is flanked by two mountain ranges, the Cordillera Sarmiento to the west and the Cordillera Riesco to the east.

== See also ==
- Seno Ultima Esperanza
