= Magallanes Region =

First-level administrative division of Chile

Magallanes and the Chilean Antarctica Region Región de Magallanes y de la Antártica Chilena
- Region
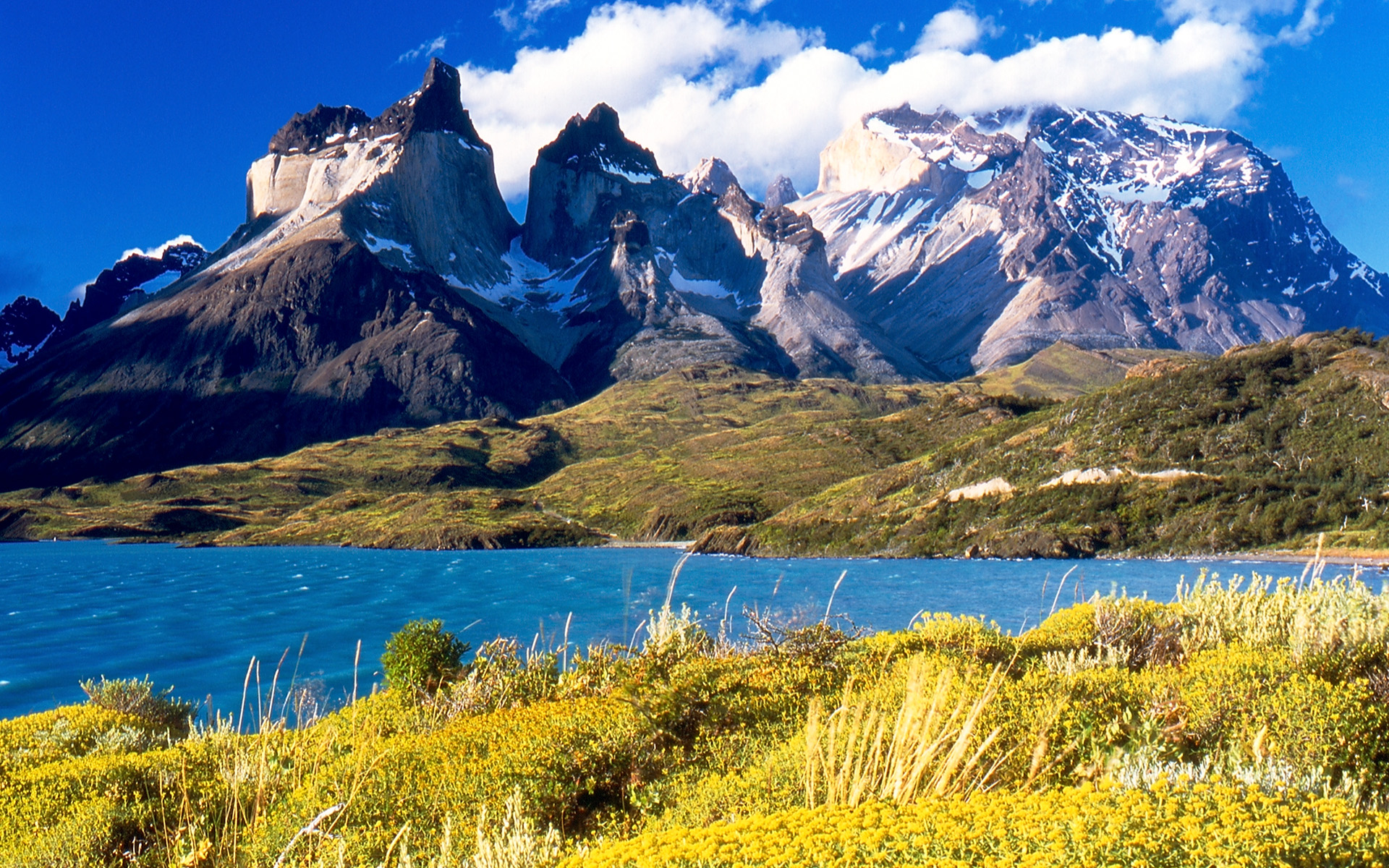
- Torres del Paine National Park

- Flag Seal Coat of arms
- Motto(s): "Prima en Terra Chilensis" (Latin for First in Chilean Land)
- Map of Magallanes and Chilean Antarctica Region

- Magallanes without the Antarctican Region
- Coordinates: 53°10′S 70°56′W
- Country: Chile
- Capital: Punta Arenas
- Provinces: Magallanes, Chilean Antarctica, Tierra del Fuego, Última Esperanza

Government
  - Governor: Jorge Flies Añón (IND)

Area (Note: Total area listed here is the continental Magallanes region. With the Chilean Antarctic Territory, the total area is 1,382,291.10 square kilometres (533,705.58 sq mi).)
  - Total: 132,291.1 km^{2} (51,077.9 sq mi)
  - Rank: 1
- Highest elevation: 3,623 m (11,886 ft)
- Lowest elevation: 0 m (0 ft)

Population (2024 census) (Note: If the Chilean Antarctic Territory is considered, the population density of the Magallanes Region is 0.13 square kilometres (0.050 sq mi).)
  - Total: 166,537
  - Rank: 15
  - Density: 1.25887/km^{2} (3.26045/sq mi)

GDP (PPP)
  - Total: $3.021 billion (2014)
  - Per capita: $18,447 (2014)
- ISO 3166 code: CL-MA
- HDI (2022): 0.872 very high
- Website: Official website (in Spanish)

The Magallanes Region (locally [maɣaˈʝanes]), officially the Magallanes and the Chilean Antarctica Region (Spanish: Región de Magallanes y de la Antártica Chilena) is one of Chile's 16 first order administrative divisions. It is the southernmost, largest, and second least populated region of Chile. It comprises four provinces: Última Esperanza, Magallanes, Tierra del Fuego, and Antártica Chilena. The region takes its name from the Strait of Magellan which runs through it, which was in turn named after Ferdinand Magellan, the leader of the European expedition that discovered it.

Magallanes's geographical features include Torres del Paine, Cape Horn, Tierra del Fuego island, and the Strait of Magellan. It also includes the Antarctic territory claimed by Chile. Despite its large area, much of the land in the region is rugged or closed off for sheep farming, and is unsuitable for settlement. 80% of the population lives in the capital Punta Arenas, a major market city and one of the main hubs for Antarctic exploration.

The main economic activities are sheep farming, oil extraction, and tourism. It is also the region with the lowest poverty level in Chile (5.8%); households in Magallanes have the highest income of any region in Chile.

Since 2017, the region has had its own time zone. It uses the summer time for the whole year (UTC−3).

== Geography ==
Chile, including its territorial claims in Antarctica

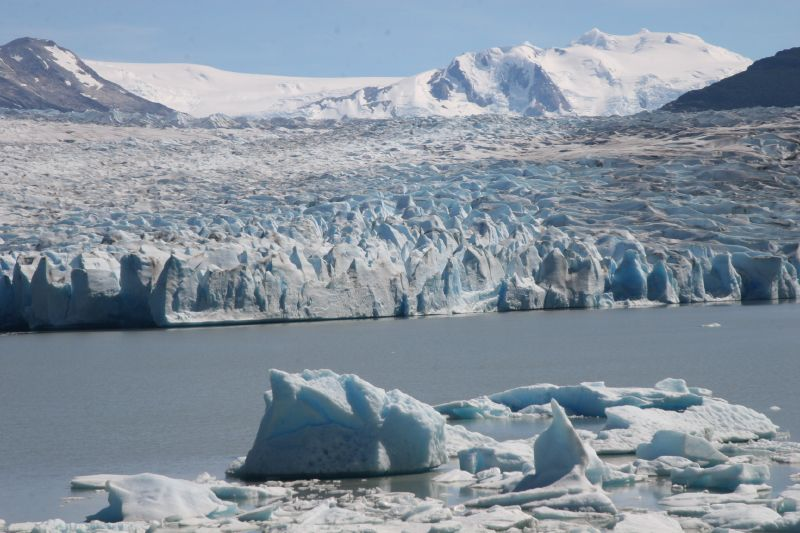
Grey Glacier

The region contains mountainous peaks and glaciers in the far north, including elements of the Patagonian Ice Sheet. Further south there are other mountain ranges such as the Cerro Toro and numerous surface waters including the Seno Última Esperanza, Eberhard Fjord and Lago Grey. Protected areas include the Torres del Paine National Park and the Cueva del Milodon Natural Monument. At the latter, remains have been discovered of the extinct ground sloth as well as of prehistoric man dating to circa 10,000 BC.

The topography can be divided in four regions: an outer archipelago region (Spanish: Región Archipielágica) to the west and south, a mountain region in the west and south (Spanish: Región Cordillerana), a plains region (Spanish: Región de las Planicies Orientales) in the northeast plus a sub-Andean zone in-between the last two zones (Spanish: Región Sub-Andina Oriental).

== Climate ==
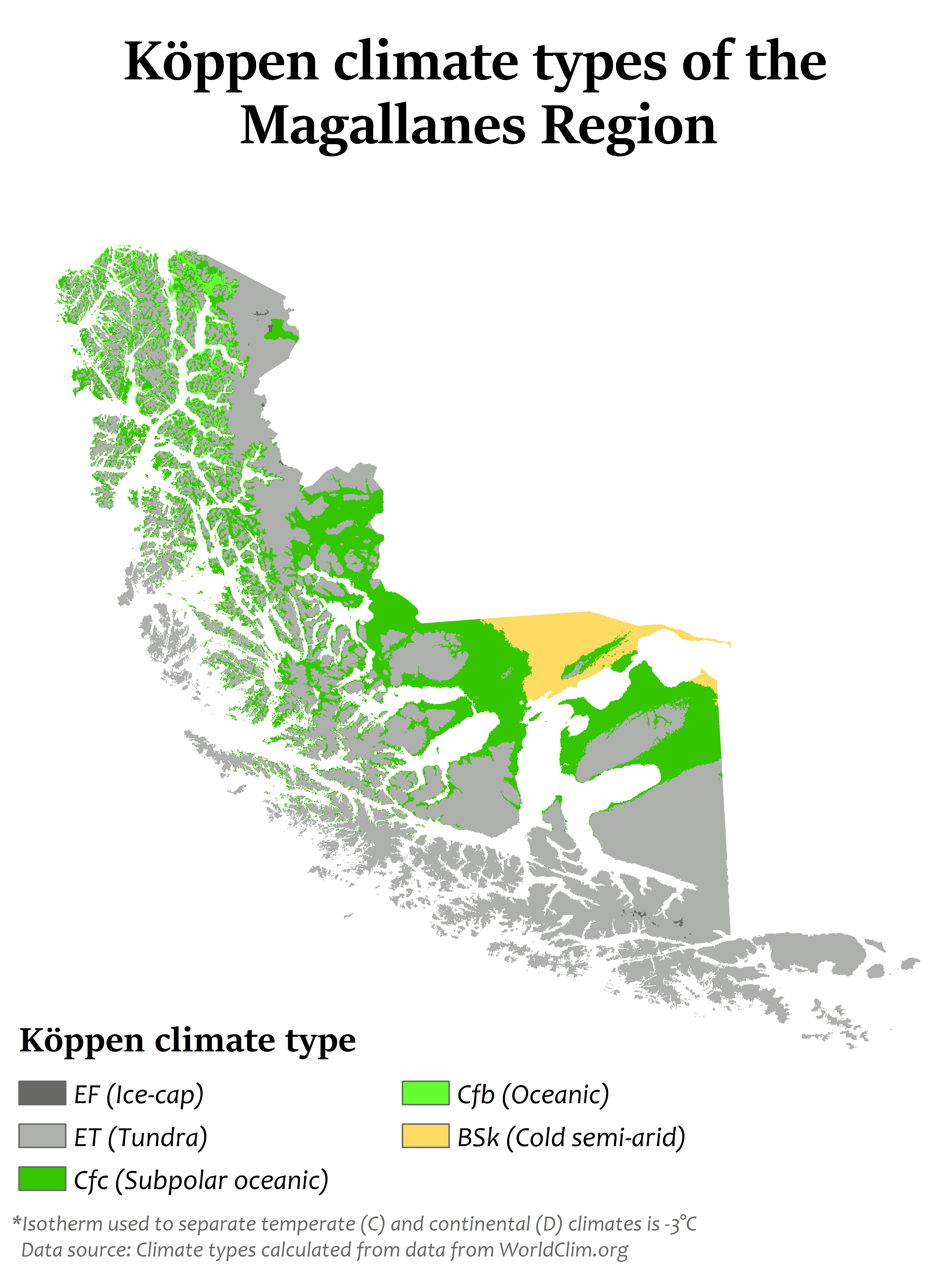
Köppen climate types in the Magallanes Region

The region is characterized by low temperatures and strong winds throughout the year. The region has five different climatic types, owing to the diversity in altitudes and the width of the region. Owing to its proximity to 60°S (a zone characterized by low pressure systems and subpolar cyclones), frontal systems regularly pass through the region.

The westernmost islands have a cold, humid and rainy climate, being exposed to strong winds and low temperatures throughout the year. Precipitation averages 3,500 mm (140 in) per year, while the mean annual temperature on these islands is 9 °C (48.2 °F) with a low thermal amplitude due to the maritime influences and the strong winds. Precipitation decreases and temperatures increase moving eastwards. These islands are the wettest places in Chile, particularly on Guarello Island where it can record 9,000 mm (350 in) during the wettest years. Precipitation is high throughout the year though fall tends to be the wettest season.

Immediately to the east of the westernmost islands, east of the Andes and bordered by the Cordillera Paine to the north and the Brunswick Peninsula to the south, the climate is much drier. The Andes to the west block most of the precipitation, causing most of the air coming in to be dry. Mean annual precipitation ranges between 250 and 400 mm (9.8 and 15.7 in) which is fairly evenly distributed through the year. During winters, precipitation mainly falls as snow. Mean annual temperatures are between 6 and 7 °C (42.8 and 44.6 °F). Due to the close proximity to the ocean, winters are not cold and snow cover does not last long.

In the easternmost parts of the region, including much of Tierra del Fuego province, a cold steppe climate prevails. Temperatures are cold while precipitation is lower than areas to the west. Mean precipitation is between 250 and 500 mm (9.8 and 19.7 in), decreasing eastwards and is fairly evenly distributed throughout the year. Mean annual temperatures range between 8 and 9 °C (46.4 and 48.2 °F). From December to March, mean temperatures exceed 10 °C (50.0 °F) while during winter, they reach down to 2 °C (35.6 °F).

Corresponding to the Southern Patagonian Ice Field, located at higher altitudes, temperatures are cold enough to maintain permanent ice fields. Mean temperatures are below 0 °C (32.0 °F) in all months while precipitation (mostly as snow) is abundant year-round, receiving 2,000 mm (79 in). These areas have a polar climate.

In the southernmost islands, south of Tierra del Fuego and the Strait of Magellan, a tundra climate prevails. These islands are strongly influenced by the surrounding Pacific Ocean to the west and southwest and the Drake Passage to the south, resulting in constant temperatures throughout the year. Mean annual temperatures are between 5 and 7 °C (41.0 and 44.6 °F) while precipitation is high, with most places receiving 1,000 mm (39 in). In sheltered areas, precipitation is below 600 mm (24 in). Summers are the warmest and the wettest season in these islands.

== Provinces and communes ==
Magellan and Chilean Antarctica Region
Province	Commune	Area (km2)	Population 2002 Census	Population 2012 Census	Commune website
Antártica Chilena	Antártica	1,250,000	130	115	link
Antártica Chilena	Cabo de Hornos	15,854	2,262	1,677	link
Magallanes	San Gregorio	6,884	1,158	384	link
Magallanes	Río Verde	9,975	358	153	link
Magallanes	Punta Arenas	17,846	119,496	127,454	link
Magallanes	Laguna Blanca	3,696	663	208	link
Tierra del Fuego	Timaukel	10,996	423	204	link
Tierra del Fuego	Primavera	4,614	1,016	545	link
Tierra del Fuego	Porvenir	6,983	5,465	5,907	link
Última Esperanza	Torres del Paine	6,470	739	180	link
Última Esperanza	Natales	48,974	19,116	18,505	link

== Demographics ==
The population of Magallanes is one of the lowest in Chile, as one of the last regions colonized.

In the 1854 census counted 158 settlers, concentrated in Punta Arenas. The native population in 1830, according to King, amounted to approximately 2,200, with about 400 in western Patagonia and approximately 1,600 in the southern Straits.

The census of 1875 recorded 1,144 inhabitants and in 1895 the population had risen to 5,170 inhabitants, mostly concentrated in the city of Punta Arenas and its surroundings.

The installation of the cattle ranches attracted people from Europe (mostly Croats, British, Swiss and Italians) and southern Chile (mostly from Chiloé Archipelago), which greatly increased the population of the region.

Punta Arenas is said to have the largest percentage of Croatians in the world outside Croatia and the former Yugoslavia; Punta Arenas also has the largest percentage of residents of British descent in Chile. There is a higher proportion of non-Spanish Europeans there as well (especially Scots and Greeks), and descendants of Germans, Dutch, Danes and other Scandinavians, Russians and Portuguese peoples.

From the late 18th century to the opening of the Panama Canal in 1914, thousands of trans-oceanic voyages stopped by Punta Arenas as the most convenient strait between the Atlantic and Pacific oceans. The settlement of Punta Arenas and the Magellan and Chilean Antarctica Region is a result of its historic use as a hub for international travel.

In the 1907 census, the Territory of Magellan had 17,330 inhabitants, distributed as follows: – City of Punta Arenas: 12,785 hab. – Patagonia Chilena: 1,094 hab. – Pen. of Brunswick: 1,062 hab. – Tierra del Fuego: 1,626 hab. – Beagle Channel: 184 inhabitants. – Last Hope: 392 inhabitants. – Baker River: 187 inhabitants.

This proportional distribution has persisted, with the bulk of the regional population in the city of Punta Arenas, and in the provincial capitals Puerto Natales, Porvenir (Spanish for "future") and Puerto Williams, one of the world's southernmost cities.

In the past 50 years, the population has increased moderately as shown below, but the region still has one of the lowest population densities in the country. The population remains mostly urban and concentrated in Punta Arenas.

Census

- 1952: 55,206 hab.
- 1960: 73,358 hab.
- 1970: 89,443 hab.
- 1982: 131,914 hab.
- 1992: 143,198 hab.
- 2002: 150,826 hab.
- 2017: 165,593 hab.
- 2024: 166,537 hab.

The most populated cities are Punta Arenas (132,363 inhabitants), Puerto Natales (24,152) Porvenir (6,809), Cabo de Hornos (1,750) and Primavera (431).

== Education ==
University of Magellan (UMAG) is a university in the southern Chilean city of Punta Arenas. It is part of the Chilean Traditional Universities. The University of Magellan was established in 1981 during the economic reforms of Chile's military regime as the successor of Universidad Técnica del Estado's Punta Arenas section. Universidad Técnica del Estado had established the Punta Arenas section in 1961. The University of Magellan have campuses in Punta Arenas and Puerto Natales as well as a university centre in Puerto Williams. University of Magellan publishes the humanities and social sciences journal Magallania twice a year.

== Gallery ==
Some views of the Magallanes Region

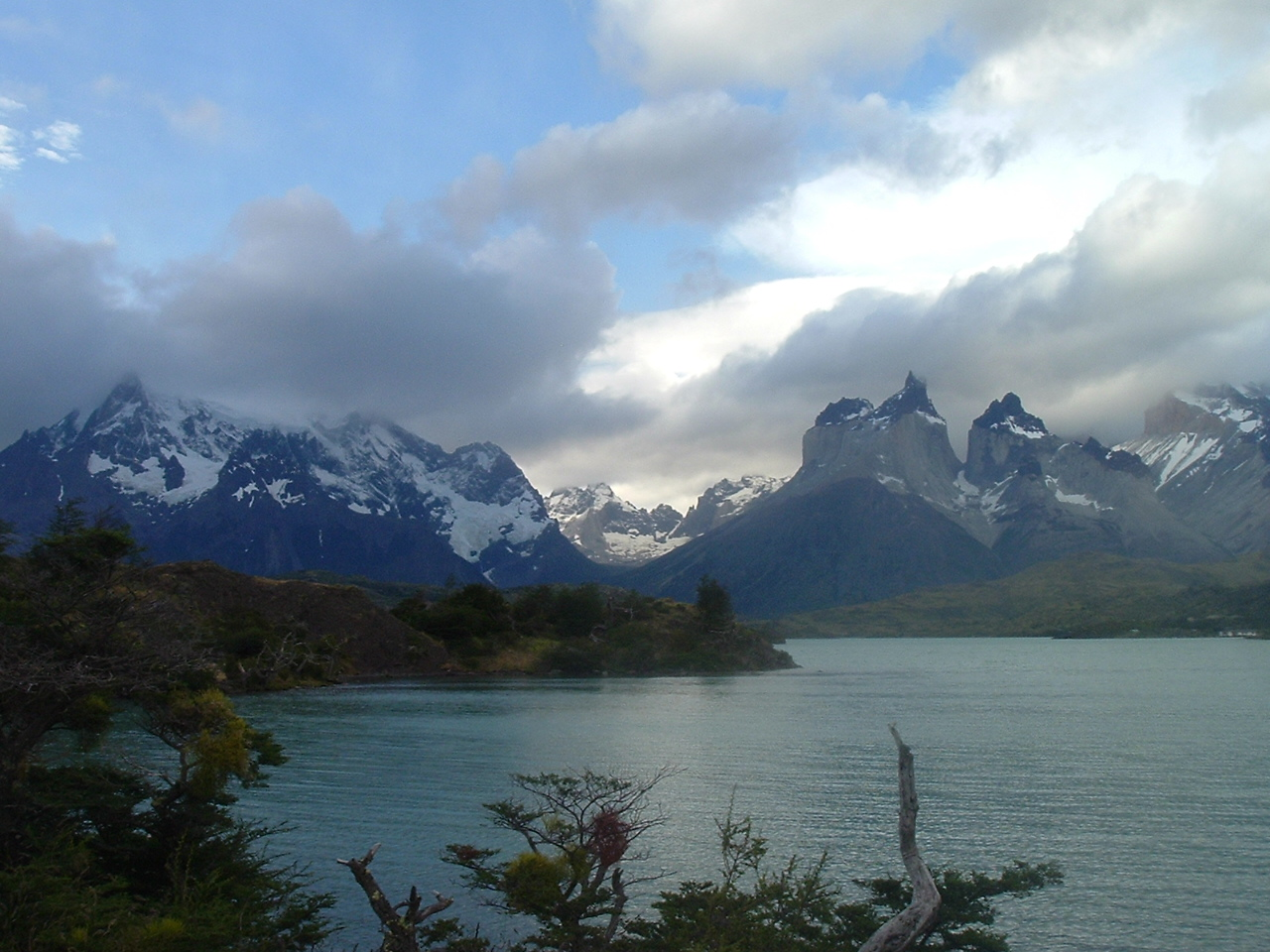
Torres del Paine

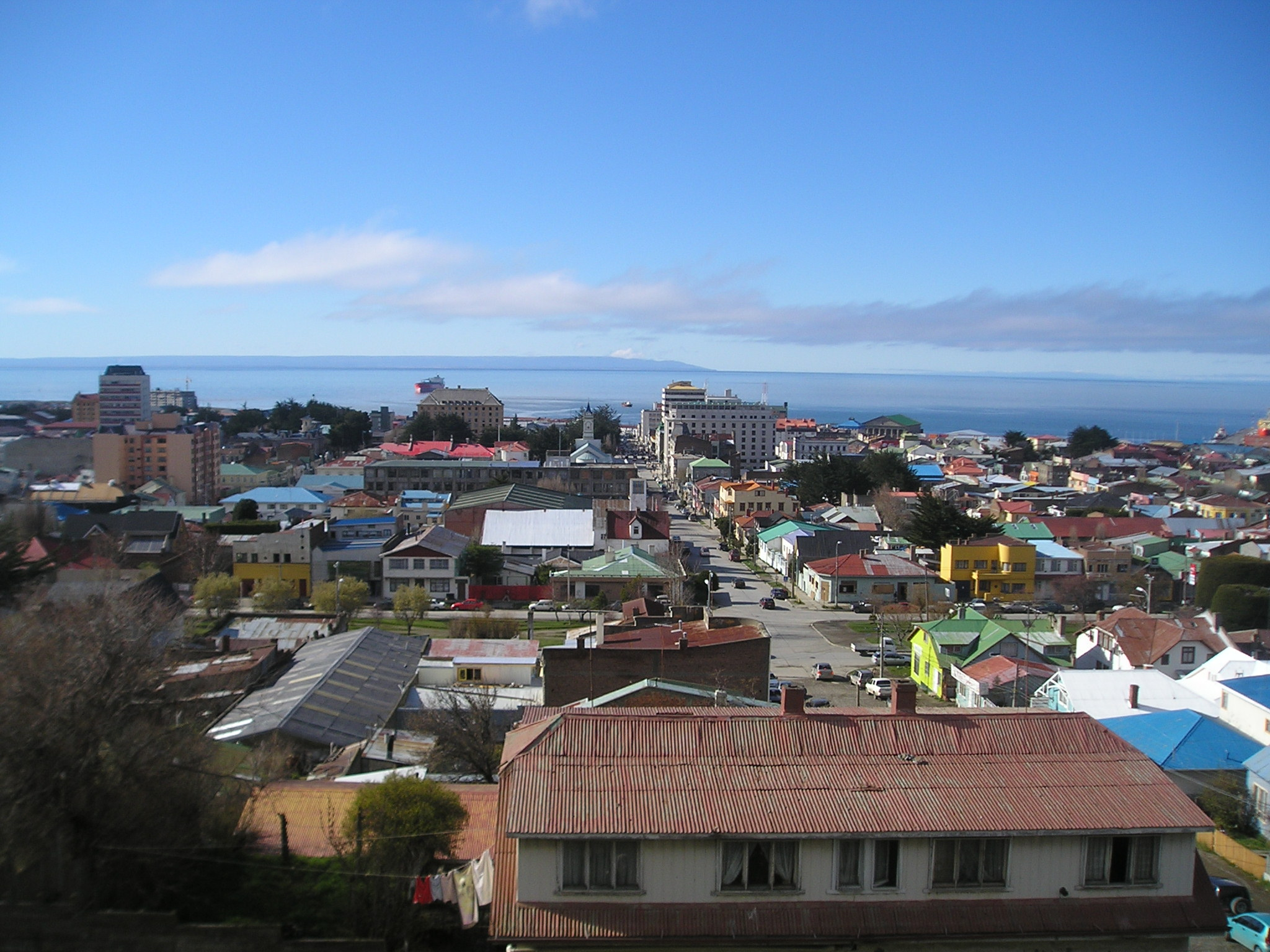
Punta Arenas

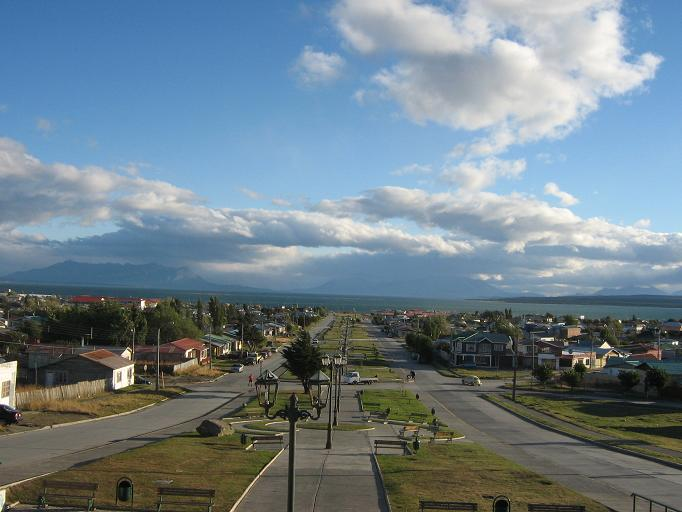
Puerto Natales

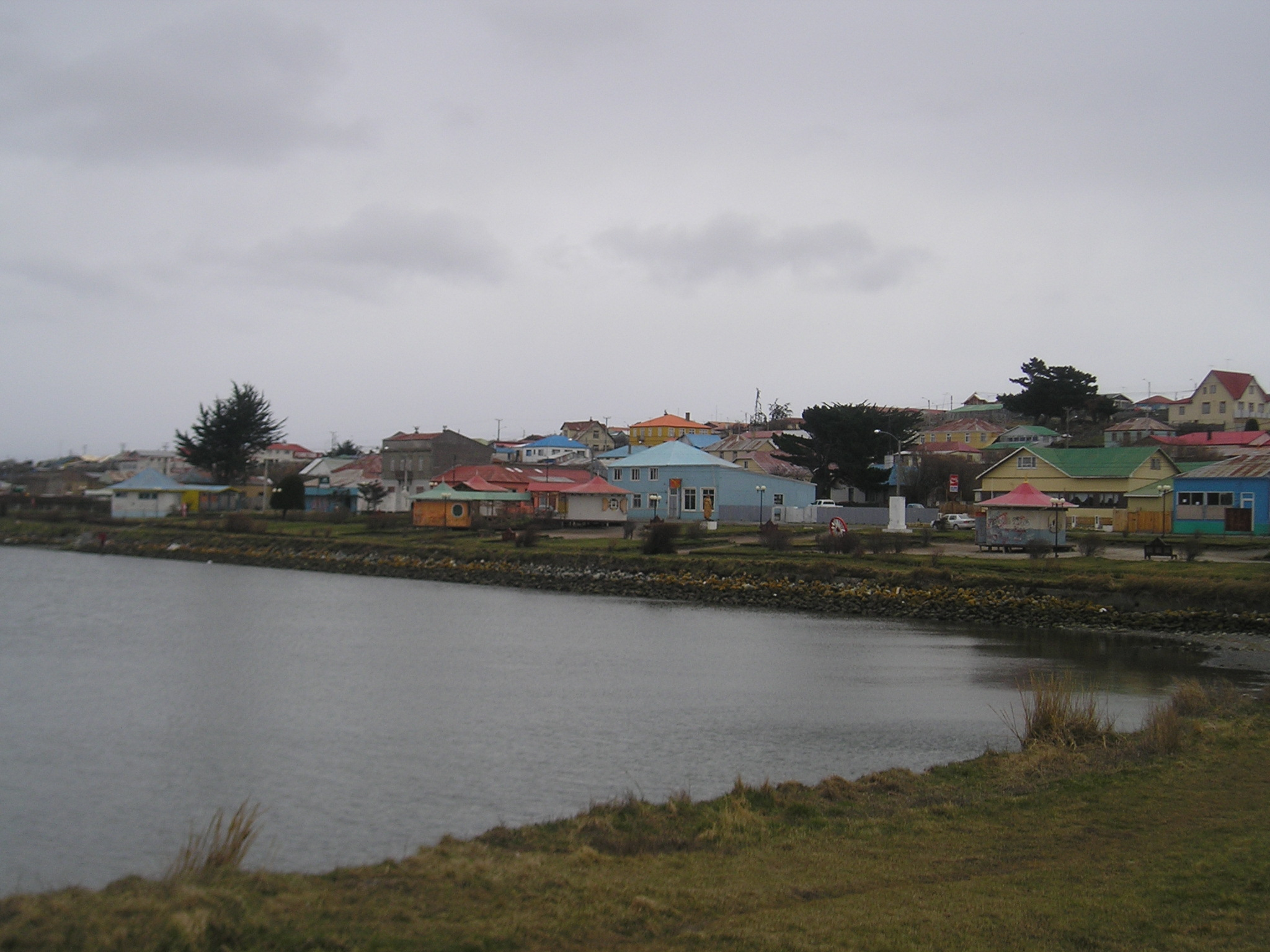
Porvenir

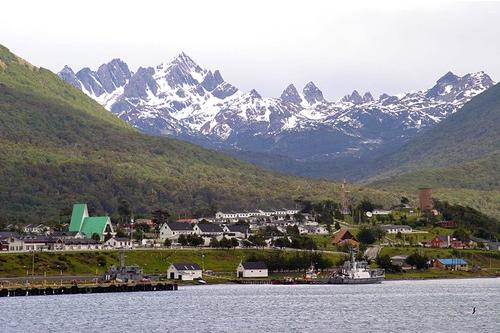
Puerto Williams with Dientes del Navarino in the background

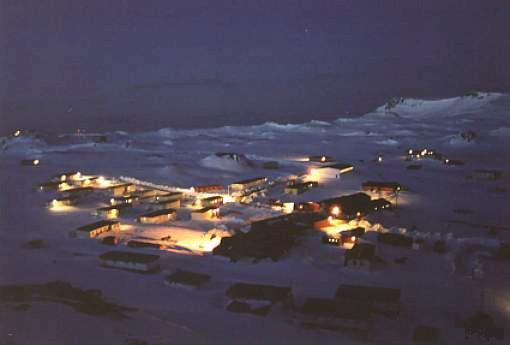
Villa Las Estrellas

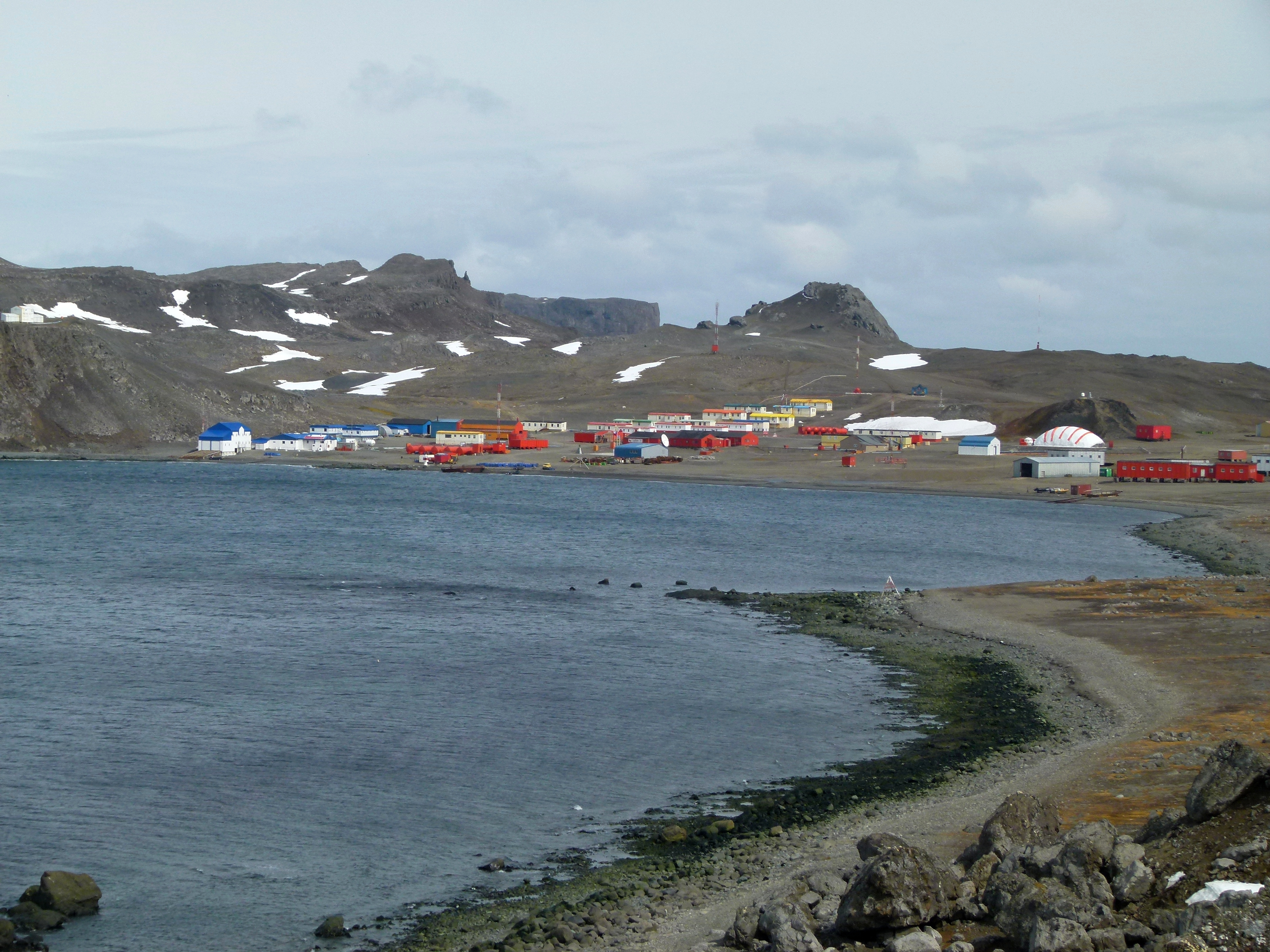
The Chilean settlement of Villa Las Estrellas on King George Island in the South Shetland Islands, Antarctica.

== See also ==
Media related to Category:Magallanes y Antártica Chilena Region at Wikimedia Commons

- Chilean Antarctic Territory
- Cerro Toro
- Eberhard Fjord
- Flag of Magallanes
- Tierra del Fuego Gold Rush
- Governorate of New León
- Southern Patagonian Ice Field dispute
