= Cordillera Sarmiento =

Mountain range in Chilean Patagonia

- Location within Southern Patagonia

Highest point
- Peak: La Dama Blanca
- Elevation: 1,941 m (6,368 ft)
- Coordinates: 51°48′S 73°24′W

Dimensions
- Length: 65 km (40 mi) North-South
- Width: 15 km (9.3 mi) West-East

Geography
- Country: Chile
- State: Magallanes Region

The Cordillera Sarmiento is a mountain range located in the Chilean Patagonia to the west of Puerto Natales named after Pedro Sarmiento de Gamboa, who was a Spanish explorer who navigated the region's waterways between 1579 and 1580. It extends in north–south direction on the western shore of the Fjord of the Mountains and parallel to the Cordillera Riesco. The highest mountain in this range is La Dama Blanca (The White Lady), with an elevation of 1,941 m (6,368 ft), which is located at 51°48′S 73°24′W. It is a subrange of the Andes and has a number of small glaciers.

== Geography ==
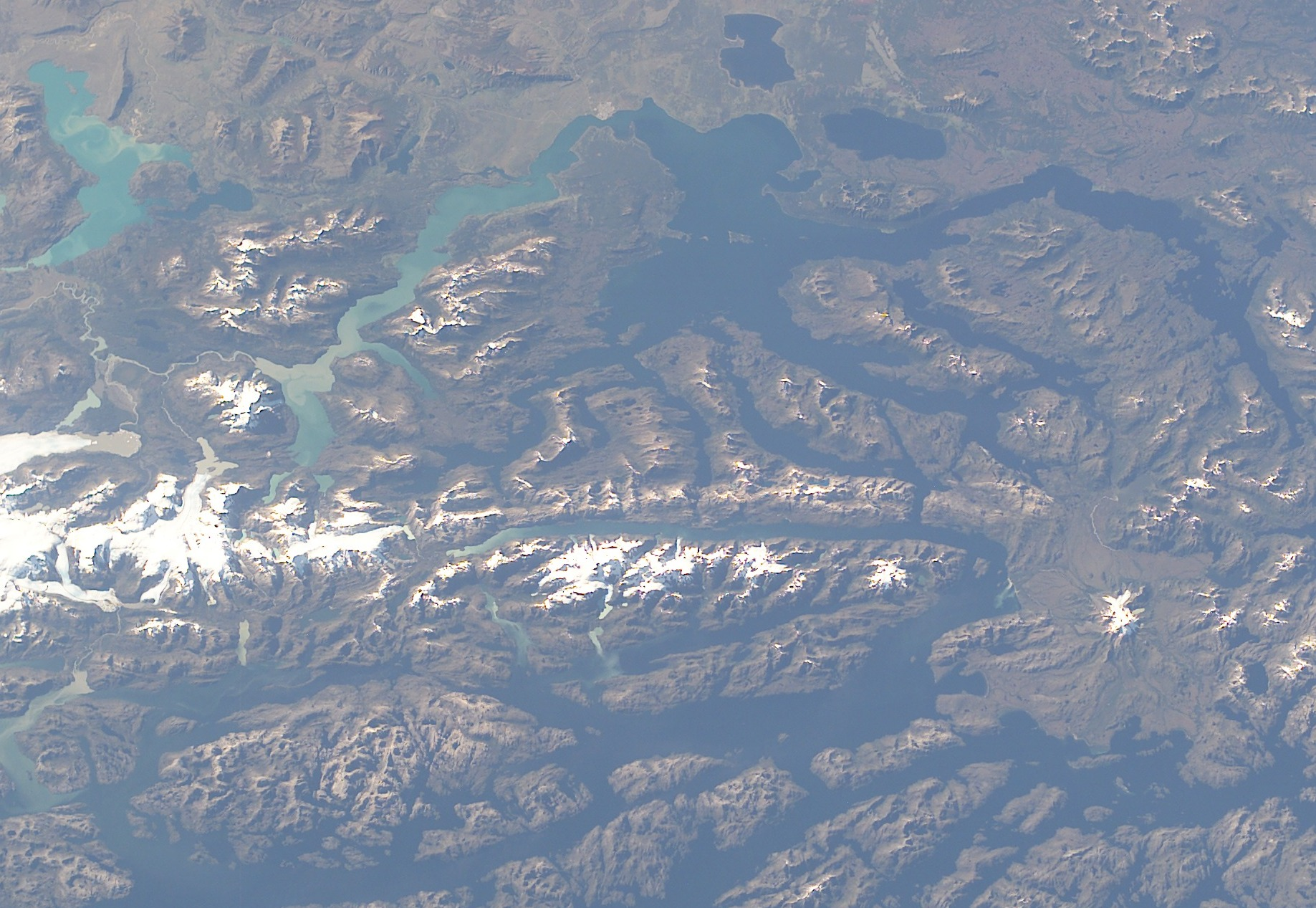
Puerto Natales, Fjordo de las Montanas, Cordillera Sarmiento, Monte Burney (photo from ISS)

A natural continuation of the Southern Patagonian Ice Field, Cordillera de Sarmiento is a mountainous peninsula about 65 kilometres (40 mi) long and 15 kilometres (9.3 mi) wide. The range centers about the 52° South line of latitude, 60 kilometres (37 mi) west of Puerto Natales.

The main summits of the range are La Dama Blanca (1,941 m; 6,368 ft), followed to the south by Cerro Trono (1,879 m; 6,165 ft) and Alas de Ángel (1,767 m; 5,797 ft). Three more summits rise over 1,700 metres (5,600 ft), and many of the peaks are ice-covered towers or sharp rock spires, flanked by vertical walls.

On the official maps of the Chilean IGM (Instituto Geográfico Militar), not a single feature of the Cordillera de Sarmiento has been given a name, in part due to the total lack of human presence in the area. Nevertheless, over the years, explorers and climbers have named the summits, lakes, glaciers, and rivers.

With nearly 2,000 metres (6,600 ft) of jagged relief, the cordillera has a profile somewhat similar to the French Alps, but its glaciation is much more extensive, sending large glacier snouts into tidewater. In recent geological times the ice was thousands of feet thicker, bulldozing the long north–south fjords, rounding out basins in the main massif, and shaving smooth the neighboring ranges.

From the nearby sub-Antarctic waters, the persistent west winds (the Furious Fifties) pick up moist, cold air and plaster the peaks with thick frost. This forms the infamous "cauliflower ice", similar to the rime that forms on peaks bordering the Patagonian Ice Cap, farther north, but much denser and more persistent.

Nearly all ascents, to date, have been on snow and ice. The rock, part of the rare Rocas Verdes formation, originated at the end of the Gondwana super-continent, when Patagonia started to break up and an oceanic basin was formed between the volcanic arc and the continent. The basin filled with large extrusions of basalts, sandstones, shales, and cherts. Still at depth, the rock was metamorphosed and then uplifted to roughly its present position. To all appearances the rock that underpins Sarmiento is solid.

== Early history ==
The rugged lands surrounding these fjords were home of the Kawésqar (Alacalufe) and Yaghan people for thousands of years. Sadly, their names and tales were erased by the relentless and deadly European colonization process.

The range was first recorded in written history by Juan Ladrillero in 1558, but his tales were quickly forgotten as 58 of his 60 men died during that expedition, and the rest, including Ladrillero, died soon afterward. Twenty years later, Pedro Sarmiento de Gamboa followed in Ladrillero's wake and claimed for himself the discovery. Sarmiento originally called the mountain range, now named after him, "cordillera nevada" (snowy range).

Little further exploration was done in these waters for 250 years. In the 1830s, however, as Robert Fitz Roy and his crew explored the southern end of South America in HMS Beagle, they discovered the fjord that gives access to the eastern flanks of Cordillera de Sarmiento. This they called the Canal of the Mountains (now most commonly known as the Fiordo de las Montañas), describing it as "bordered on each side by a steep range of mountains, broken here and there by deep ravines, which were filled with frozen snow, and surmounted by extensive glaciers, whence huge avalanches were continually falling."

== See also ==
- Alacalufes National Reserve
- Sarmiento Channel
