= Hermann Eberhard =

German explorer (1852-1908)

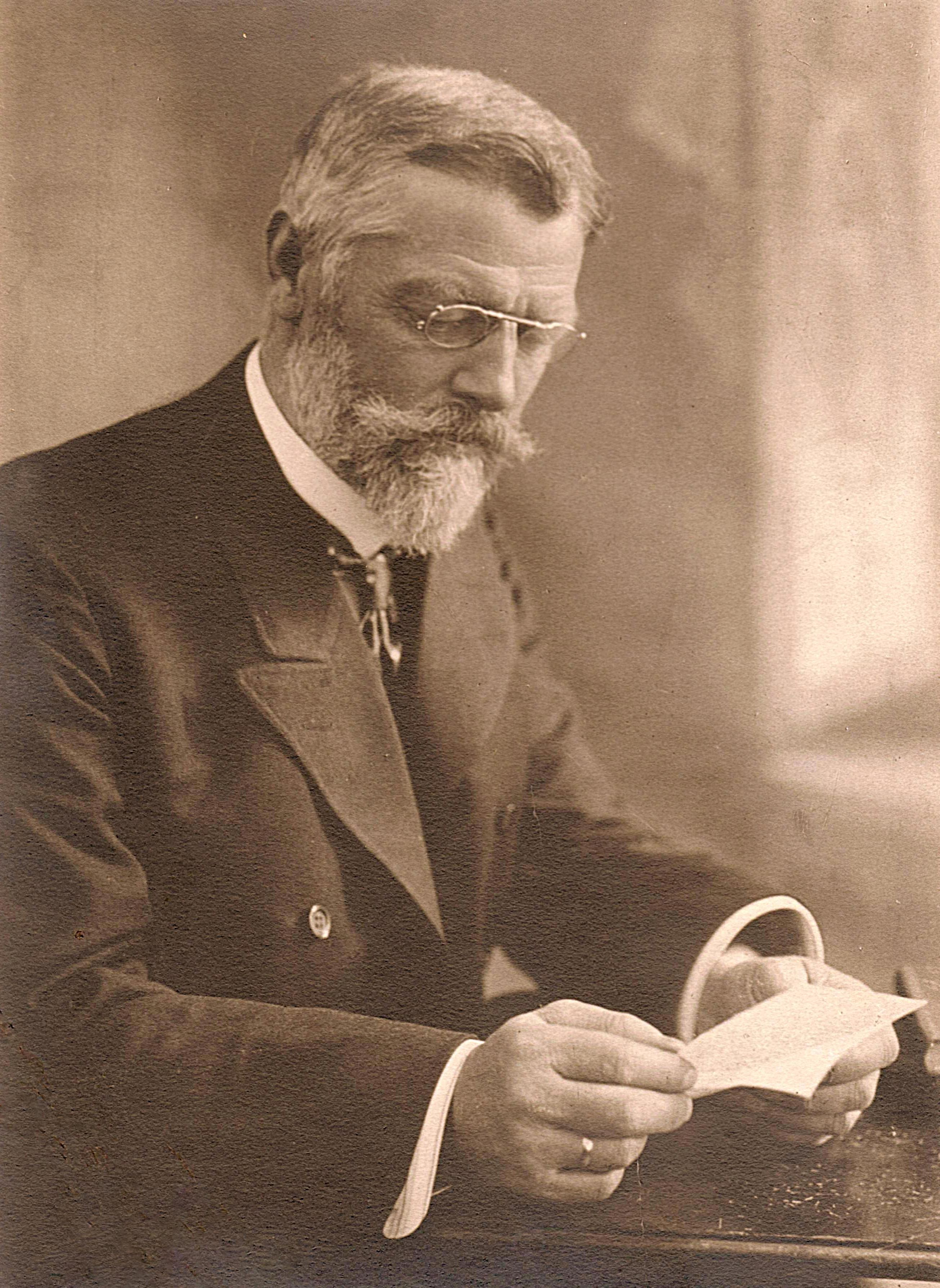
Hermann Eberhard.

Hermann Eberhard (27 February 1852 in Ohlau, Silesia – 30 May 1908) was a 19th-century German explorer credited with western discovery of considerable lands in Patagonia, Chile. Eberhard journeyed by boat up the Última Esperanza Sound to investigate lands previously unknown to Europeans. Eberhard is credited with the discovery of prehistoric remains of the Giant sloth at the Cueva del Milodon Natural Monument.

== See also ==
- Eberhard Fjord
