= Eberhard Fjord =

Chilean fjord of Última Esperanza Sound

Eberhard Fjord is an arm of Seno Ultima Esperanza in the Patagonian region of Chile. This surface water body was named after Hermann Eberhard, the first European to explore this region. Eberhard used the fjord to find the Cueva del Milodón, where he discovered remains of the extinct Giant sloth; archaeological recovery of evidence of prehistoric man was also found at this cave complex. Geologically this fjord is within the Magallanes Basin.

== See also ==
- Cerro Benitez
- Cerro Toro
- Turbio River (Patagonia)
