= Kawésqar National Park =

National park in Chile

- Alacalufes National Reserve
- IUCN category IV (habitat/species management area)
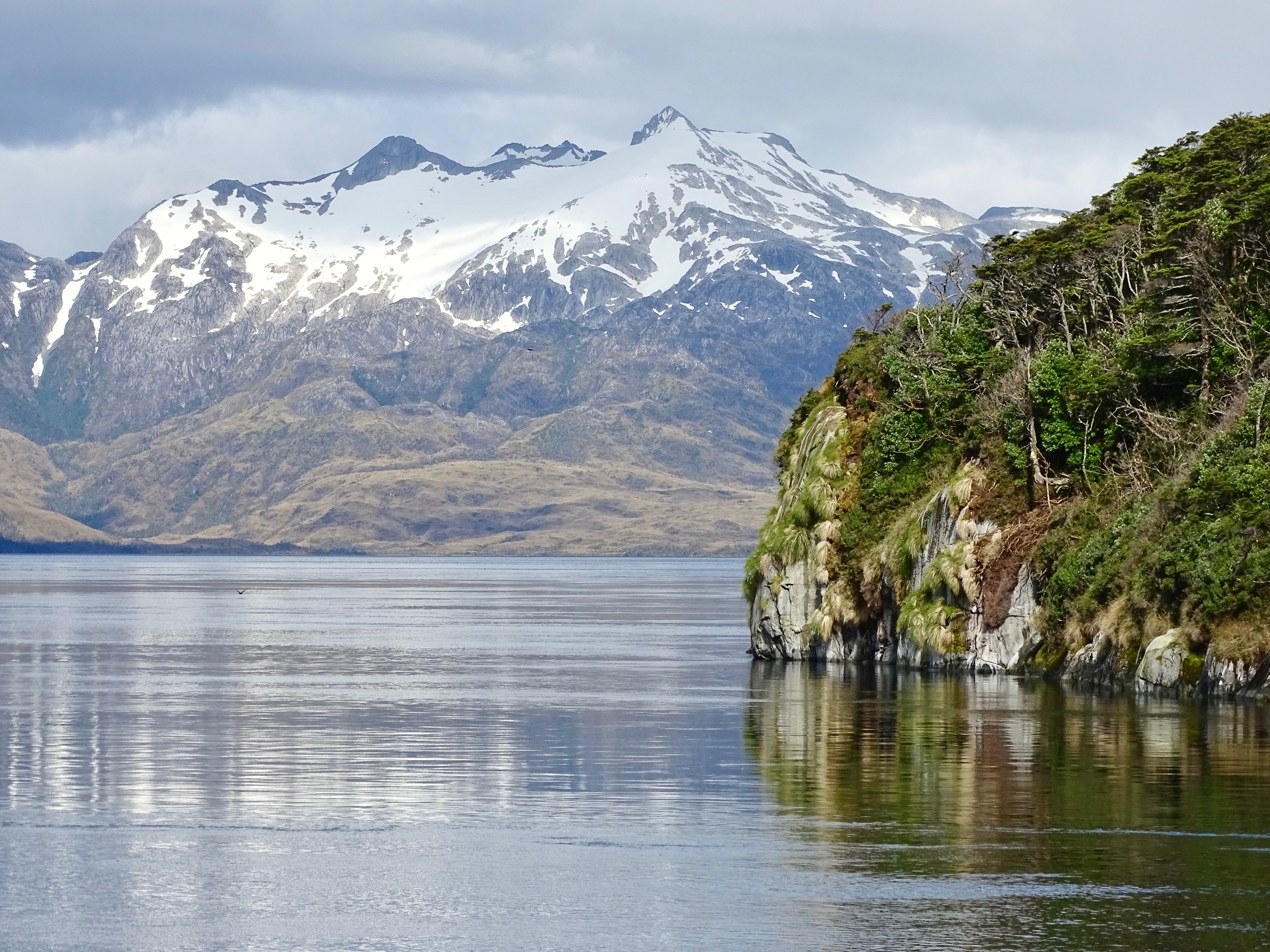
- Seno Ballenas

- Location within Chile
- Location: from Canal Concepción to Chilean Sea through Strait of Magellan, Chile
- Coordinates: 51°51′S 74°19′W (barycenter)
- Area: 7,023,542 acres
- Established: July 22, 1969
- Visitors: 1,742 (in 2016)
- Governing body: Corporación Nacional Forestal

Kawésqar National Park (Spanish: Parque nacional Kawésqar), formerly Alacalufes National Reserve, is the second largest national park in Chile and one of the largest in the world with an area of 7,023,542 acres. It is located between Canal Concepción and the open Pacific Ocean, on both sides of Strait of Magellan in Chile. Its area covers parts of two of the four provinces of Magallanes and Chilean Antártica Region: Magallanes Province and Última Esperanza Province.

== Description ==
There are two types of weather within the national park: "high humidity, mild cold" and, "Isothermal tundra", with a mean temperature of 7.2 °C (45.0 °F) and 6.5 °C (43.7 °F), respectively. Rainfall can reach up to 2,450 mm (96 in) per year.

The park is composed of western archipelagos; its landscape is filled with low mountain-like islands and islets and many channels and fjords. Magellanic rainforest is the dominant ecosystem of the park.

There are around 24 different species of mammal in the park, and the nearby national reserve is home to numerous marine species.

== Culture ==
The Kawésqar people arrived about seven thousand years ago. They were nomadic hunter-gatherers. The park is named in their honor.
