= Porteño Lake =

Lake in Chilean Patagonia

- Location within Southern Patagonia
- Location: Patagonia
- Coordinates: 51°21′S 72°48′W
- Basin countries: Chile

Porteño Lake (Spanish pronunciation: [ˈlaɣo poɾˈteɲo]) is a lake in Chilean Patagonia. Current scientific analysis indicates this surface water body was considerably more extensive in the early Holocene.

== See also ==
- Great Tehuelche Paleolake
- Última Esperanza Sound
