= Cerro Benítez =

Mountain in Chilean Patagonia

Coordinates: 51°33′S 72°36′W

Cerro Benítez ("Benítez hill") is a mountain in the Patagonian region of Chile. In a larger context this feature is an element of the Cerro Toro geological complex. The Cueva del Milodón Natural Monument is situated on the southern flank of Cerro Benítez. The Cerro Benítez is a location for sighting of the Andean condor.

== See also ==
- Señoret Channel
- Silla del Diablo
