= Cerro Toro =

Cretaceous landform in the Magallanes Region, Chile

- Location within Chile

Highest point
- Elevation: 320 m (1,050 ft)
- Coordinates: 52°14′27″S 74°37′57″W

Geography
- Country: Chile
- State: Magallanes y la Antártica Chilena
- Parent range: Andes

Geology
- Orogeny: Andean

Cerro Toro is a Cretaceous landform of the Magallanes Foreland in the Patagonian region of southeastern Chile. The Cerro Toro is an element of the southern Andes and a product of the Andean orogeny, caused by the subduction of the Nazca Plate beneath the South American Plate. The formation of the Cerro Toro began in the Jurassic. The Cueva del Milodón Natural Monument is situated on the southern flank of Cerro Benítez, a lower hill associated with the formation of Cerro Toro.

== See also ==
- Eberhard Fjord
- Magallanes Basin
- Silla del Diablo
