= Cueva del Milodón Natural Monument =

Natural Monument in Magallanes Region, Chile

- IUCN category III (natural monument or feature)
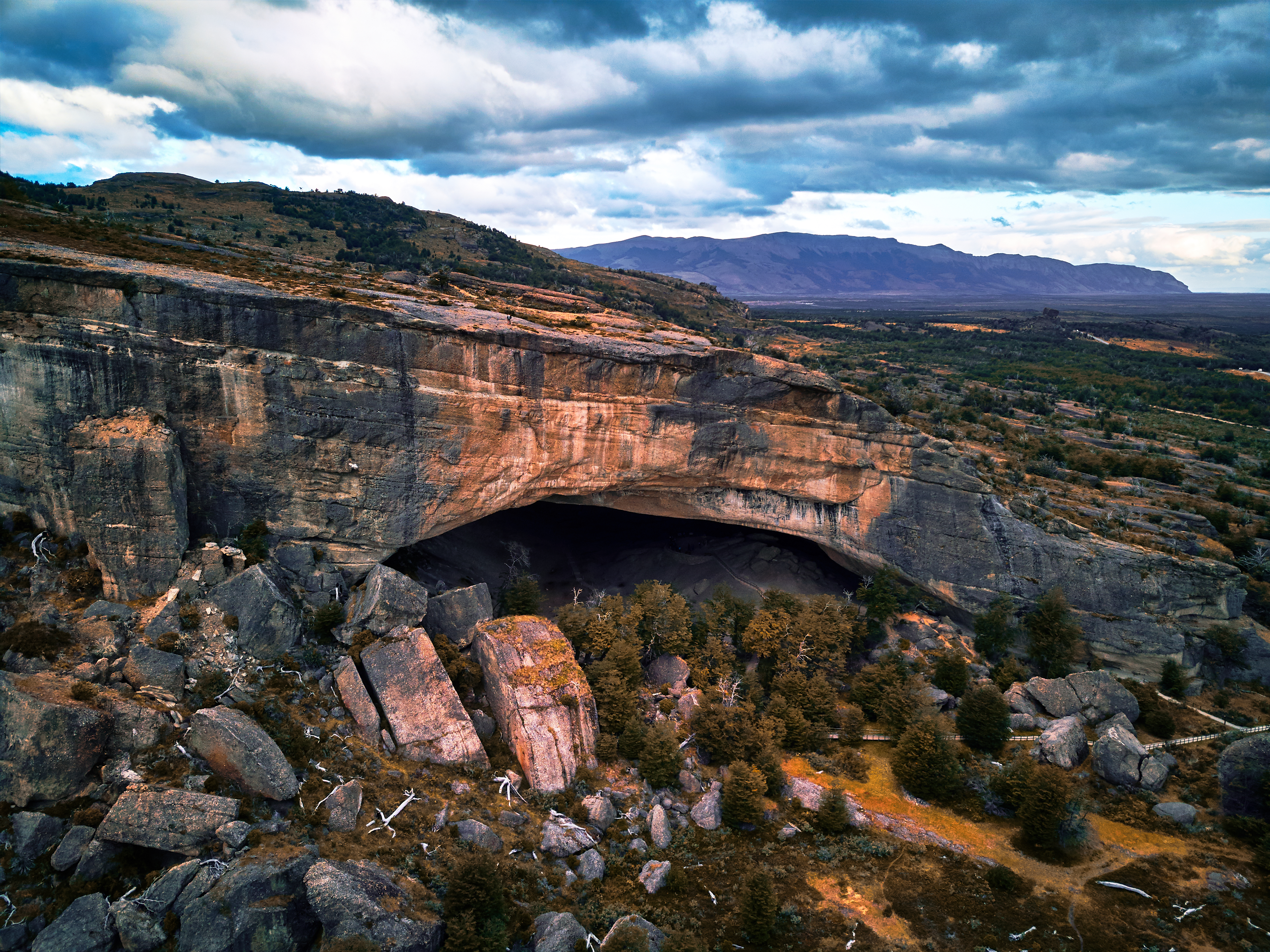
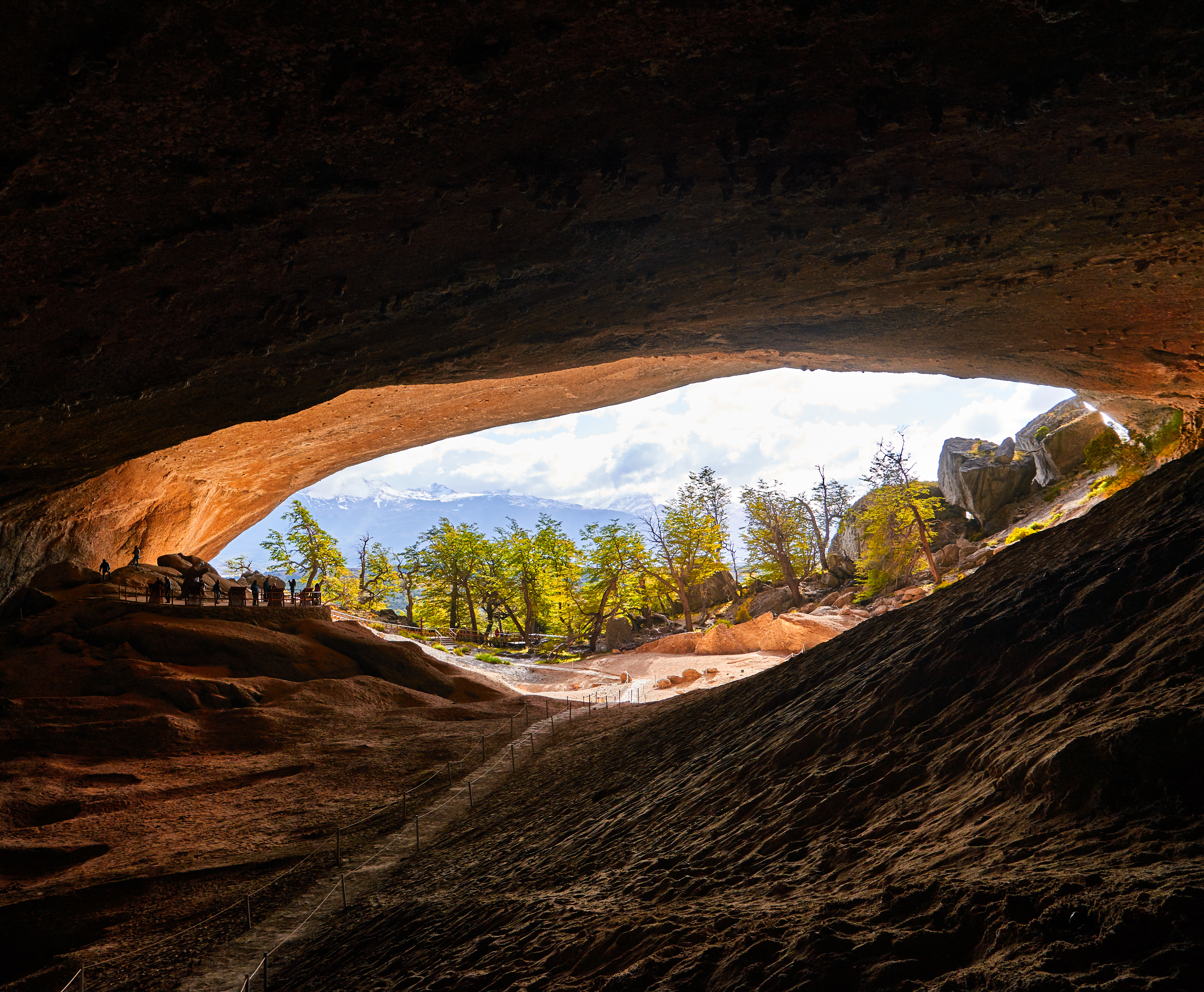
- Mylodon's Cave
- Interactive map of Cueva del Milodón Natural Monument
- Location: Magallanes Region, Chile
- Governing body: Corporación Nacional Forestal

Location of Cueva del Milodón in Chile

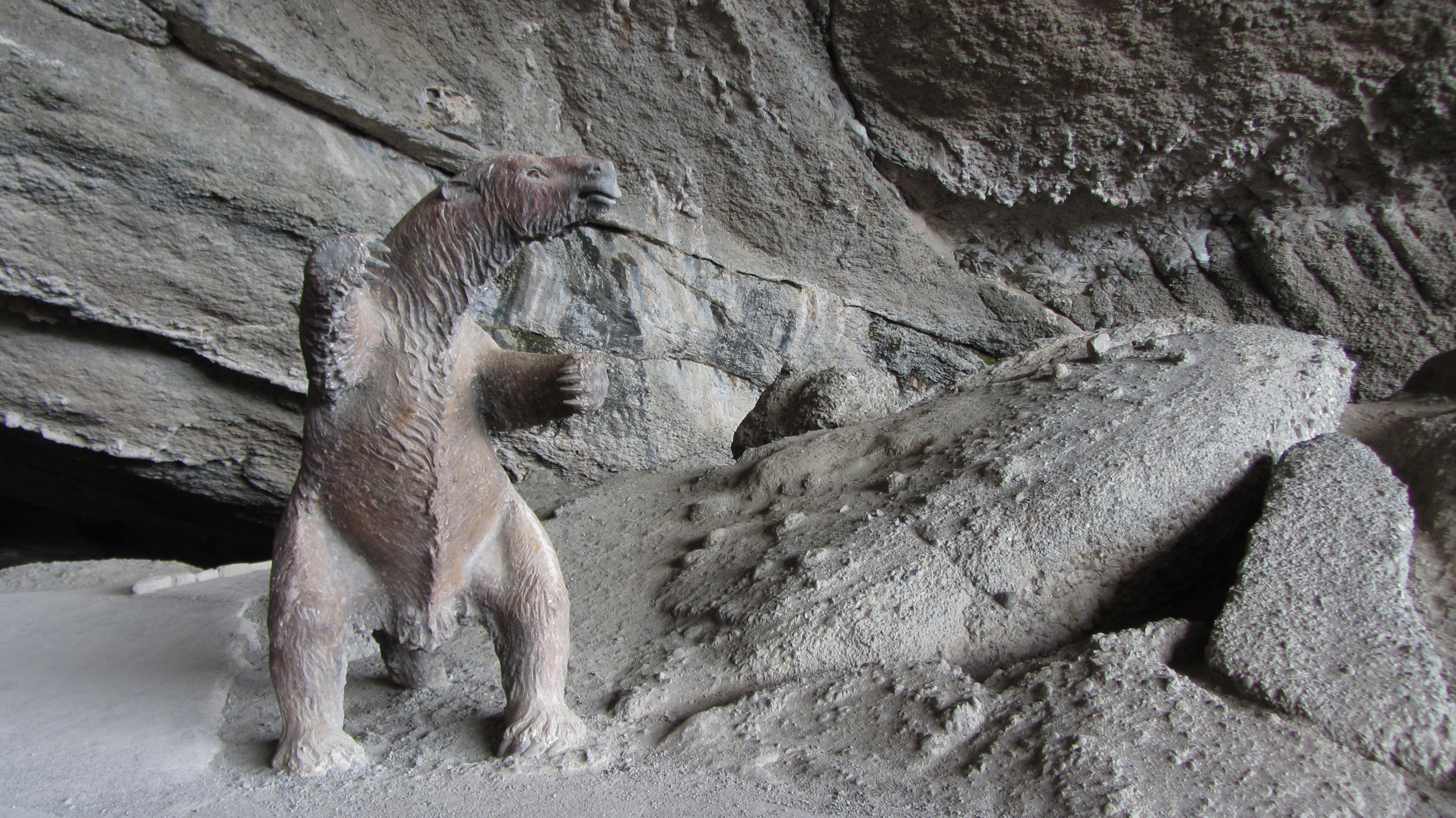
Replica of a Mylodon inside the cave

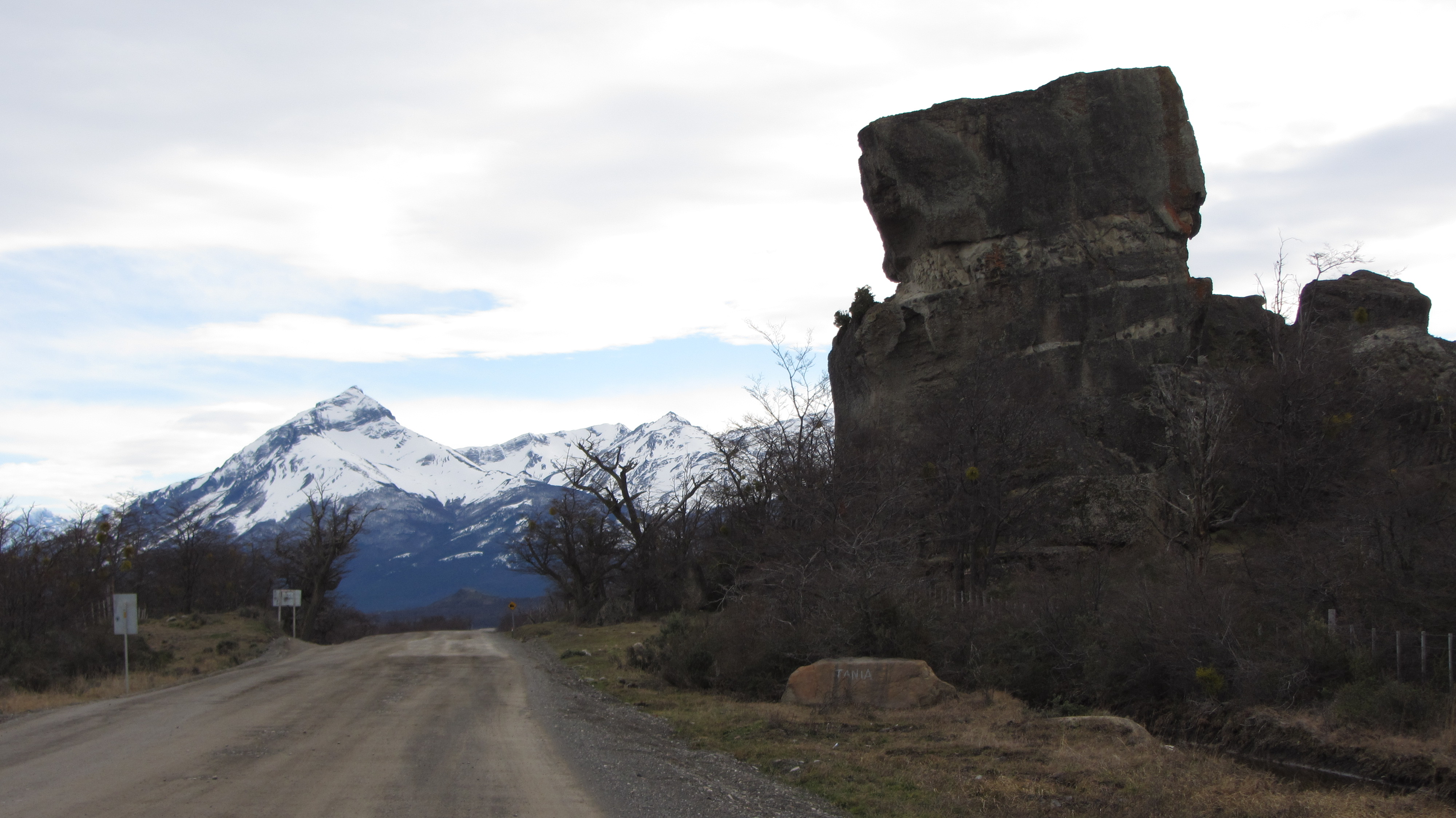
The "Devil's Chair" at the entrance of the monumental cave

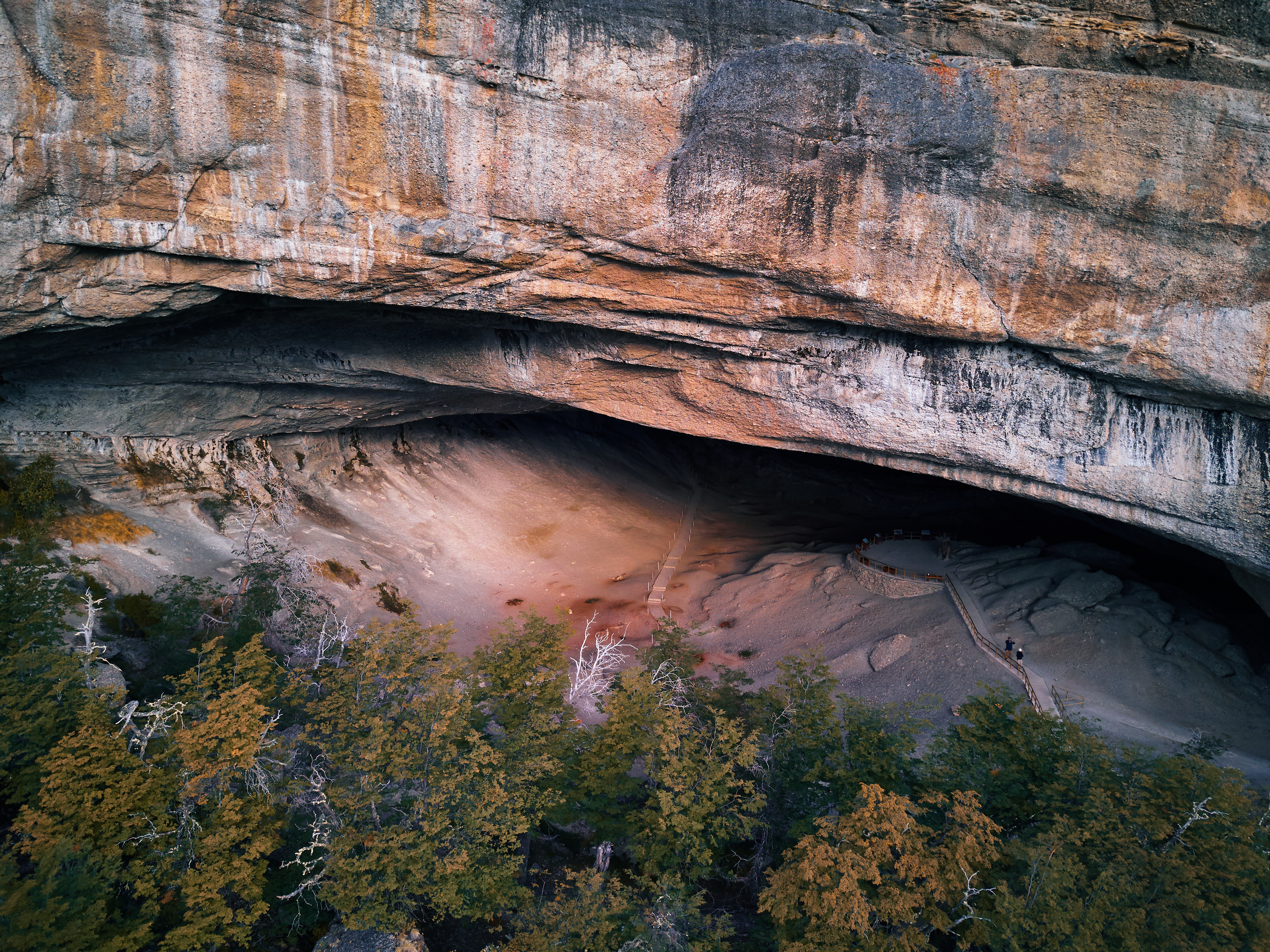
Interior of the largest cave

Cueva del Milodón Natural Monument is a Natural Monument located in the Chilean Patagonia, 24 km (15 mi) northwest of Puerto Natales and 270 km (168 mi) north of Punta Arenas.

The monument is situated along the flanks of Cerro Benitez. It comprises several caves and a rock formation called Silla del Diablo (Devil's Chair). The monument includes a cave which is notable for the discovery in 1895 of skin, bones and other parts of a ground sloth called Mylodon darwini, from which the cave takes its name. It is also part of the End of the World Route, a scenic touristic route.

== Milodón Cave ==
The largest cave in the monument is the 200 metres (660 ft) long Milodón Cave. It was discovered in 1895 by Hermann Eberhard, German explorer of Patagonia. He found a large, seemingly fresh piece of skin of an unidentified animal. In 1896 the cave was explored by Otto Nordenskjöld and later it was recognized that the skin belonged to Mylodon – an extinct animal which died 10,200–13,560 years ago.

In the cave and other caves of the monument have been found remnants of other extinct animals and human remnants.

At the entrance of the monument is a life size replica of the prehistoric Mylodon, which was a very large herbivore, somewhat resembling a large bear. It became extinct at the end of the Pleistocene Epoch.

== Animal remains ==
The cave is named after the large ground sloth Mylodon which has been found at the site. Other animals found at the site include the equine Hippidion, the saber-toothed cat Smilodon and the large camel-like ungulate Macrauchenia.

== Human remains ==
Diverse elements of human habitation are found at Cueva del Milodón including fire-fractured rock, lithic tools and human remains. Human habitation at Cueva del Milodón is dated as early as 6000 BC.

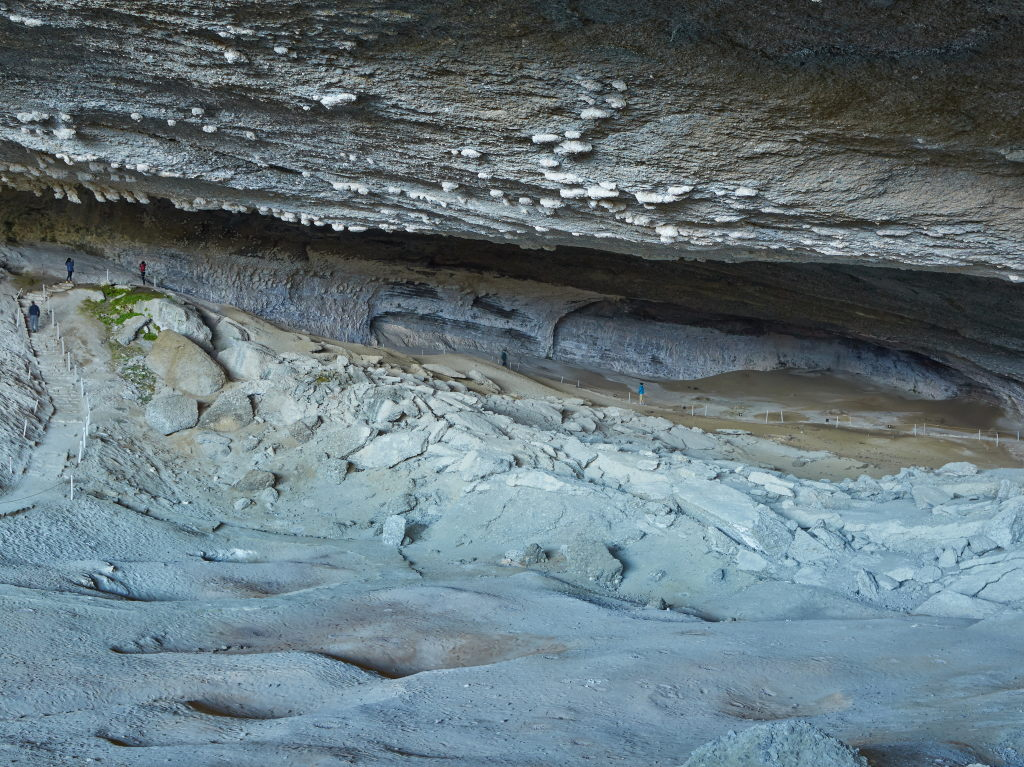

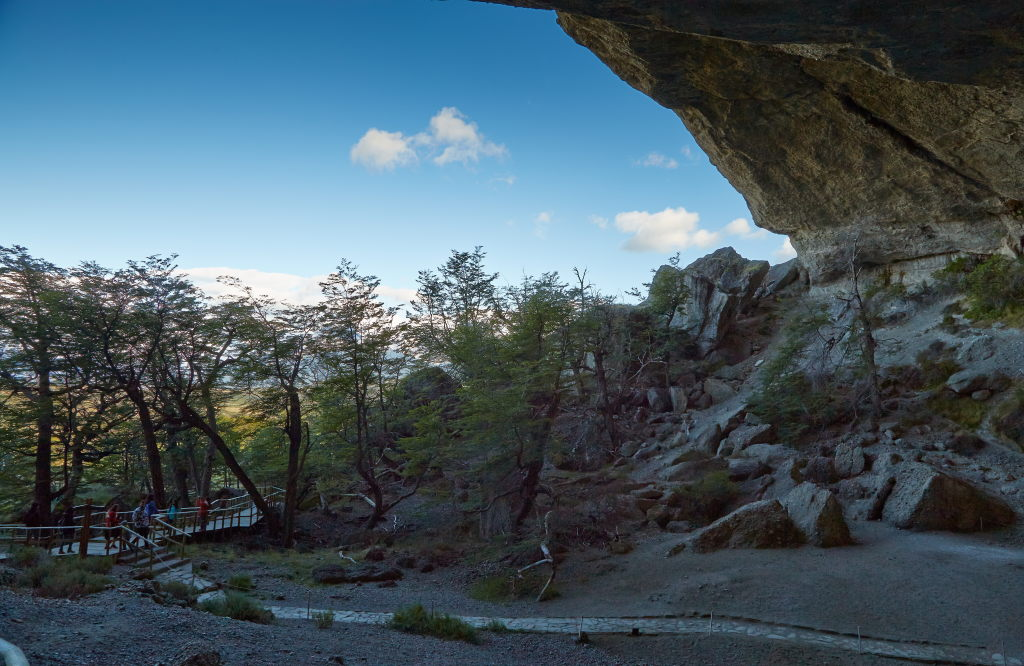

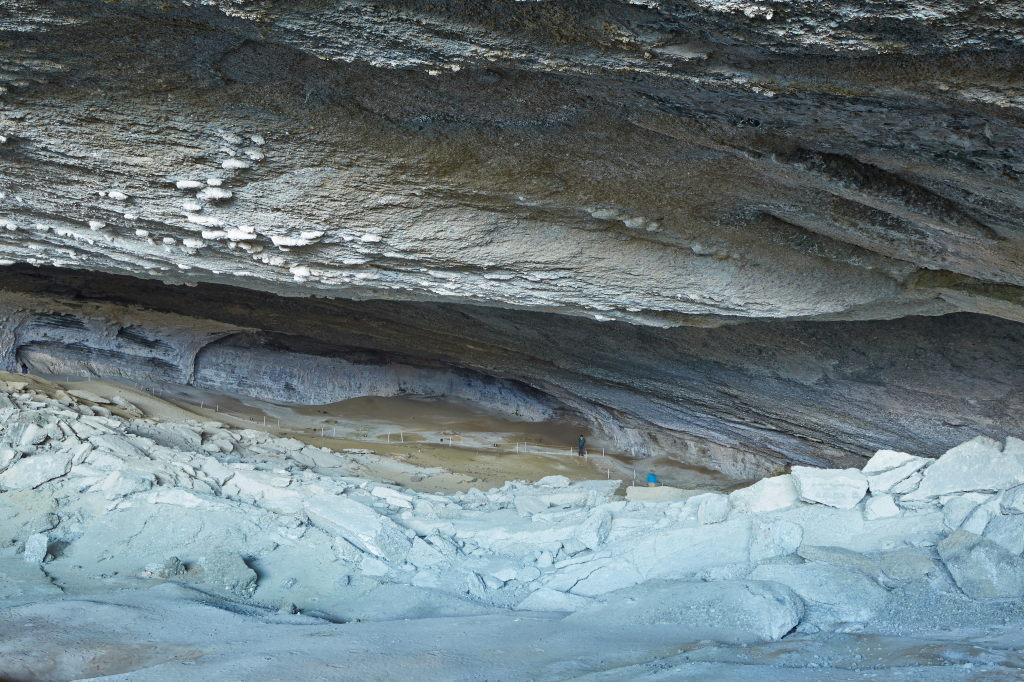

== Panorama ==
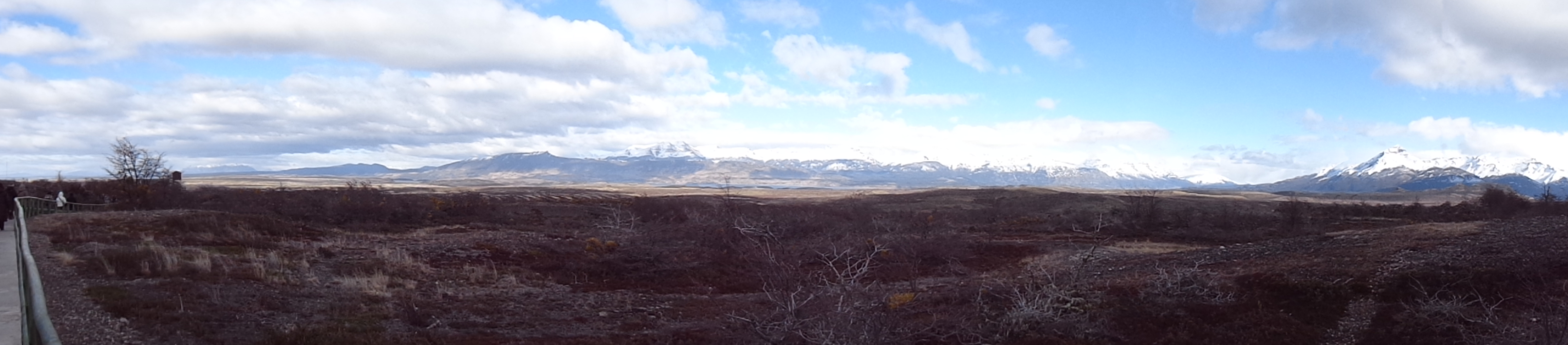
Panoramic view from outside the cave

== See also ==
- Cerro Toro
- Eberhard Fjord
- Martin Gusinde Anthropological Museum
- Hippidion saldiasi
