= Cuernos del Paine =

Mountain in Chile

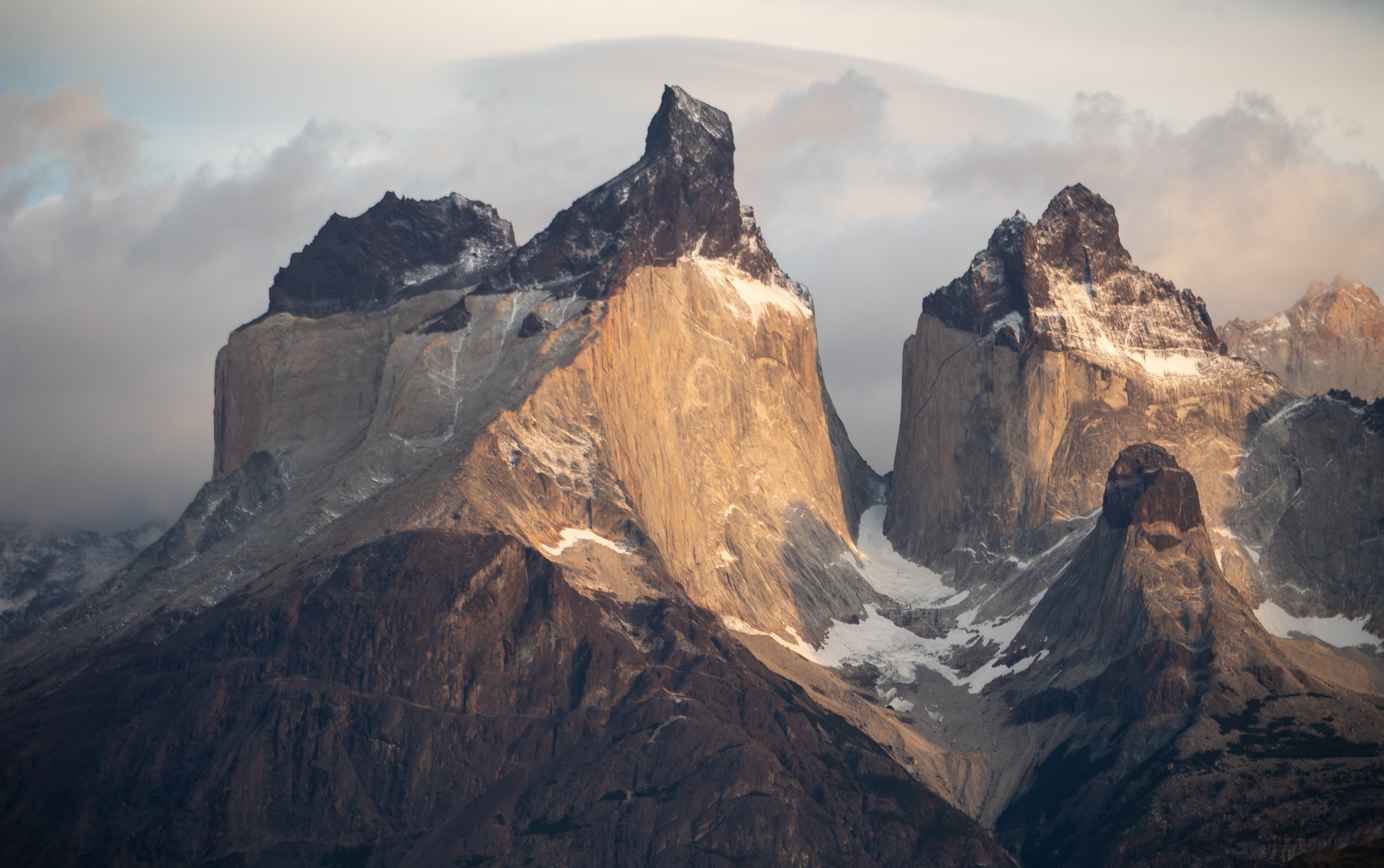
- South aspect

Highest point
- Elevation: 2,600 m (8,530 ft)
- Prominence: 550 m (1,804 ft)
- Isolation: 4.31 km (2.68 mi)
- Coordinates: 51°00′09″S 73°00′43″W

Geography
- Location within Chile Location within Southern Patagonia Location within South America
- Interactive map of Cuernos del Paine
- Country: Chile
- Province: Última Esperanza Province
- Protected area: Torres del Paine National Park
- Parent range: Andes; Cordillera Paine
- Topo map: IGM 1:50,000 Paine (Hoja Paine)

Geology
- Rock type(s): Granite, Metamorphic rock

Climbing
- First ascent: 1968

Cuernos del Paine is a mountain in the Magallanes Region of Chile.

== Description ==
Cuernos del Paine are 2,600-meter-elevation (8,530-foot) peaks in the Cordillera Paine group of the Andes. The peaks are located 95 kilometers (59 miles) north-northwest of Puerto Natales and the peaks are within Torres del Paine National Park. Precipitation runoff from the mountain's slopes drains into Nordenskjöld Lake which is part of the Paine River watershed. Topographic relief is significant as the summit rises 2,525 meters (8,284 feet) above the lake in 2.5 kilometers (1.55 miles). The mountain's toponym translates as "Horns of Paine" wherein "Paine" in the native Tehuelche language means "blue" which describes the color of the park's lakes. The nearest higher peak is Monte Almirante Nieto, 4.3 kilometers (2.7 miles) to the northeast.

== Climbing history ==
The first ascent of Cuerno Principal (Main Horn) was accomplished on January 31, 1968, via the southwest ridge by Raúl Aguilera, Eduardo García, Osvaldo Latorre, and Gaston Oyarzún, all four from the University of Santiago, Chile.

The first ascent of Cuerno Norte (North Horn) was accomplished on December 30, 1971, by Paul Fatti, Richard Hoare, Michael Scott, Paul Andersen, Roger Fuggle, and Tony Dick.

The first successful ascent of Cuerno Este (East Horn) was accomplished on January 19, 2022, by Pepo Jurado, Romano Marcotti, and Sebastian Pelletti via a class 5.11- route they named Vacaciones Metamórficas.

== Climate ==
Based on the Köppen climate classification, Cuernos del Paine is located in a tundra climate zone with long, cold winters, and short, cool summers. Weather systems are forced upward by the mountains (orographic lift), causing moisture to drop in the form of rain and snow. The months of December through February offer the most favorable weather for visiting or climbing in this area, however the region is characterized by low temperatures and strong winds throughout the year.

== Geology ==
The range is made up of granite underlain by grey gabbro-diorite laccolith and the sedimentary rocks it intrudes, deeply eroded by glaciers. The hot granite that intruded parallel to the sedimentary rock converted the mudstone and sandstone into a dark metamorphic rock. The steep, light colored faces are eroded from the tougher, vertically jointed granitic rocks, while the foothills and dark cap rocks are the sedimentary country rock, in this case flysch deposited in the Cretaceous and later folded.

The radiometric age for the quartz diorite is 12 ± 2 million years by the rubidium-strontium method and 13 ± 1 million years by the potassium-argon method. More precise ages of 12.59 ± 0.02 and 12.50 ± 0.02 million years for the earliest and latest identified phases of the intrusion, respectively, were achieved using Uranium–lead dating methods on single zircon crystals. Basal gabbro and diorite were dated by a similar technique to 12.472 ± 0.009 to 12.431 ± 0.006 million years. Thus, magma was intruded and crystallized over 162 ± 11 thousand years.

== Gallery ==
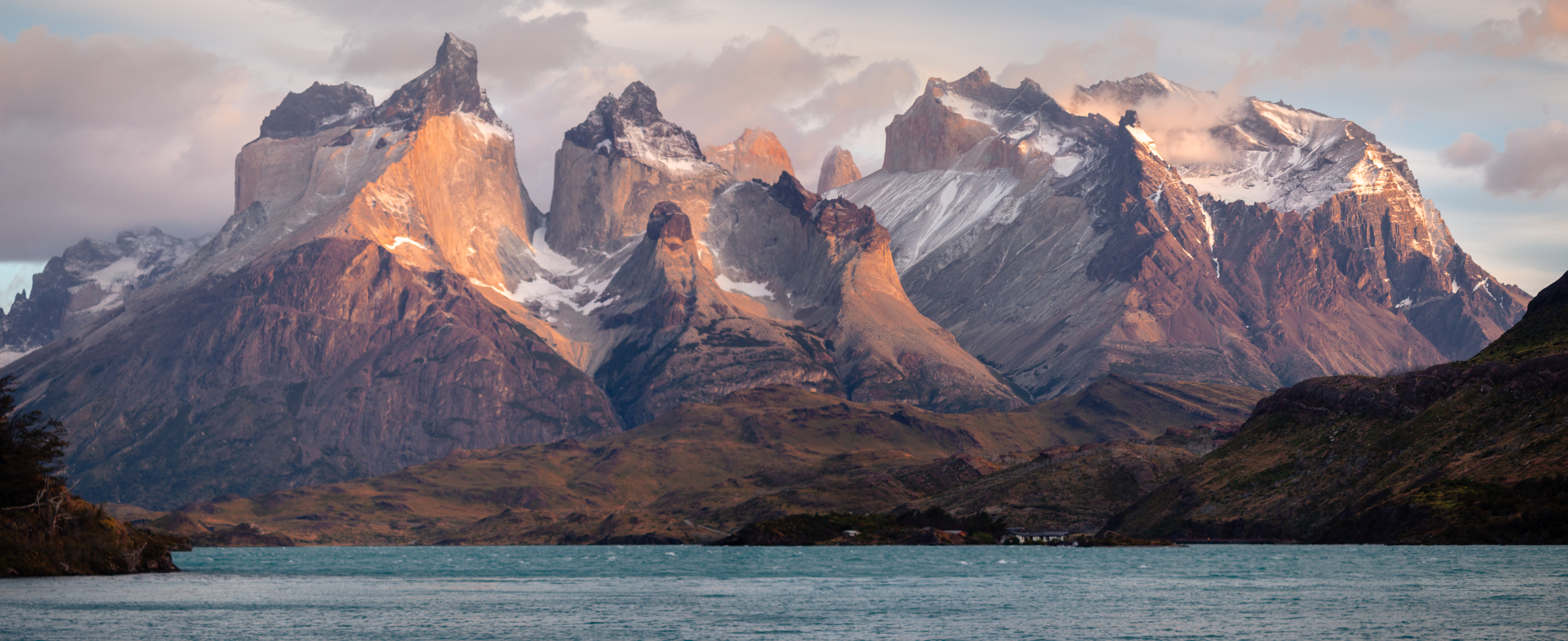
Cuernos del Paine (left) and Monte Almirante Nieto (right)

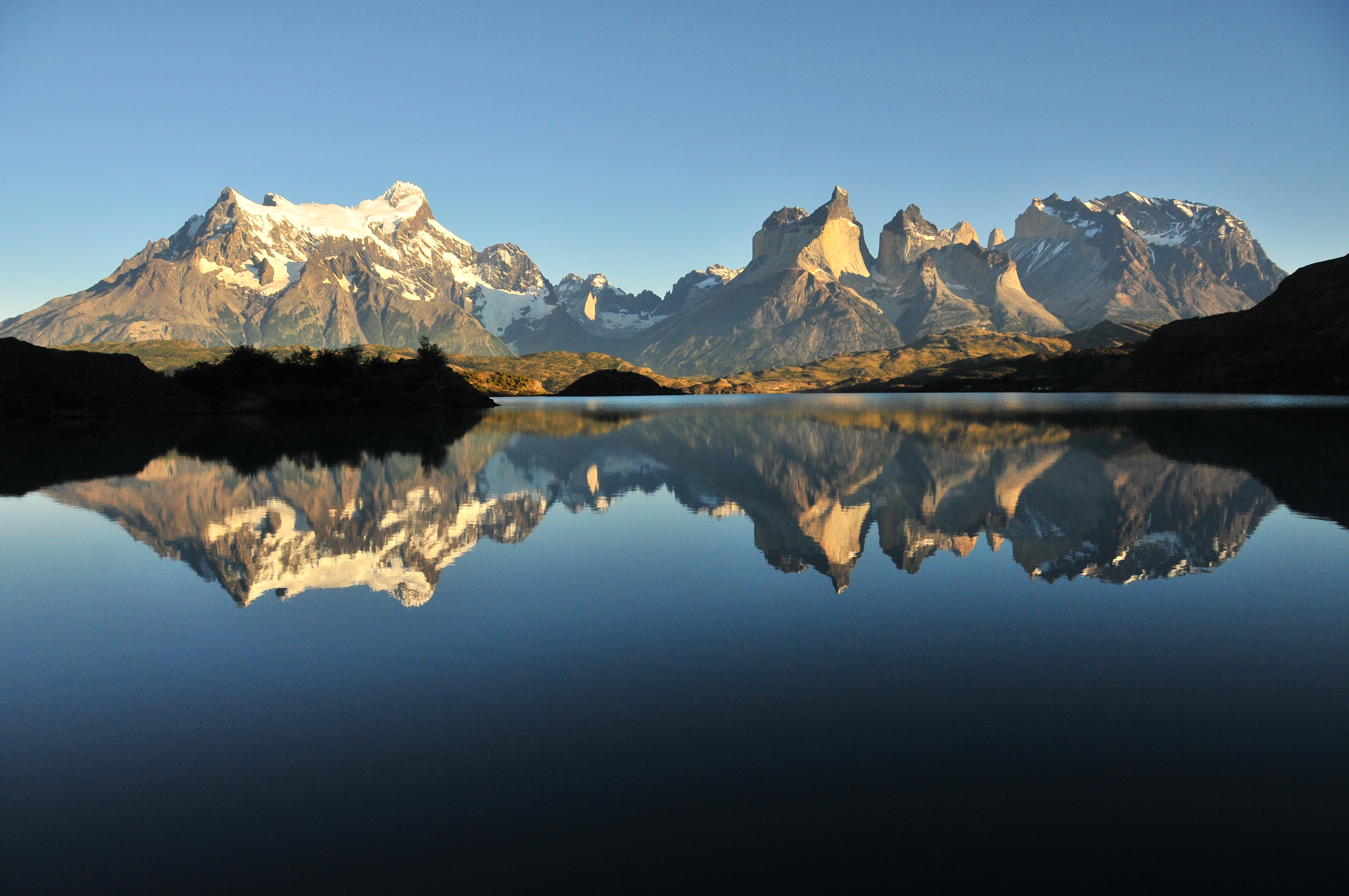
Cerro Paine Grande (left), Cuernos del Paine right of center, Monte Almirante Nieto (right)

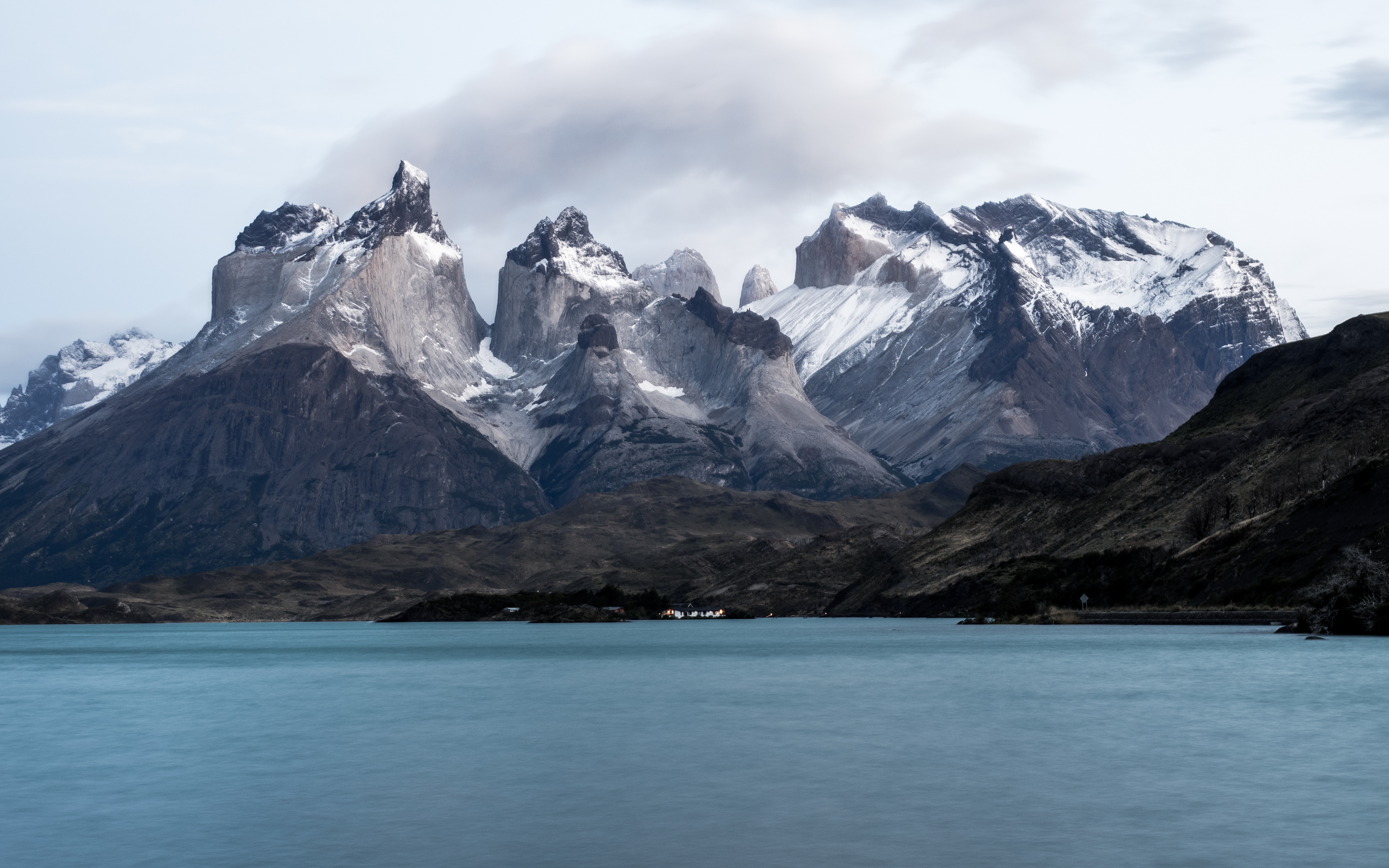
Cuernos del Paine (left) and Monte Almirante Nieto (right)

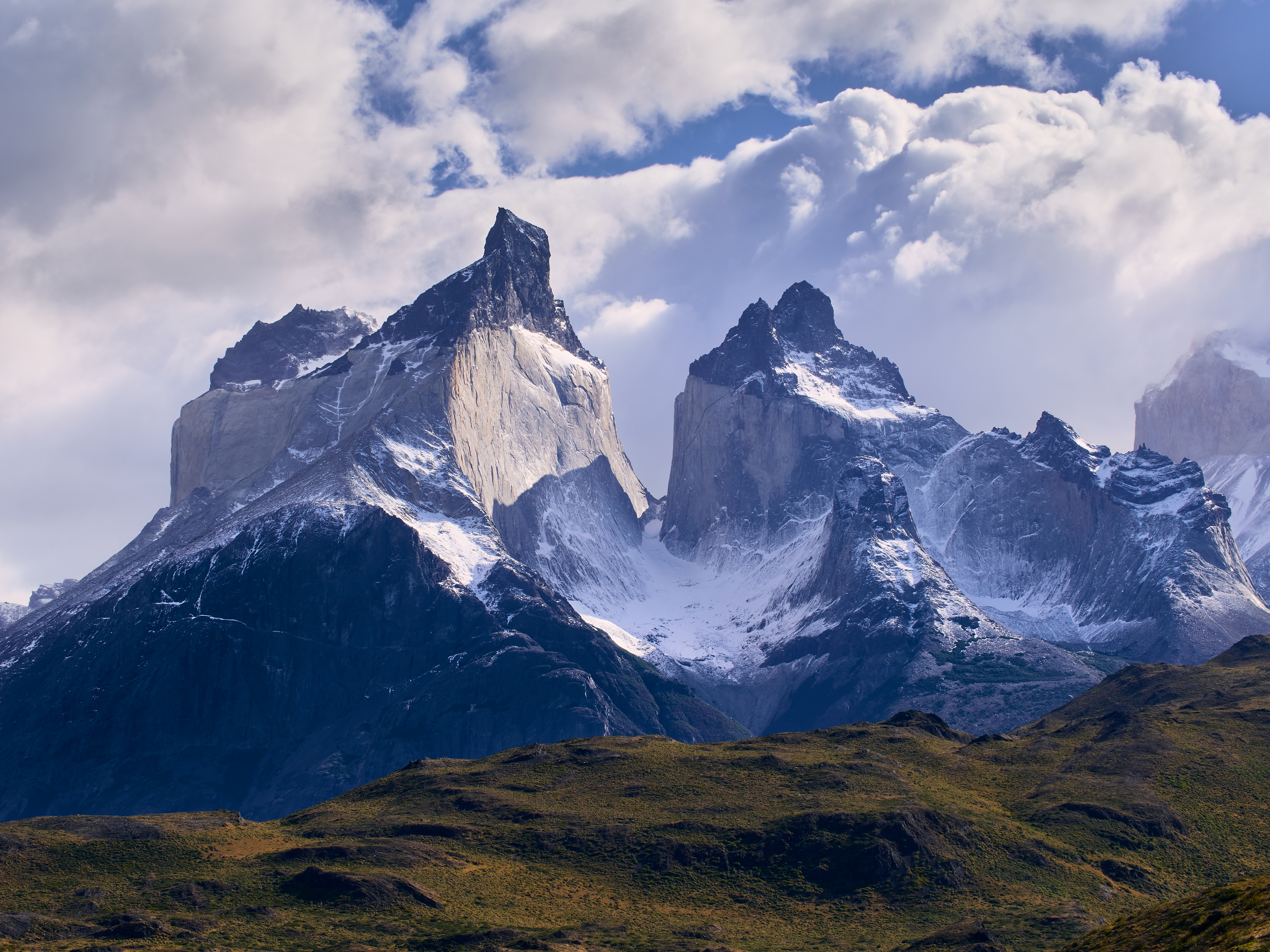

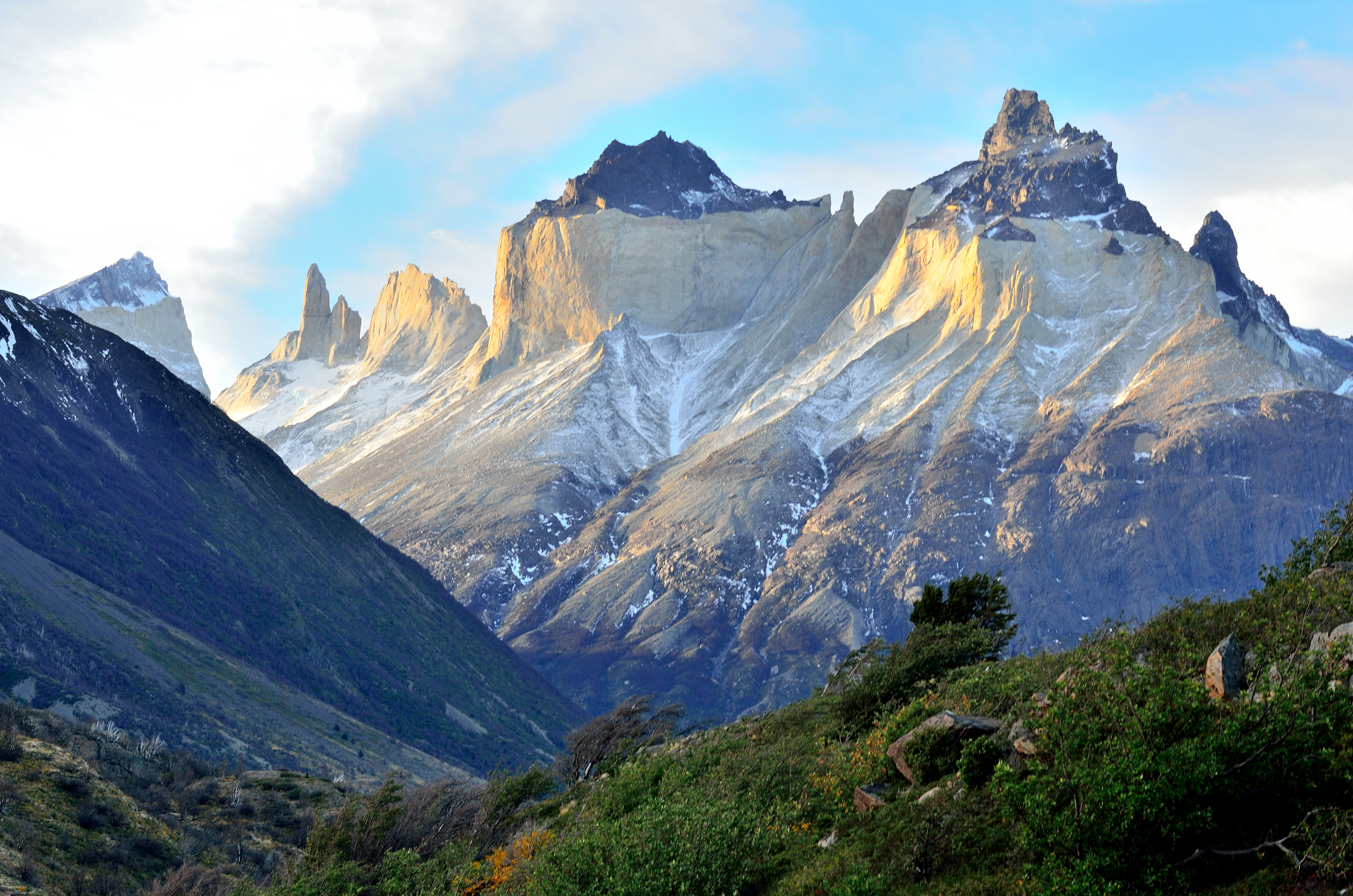
Cuerno Norte centered, Cuerno Principal to right

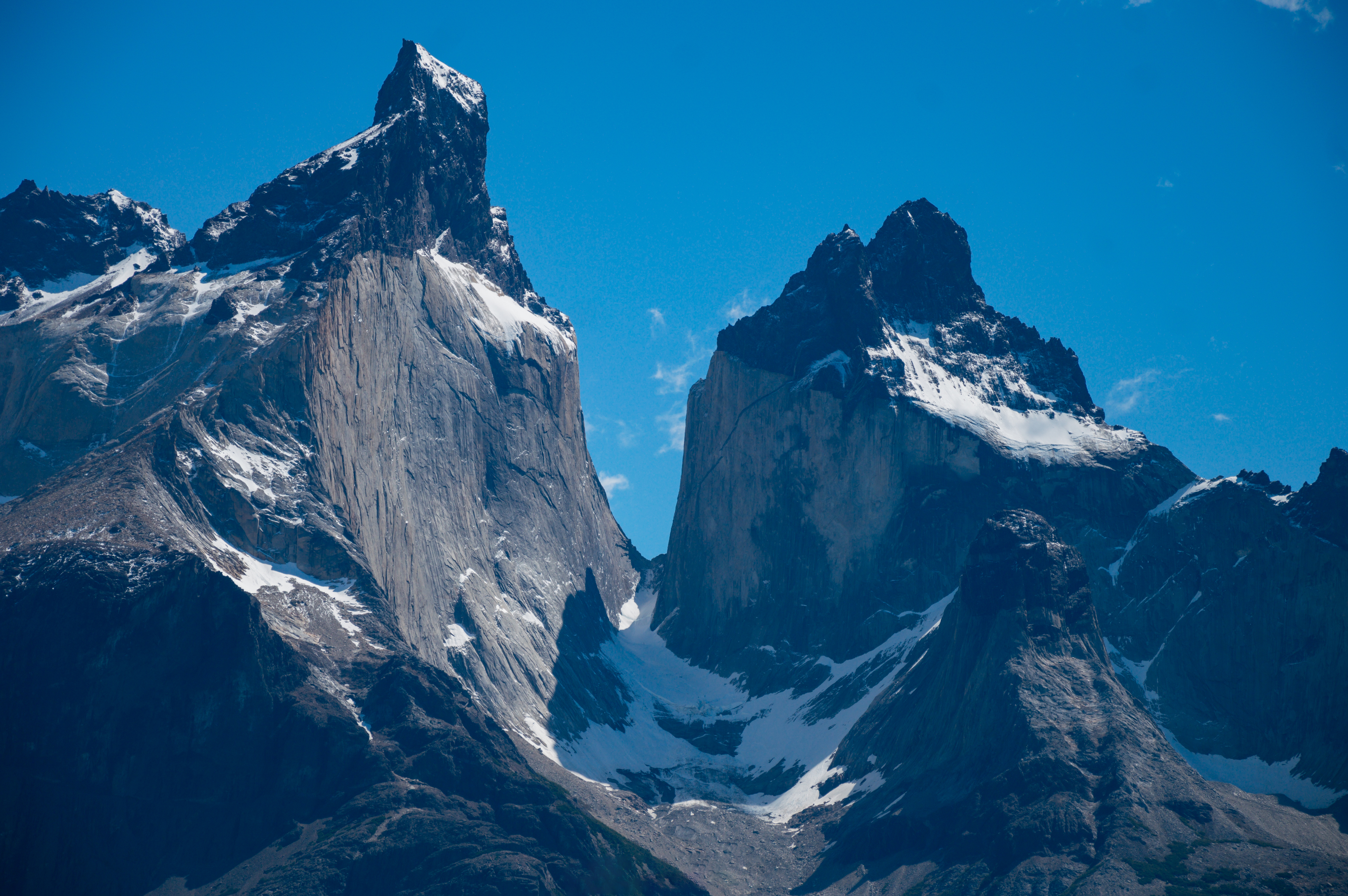
Cuerno Principal (left) and Cuerno East (right)

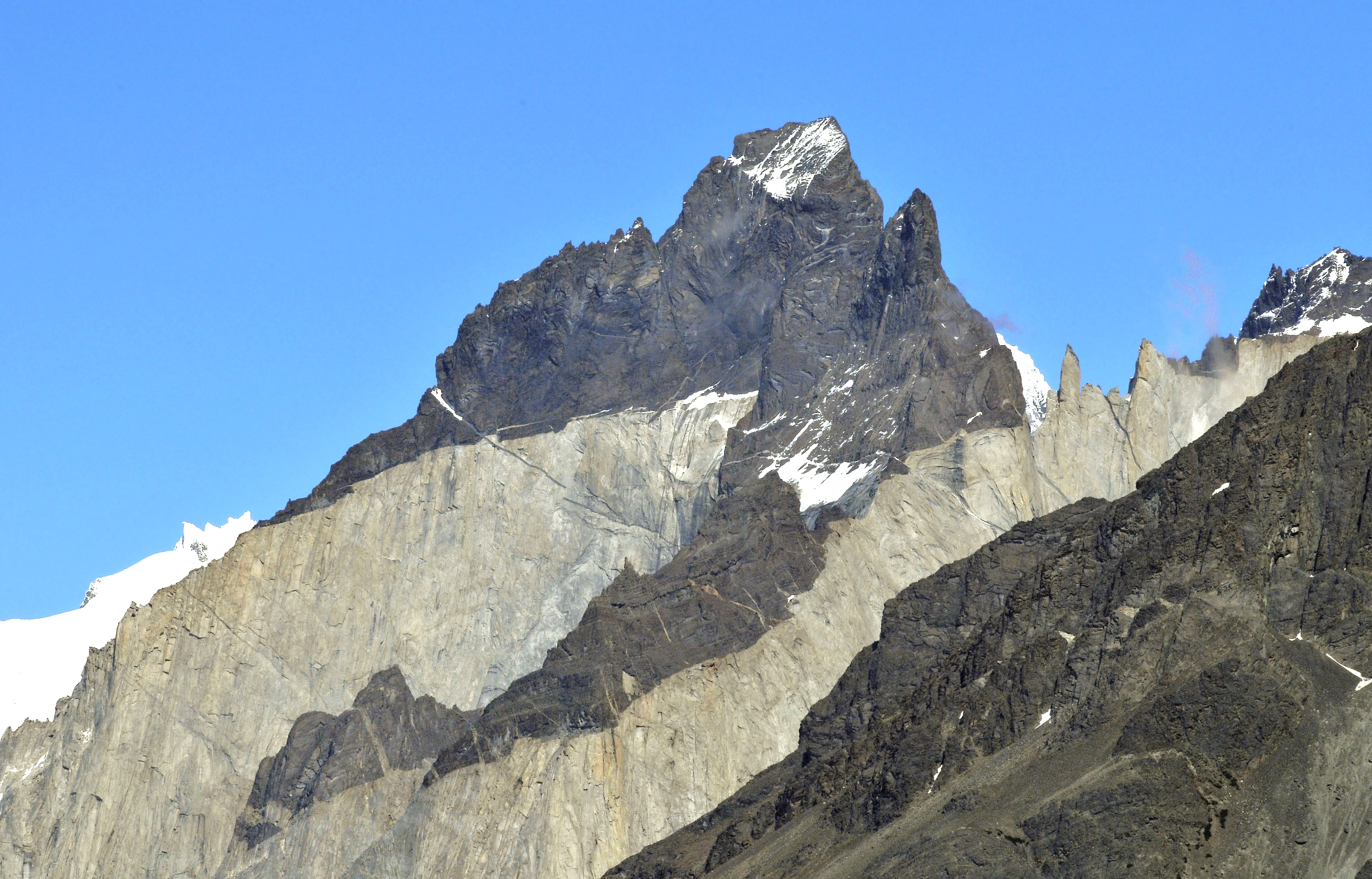
Light-colored granite and dark metamorphic rock of the Cuernos del Paine

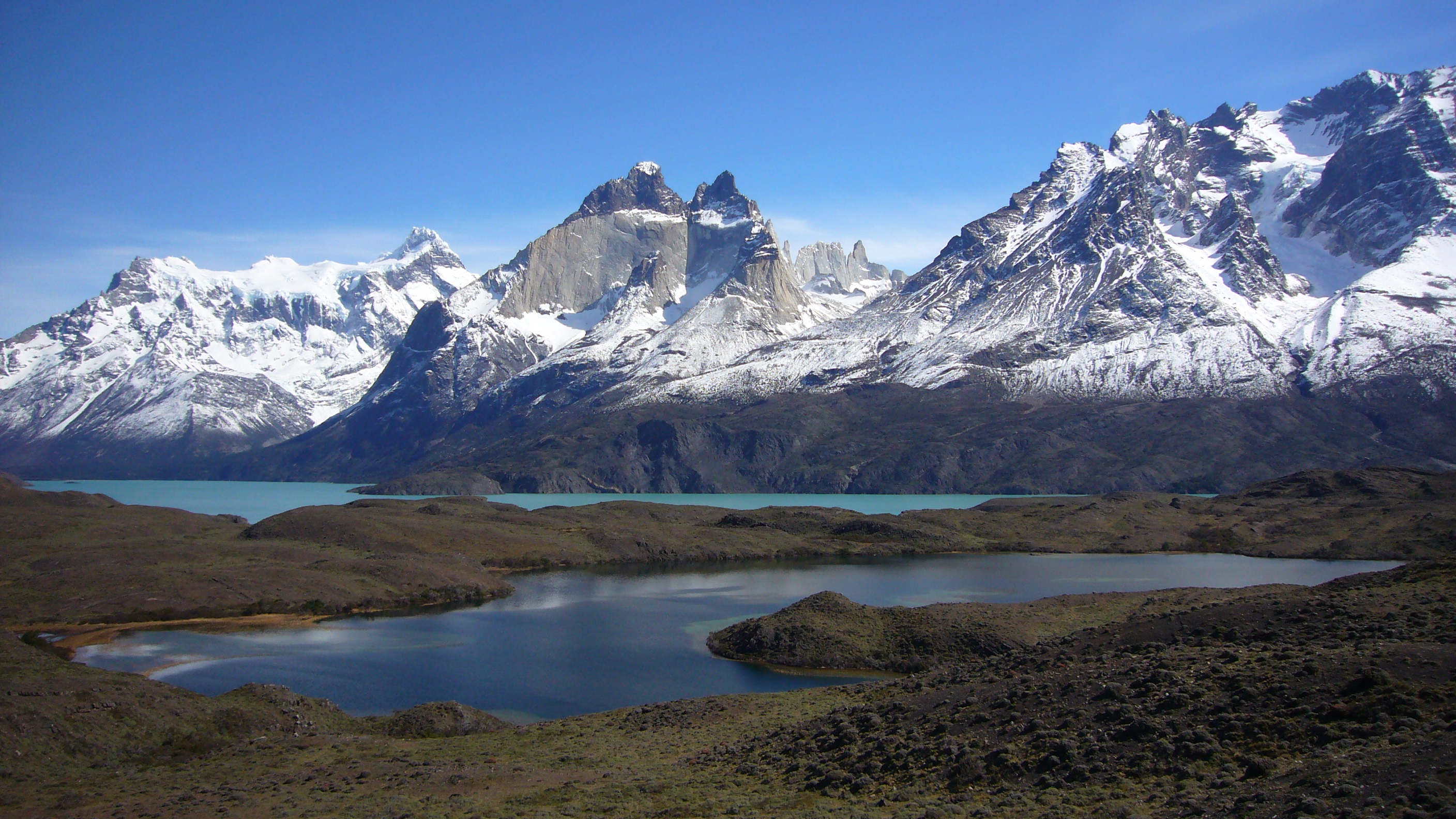
Cerro Paine Grande (left), Cuernos del Paine centered, Monte Almirante Nieto (right)

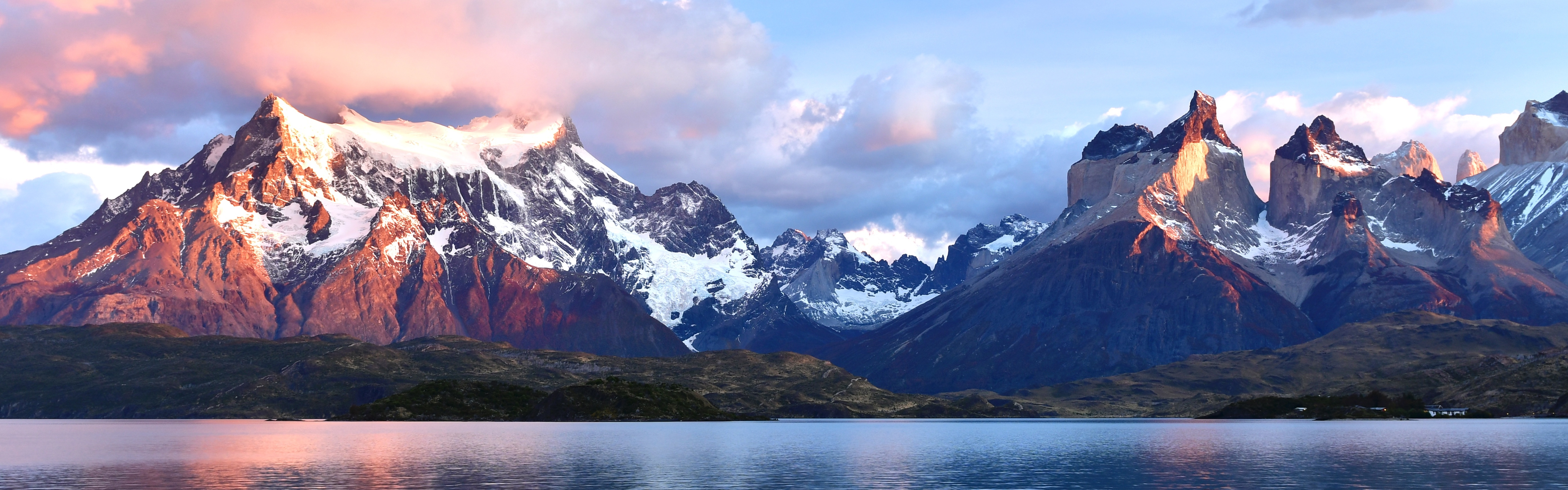
Cerro Paine Grande (left), Cuernos del Paine (right)

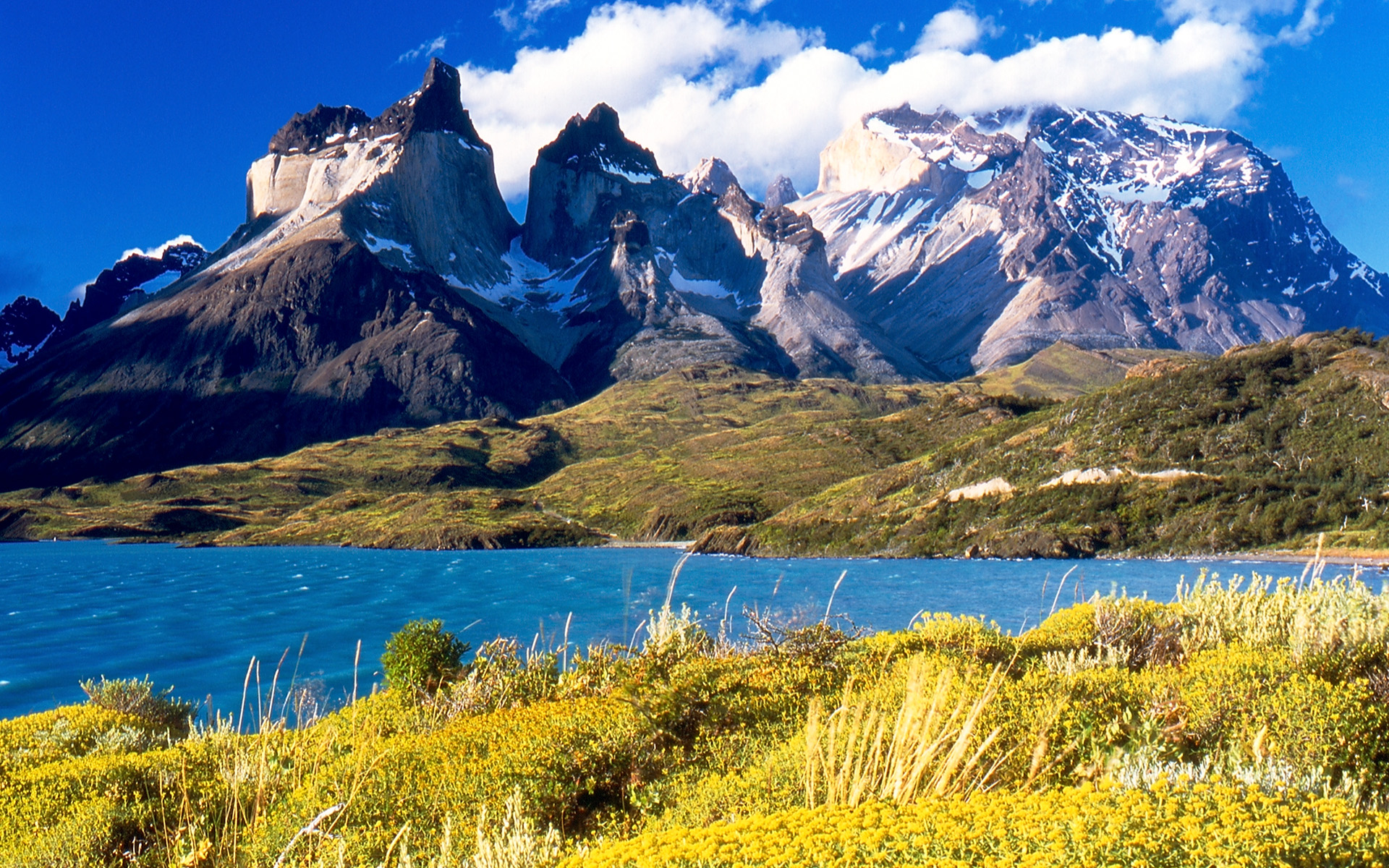
Cuernos del Paine from Lake Pehoé

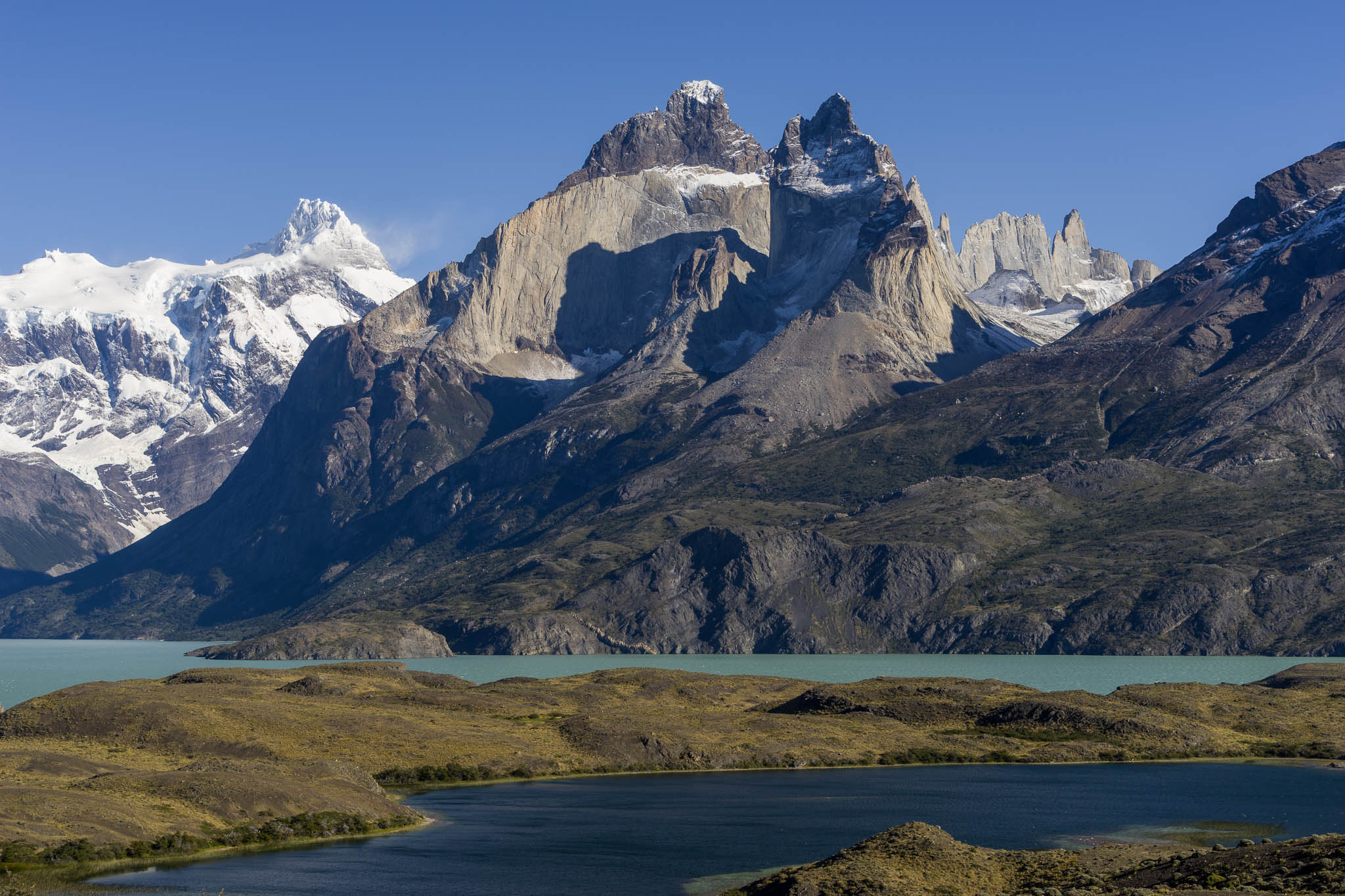
Cuernos del Paine centered. Cerro Paine Grande to left, La Espada in back to right.

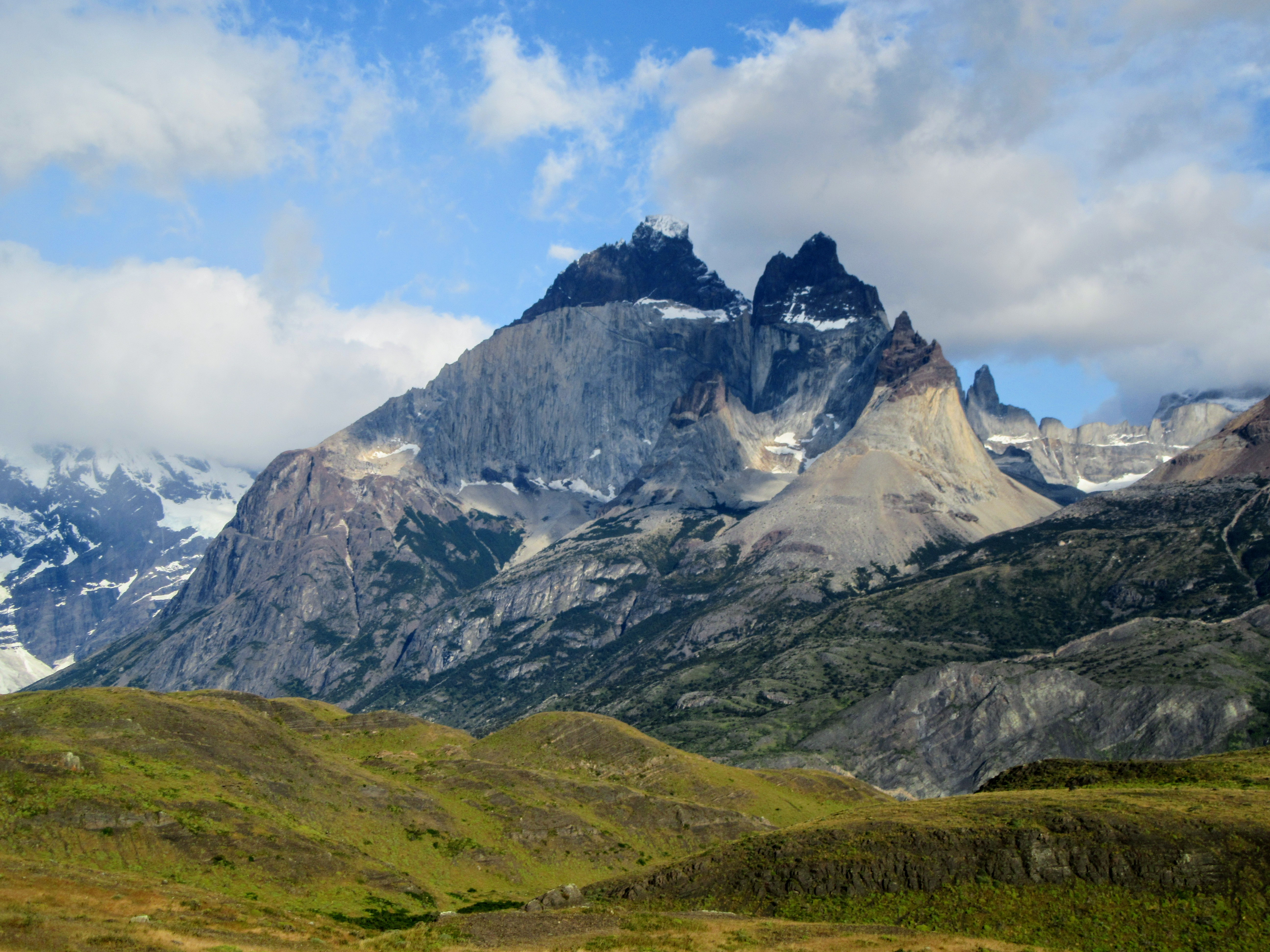

== See also ==
- Patagonia
