= Cerro Paine Grande =

Mountain in Magallanes Region, Chile

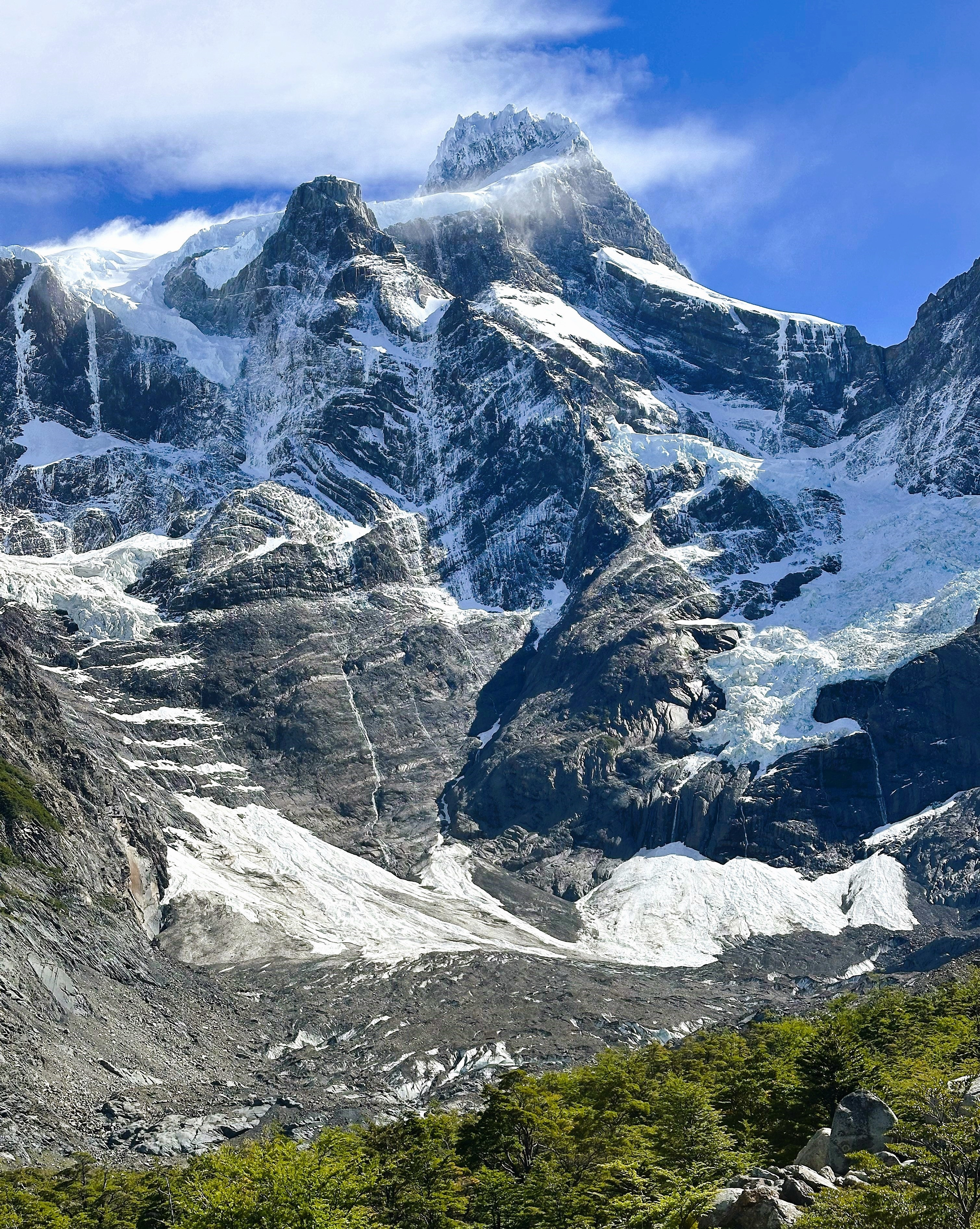
- Southeast aspect

Highest point
- Elevation: 2,884 m (9,462 ft)
- Prominence: 2,197 m (7,208 ft)
- Parent peak: Lautaro
- Isolation: 117.72 km (73.15 mi)
- Listing: Ultras of South America
- Coordinates: 50°59′42″S 73°05′12″W

Geography
- Location within Chile Location within Southern Patagonia
- Interactive map of Cerro Paine Grande
- Country: Chile
- Province: Última Esperanza Province
- Protected area: Torres del Paine National Park
- Parent range: Andes; Cordillera Paine
- Topo map: IGM 1:50,000 Paine (Hoja Paine)

Geology
- Rock type: Granite

Climbing
- First ascent: 1957

Cerro Paine Grande is a mountain in the Magallanes Region of Chile.

== Description ==
Cerro Paine Grande is a 2,884-meter-elevation (9,462-foot) summit in the Cordillera Paine group of the Andes. The peak is located 95 kilometers (59 miles) north-northwest of Puerto Natales, and the peak is the highest within Torres del Paine National Park and Cordillera Paine. Precipitation runoff from the mountain's west slope drains into Grey Lake, whereas the east slope drains to Nordenskjöld Lake, and both lakes are part of the Serrano River watershed. Topographic relief is significant as the summit rises 2,840 meters (9,317 feet) above Grey Lake in five kilometers (3.14 miles), and 2,380 meters (7,808 feet) above Francés Valley in three kilometers (1.86 miles). The mountain's Spanish toponym translates as "Great Blue Mountain." The nearest higher peak is Cerro Bertrand, 118 kilometers (73.3 miles) to the north-northwest.

== Climbing history ==
The first attempt to climb the mountain in 1954 ended when Herbert Schmoll and Toncek Pangerc perished in an avalanche. The first successful ascent of the summit was accomplished on December 27, 1957, by Italians: Jean Bich, Leonardo Carrel, Toni Gobbi, Camillo Pelissier, and Pierino Pession. The second ascent was made by Rolando Garibotti and Bruno Sourzac on October 28, 2000. The third ascent (first winter ascent) was made by María Paz Ibarra and Camilo Rada on August 14, 2011. The fourth ascent was made by Nicolás Gutierrez, Cristobal Señoret, and Diego Señoret in May 2016. The fifth ascent (first via southwest face) was made in June 2018 by Max Didier and Cristobal Señoret. The sixth and most recent successful ascent was made on April 11, 2024, by Victor Zavala and Sebastián Pérez.

== Climate ==
Based on the Köppen climate classification, Cerro Paine Grande is located in a tundra climate zone with long, cold winters, and short, cool summers. Weather systems are forced upward by the mountains (orographic lift), causing moisture to drop in the form of rain and snow. This climate supports the Frances Glacier on the south slope of the mountain. The months of December through February offer the most favorable weather for visiting or climbing in this area, however the region is characterized by low temperatures and strong winds throughout the year.

== Geology ==
The range is made up of a yellowish granite underlain by grey gabbro-diorite laccolith and the sedimentary rocks it intrudes, deeply eroded by glaciers. The steep, light colored faces are eroded from the tougher, vertically jointed granitic rocks, while the foothills and dark cap rocks are the sedimentary country rock, in this case flysch deposited in the Cretaceous and later folded.

The radiometric age for the quartz diorite at Cerro Paine is 12 ± 2 million years by the rubidium-strontium method and 13 ± 1 million years by the potassium-argon method. More precise ages of 12.59 ± 0.02 and 12.50 ± 0.02 million years for the earliest and latest identified phases of the intrusion, respectively, were achieved using Uranium–lead dating methods on single zircon crystals. Basal gabbro and diorite were dated by a similar technique to 12.472 ± 0.009 to 12.431 ± 0.006 million years. Thus, magma was intruded and crystallized over 162 ± 11 thousand years.

== Gallery ==
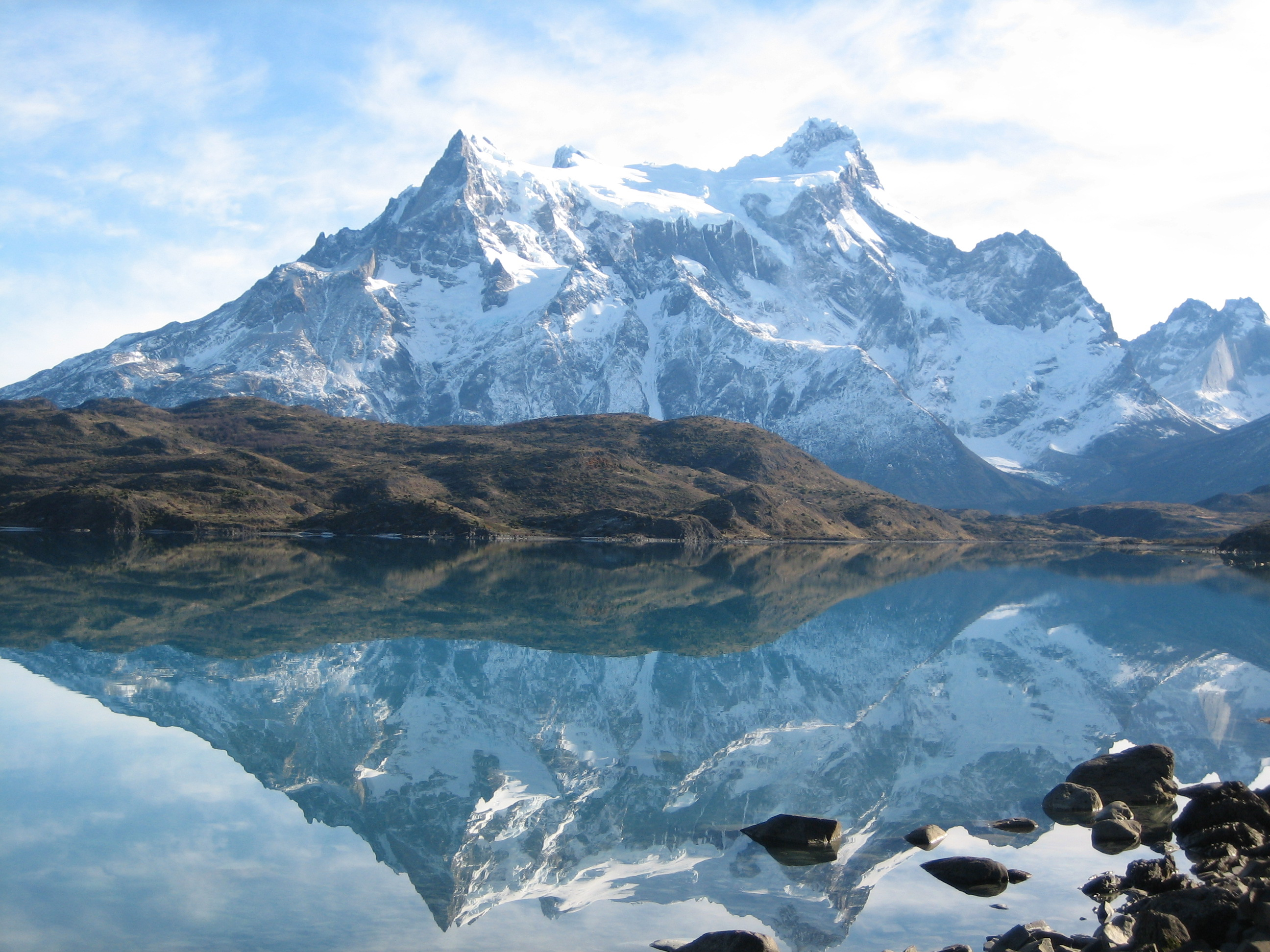
Cerro Paine Grande

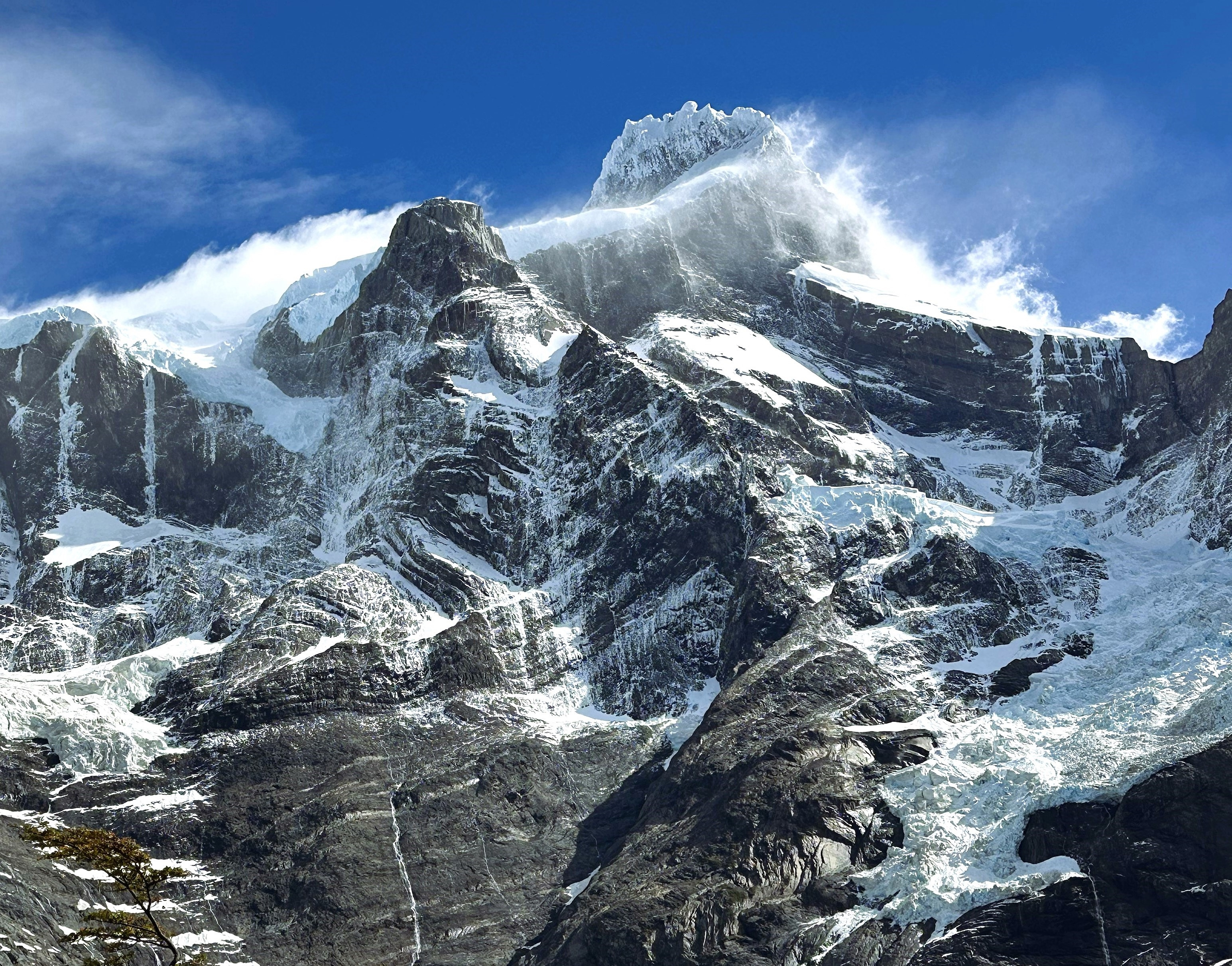
Southeast aspect from Frances Valley

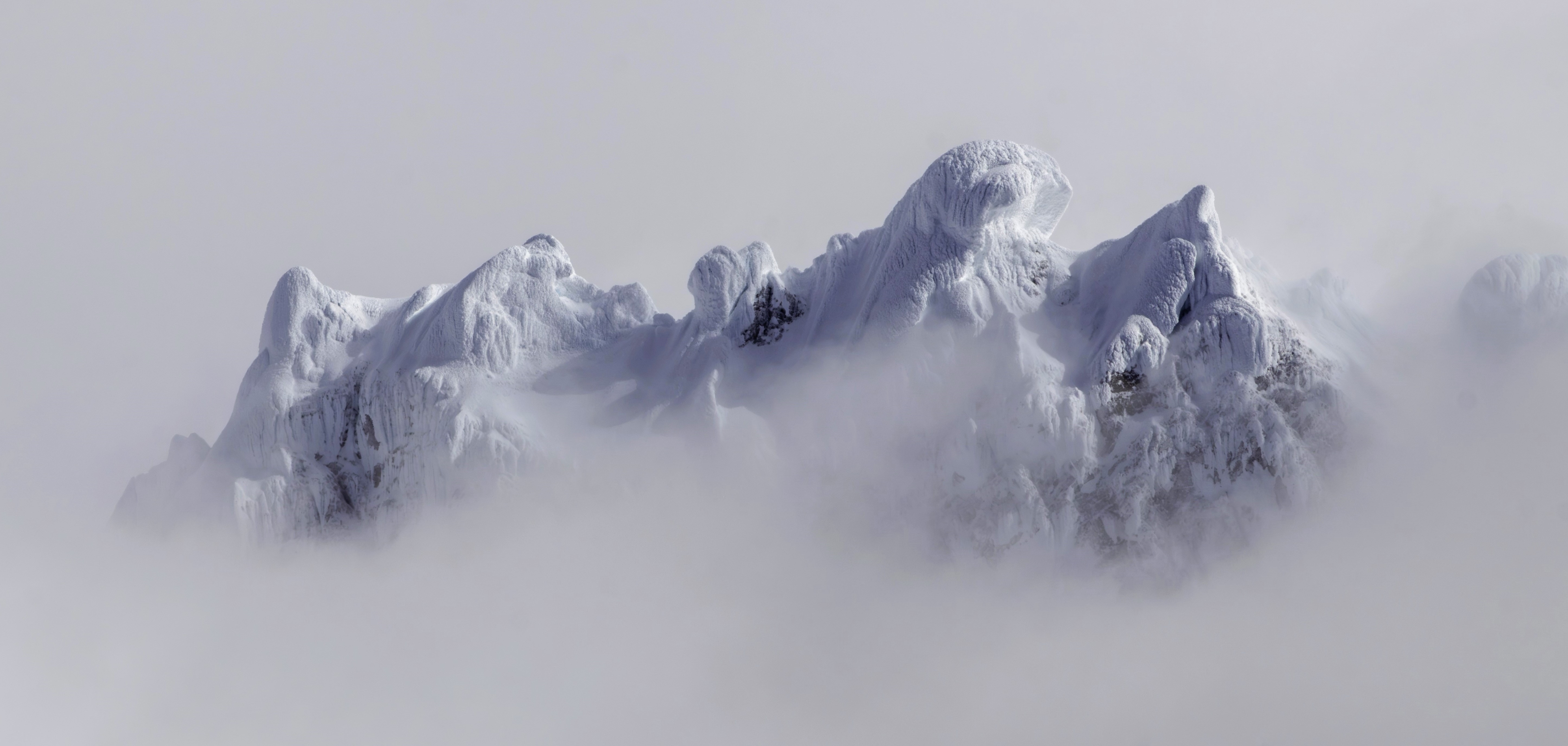
Summit of Cerro Paine Grande floating in the clouds

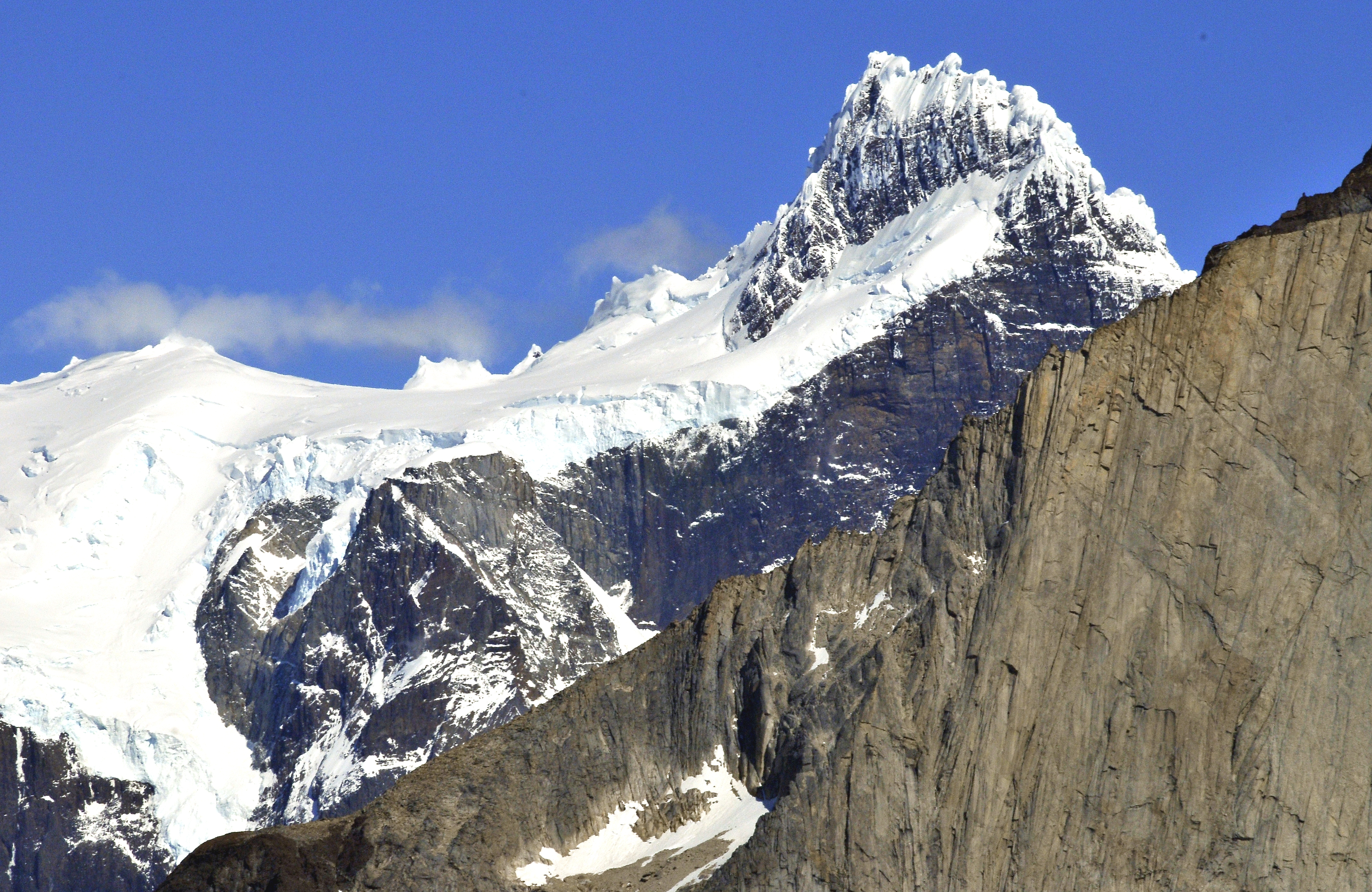
Frances Glacier and summit

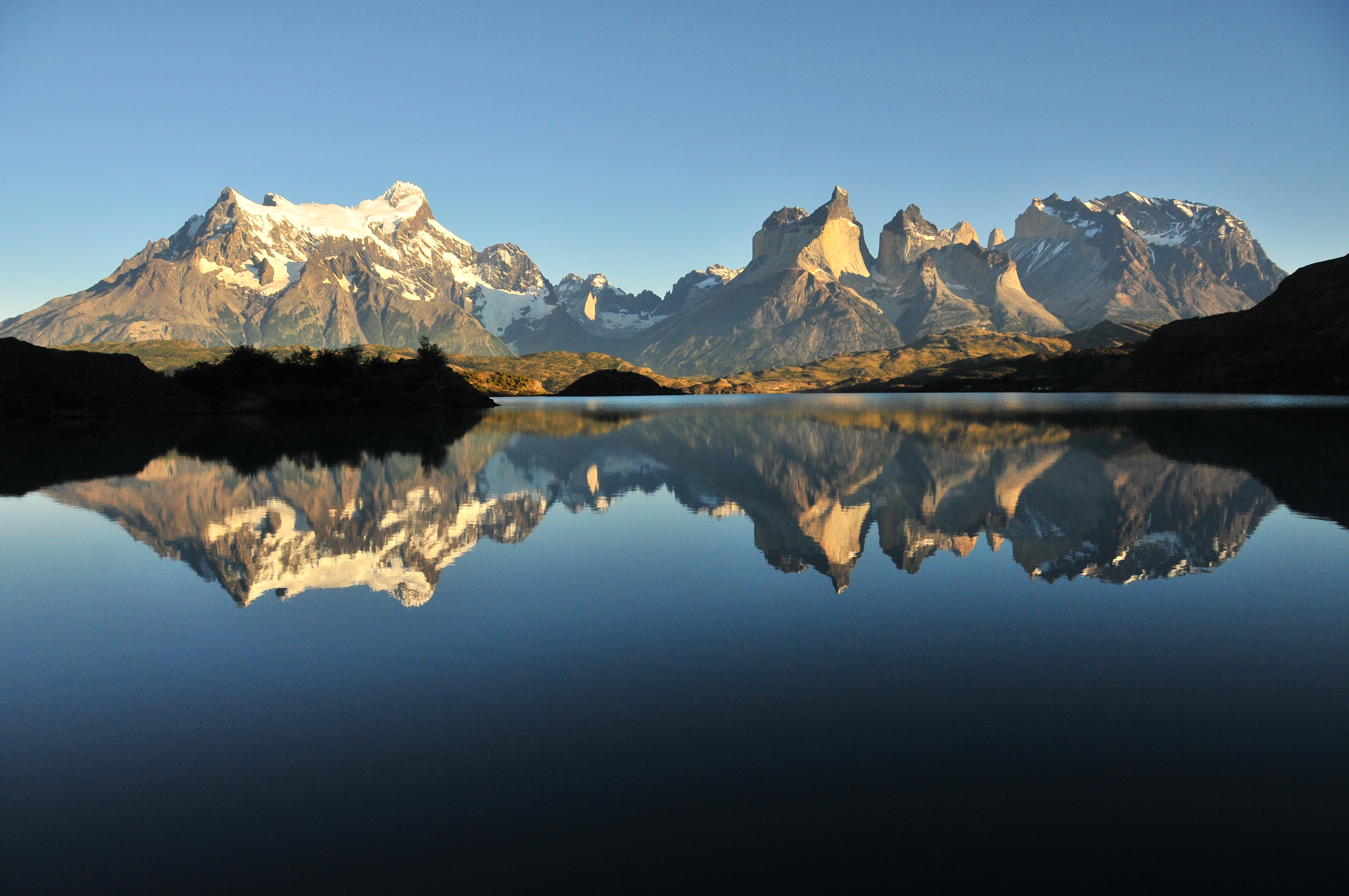
Cerro Paine Grande (left), Cuernos del Paine right of center, Monte Almirante Nieto (right)

South end of Cerro Paine Grande reflected in Grey Lake

== See also ==
- Patagonia
