= Guido Monzino =

Italian mountain climber (1928–1988)

- Born: 2 March 1928; Milan, Italy
- Died: 11 October 1988 (aged 60)
- Occupation(s): Explorer and mountaineer

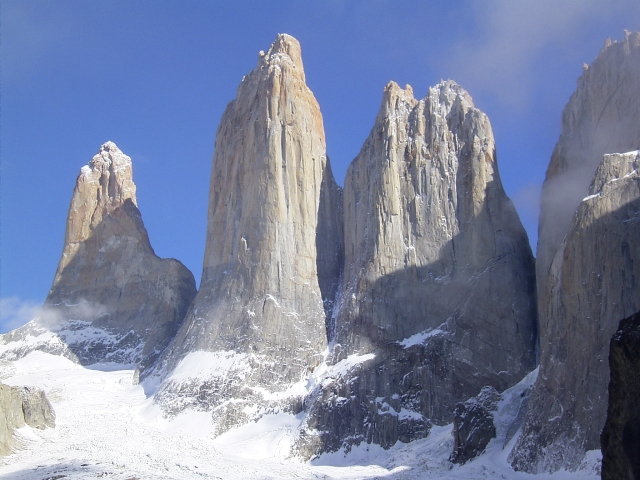
Torres del Paine: Monzino was the first to climb the North Tower

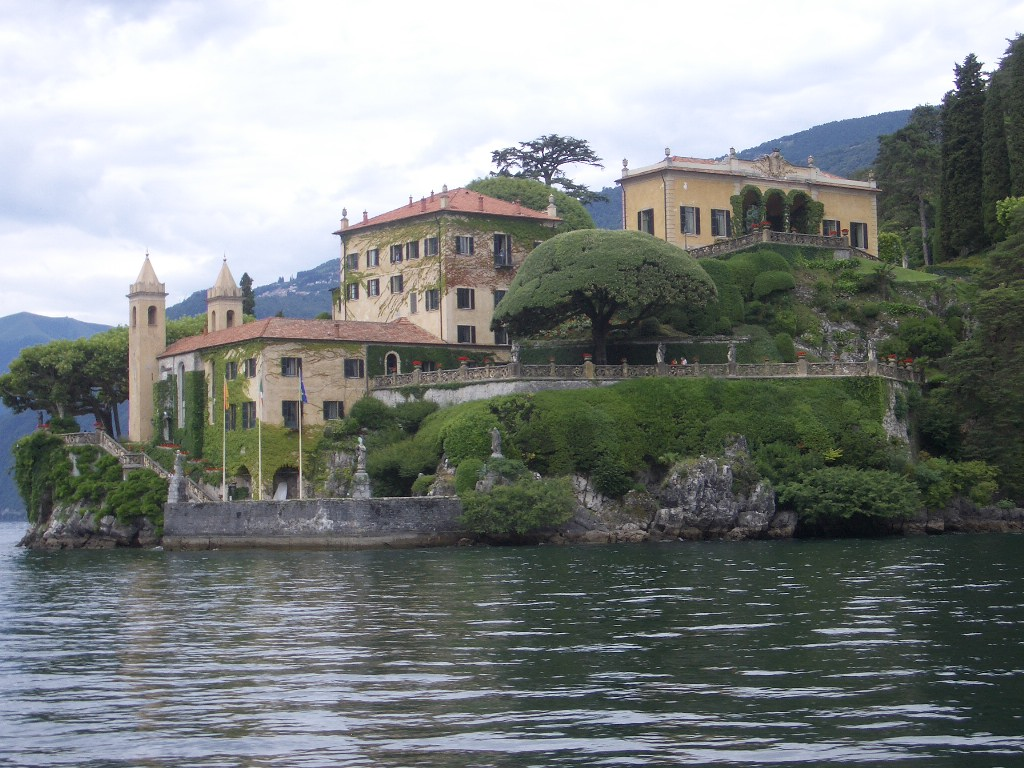
The Villa del Balbianello which was Monzino's home from 1974 until his death

Count Guido Monzino (2 March 1928 – 11 October 1988) was a twentieth-century Italian mountain climber and explorer. In 1973, he led the first Italian expedition to climb Mount Everest.

== Biography ==
Monzino was born on 2 March 1928 in Milan. His father was Franco Monzino (1891–1953), who founded the Italian supermarket chain Standa. His younger brother was the art collector Carlo Monzino (1931–1996). In his early twenties, he climbed the Matterhorn. Subsequently, he made a total of 21 expeditions to places including Patagonia, Equatorial Africa, Greenland, the North Pole and the Himalaya, and sometimes following in the footsteps of the famous explorer and mountaineer Luigi Amedeo, Duke of the Abruzzi (1873–1933).

Monzino died on 11 October 1988 due to lung cancer. He was interred at the Villa del Balbianello on the banks of Lake Como, which he bought in 1974 from the heirs of Butler Ames. Monzino willed Villa del Balbianello to the Fondo per l'Ambiente Italiano.

The villa today contains a museum devoted to Monzino, which includes artifacts acquired on his expeditions including Inuit sculpture, as well as memorabilia including one of the dog sleds from his 1971 expedition to the North Pole, and Monzino's extensive collections of maps and books.

== Expeditions ==
- 1955 West Africa – Senegal, Guinea and Côte d'Ivoire
- 1956 Western Alps in Italy and Switzerland – Grandes Murailles
- 1957–1958 Patagonian Andes – Torres del Paine, including the first ascent of the North Tower of Paine
- 1959 Karakoram mountain range, Pakistan – including the first ascent of Kanjut Sar I
- 1959–1960 Equatorial Africa – Kilimanjaro
- 1960 Western Greenland – 66th parallel north
- 1960–1961 Equatorial Africa – Mount Kenya
- 1961 Western Greenland – 74th parallel north
- 1961–1962 Equatorial Africa – Mountains of the Moon and Ruwenzori
- 1962 Western Greenland – 72nd parallel north by sled
- 1962 Western Greenland – 77th parallel north
- 1963 Eastern Greenland – Stauning Alps
- 1963–1964 Saharan Africa – Tibesti
- 1968 Western Greenland – a nautical expedition
- 1969 Western Greenland – Ilulissat to Qaanaaq by sled
- 1969 71st Italian expedition to the North Pole
- 1970 Qaanaaq to Cape Columbia
- 1970 Western Greenland, a nautical expedition
- 1971 Cape Columbia to the North Pole by sled
- 1973 Himalaya, Nepal – leader of the first Italian expedition to ascend Everest
