= Monte Almirante Nieto =

- Cerro Almirante Nieto
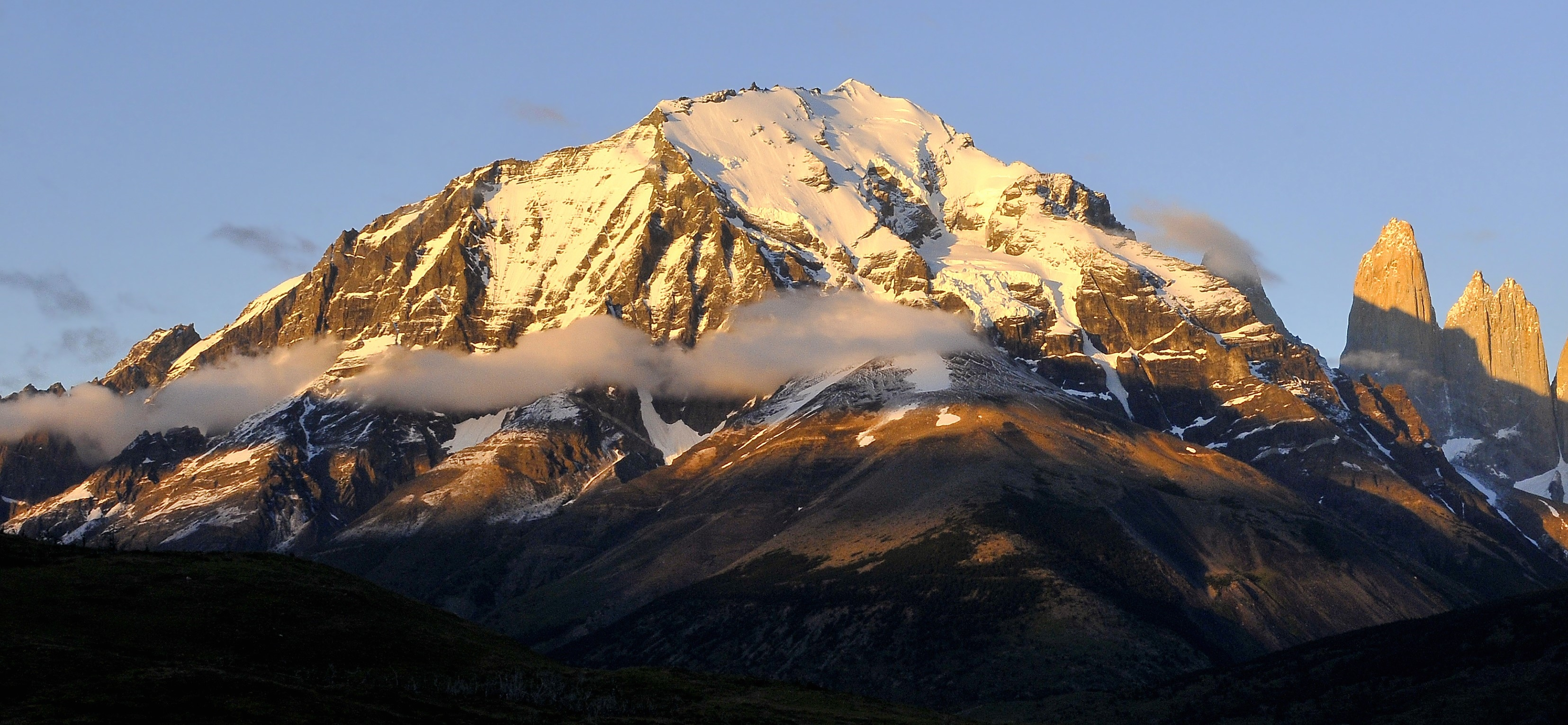
- East aspect

Highest point
- Elevation: 2,697 m (8,848 ft)
- Prominence: 1,072 m (3,517 ft)
- Parent peak: Cerro Paine Grande
- Isolation: 2.66 km (1.65 mi)
- Coordinates: 50°58′21″S 72°57′50″W

Naming
- Etymology: Mount Admiral Nieto

Geography
- Location within Chile Location within Southern Patagonia Location within South America
- Interactive map of Monte Almirante Nieto
- Country: Chile
- Province: Última Esperanza Province
- Protected area: Torres del Paine National Park
- Parent range: Andes; Cordillera Paine
- Topo map: IGM 1:50,000 Paine (Hoja Paine)

Geology
- Rock age: Miocene
- Rock type(s): Granite, Metamorphic rock

Climbing
- First ascent: 1937

Monte Almirante Nieto is a mountain in the Magallanes Region of Chile.

== Description ==
Monte Almirante Nieto is a 2,697-meter-elevation (8,848-foot) summit in the Cordillera Paine group of the Andes. The peak is located 97 kilometers (60 miles) north-northwest of Puerto Natales, and the peak is the third-highest in Torres del Paine National Park. The west summit of the mountain is called Paine Chico, or Cerro Paine Chico (2,640 m). Precipitation runoff from the mountain's slopes drains into Nordenskjöld Lake which is part of the Paine River watershed. Topographic relief is significant as the summit rises over 2,600 meters (8,530 feet) above the lake in five kilometers (3.1 miles). The nearest higher peak is Cerro Paine Grande, 2.7 kilometers (1.7 miles) to the west.

== Climbing history ==
The first ascent of Monte Almirante Nieto was accomplished in 1937 by German climbers Hans Teufel and Stefan Zuck via the northeast slope. The ascent is notable as it represents the first mountain climbed in the Cordillera Paine.

== Climate ==
Based on the Köppen climate classification, Monte Almirante Nieto is located in a tundra climate zone with long, cold winters, and short, cool summers. Weather systems are forced upward by the mountains (orographic lift), causing moisture to drop in the form of rain and snow. This climate supports a small glacier on the south slope. The months of December through February offer the most favorable weather for visiting or climbing in this area, however the region is characterized by low temperatures and strong winds throughout the year.

== Etymology ==
The mountain's toponym translates as "Mount Admiral Nieto." There is no definitive explanation for who the namesake is, with one theory suggesting it might be Admiral Francisco Nieto Gallegos of the Chilean Navy who would have been the first to sight the Paine massif in 1898. Other theories speculate that the 1937 first ascent team named it in honor of the person who helped them obtain the climbing permit that authorized the expedition.

== Geology ==
The range is made up of granite underlain by grey gabbro-diorite laccolith and the sedimentary rocks it intrudes, deeply eroded by glaciers. The steep, light colored faces are eroded from the tougher, vertically jointed granitic rocks, while the foothills and dark cap rocks are the sedimentary country rock, in this case flysch deposited in the Cretaceous and later folded.

The radiometric age for the quartz diorite is 12 ± 2 million years by the rubidium-strontium method and 13 ± 1 million years by the potassium-argon method. More precise ages of 12.59 ± 0.02 and 12.50 ± 0.02 million years for the earliest and latest identified phases of the intrusion, respectively, were achieved using Uranium–lead dating methods on single zircon crystals. Basal gabbro and diorite were dated by a similar technique to 12.472 ± 0.009 to 12.431 ± 0.006 million years. Thus, magma was intruded and crystallized over 162 ± 11 thousand years.

== Gallery ==
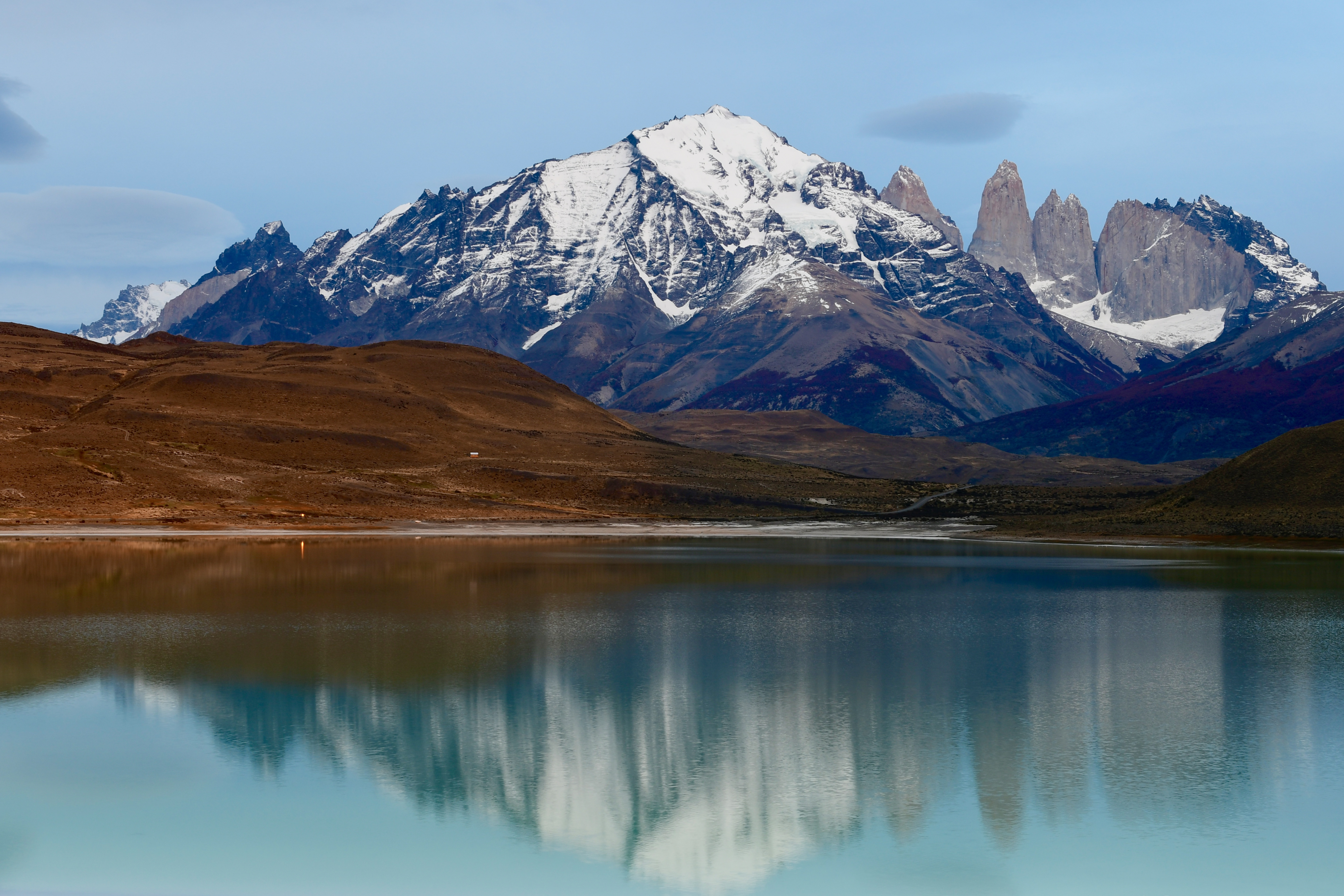
East aspect

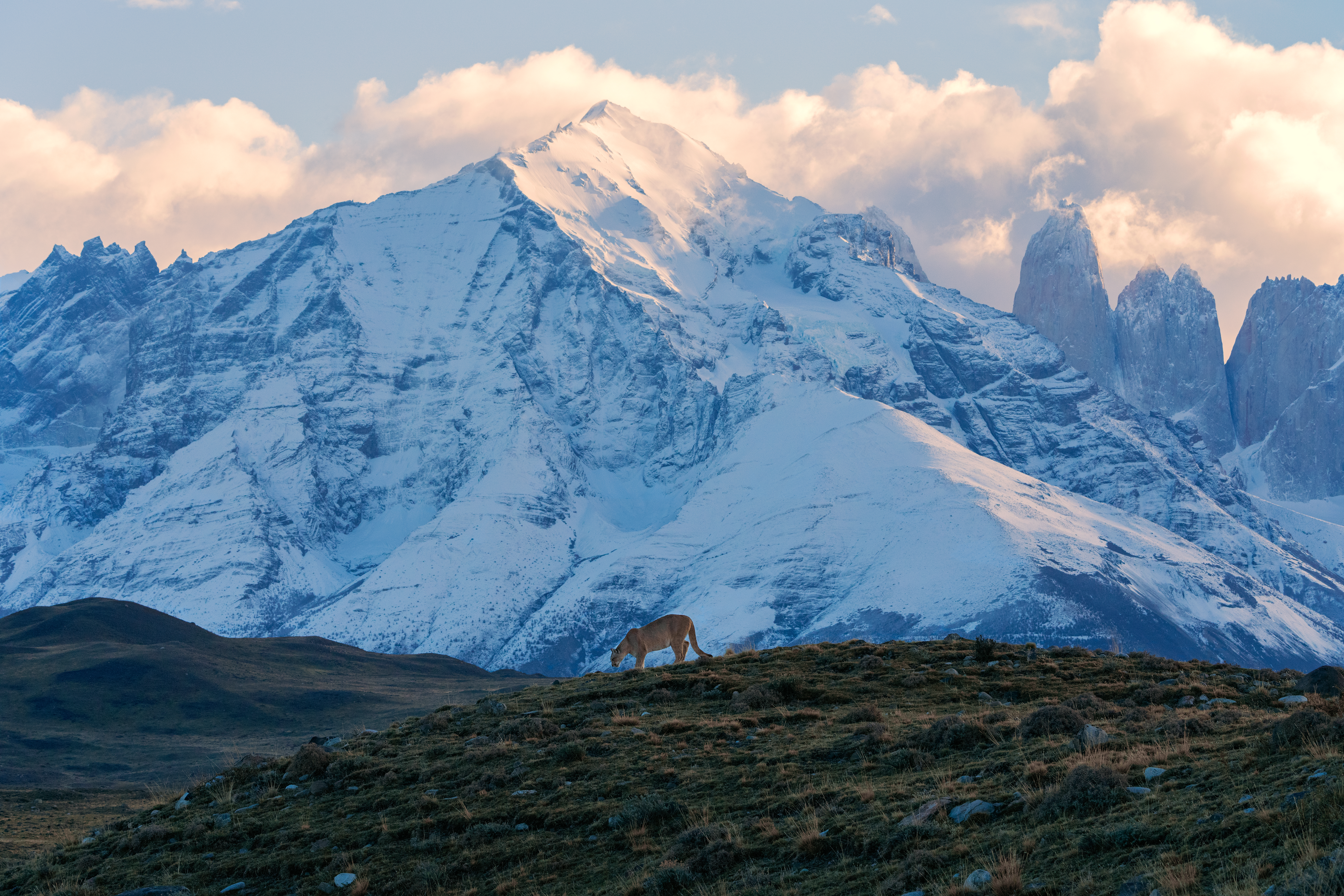
East aspect

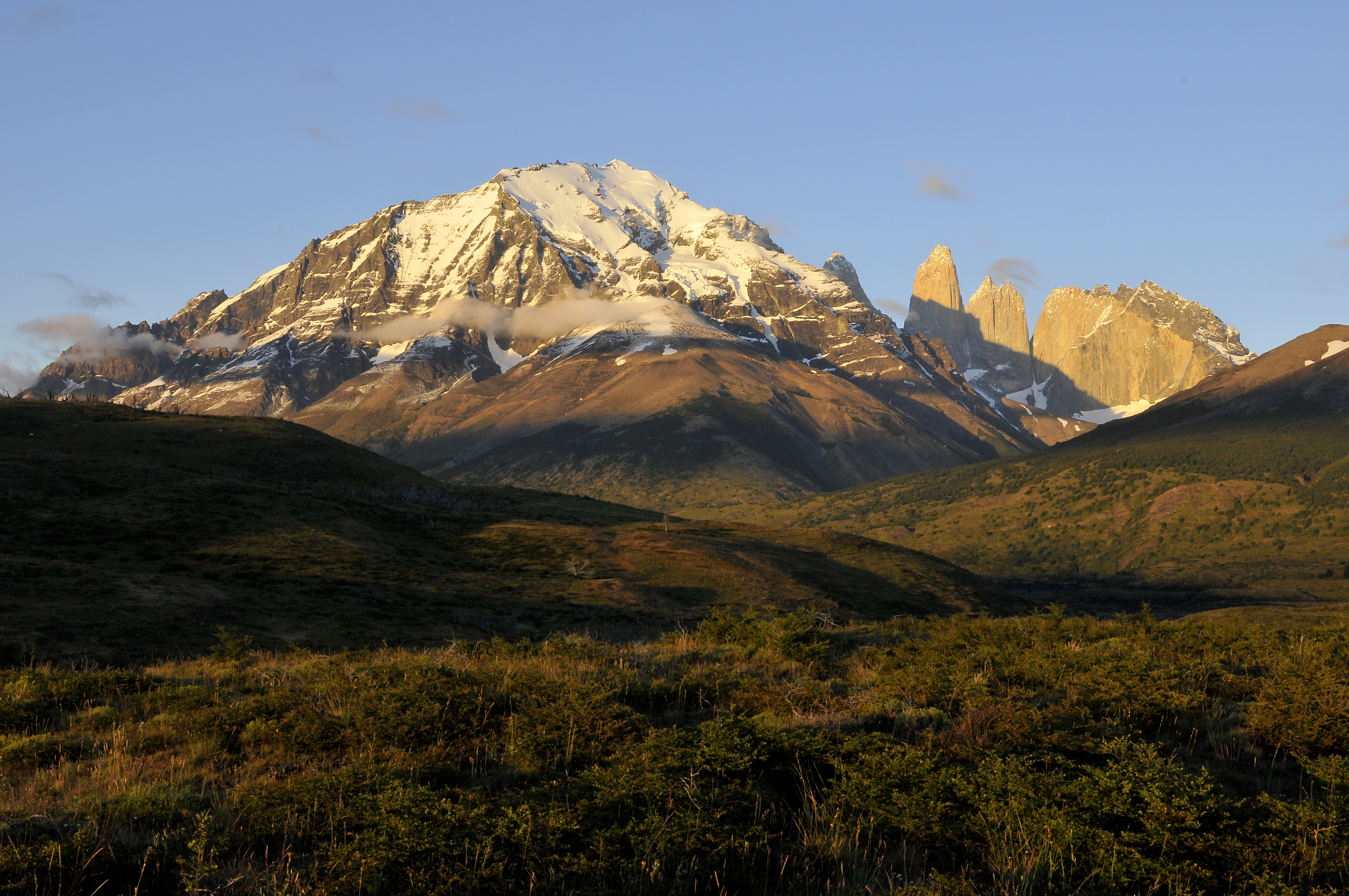
East aspect of Monte Almirante Nieto with Paine Towers behind

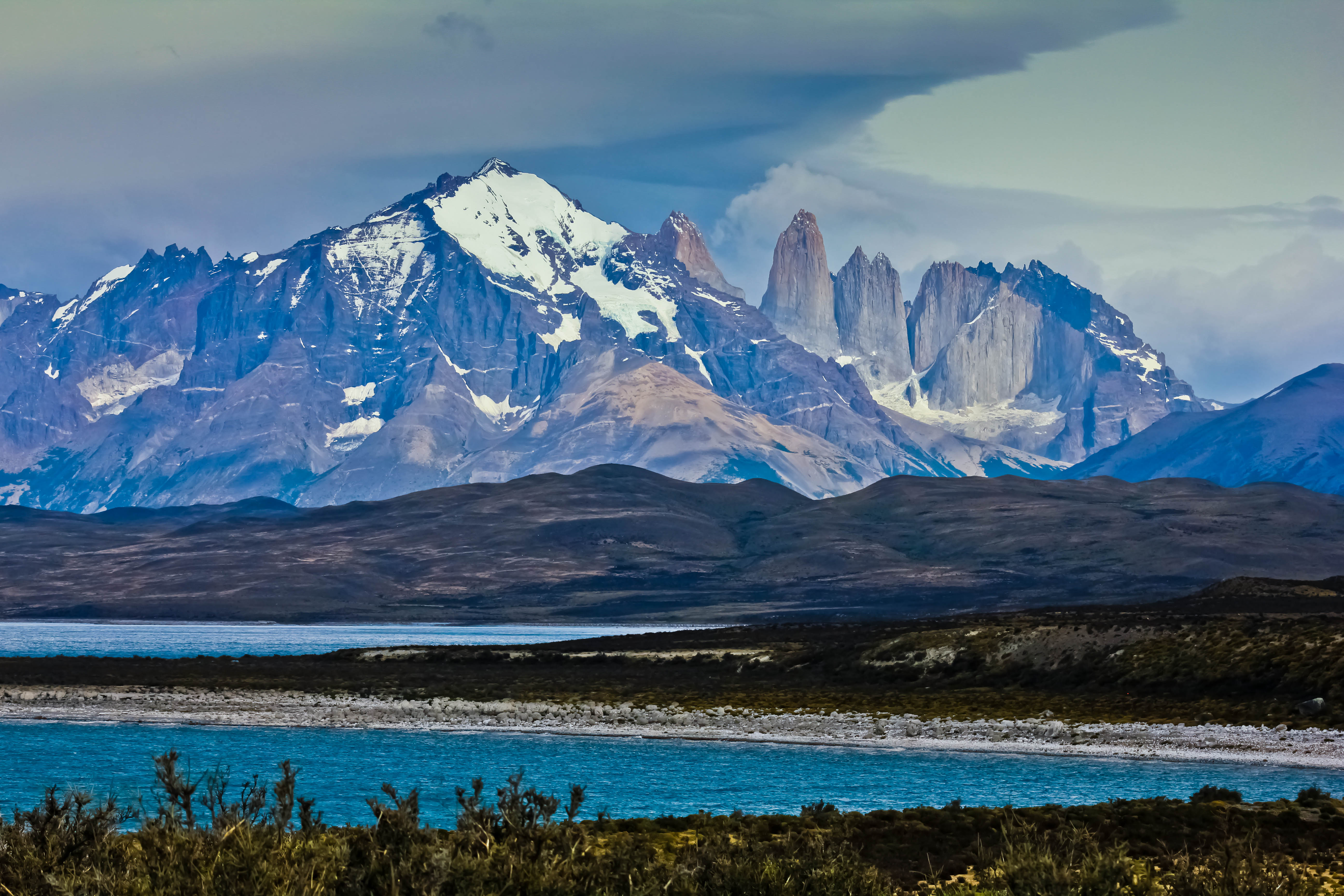
East aspect of Monte Almirante Nieto (left of center)

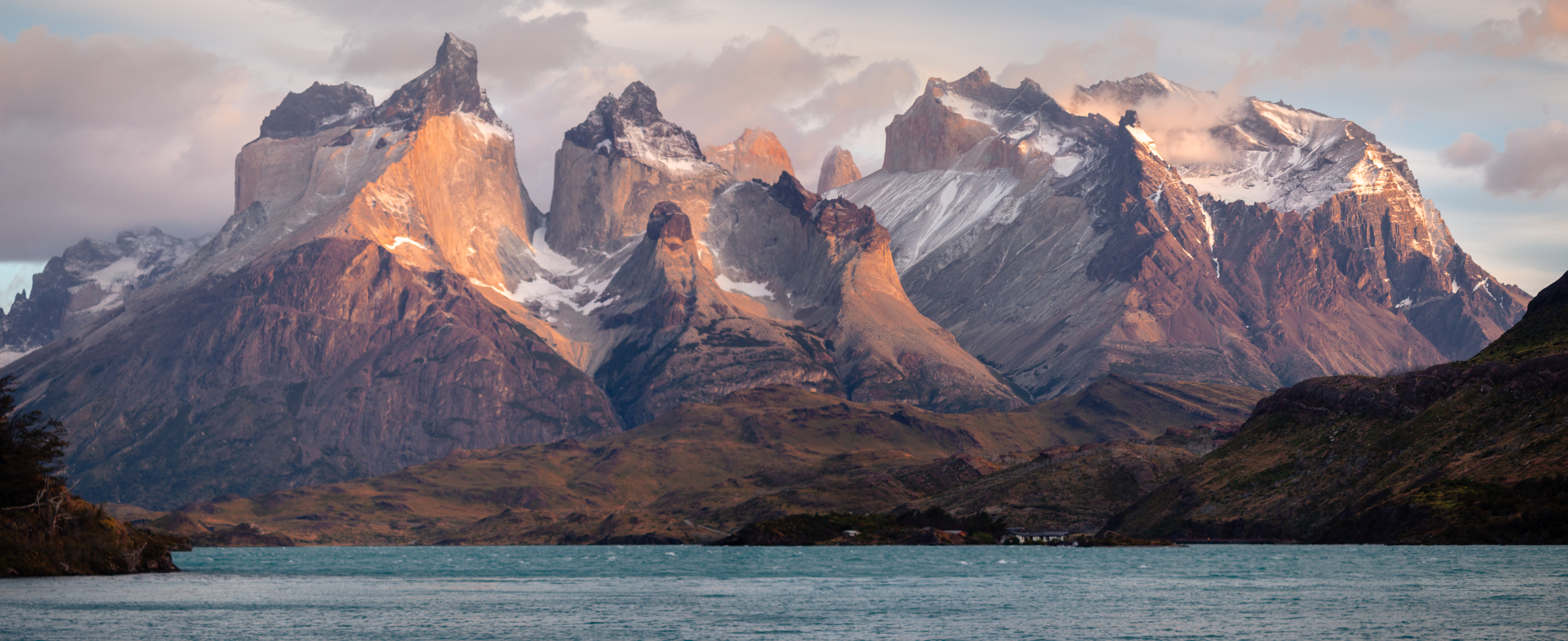
Cuernos del Paine (left) and Monte Almirante Nieto (right)

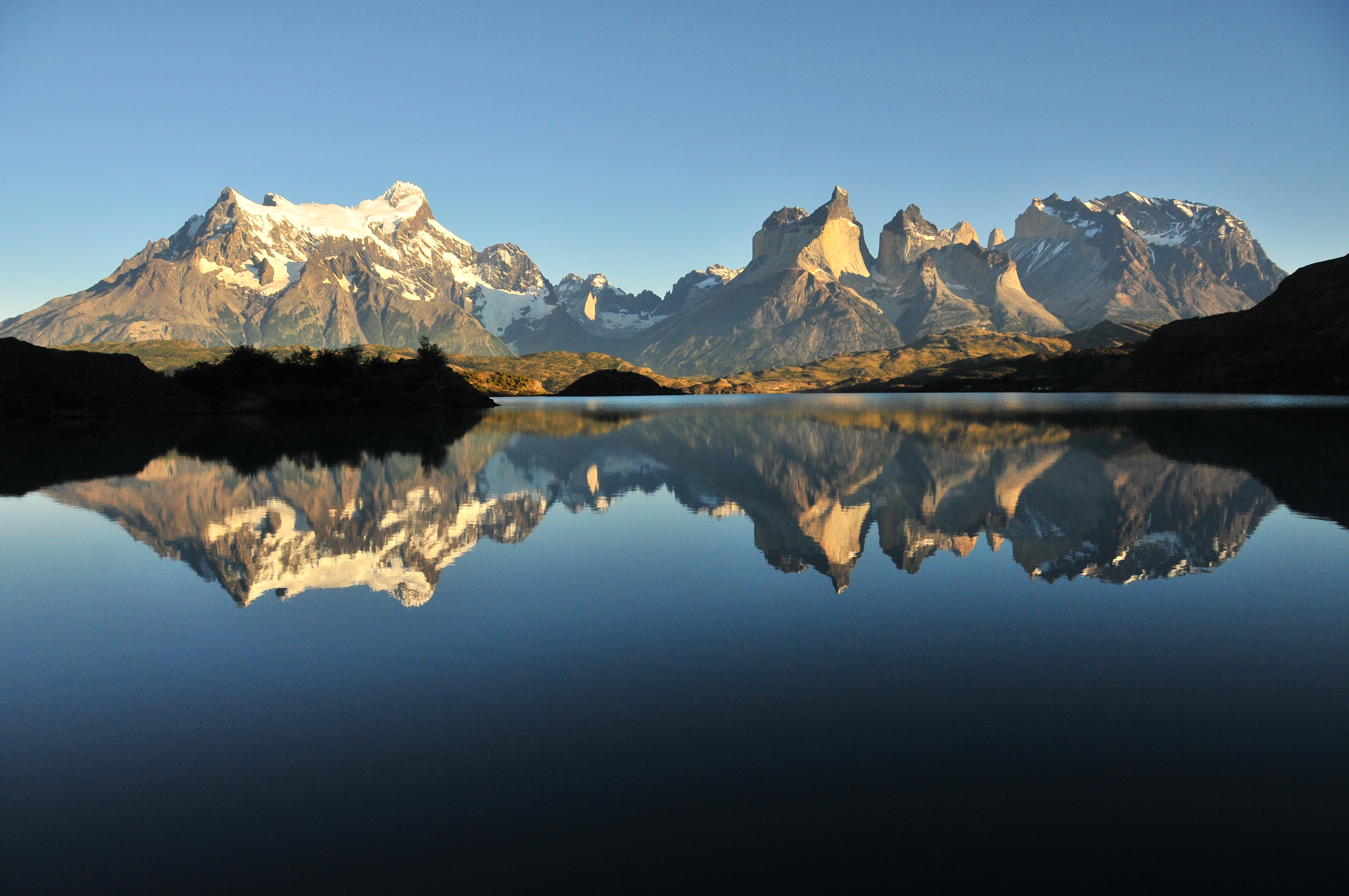
Cerro Paine Grande (left), Cuernos del Paine right of center, Monte Almirante Nieto (right)

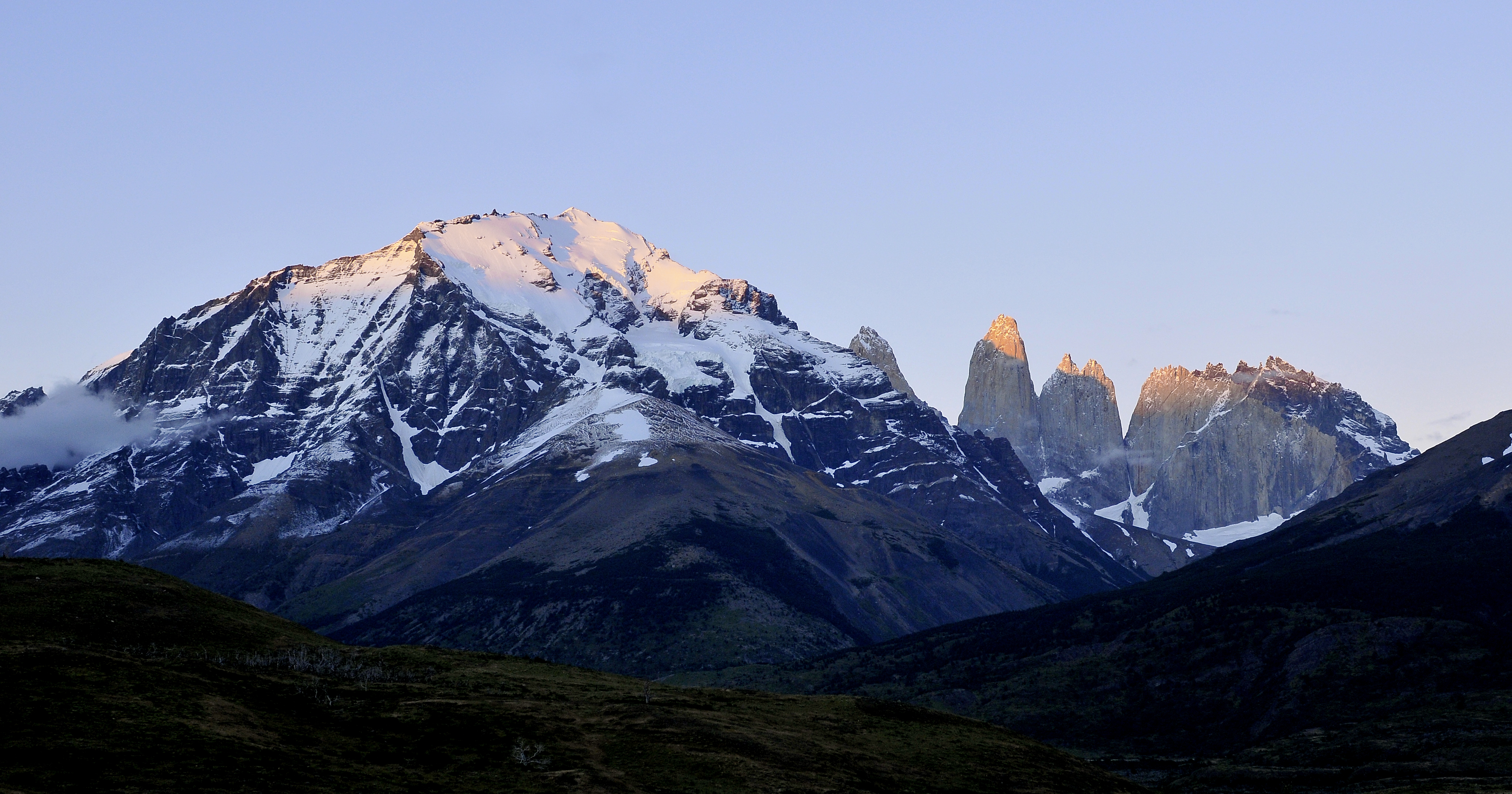
East aspect of Monte Almirante Nieto with Paine Towers behind

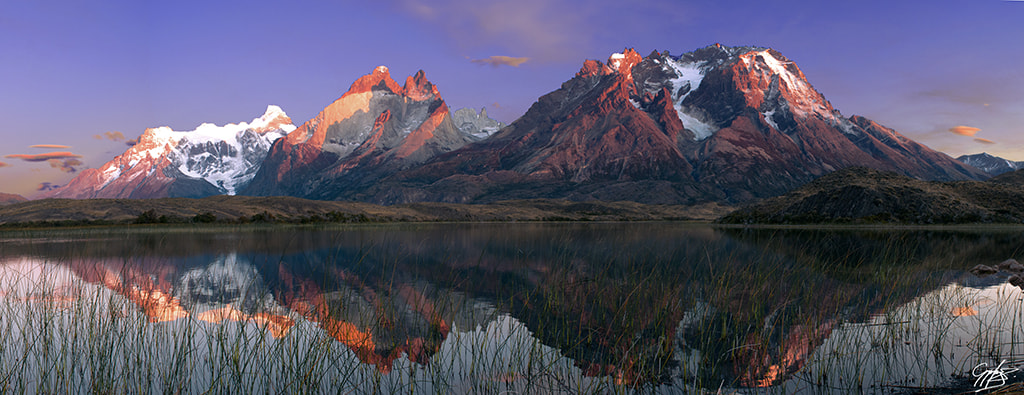
Cerro Paine Grande (left), Cuernos del Paine left of center, Monte Almirante Nieto (right)

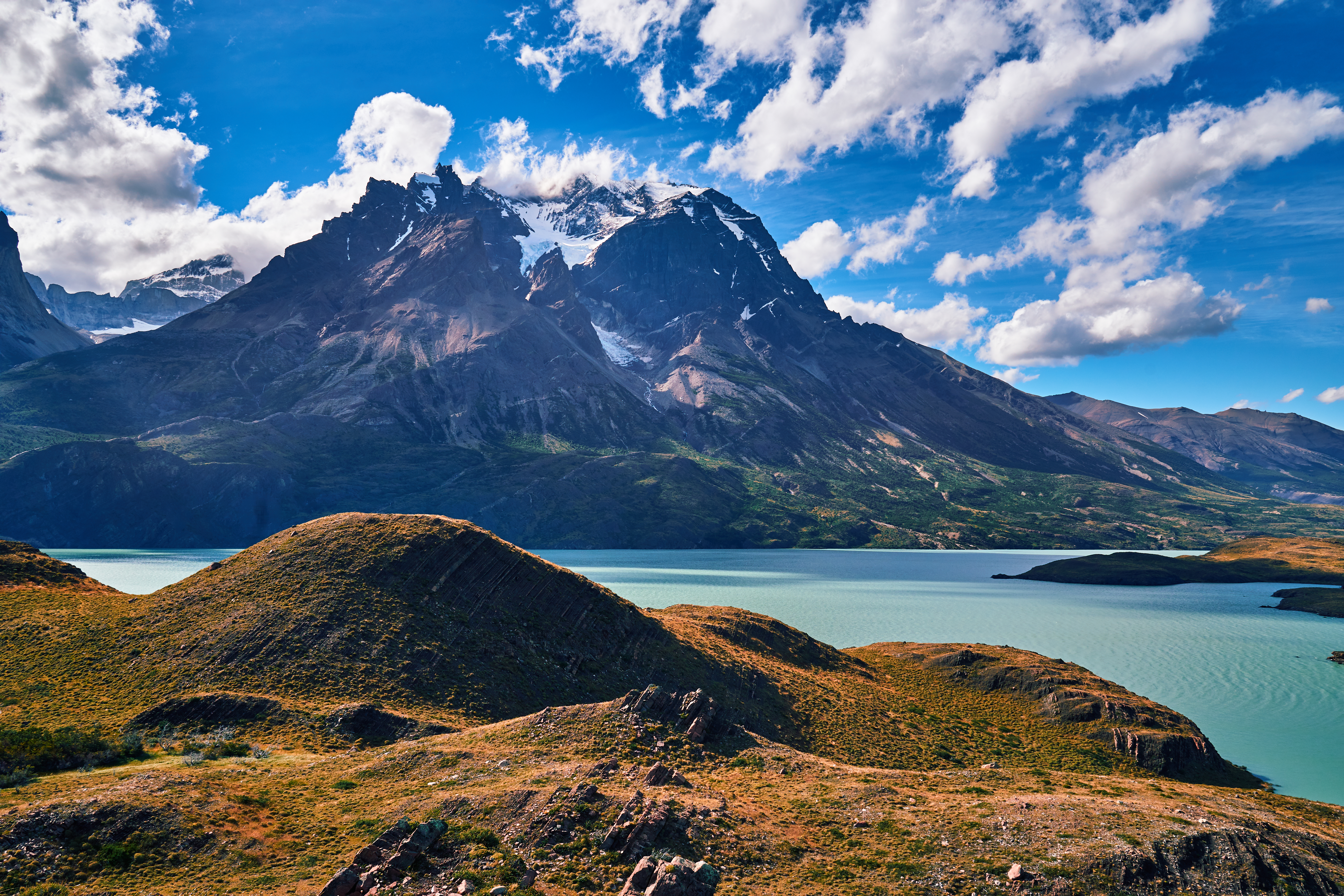
South aspect

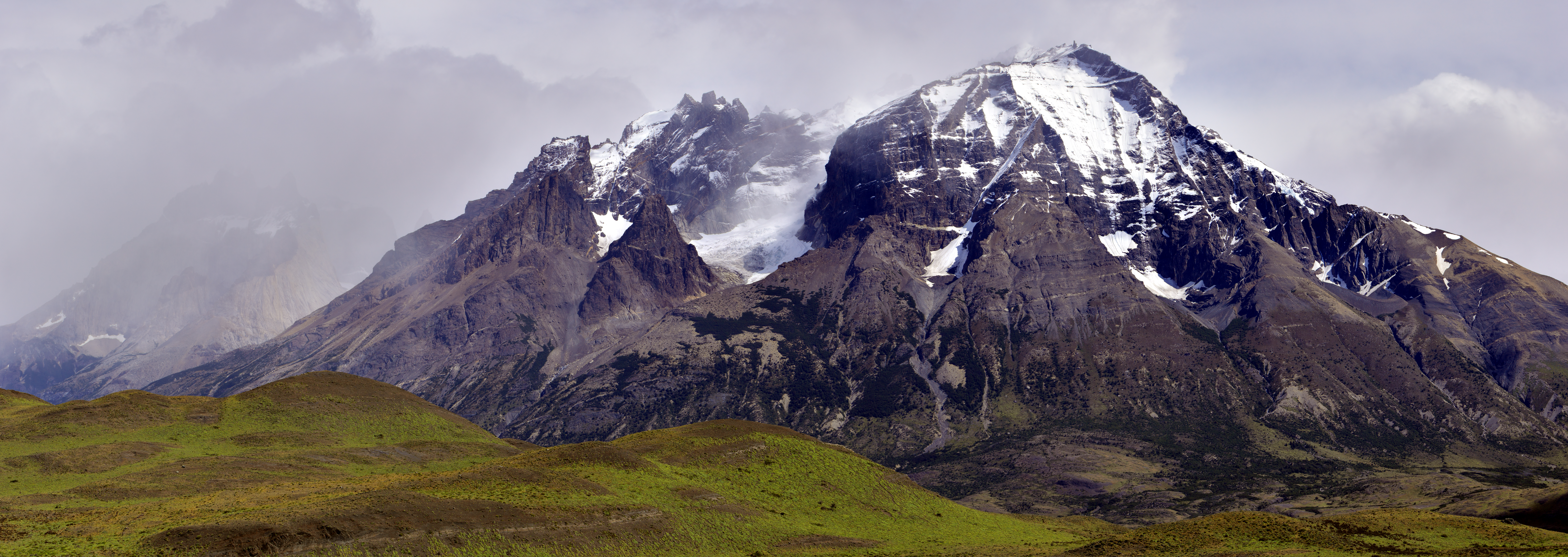
Southeast aspect

Monte Almirante Nieto (right)

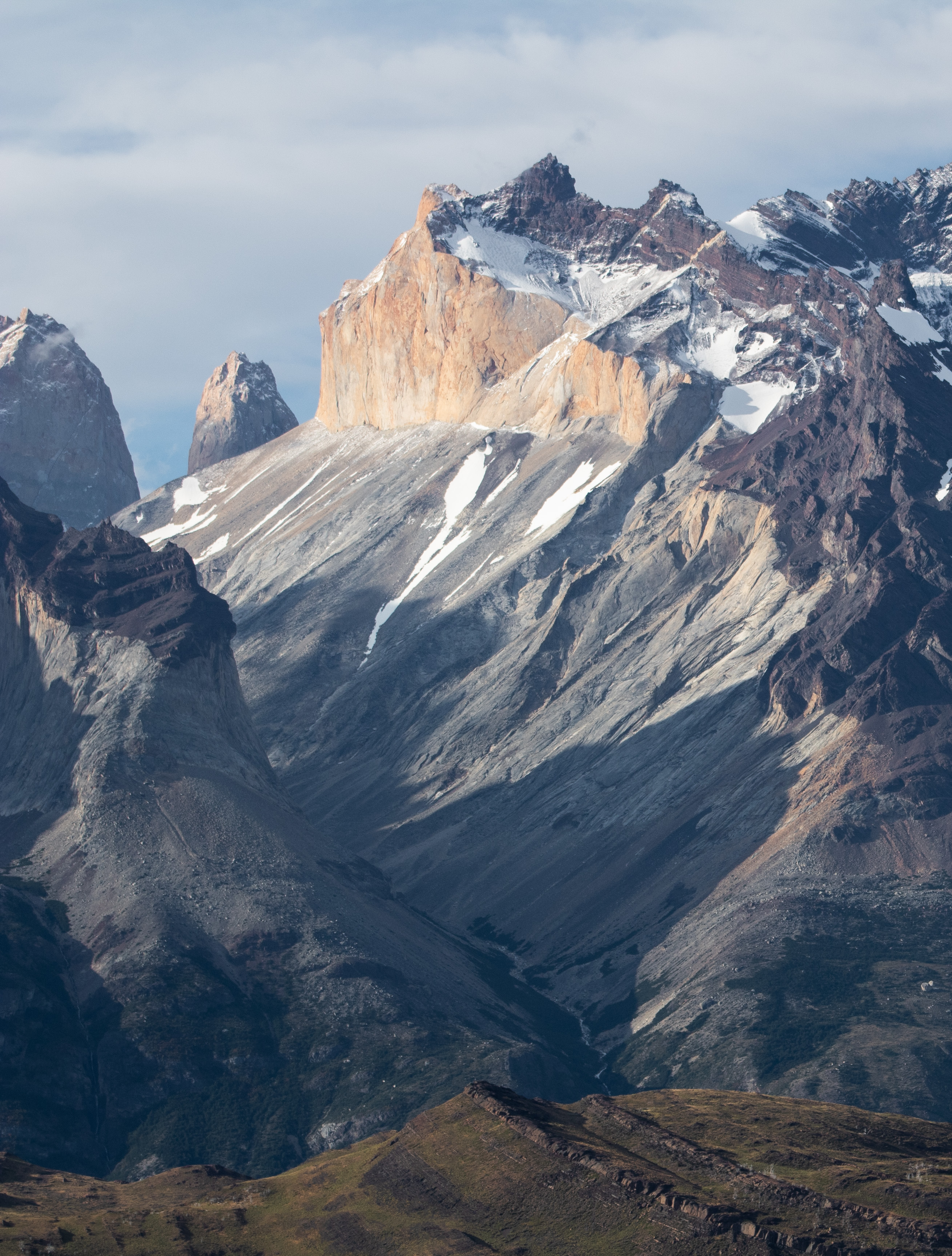
"Paine Chico", the west summit of Monte Almirante Nieto, featuring the large granite west wall

== See also ==
- Patagonia
