= Cordillera Paine =

Mountain group in Torres del Paine, Chile

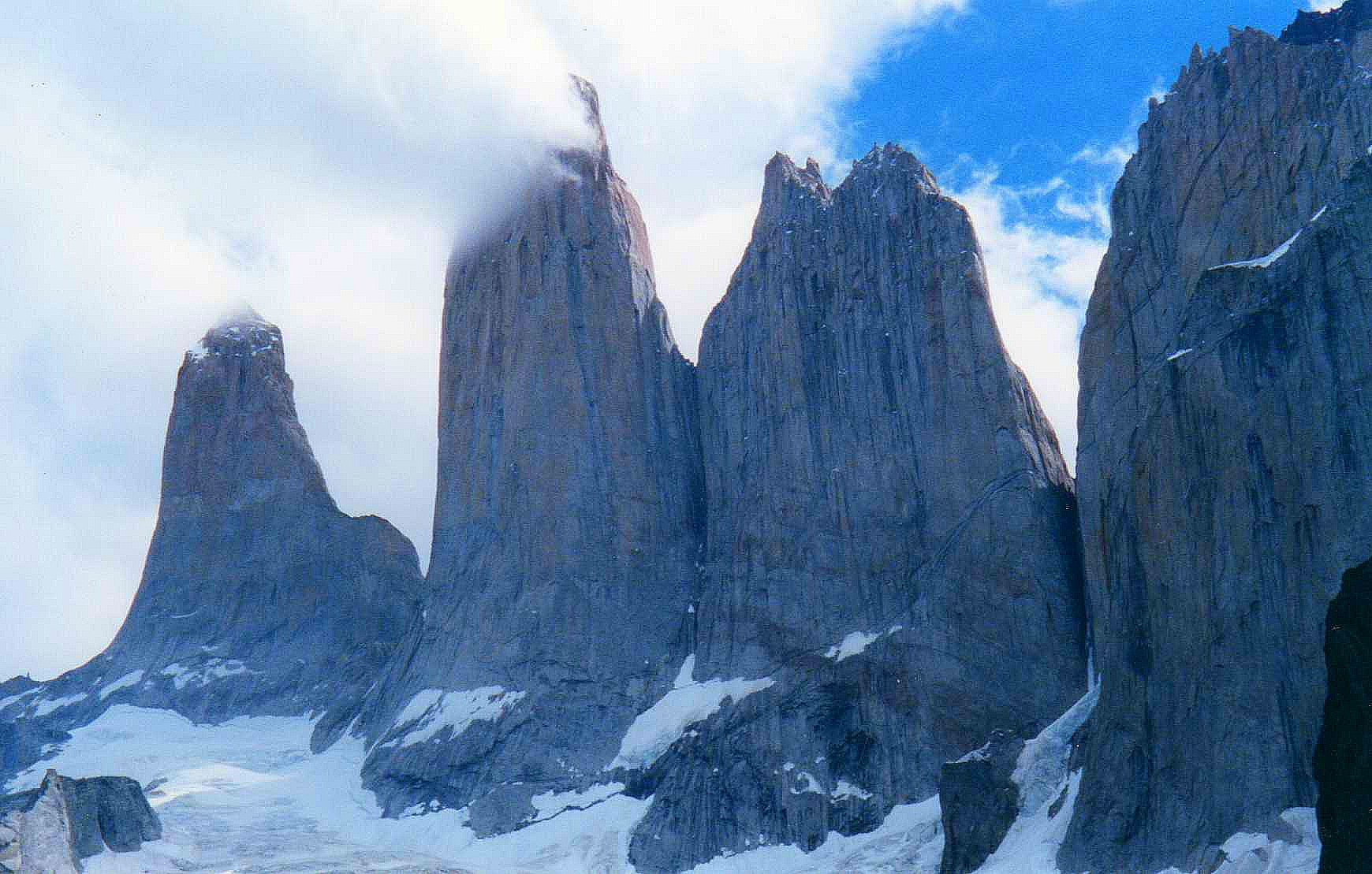
- Torres del Paine

Highest point
- Peak: Cerro Paine Grande
- Elevation: 2,884 m (9,462 ft)
- Coordinates: 50°59′56″S 73°05′43″W

Geography
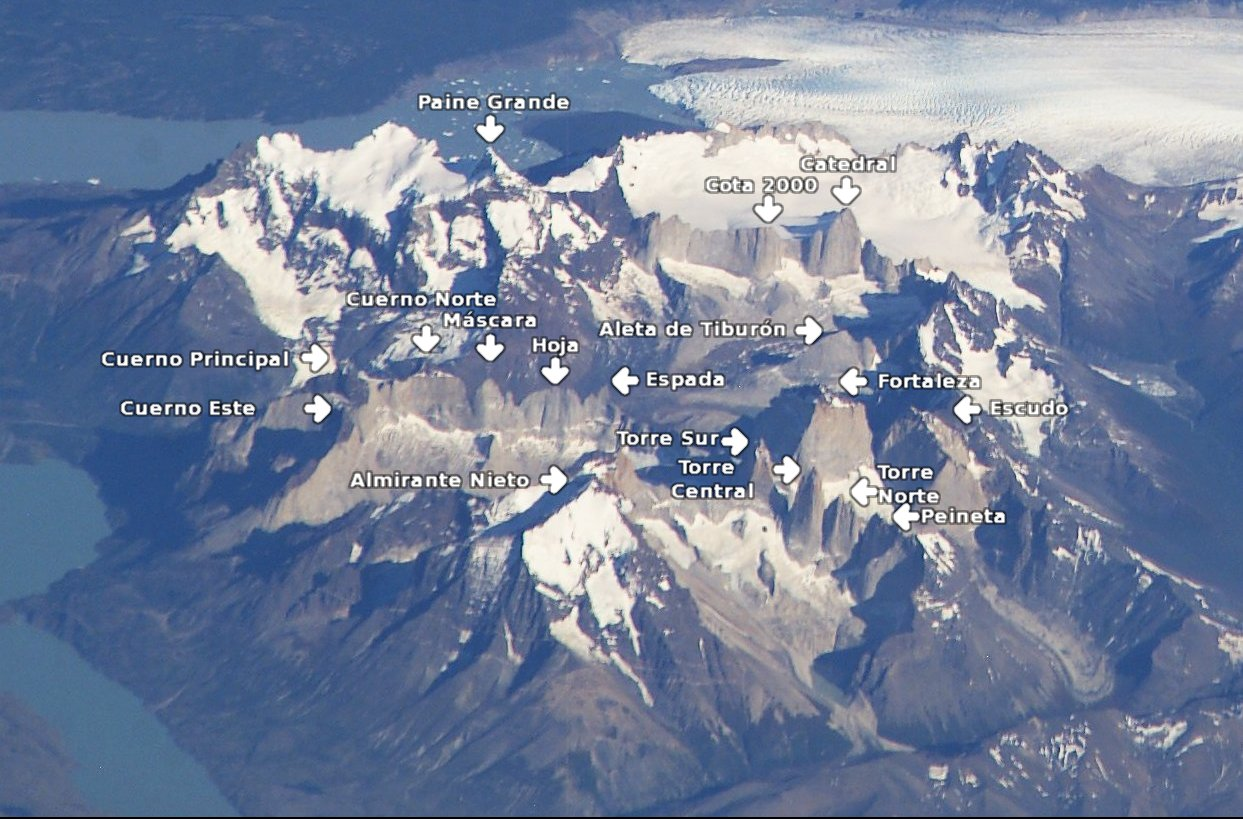
- NASA image with annotations
- Country: Chile
- Region: Magallanes y Antártica Chilena
- Range coordinates: 51°S 73°W
- Parent range: Patagonian Andes

Geology
- Rock age: 12 Myr
- Rock type: Granite

The Cordillera Paine is a group of mountains (a cordillera) in Torres del Paine National Park in Chilean Patagonia. It is 280 km (170 mi) north of Punta Arenas, and about 1,960 km (1,220 mi) south of the Chilean capital Santiago. The cordillera is part of the Commune of Torres del Paine in Última Esperanza Province of Magallanes and Antártica Chilena Region. No accurate surveys have been published, and published elevations have been claimed to be seriously inflated, so most of the elevations given on this page are approximate. Paine means "blue" in the native Tehuelche (Aonikenk) language and is pronounced PIE-nay.

== Peaks ==
The highest summit of the range is Cerro Paine Grande. For a long time its elevation was claimed to be 3,050 or 3,251 m (10,007 or 10,666 ft), but in August 2011 it was climbed for the third time, measured using GPS and found to be 2,884 m (9,462 ft).

The three Towers of Paine (Spanish: Torres del Paine) form the centrepiece of Parque Nacional Torres del Paine. The South Tower of Paine (about 2,500 m (8,200 ft) in elevation, is now thought to be the highest of the three, although this has not been definitely established. It was first climbed in 1963 by Armando Aste. The Central Tower (about 2,460 m (8,070 ft) in elevation) was first climbed in 1963 by Chris Bonington and Don Whillans. In 2017, three Belgian climbers, Nico Favresse, Siebe Vanhee and Sean Villanueva O'Driscoll, made the first free ascent up the rock face, which is about 1,200 m (3,900 ft). The North Tower (about 2,260 m (7,410 ft) in elevation) was first climbed in 1958 by Guido Monzino.

Other summits include the Cuerno Principal, about 2,100 m (6,900 ft) in elevation, and Cerro Paine Chico, which is usually quoted at about 2,650 m (8,690 ft).

== Geology ==
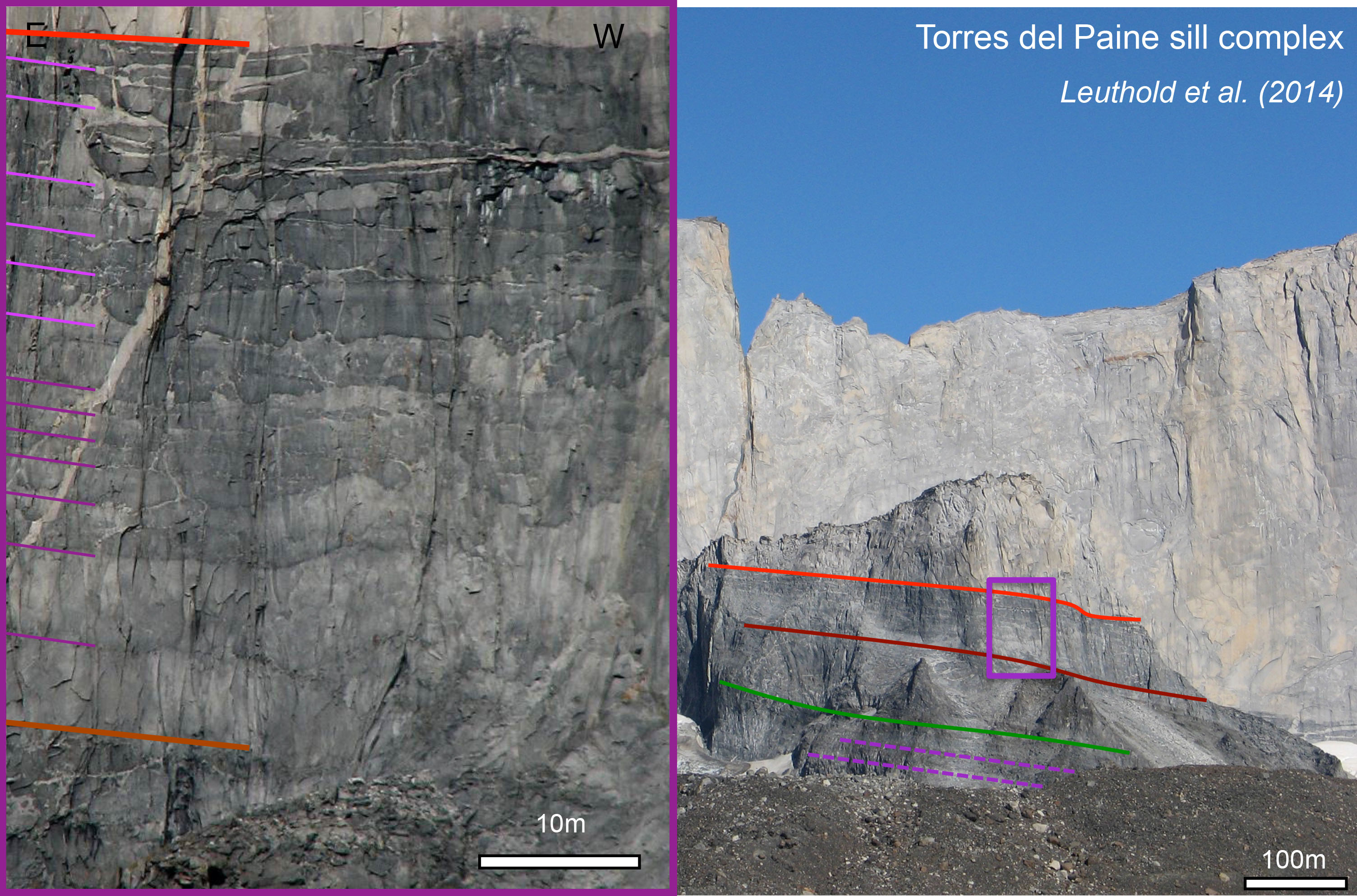
Torres del Paine mafic sill complex built up by successive magma injections

The range is made up of a yellowish granite underlain by grey gabbro-diorite laccolith and the sedimentary rocks it intrudes, deeply eroded by glaciers. The steep, light colored faces are eroded from the tougher, vertically jointed granitic rocks, while the foothills and dark cap rocks are the sedimentary country rock, in this case flysch deposited in the Cretaceous and later folded.

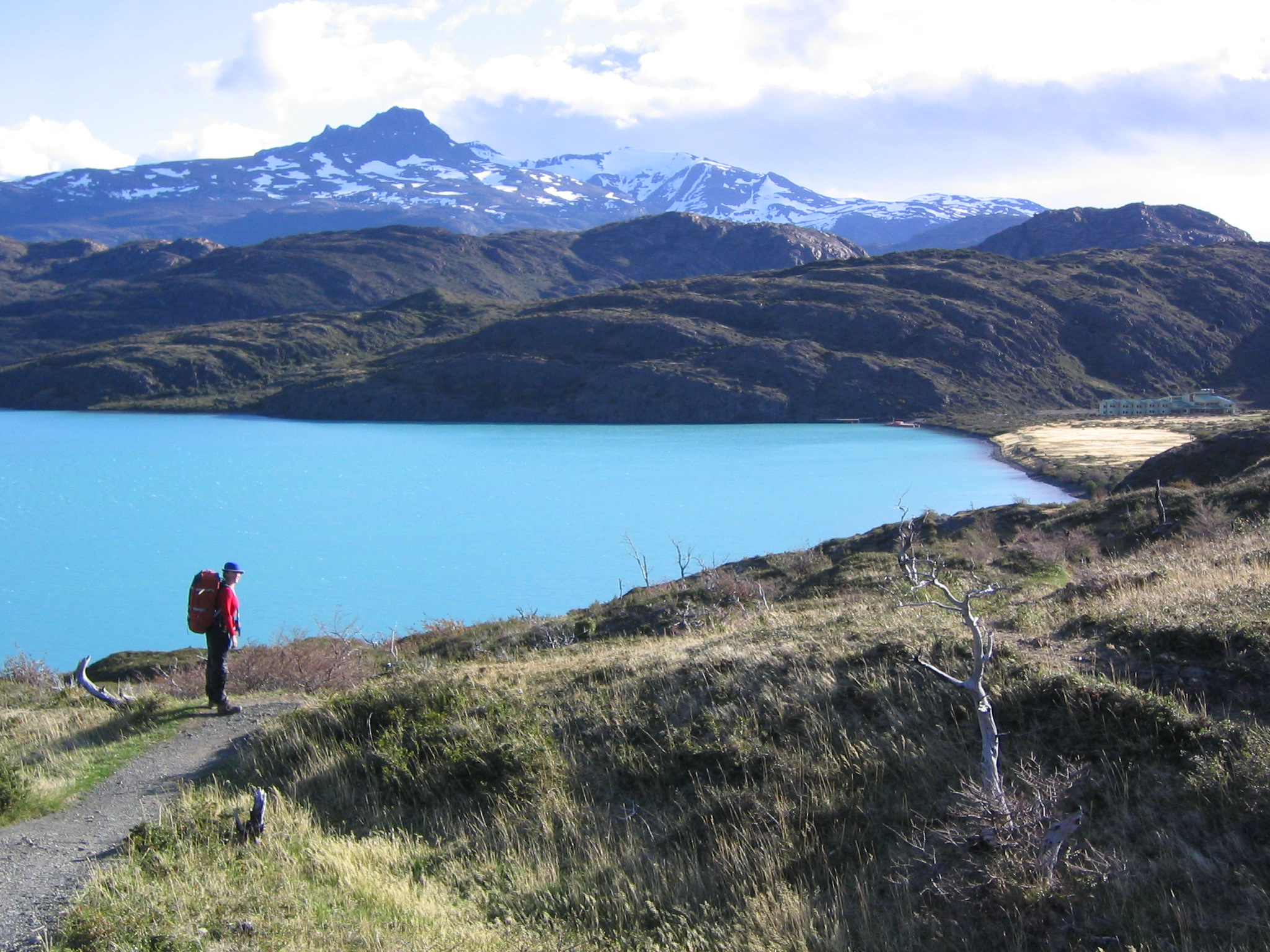
Lago Pehoé

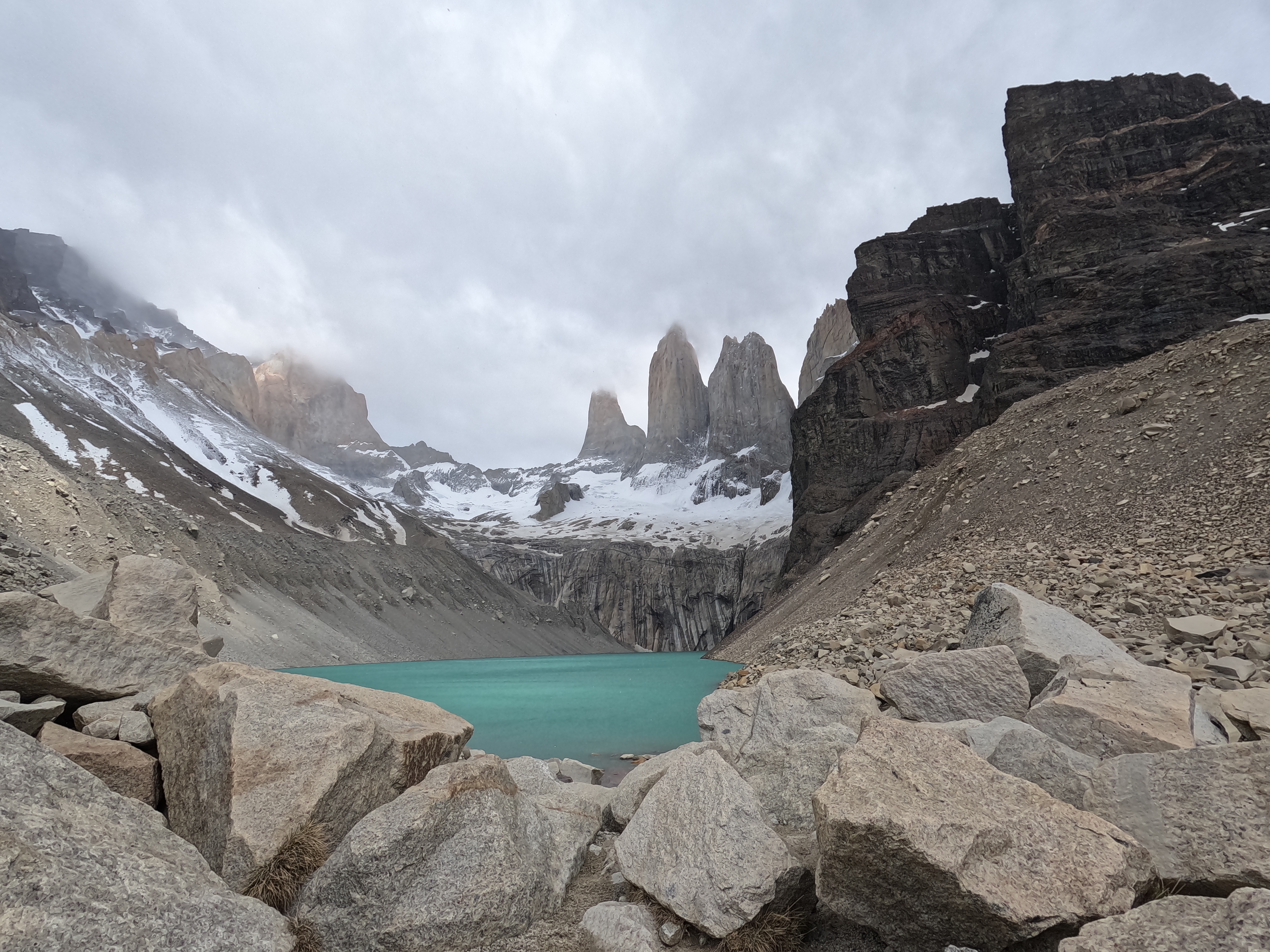
A view of the Torres from Mirador base de las Torres

The radiometric age for the quartz diorite at Cerro Paine is 12 ± 2 million years by the rubidium-strontium method and 13 ± 1 million years by the potassium-argon method. More precise ages of 12.59 ± 0.02 and 12.50 ± 0.02 million years for the earliest and latest identified phases of the intrusion, respectively, were achieved using Uranium–lead dating methods on single zircon crystals. Basal gabbro and diorite were dated by a similar technique to 12.472 ± 0.009 to 12.431 ± 0.006 million years. Thus, magma was intruded and crystallized over 162 ± 11 thousand years. High resolution dating and excellent 3-D exposure of the laccolith and its vertical feeding system allow detailed reconstruction of the Torres del Paine fossil magma chamber history.

== Hiking ==
The Torres del Paine National Park—an area of 2,400 km^{2} (930 mi^{2})—was declared a Biosphere Reserve by the UNESCO in 1978 and receives about 250,000 visitors annually. Trails and some campsites are maintained by Chile's National Forest Corporation, and mountain huts provide shelter and basic services.

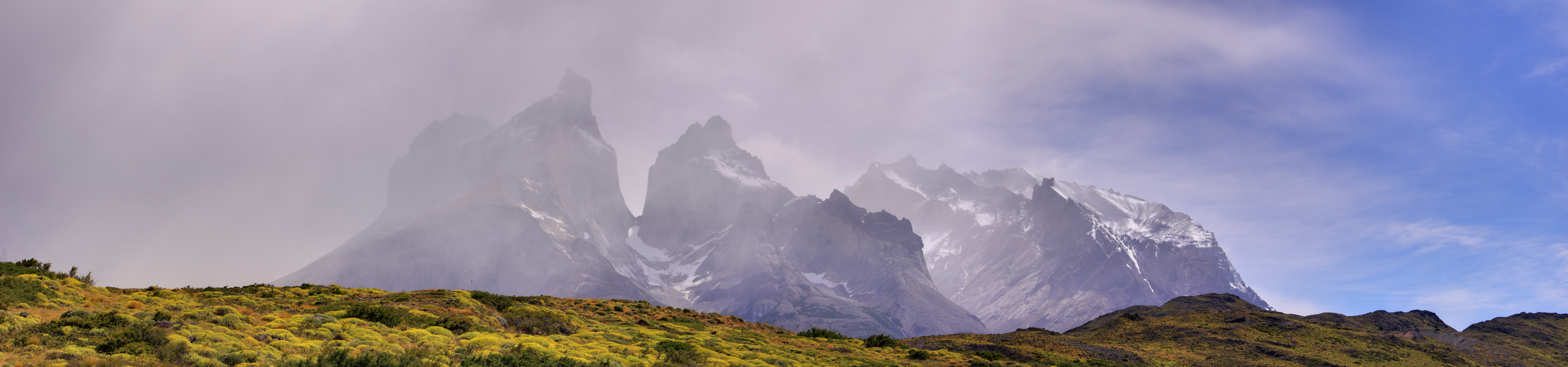
The Cuernos del Paine (horns of Paine), with the typical extreme weather of the region

== See also ==
- Fitz Roy
- Los Glaciares National Park
