= Torres del Paine National Park =

National park in southern Chilean Patagonia

- IUCN category II (national park)
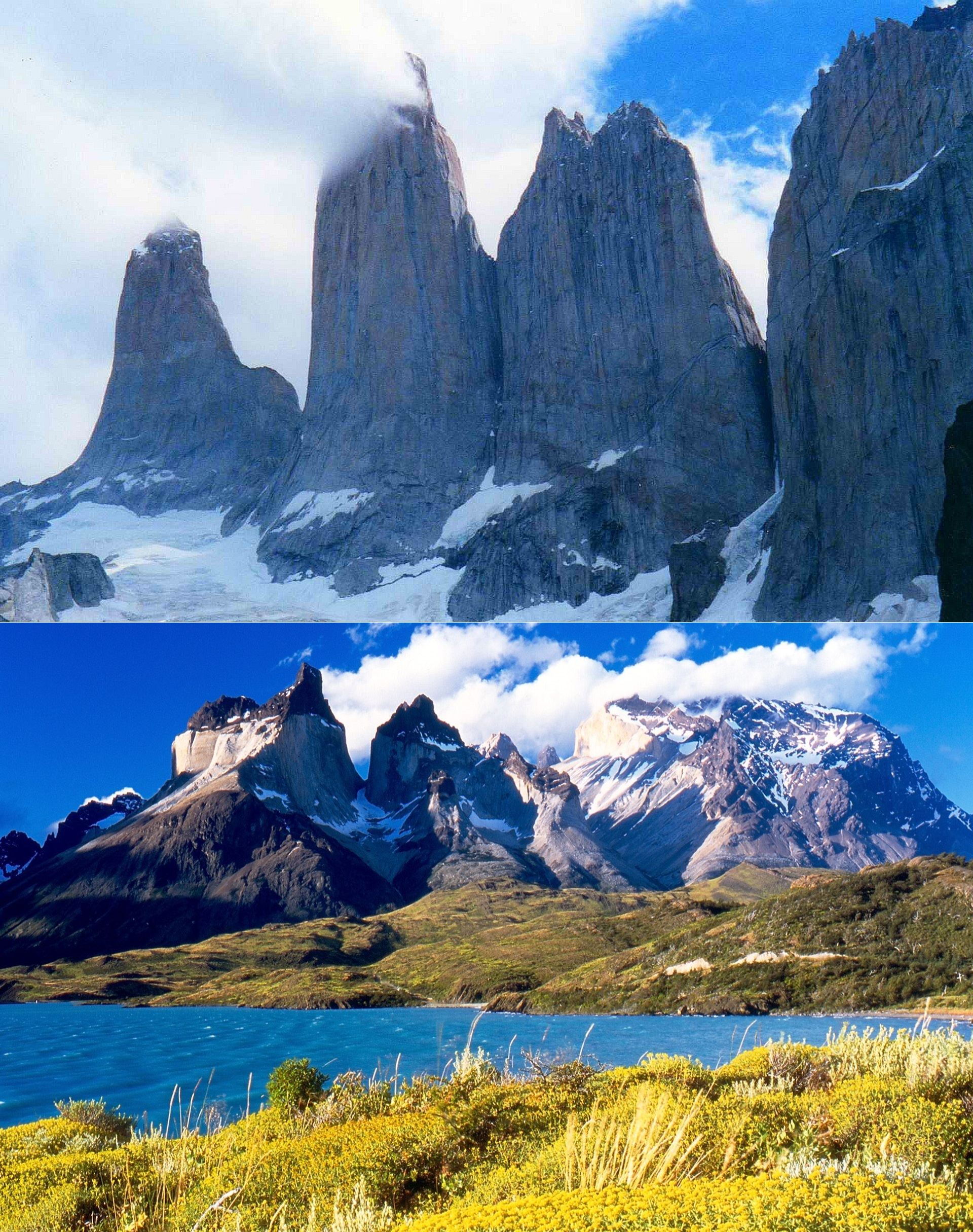
- Torres del Paine (top) and Cuernos del Paine (below)

- Location: Magallanes Region, Chile
- Nearest city: Puerto Natales
- Coordinates: 51°0′0″S 73°0′0″W
- Area: 181,414 ha (448,280 acres)
- Established: May 13, 1959
- Visitors: 304,947 (in 2019)
- Governing body: Corporación Nacional Forestal

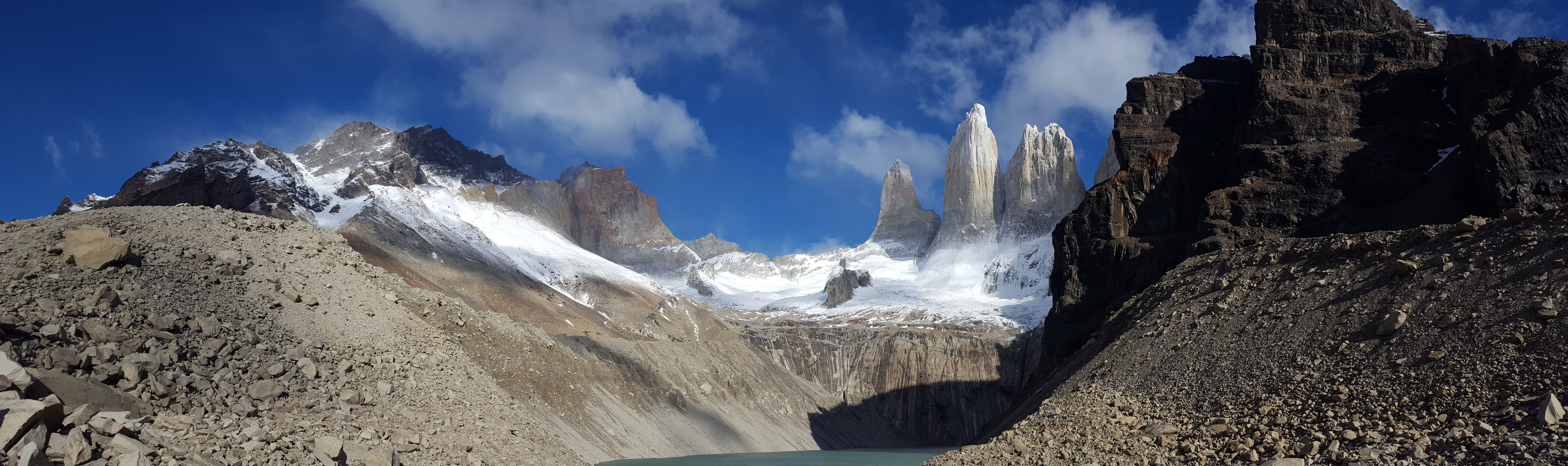
Torres d'Agostini, Torres Central, Torres Monzino

Torres del Paine National Park (Spanish: Parque Nacional Torres del Paine) is a national park encompassing mountains, glaciers, lakes, and rivers in southern Chilean Patagonia. The Cordillera del Paine group of mountains is the park's centerpiece. It lies in a transition area between the Magellanic subpolar forests and the Patagonian Steppes. The park is located 112 km (70 mi) north of Puerto Natales and 312 km (194 mi) north of Punta Arenas. The park borders Bernardo O'Higgins National Park to the west and the Los Glaciares National Park to the north in Argentine territory. It was established as a national park in 1959. Paine means "blue" in the native Tehuelche (Aonikenk) language and is pronounced PIE-neh.

Torres del Paine National Park is part of the Sistema Nacional de Áreas Silvestres Protegidas del Estado de Chile (National System of Protected Forested Areas of Chile). In 2013, it measured approximately 181,414 hectares (700 sq mi). It is one of the largest and most visited parks in Chile. The park averages around 252,000 visitors a year, of which 54% are foreign tourists, who come from many countries worldwide. It is also part of the End of the World Route, a tourist scenic route.

The park is one of the 11 protected areas of the Magallanes Region and Chilean Antarctica (together with four national parks, three national reserves, and three national monuments). Together, the protected forested areas comprise about 51% of the land of the region (6,728,744 hectares (25,980 sq mi)).

The Torres del Paine ("Towers of Paine") is a group of three distinctive granite peaks of the Paine mountain range or Paine Massif. From south to north, they are Torre d'Agostini, Torre Central, and Torre Monzino. They rise 2,500 metres (8,200 ft) above sea level and are joined by the Cuernos del Paine ("Horns of Paine"). The area also boasts valleys, rivers such as the Paine, lakes, and glaciers. The well-known lakes include Grey, Pehoé, Nordenskjöld, and Sarmiento. The glaciers, including Grey, Pingo, and Tyndall, belong to the Southern Patagonia Ice Field.

== History ==
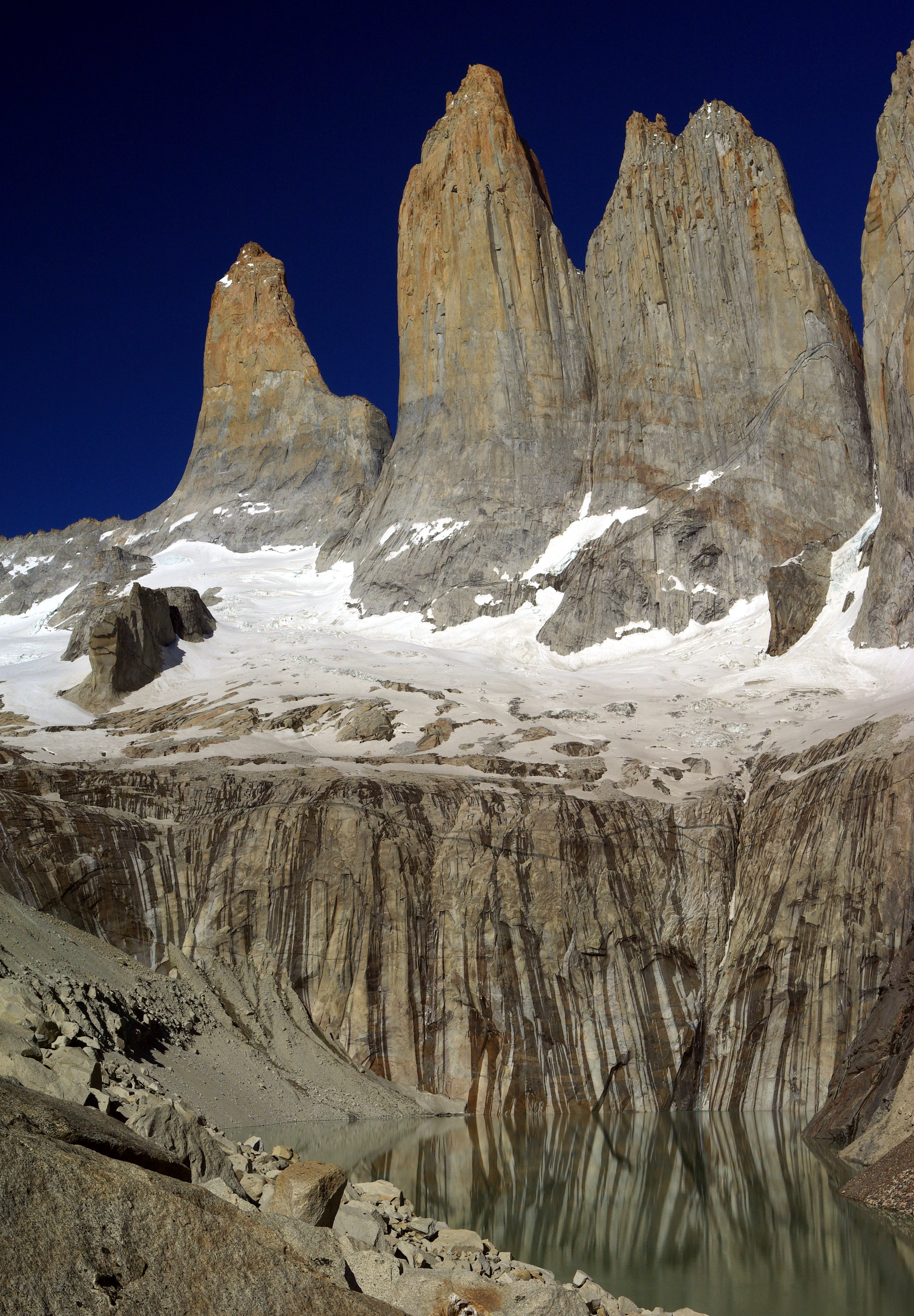
Torres del Paine

Lady Florence Dixie, in her book published in 1880, gave one of the first descriptions of the area and referred to the three towers as Cleopatra's Needles. She and her party are sometimes credited as being the first "foreign tourists" to visit the area that is now called Torres del Paine National Park.

Several European scientists and explorers visited the area in the following decades, including Otto Nordenskjöld, Carl Skottsberg, and Alberto María de Agostini. Gunther Plüschow was the first person to fly over the Paine massif.

The park was established on 13 May 1959 as Parque Nacional de Turismo Lago Grey (Grey Lake National Tourism Park) and was given its present name in 1970.

In 1976, British mountaineer John Garner and two Torres del Paine rangers, Pepe Alarcon and Oscar Guineo pioneered the Circuit trail which circles the Paine massif.

In 1977, Guido Monzino donated 12,000 hectares (30,000 acres) to the Chilean Government when its definitive limits were established. The park was designated a World Biosphere Reserve by UNESCO in 1978.

=== Fires ===
In 1985, a tourist started a fire that burned about 150 km^{2} (58 sq mi) of the park. The blaze affected the areas east and south around Lake Pehoé.

In February 2005, an accidental fire started by a Czech backpacker, which lasted for about ten days, destroyed 155 km^{2} (60 sq mi) of the park, including about 2 km^{2} of native forest. The Czech government offered aid after the fire and donated US$1 million to reforestation efforts.

In late December 2011, a major forest fire burned approximately 176 km^{2} (68 sq mi), destroying 36 km² of native forest. While the fire affected much of the area around Lake Pehoé and the western areas around Lake Sarmiento, it moved away from the Cordillera del Paine, the park's centerpiece. The fire, which was linked to an Israeli backpacker, prompted significant international aid and reforestation efforts.

In 2019 an incipient wildfire caused by a cigarette butt was promptly extinguished by nearby fire brigades of the National Forest Corporation.

Recent paleoenvironmental studies performed within the Park indicate that fires have been a frequent phenomenon at least during the last 12,800 years.

== Climate ==
Map of the Park

According to the Köppen climate classification, the park lies in the “temperate climate of cold rain without a dry season". The meteorological conditions of the park are variable due to the complex orography.

The park is famous for its strong winds. The windiest months are November-January, which coincides with the peak tourism season.

=== Temperatures ===
The zone is characterized by having moderate temperature changes throughout the year, with temperatures reaching an average maximum of 11 °C (52 °F) in February. Winter is cold, with an average high temperature in July of 2 °C (36 °F), and an average low of −3.6 °C (25.5 °F).

=== Precipitation ===
The rainiest months are March and April, with a monthly average rainfall of 80 mm. This represents double the July–October (winter) rainfall, which are the drier months. A study of the exact chemical components of the precipitation in the park has been carried out.

== Hydrology ==
The park possesses a large drainage network, which consists of numerous rivers, streams, lakes, ponds, and cascades that come from the Southern Patagonia Ice Field and flow towards the southeast until the Última Esperanza Sound that bathes the coasts of the city of Puerto Natales. The courses of water come from a longitudinal profile and are very turbulent with brusque changes in course, generated by waterfalls and rapids.

The Southern Patagonian Ice Field takes up the entire western side of the park. The Southern Patagonian Ice Field feeds four main glaciers; they are, from north to south, the glaciers Dickson, Grey, Zapata, and Tyndall. This last glacier is rapidly receding. The largest is Glacier Grey. It is divided into two arms because of the appearance of a peninsula of ice, commonly called the Island or Nunatak, which becomes a little more apparent with each passing year. The eastern arm measures about 1.2 km while the western arm has a width of around 3.6 km. The longitude of the glacier in its path towards the interior of the park is 15 km.

Studies of the glaciers in the park have given scientists a clearer picture of the epochs of the earth, or what happened after the last glacial age.

== Geography ==
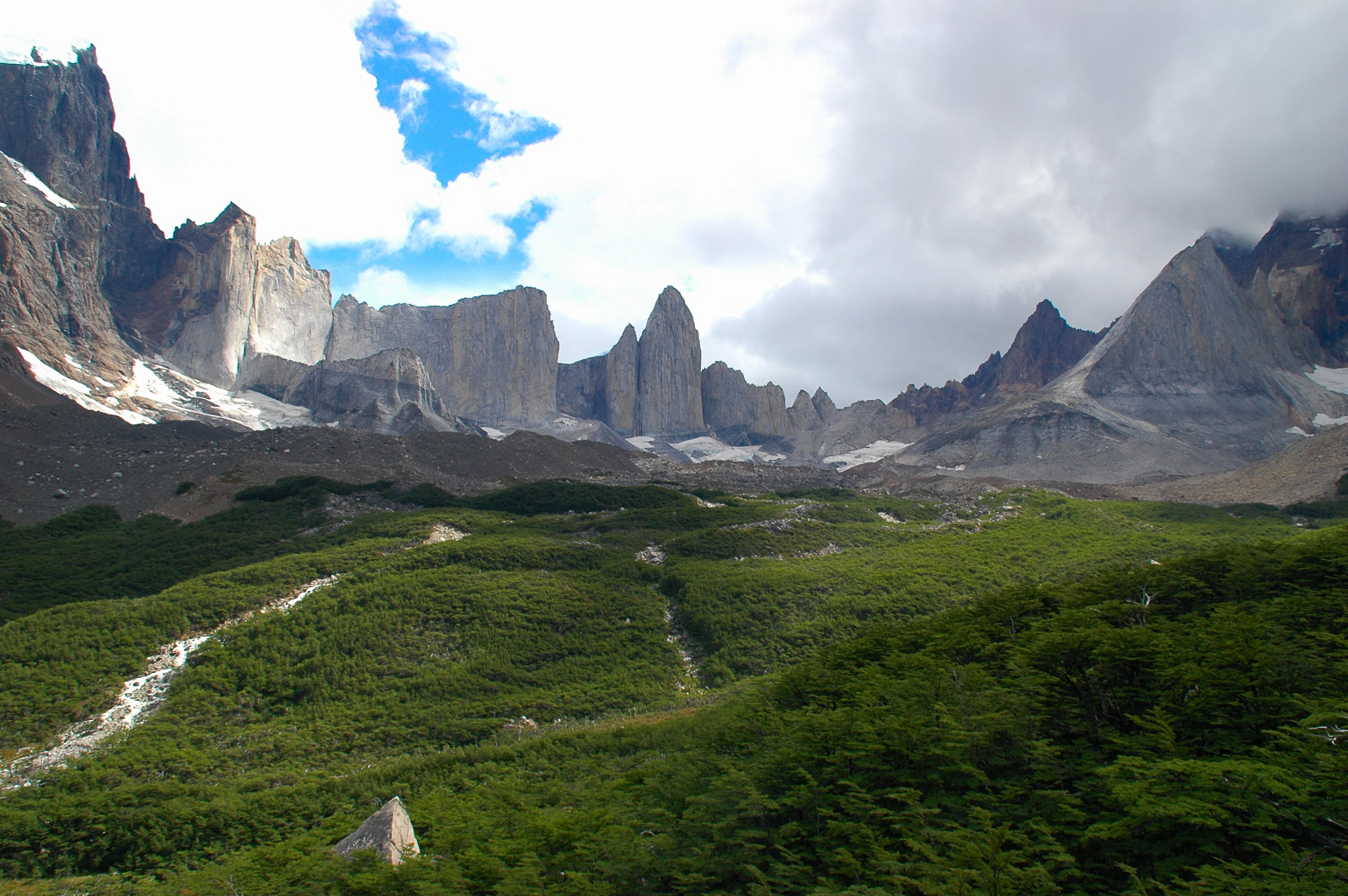
French Valley

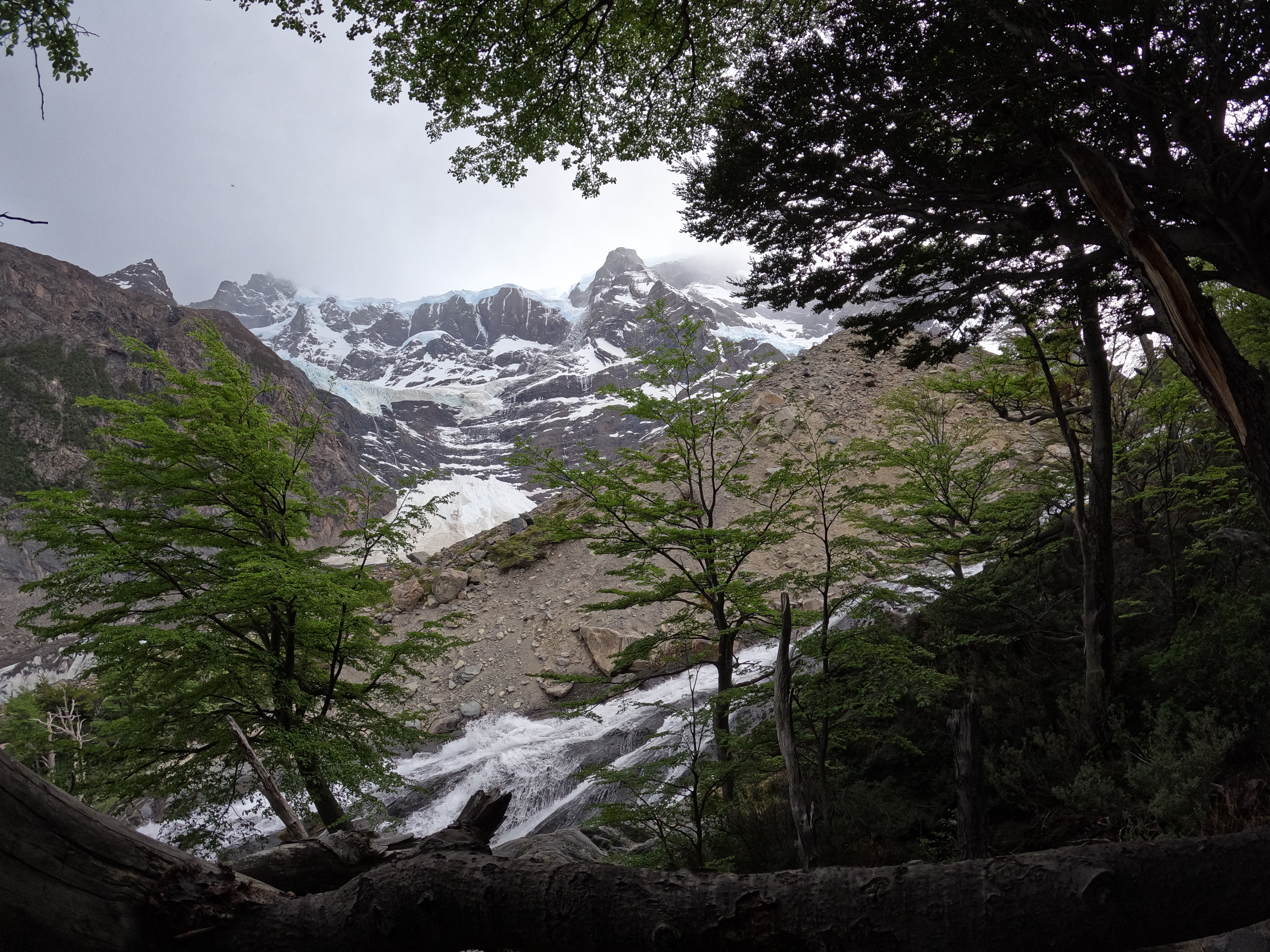
Cerro Paine Grande as seen from the W Trek hiking route, heading toward Mirador Britanico.

The landscape of the park is dominated by the Paine massif, which is an eastern spur of the Andes located on the east side of the Grey Glacier, rising dramatically above the Patagonian steppe. Small valleys separate the granite spires and mountains of the massif. These are: Valle del Francés (French Valley), Valle Bader, Valle Ascencio, and Valle del Silencio (Silence Valley).

The head of French Valley is a cirque formed by tall cliffs. The colossal walls of Cerro Cota 2000 and Cerro Catedral punctuate the western region of the Valley. Cerro Cota 2000 is named for its elevation; its highest contour line is about 2,000 m (6,562 ft). Cerro Catedral is named so because its east face resembles a cathedral's facade. To the north stands the granite arête called Aleta de Tiburón (English: Shark's Fin). To the east, from north to south, lie the peaks Fortaleza (Fortress), La Espada (The Sword), La Hoja (The Blade), La Máscara (The Mummer), Cuerno Norte (North Horn), and Cuerno Principal (Main Horn).

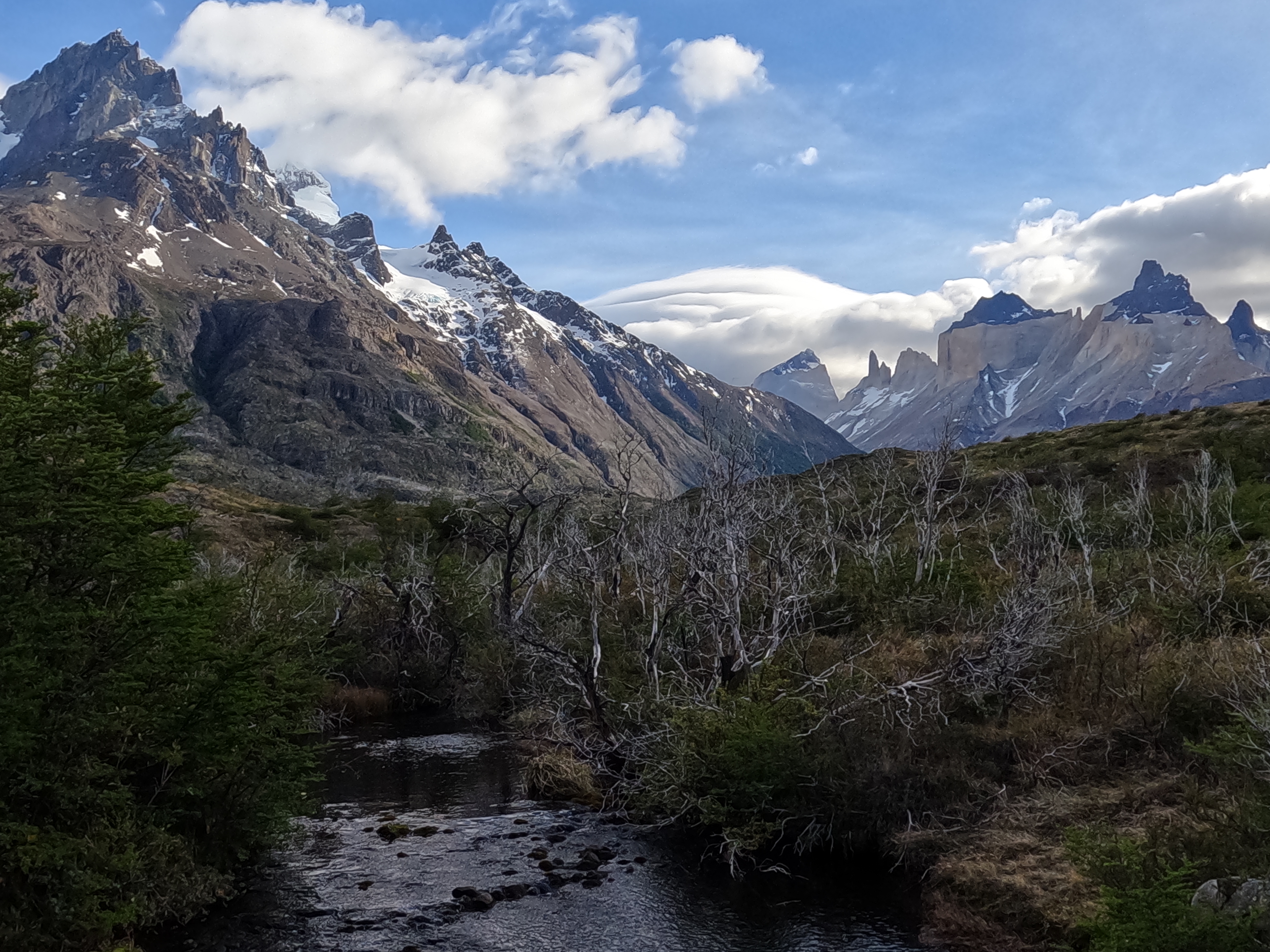
Another view of Cerro Paine Grande and the Cuernos (The horns) from the W Trek hiking route.

In the Valley of Silence, the gigantic granite walls of Cerro Fortaleza and Cerro Escudo (Shield Mountain) stand face to face with the western faces of the Torres del Paine. Ascencio Valley is the normal route to reach the Torres del Paine lookout, which is located at the bank of a milky green tarn. The highest mountain of the group is Paine Grande, whose height was measured in 2011 using GPS and found to be 2,884 m (9,462 ft).

The Southern Patagonian Ice Field mantles a great portion of the park. Glaciers include the Dickson, the Grey, and the Tyndall.

Among the lakes are the Dickson Lake, Nordenskjöld Lake, Lake Pehoé, Grey Lake, Sarmiento Lake, and Del Toro Lake. Only a portion of the latter is within the borders of the park. All are vividly colored, most due to rock flour suspended in their waters. The main river flowing through the park is Paine River. Most of the rivers and lakes of the park drain into Última Esperanza Sound via Serrano River.

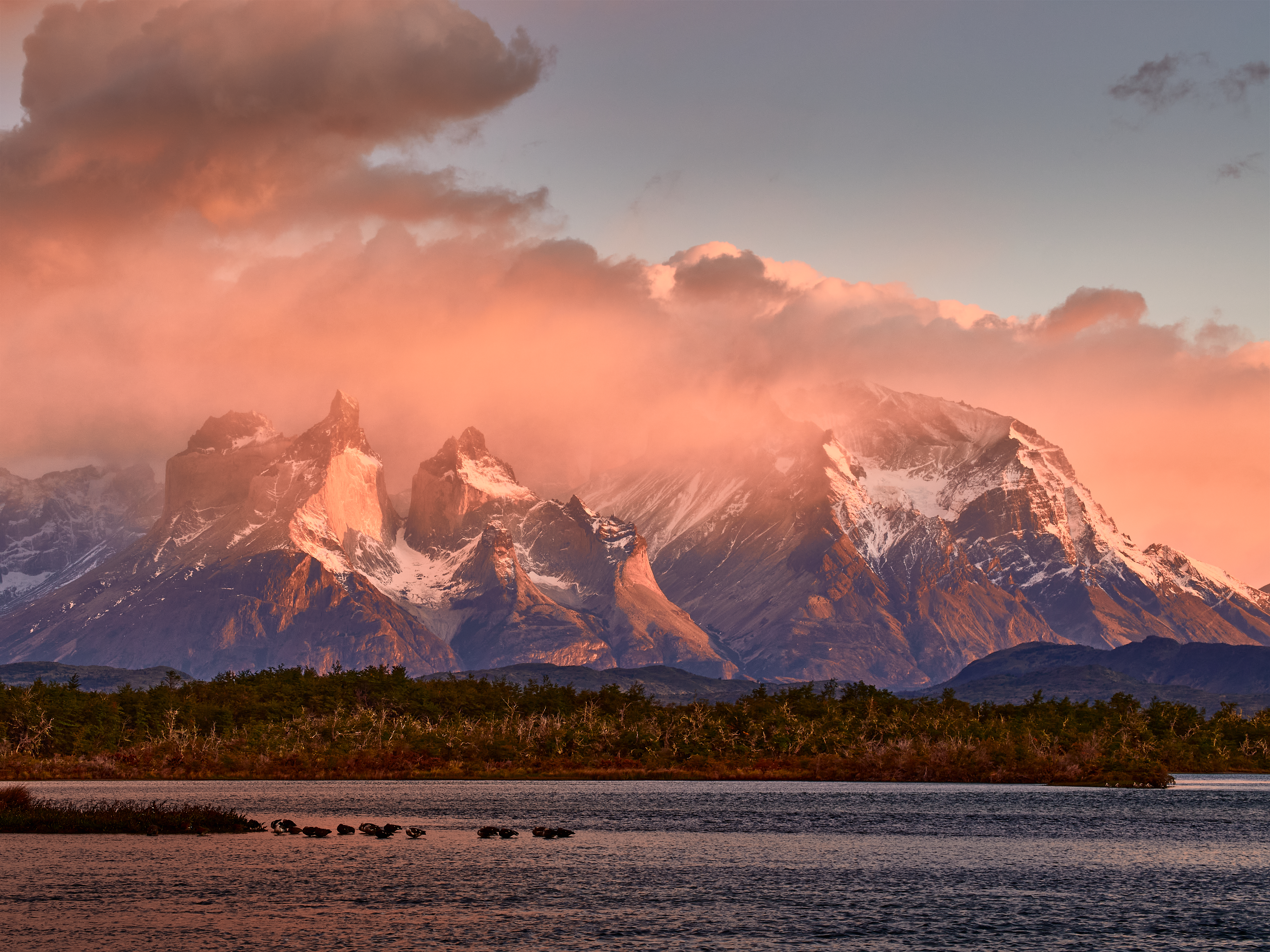
Cuernos del Paine from lake Pehoé

=== Geology ===
Much of the geology of the Paine Massif area consists of Cretaceous sedimentary rocks that have been intruded by a Miocene-aged laccolith. Orogenic and erosional processes have shaped the present-day topography, and glacial erosion is mainly responsible for the sculpturing of the massif in the last tens of thousands of years. A good example of the latter is the Cuernos del Paine, whose central bands of exposed granite contrast strongly with the dark aspect of their tops, which are remnants of a heavily eroded sedimentary stratum. In the case of Las Torres, what once was their overlying sedimentary rock layer has been completely eroded, leaving behind the more resistant granite.

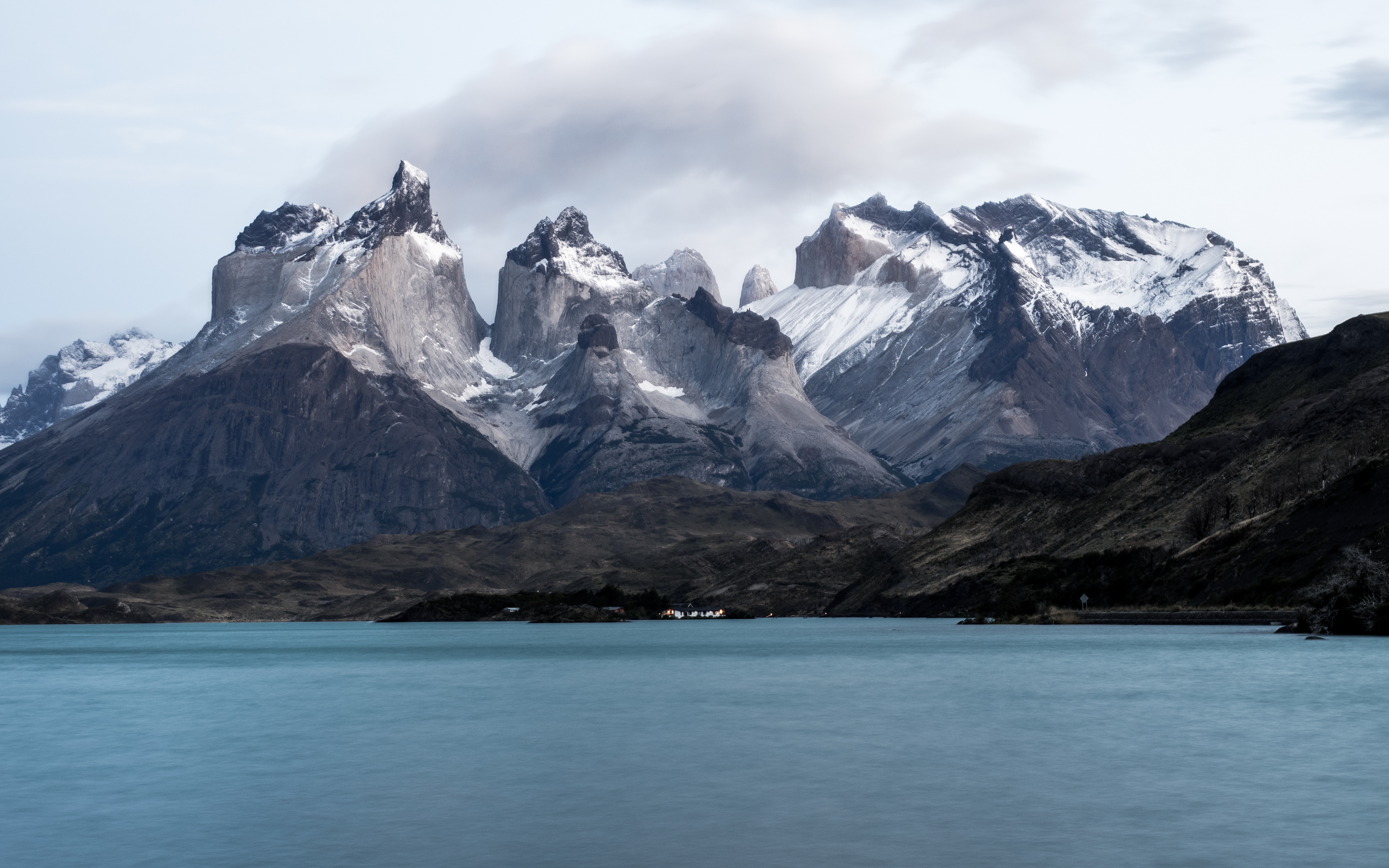
Looking at the Cuernos del Paine and Monte Almirante Nieto from the Lago del Toro in the morning

In June 2014, scientists uncovered fossils of at least 46 ancient specimens of nearly complete skeletons of dolphin-like creatures called Ichthyosaurs which lived between 245 and 90 million years ago. The finding came after melting glaciers revealed new rock faces beneath.

During the last glacial period glacier extent in the area peaked about 48,000 years ago, much earlier than for the more northern locations of Chiloé and Llanquihue. During the late Pleistocene and early Holocene a series of proglacial lakes existed in the Torres del Paine area. The last of these lakes, the Great Tehuelche Paleolake, covered what is now Sarmiento and Del Toro lakes plus a large area to east making Cazador Range a peninsula. The Great Tehuelche Paleolake vanished after being drained about 7,113 years before present. Ancient lake terraces marks the level attained by these lakes albeit great uncertainty exists regarding their evolution.

==== IUGS geological heritage site ====
In respect of it being 'a world class site for the study of structurally controlled emplacement and construction of shallow bimodal laccoliths', the International Union of Geological Sciences (IUGS) included 'The Miocene Torres del Paine intrusive complex' in its assemblage of 100 'geological heritage sites' around the world in a listing published in October 2022. The organisation defines an IUGS Geological Heritage Site as 'a key place with geological elements and/or processes of international scientific relevance, used as a reference, and/or with a substantial contribution to the development of geological sciences through history.'

== Biology ==
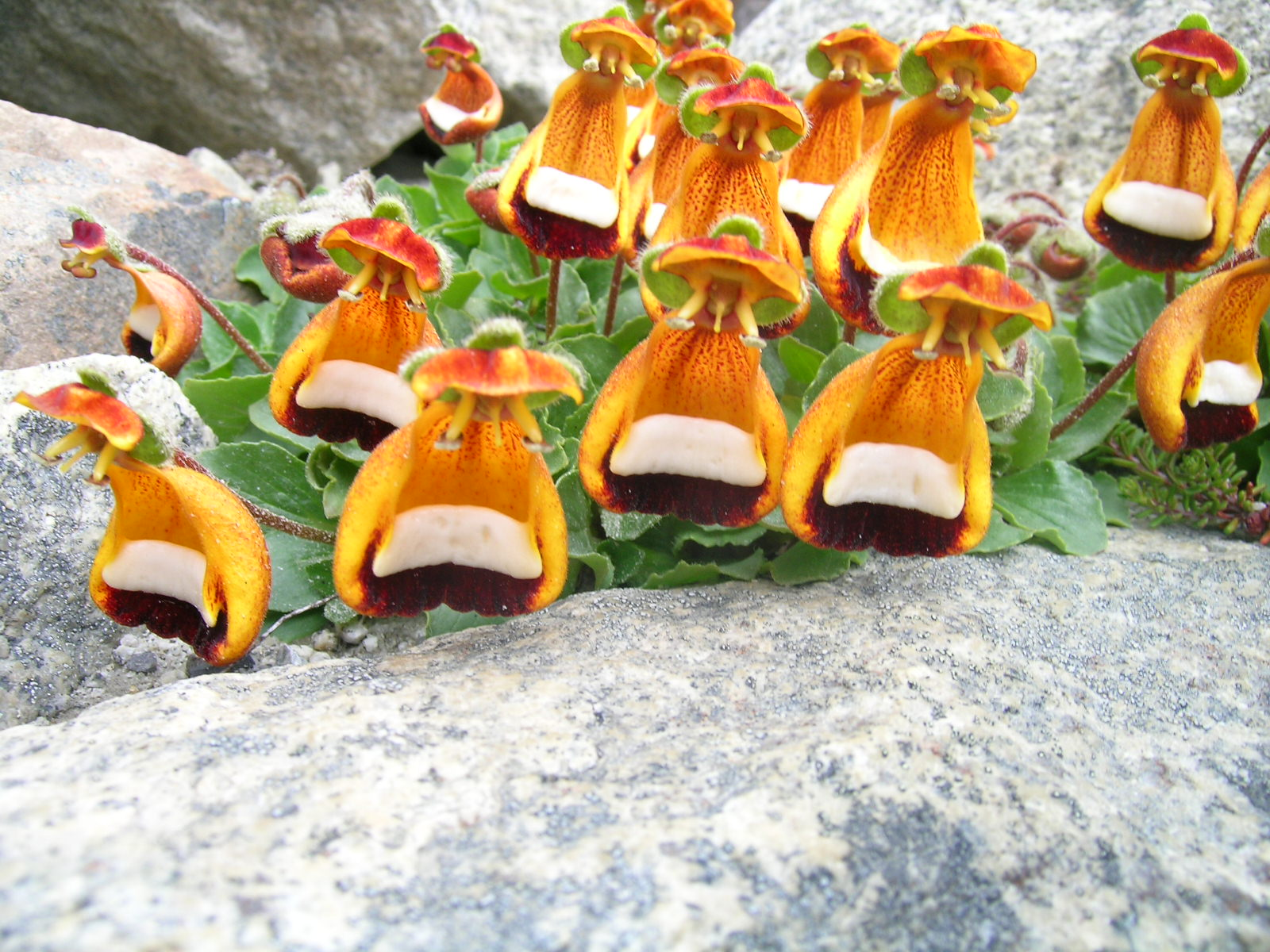
Calceolaria uniflora

=== Flora ===
The last study of significant scope concerning the flora of the park was conducted by Pisano in 1974. This study examined four biotic zones that made up the territory of the park, determined by their vegetational type.

Torres del Paine National Park is adorned with beautiful vegetation, including the evergreen Embothrium coccineum, which produces vivid red flowers grouped in corymbs, and Calceolaria uniflora, of striking shape and colors. The park has 7 documented species of Orchidaceae, including Chloraea magellanica. In the park, 85 non-native plant species have been recorded, of which 75 are of European origin and 31 are considered to be invasive.

The park contains four vegetation zones: Patagonian steppe, Pre-Andean shrubland, Magellanic subpolar forests and Andean Desert. The vegetation of the Patagonian steppe is dominated by Fescue species (mainly Festuca gracillima), which are resistant to harsh winds and weather conditions that are typical of the Patagonian region. Some of the dominant plant species of the Pre-Andean shrubland are Mulinum spinosum (a cushion plant) and Escallonia rubra, which are frequently associated with other species, including Anathrophyllun desideratum and Berberis buxifolia. The Magellanic deciduous forest is home to various species of trees such as the Nothofagus pumilio and Nothofagus antarctica. Above the tree line in the Andean Desert, Escallonia rubra, Empetrum rubrum, and Senecio skottsbergii take the place of Nothofagus pumilio trees.

A study on the beech trees and forest regeneration patterns in the park was published in 1992.

=== Fauna ===
Guanacos are one of the most common mammals found in the park. Other mammals include foxes and pumas. It is also home to the endangered Chilean Huemul. The puma's predation on guanacos in the park has been studied.

The park contains breeding populations of 15 bird of prey species, and two others are likely reproducing here. Among them are Andean condor, black-chested buzzard-eagle, rufous-tailed hawk, cinereous harrier, chimango caracara, magellanic horned owl, austral pygmy-owl, to name but a few. Other birds occurring in the park include the Chilean flamingo, Darwin's rhea, coscoroba swan, black-necked swan, Magellanic woodpecker, Magellan goose, and black-faced ibis.

Fauna in Torres del Paine National Park

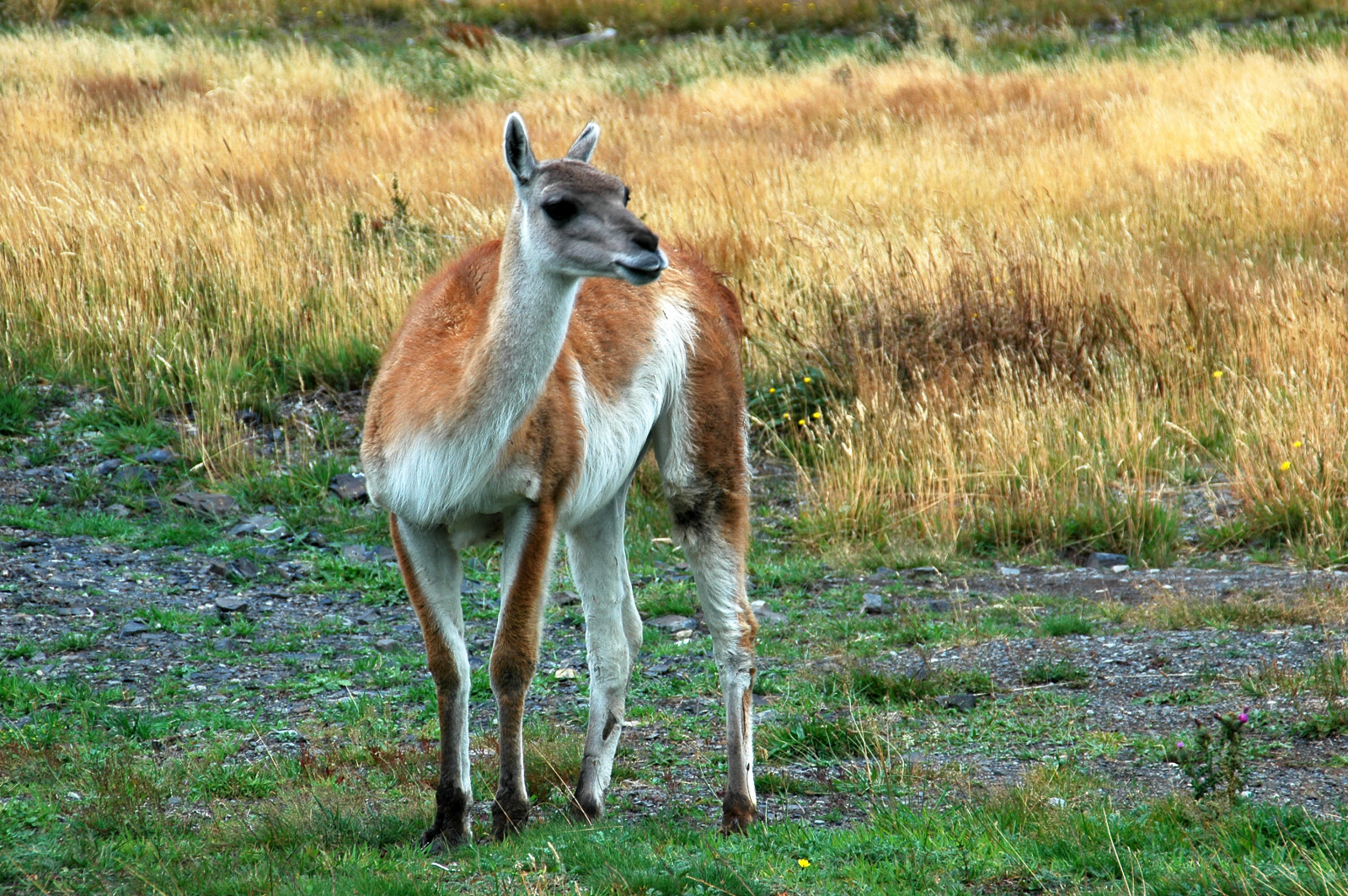
Guanaco

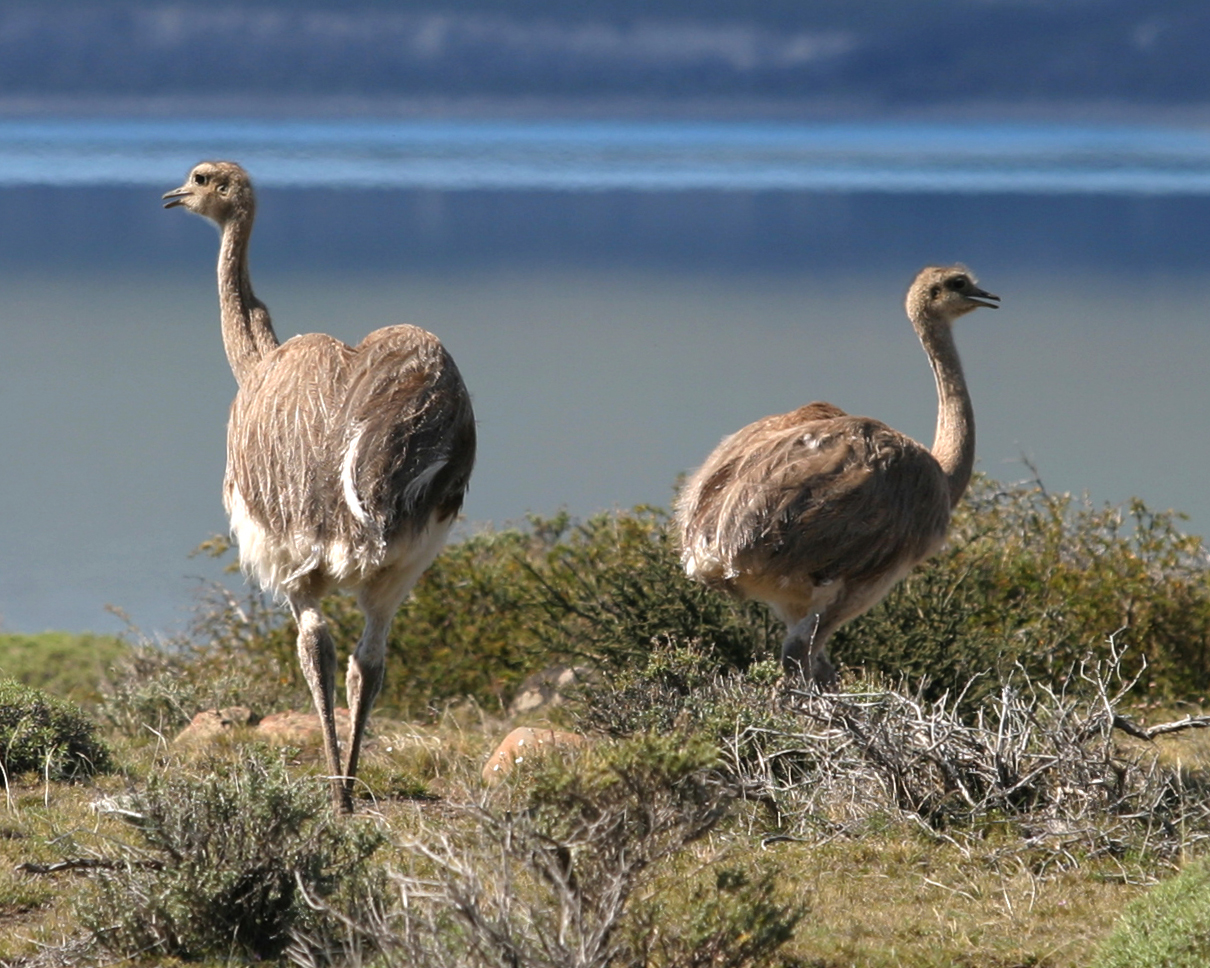
Rheas

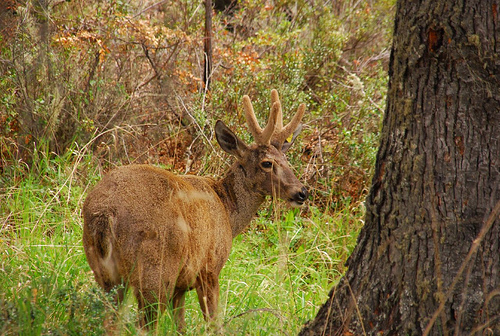
South Andean deer

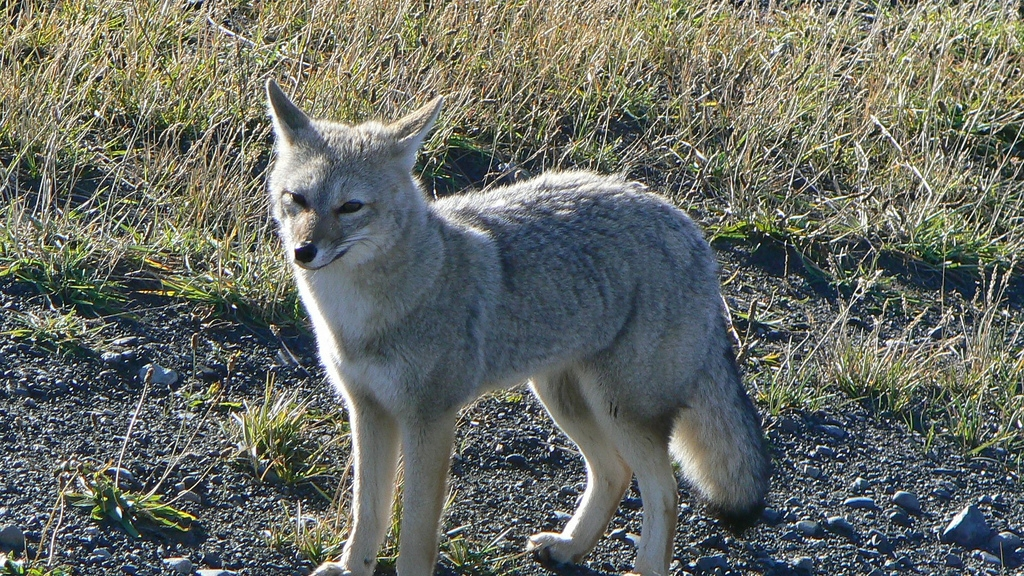
South American gray fox

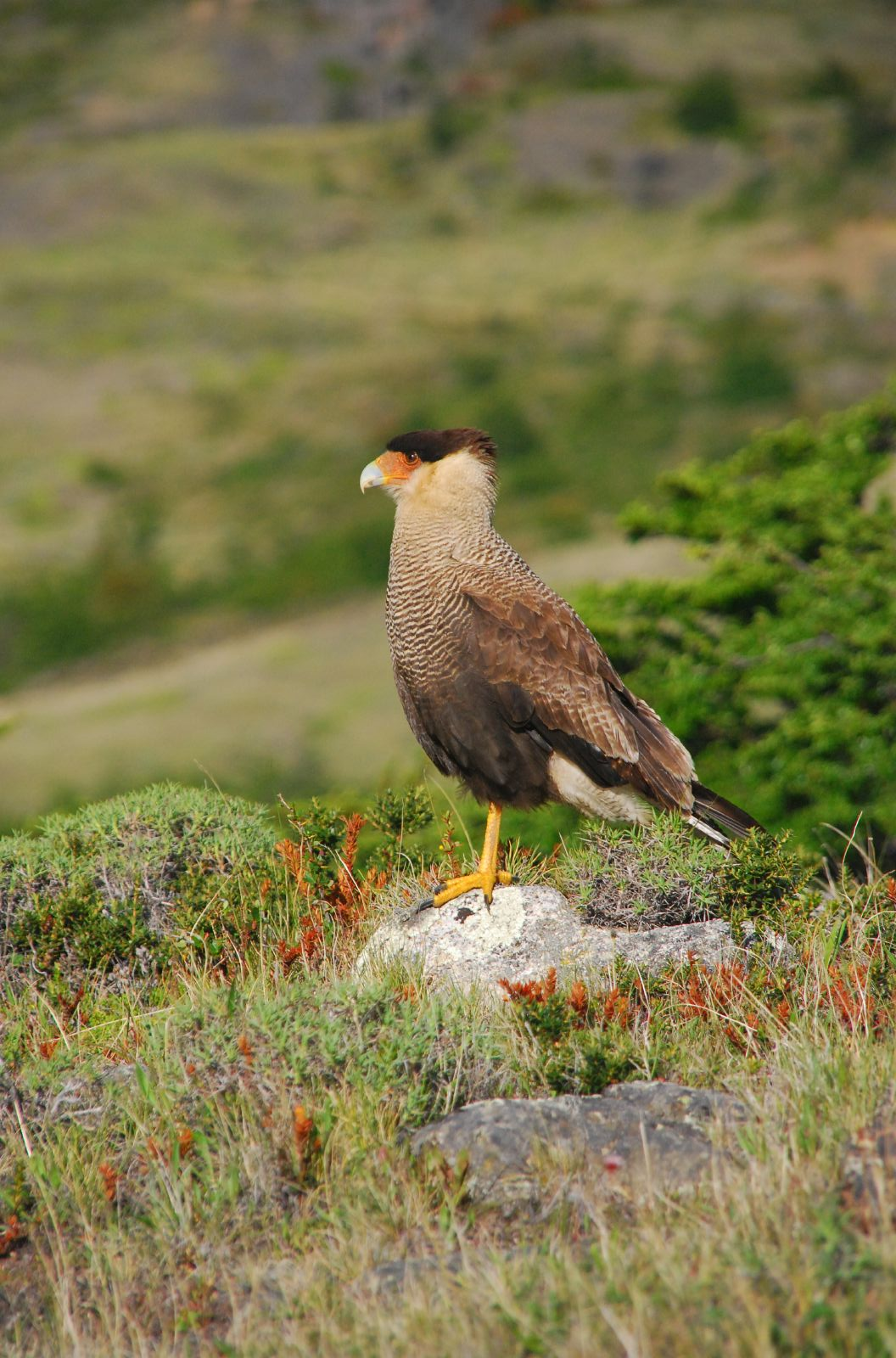
Crested caracara

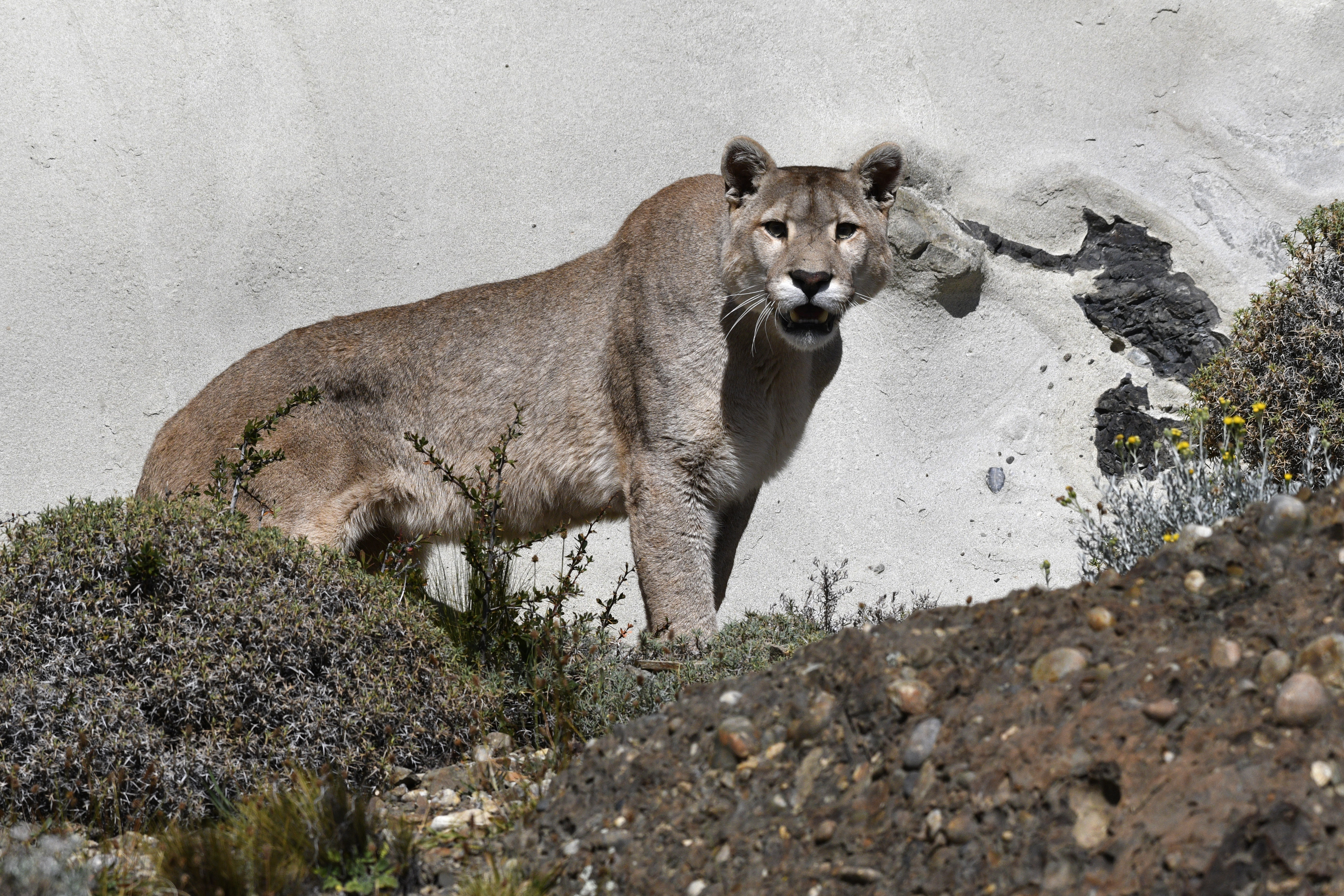
Puma

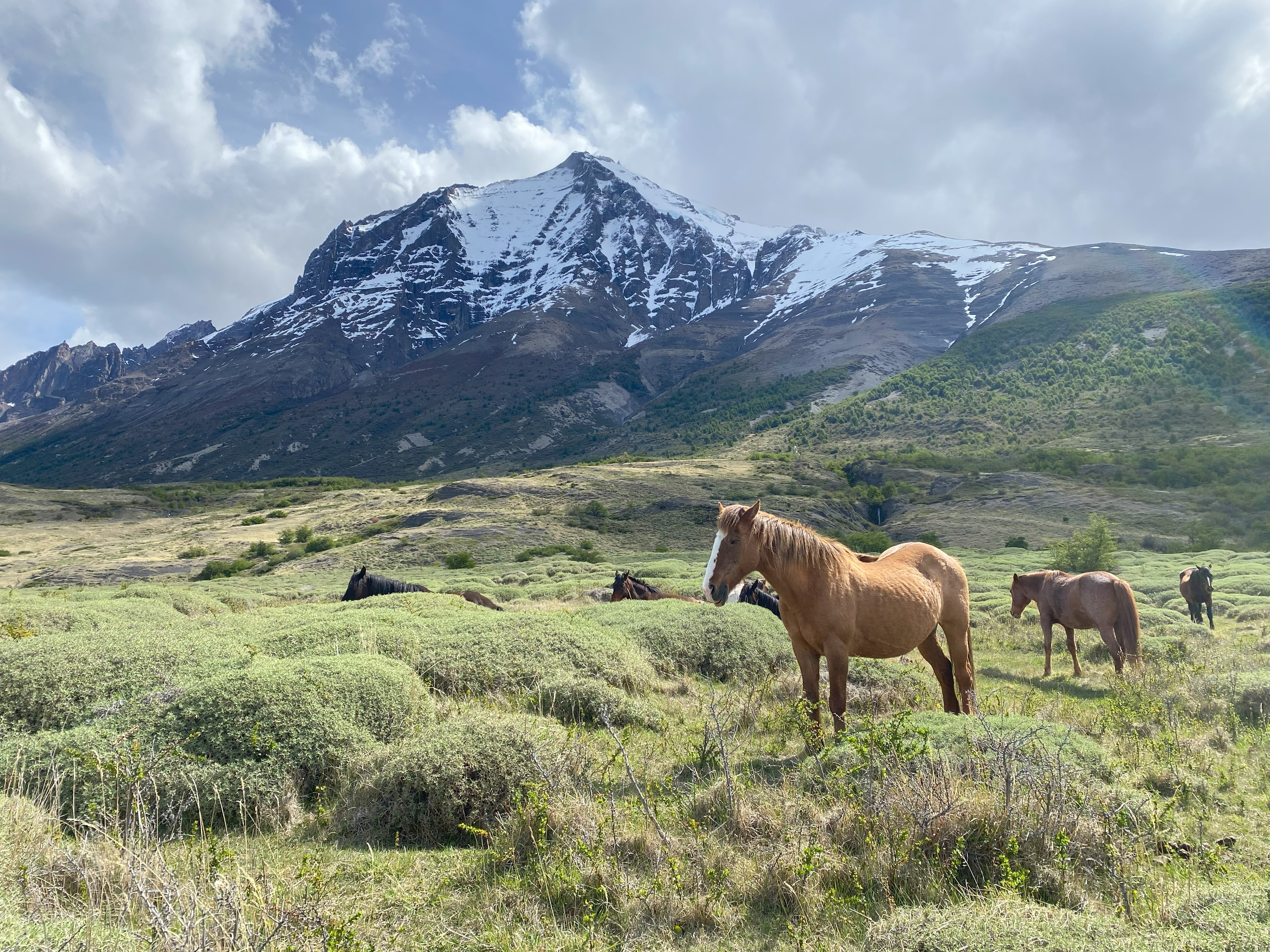
Feral horses

== Tourism ==
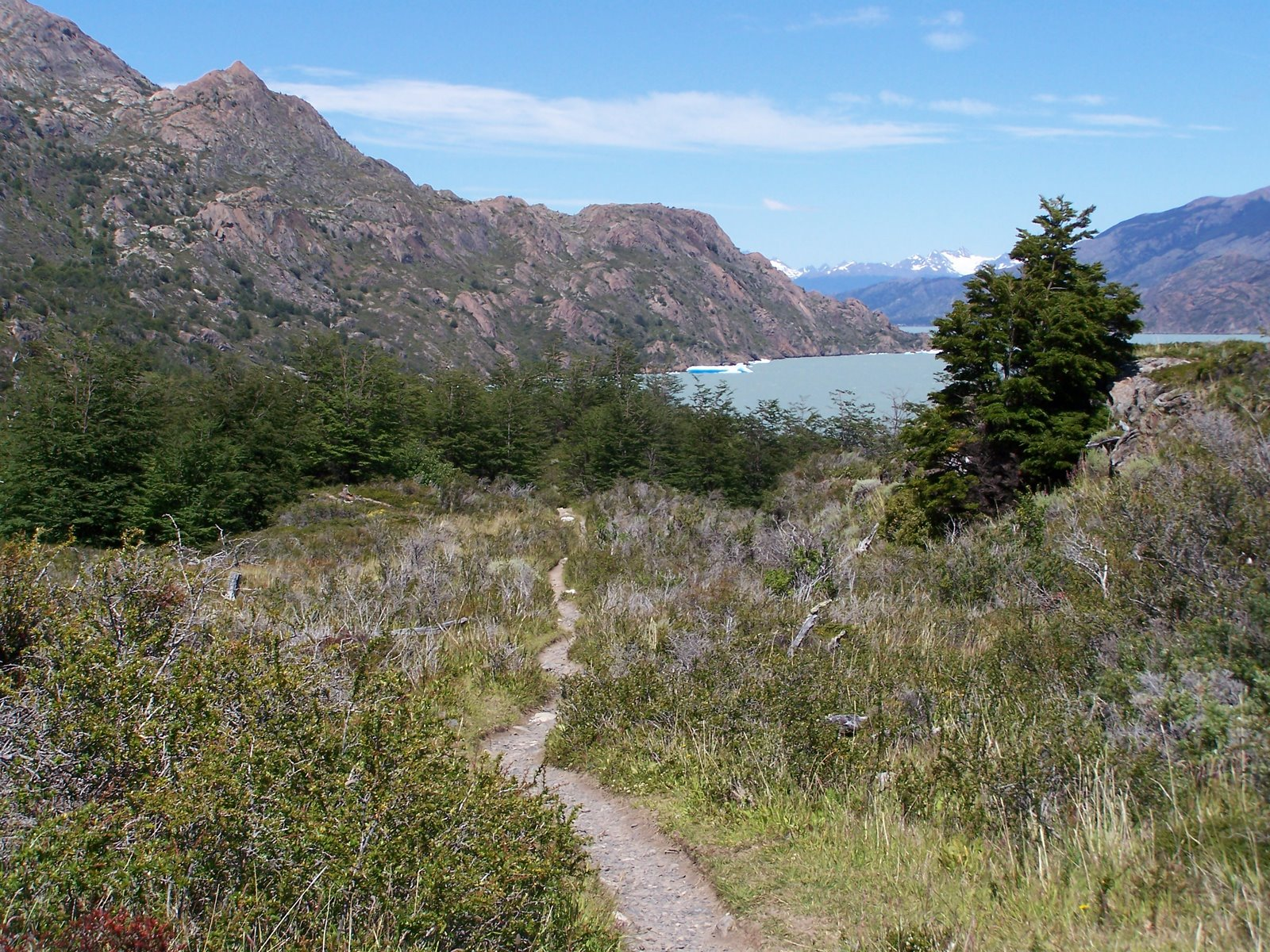
Hiking trail in Torres del Paine

The national park is a popular hiking destination in Chile and has over 252,000 visitors per year. There are clearly marked paths and many refugios which provide shelter and basic services. There are also several hotels located in and around the park. Hikers can opt for a day trip to see the towers, French Valley, or Glacier Grey, or a multi-day trek. Multi-day treks include the popular "W" route, which takes about three to five days and covers 50 miles, and the full circuit or "O" route, which typically takes 7 to 9 days and covers 81 miles.

Cooking with a camping stove is not permitted except in refugio locations. Camping is only allowed at specified campsites, and wood fires are prohibited throughout the park. Since October 2016, it has been mandatory to book campsites or refugios before entering the park. Hikers are not allowed to stray from the paths in the national park, and a certified guide is required to access some parts of the park. The visitor impact on the park has been scientifically measured.

Visiting the park is recommended between September and April, during the southern spring, summer, and early autumn. During summer, daylight hours are long, given the southern latitude. Outside of this time frame, the weather becomes extreme. During the southern winter, daylight dwindles to only 8 hours a day.

Attractions include the Cuernos (horns) - a group of 2000m high mountains, and the view of Pingo Lake from de Grey Glacier.

The park has been elected as the 8th Wonder of the World by TripAdvisor.

== Access routes ==
The park can be reached by Chile Route 9, which is paved and connects Punta Arenas and Puerto Natales and continues as an asphalt road for 100 km and then becomes a gravel road. In the winter, using tire chains is recommended due to unstable climatic conditions. The park can also be reached through maritime and aerial routes. Some buses leave from Puerto Natales.

== See also ==
- Laguna San Rafael National Park
- Los Glaciares National Park
- Salto Grande (waterfall)
