= Great Tehuelche Paleolake =

The Paleolake Tehuelche is the name for several former lakes that existed in the area of Torres del Paine in southern Patagonia. These were proglacial lakes that existed next to the Patagonian Ice Sheet during the Late Pleistocene and Early Holocene. Some of the evidence of the lakes stem from lake terraces observable at present but there is some uncertainty on which terraces are associated to which lake or lake stage.

About 38,000 years BP an early Paleolake Tehuelche existed and drained eastward through Turbio River. The surface of this lake was 250 to 280 m a.s.l.

A particular lake named Great Tehuelche Paleolake covered what is now Sarmiento and Del Toro lakes plus a large area to east making Cazador Range a peninsula until about 7,113 years BP when the lake drained and ceased to exist.
