= Grey River (Chile) =

Location
- Country: Chile

Physical characteristics
- Source
  - location: Grey Lake
- Mouth
  - location: Serrano River
- Length: 20 km (12 mi)

Grey River is a river located in the Magallanes Region of Chile. The river originates as the outflow of Grey Lake and flows for 20 km before it merges with the Serrano River.

Grey River, in the Torres del Paine National Park

== See also ==
- Salto Grande
