= Tyndall Glacier (Chile) =

Glacier in Chile

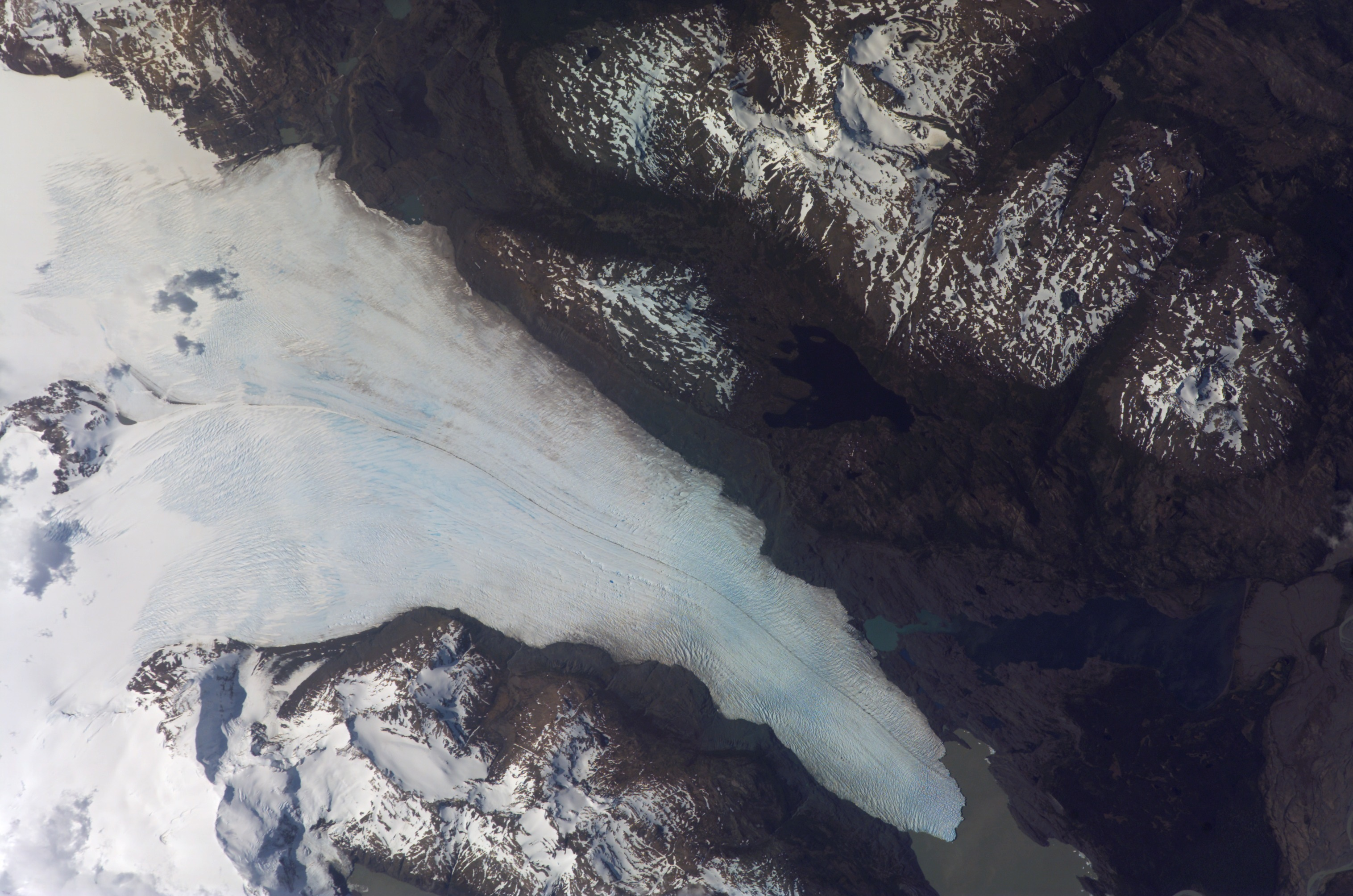
- As photographed from the International Space Station.
- Interactive map of Tyndall Glacier
- Location: Chile
- Coordinates: 51°15′S 73°17′W
- Area: 331 km^{2} (128 sq mi)
- Length: 32 km (20 mi)
- Terminus: Glacial lake
- Status: retreating

Tyndall Glacier or Geike Glacier is one of the largest glaciers in the Southern Patagonian Ice Field. It is located in the Torres del Paine National Park, Chile. The glacier has its main calving front in Geikie Lake and like its neighbor, Grey Glacier, it has been significantly retreating for the last years. The glacier is named after the Irish glaciologist John Tyndall.
