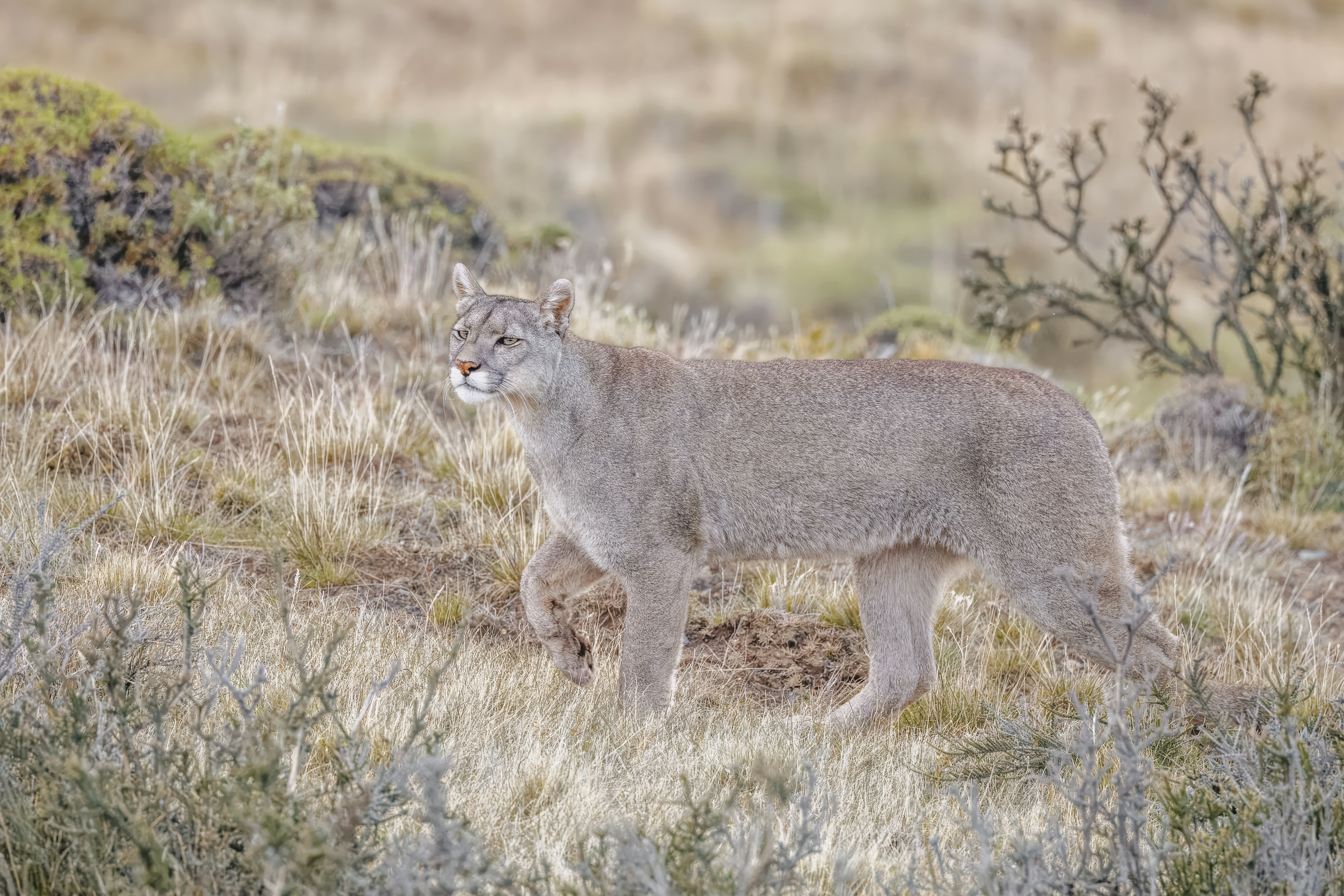
- Female cougar in Torres del Paine, Chile

Conservation status
- Near Threatened (IUCN 3.1) (Brazilian, Argentinian, Colombian and Peruvian population)

- Data Deficient (IUCN 3.1) (Chilean population)

Scientific classification
- Kingdom: Animalia
- Phylum: Chordata
- Class: Mammalia
- Order: Carnivora
- Family: Felidae
- Genus: Puma
- Species: P. concolor
- Subspecies: P. c. concolor

Trinomial name
- Puma concolor concolor (Linnaeus, 1771)

Synonyms
- P. c. anthonyi (Nelson and Goldman, 1931); P. c. acrocodia (Goldman, 1943); P. c. araucanus (Osgood, 1943); P. c. bangsi (Merriam, 1901); P. c. borbensis (Nelson and Goldman, 1933); P. c. cabrerae (Pocock, 1940); P. c. capricornensis (Goldman, 1946); P. c. greeni (Nelson and Goldman, 1931); P. c. hudsonii (Marcelli, 1922; Cabrera, 1958); P. c. incarum (Nelson and Goldman, 1929); P. c. nigra (Jardine, 1834); P. c. osgoodi (Nelson and Goldman, 1929); P. c. patagonica (Merriam, 1901); P. c. pearsoni (Thomas, 1901; Trouessart, 1904); P. c. puma (Marcelli, 1922; Molina, 1782; Trouessart, 1904); P. c. soasoaranna (Lesson, 1842); P. c. sussuarana; P. c. soderstromii (Lönnberg, 1913); P. c. suçuaçuara (Liais, 1872); P. c. wavula (Lesson, 1842)

= South American cougar =

Subspecies of carnivore

The South American cougar (Puma concolor concolor), also known as the Andean mountain lion or puma, is a cougar subspecies occurring in northern and western South America, from Colombia and Venezuela to Peru, Bolivia, Argentina and Chile. It is the nominate subspecies.

== Taxonomy ==
Felis concolor was proposed by Carl Linnaeus in 1771 for the cougar type specimen, which originated in French Guiana. Since then, several cougar specimens from South America were described:

- Puma concolor puma proposed by Juan Ignacio Molina in 1782 was a specimen from Chile.
- Puma concolor cabrerae proposed by Reginald Innes Pocock in 1940 was a specimen collected in La Rioja Province, Argentina.
- Puma concolor capricornensis proposed by Edward Alphonso Goldman in 1946 was a specimen from Brazil.

As of 2017, these specimens are considered synonyms of P. c. concolor, the cougar subspecies occurring in South America.

== Behavior and ecology ==
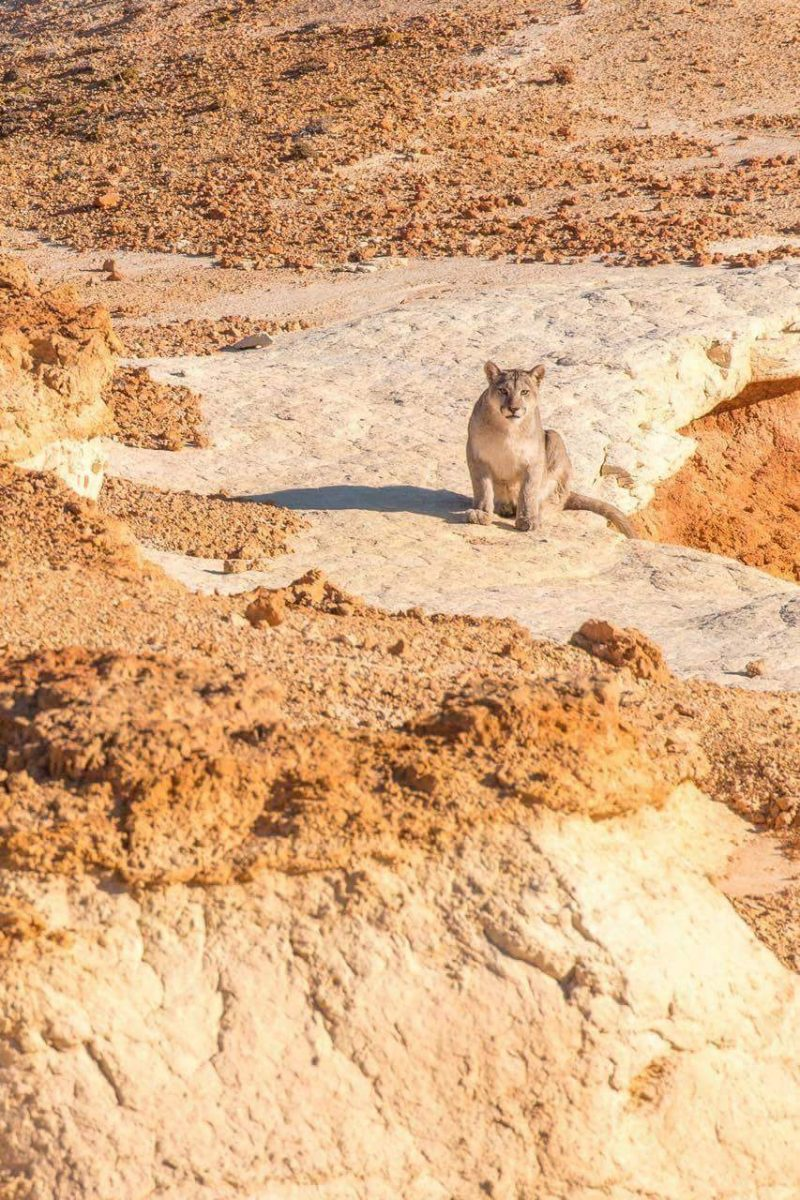
in the Sierras Blancas, Argentina

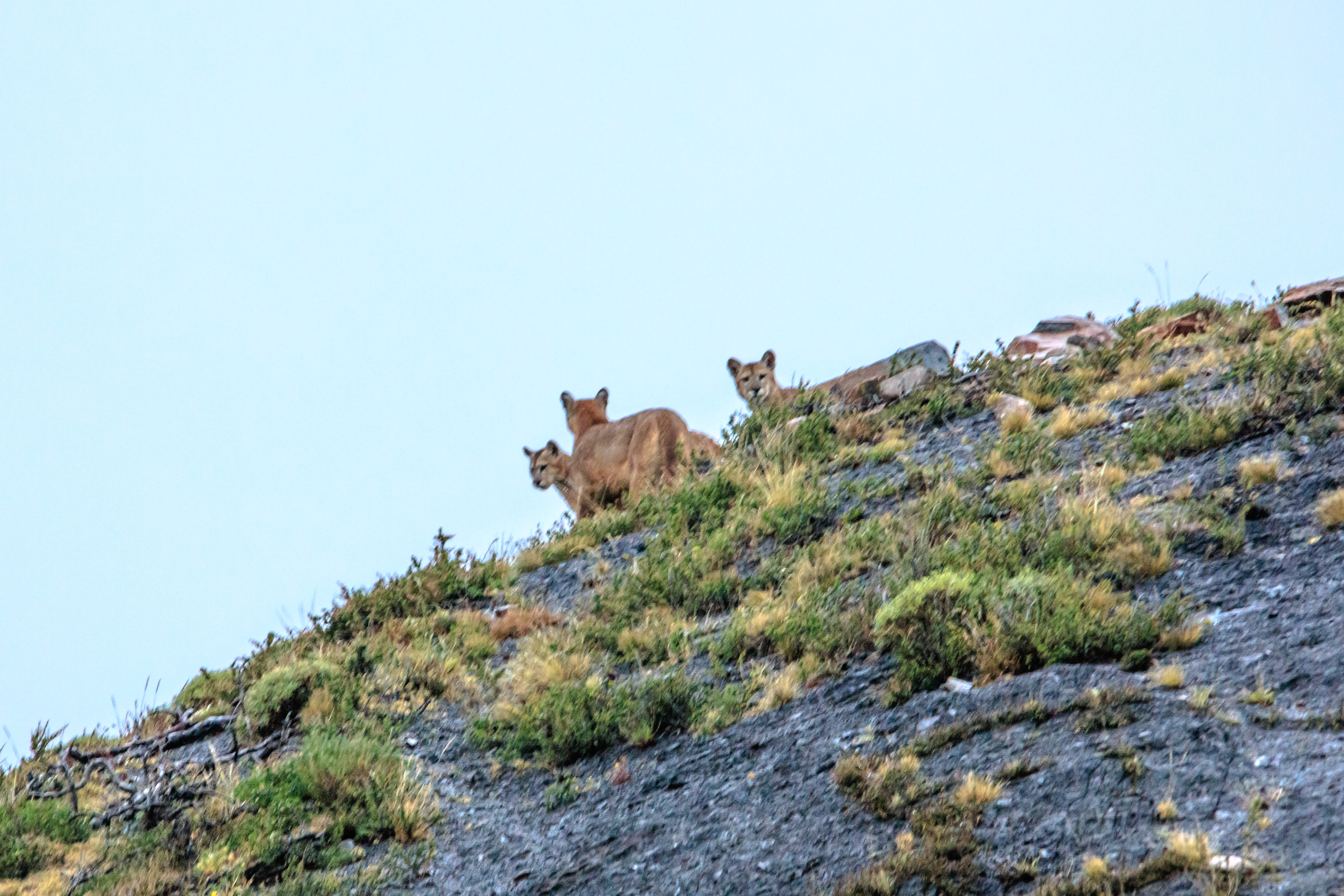
A family with two cubs near the Salto Grande Waterfall on Lago Pehoé, in Torres del Paine National Park, the Magallenean-Patagonian part of Chile

The South American puma is a largely solitary and secretive cat. A single puma's home range may span hundreds of square kilometres which the cat patrols, traversing significant distances daily. A large range potentially means more cached or hoarded kills (stored prey carcasses) for later consumption, as well as different nests, dens or bedding sites; vast territories enable the cats to scent-mark their territory and decipher the pheromones of other pumas, and animals, that have passed through.

Other than mothers with their young (or adolescent siblings newly on their own) and male-female encounters during the mating season, the South American puma is seldom seen in pairs or groups. Mothers care for and wean their cubs for up to a year before she abandons them or chases them off, in time for the next potential reproductive cycle. Large, dominant male pumas may threaten or kill young cubs if they are deemed potential competition for resources or future bloodlines.

=== Diet ===
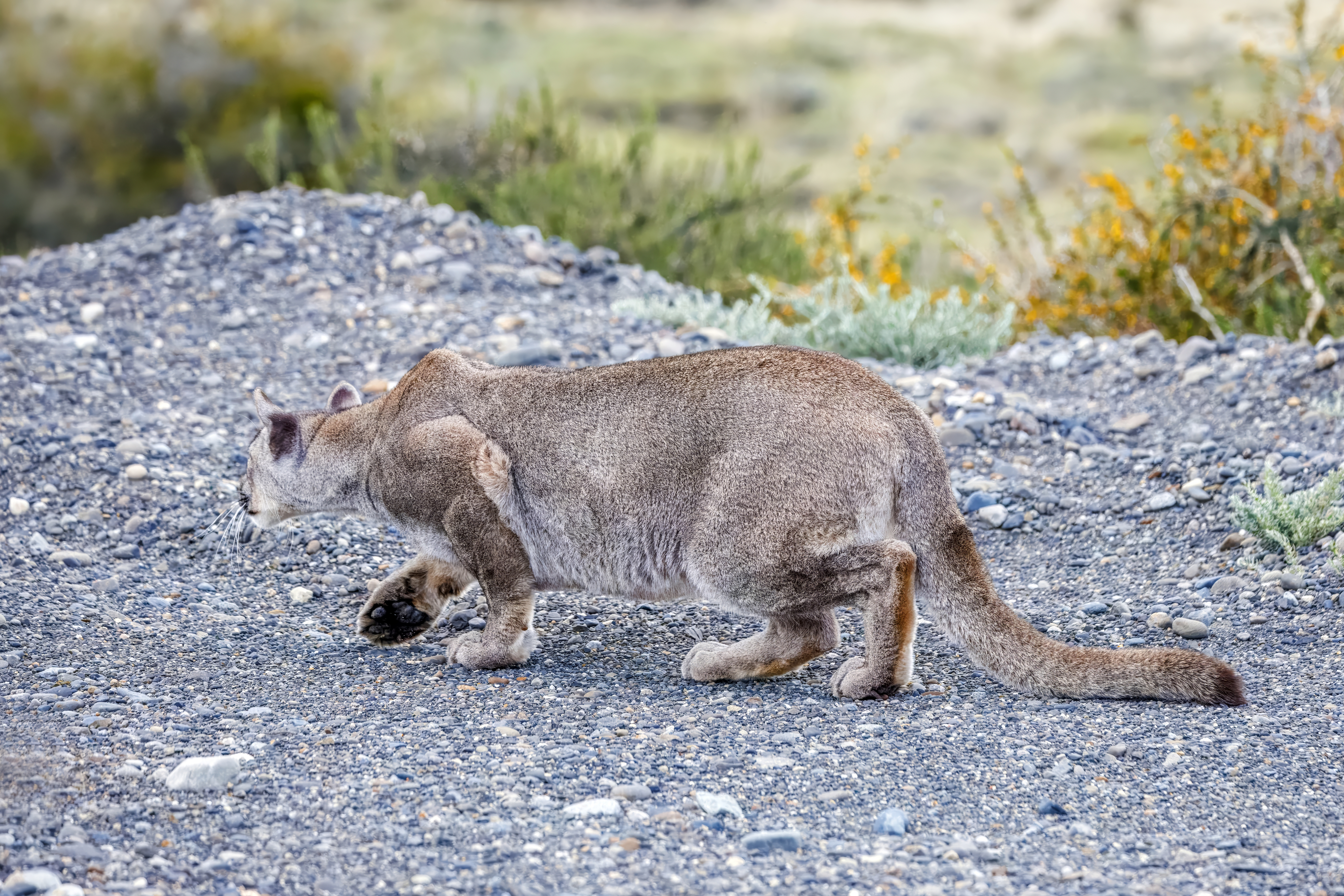
Cougar hunting in Torres del Paine

Depending on its location, the puma hunts a variety of species; in the northern, more tropical regions, prey consists of many species of birds, primates, opossums and rodents (including agouti, capybara, paca, rats, as well as brocket deer, white-tailed deer, taruca, white-lipped and collared peccary, South American tapir, sloths, frogs, lizards and snakes. In the western and northwestern regions of South America, puma sometimes prey on spectacled bear cubs. Further south, the cats prey on guanaco, vicuña, pudu, South Andean deer and pampas deer, Patagonian mara, viscacha, rhea, Andean mountain cat and South American fox, as well as livestock such as sheep, goats, poultry, cattle, llama and alpaca. Certain populations may also hunt and prey on non-native, introduced species, such as red deer in Argentina, blackbuck, or North American beaver. In San Guillermo National Park, the vicuña is the puma's main prey species, and constitutes about 80% of its diet. However, they will abandon kills if not cached quickly, as they will often be harassed by birds of prey, such as Andean condors; the presence of large raptors and other scavenging birds causes pumas to kill and store 50% more prey than North American cougars.

== Cultural significance ==
Like the jaguar, the puma holds historical cultural significance amongst many South American indigenous people. People in the Andes regard the puma as being either a snatcher of souls, or as a helper of people. The cougar's name was used for Incan regions and people. The Chankas, who were enemies of the Incas, had the cougar as their deity.
