= Lake Pehoé =

Lake located in Torres del Paine National Park, Chile

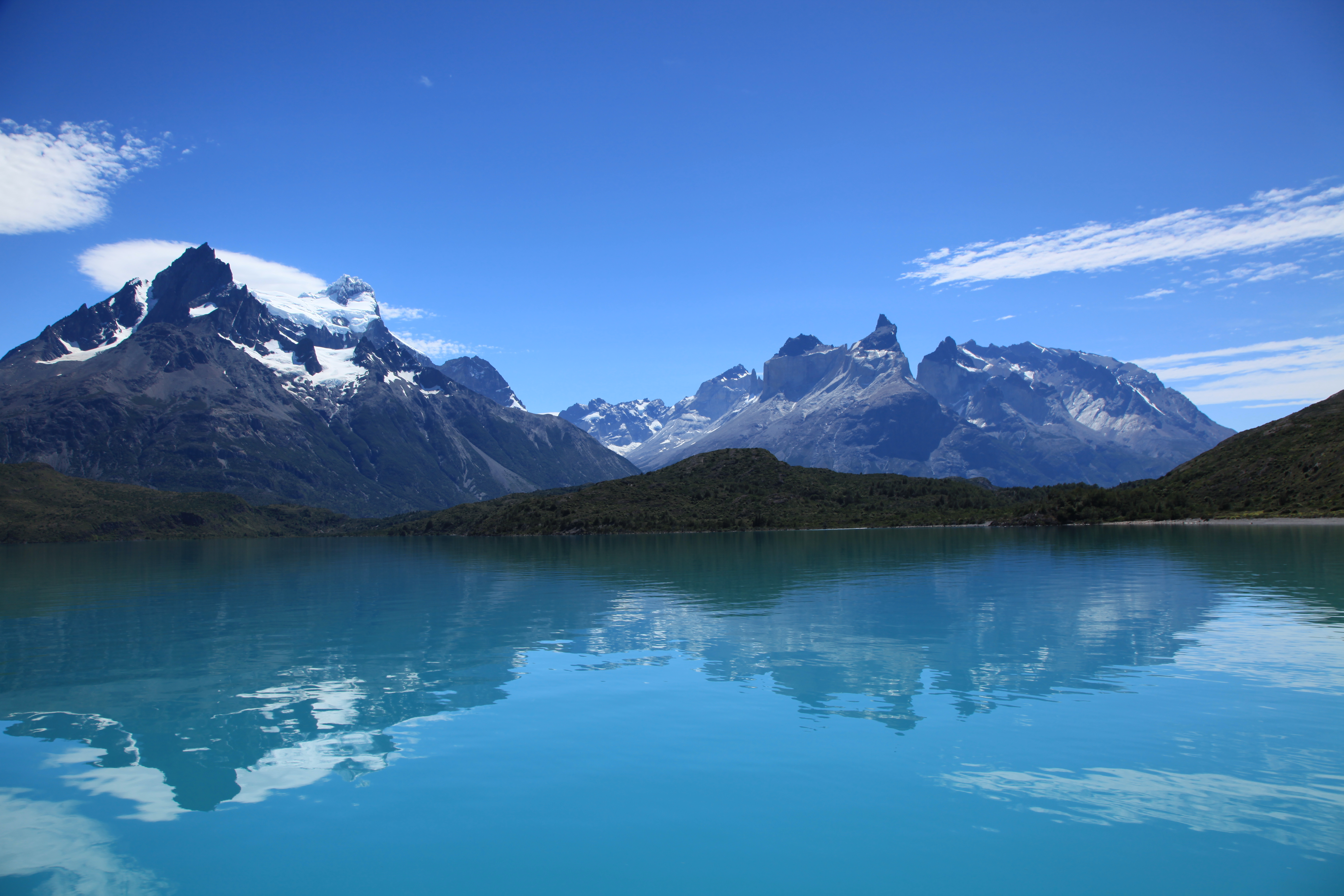
- Cuernos del Paine

- Location within Chile
- Location: Magallanes Region
- Coordinates: 51°06′S 73°04′W
- Primary inflows: Paine River
- Primary outflows: Paine River
- Basin countries: Chile
- Surface area: 22 km^{2} (8.5 sq mi)

Lake Pehoé (Spanish pronunciation: [peoˈe]) is a surface water body located in Torres del Paine National Park, in the Magallanes Region of southern Chile. The lake is fed mainly by Paine River through the Nordenskjöld Lake, but it also receives the water from the outlet of Skottsberg Lake.

The water of Paine River feeding the Pehoé Lake have emerged from the Salto Grande waterfall. In this upper reach of the Pehoe Lake watershed there are numerous flora and fauna, including grazing wild guanaco.

== Gallery ==
Pehoé Lake, in the Torres del Paine National Park

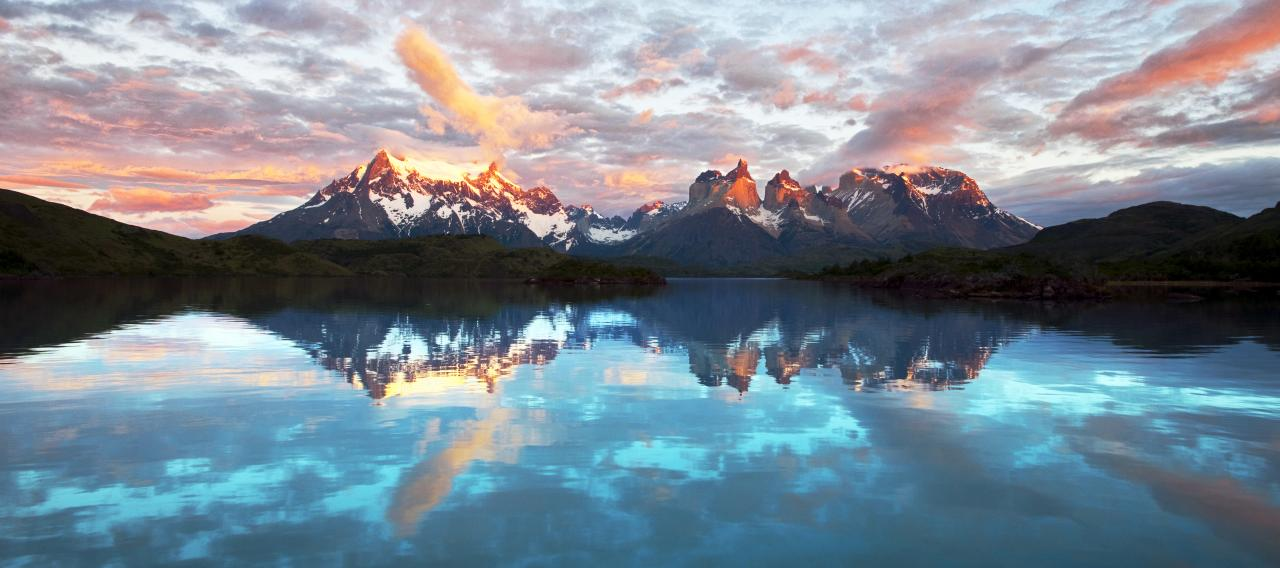
Lake Pehoé sunrise

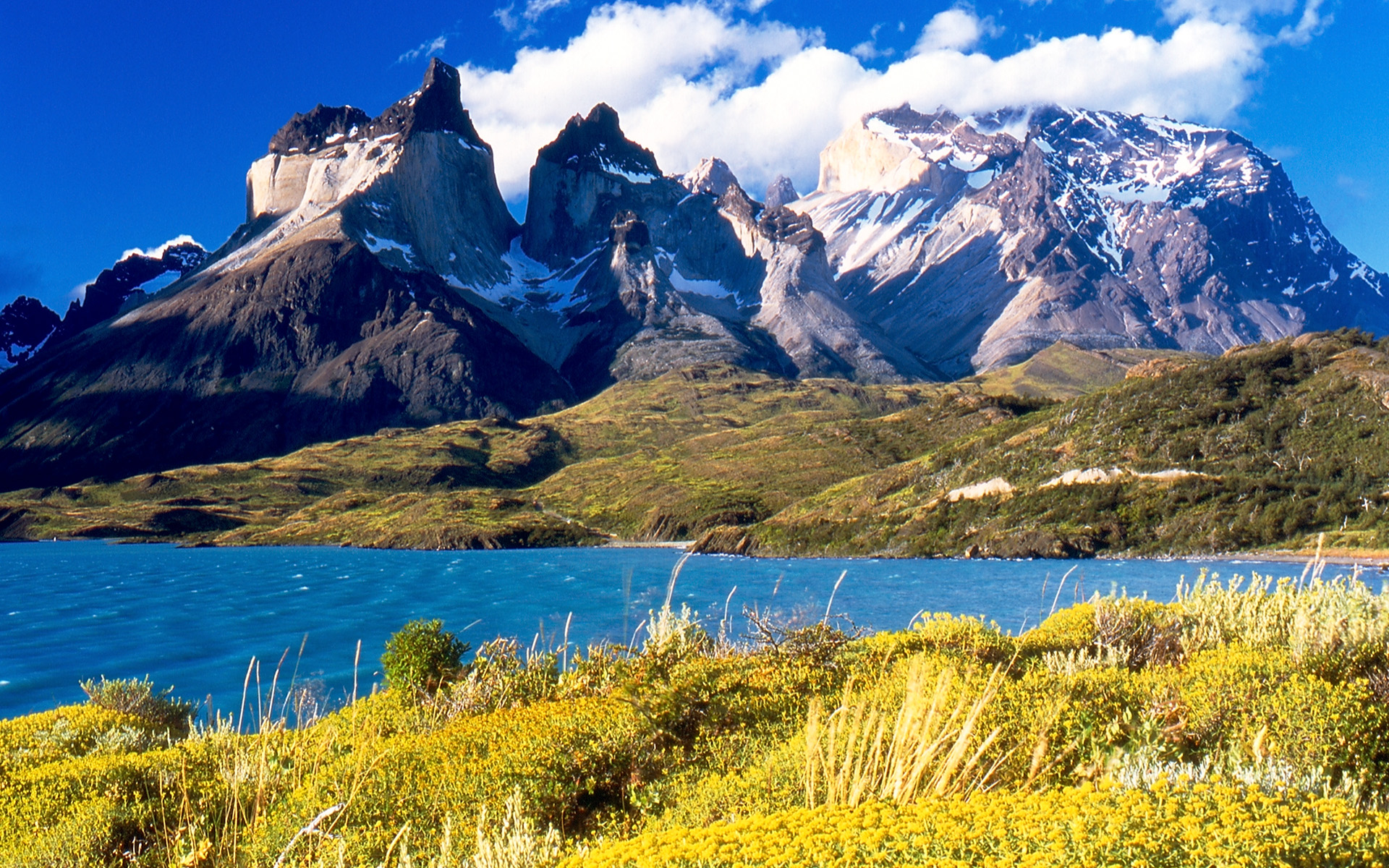
Cuernos del Paine from Lake Pehoé
