= Dickson Lake =

Glacier lake in southern Patagonia

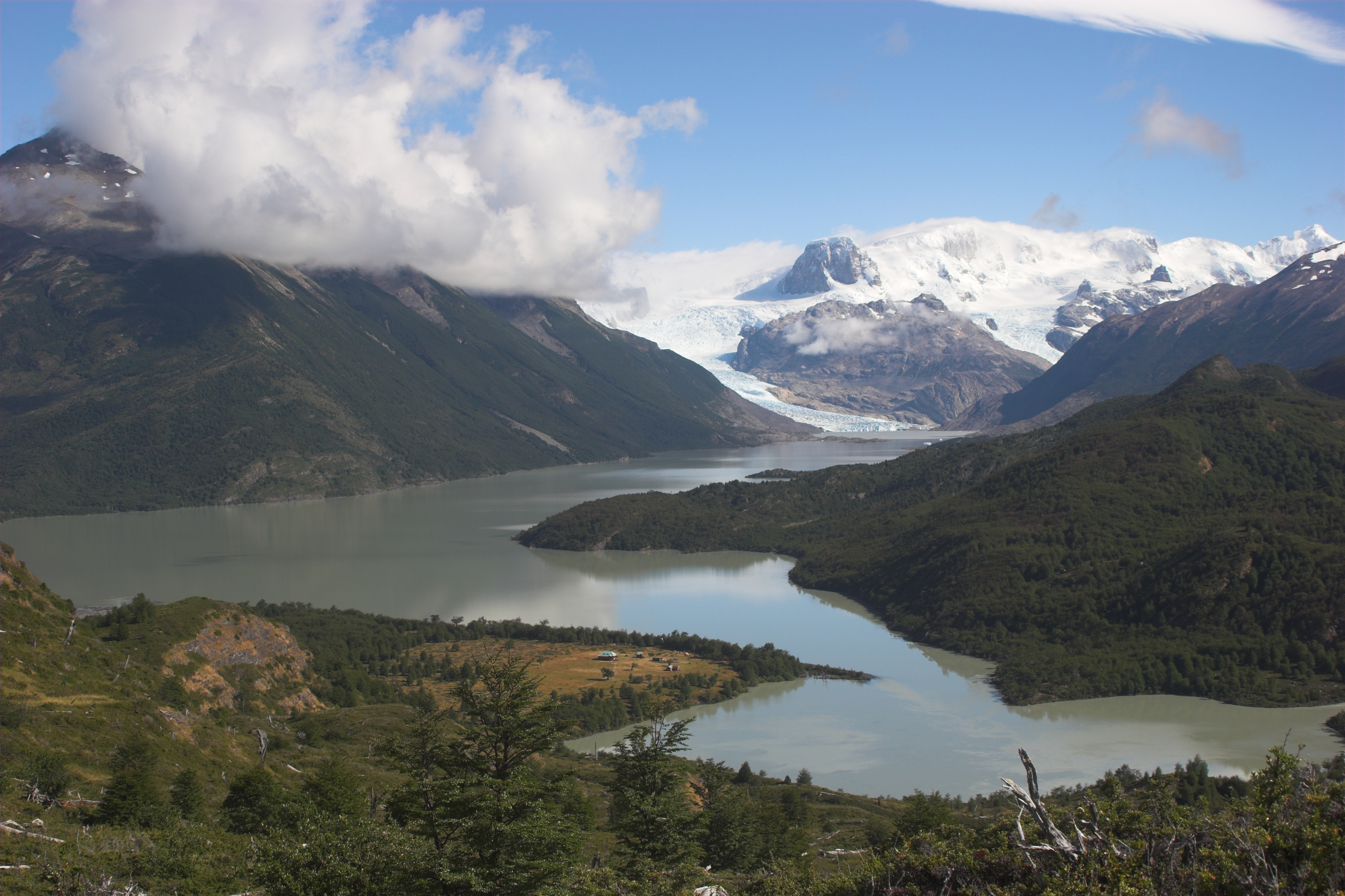
- Glaciar Dickson and Cerro Cubo in the background.

- Location within Argentina
- Location: Santa Cruz Province (ARG); Magallanes Region (CHL)
- Coordinates: 50°50′S 73°07′W
- Primary inflows: Dickson Glacier
- Primary outflows: Paine River
- Basin countries: Argentina and Chile

Dickson Lake is a glacier lake in southern Patagonia located in the Southern Patagonian Ice Field, which since 1998 has been transformed into an international lake as it is crossed by the international boundary between Argentina and Chile due to the retreat of the Dickson glacier. Until that year, Dickson Lake was entirely within Chilean territory, at the northern end of the Torres del Paine National Park in the Magallanes y la Antártica Chilena Region, but it was unified with a lake that began to form in the 1980s by the melting of the Dickson, Cubo (or Cincuentenario) and Frías (or Grande) glaciers. That lake was on the Argentine side when the Agreement was signed to specify the route of the limit from Mount Fitz Roy to the Daudet Hill of 1998, in a sector adjacent to the Los Glaciares National Park, but without being part of it. The lake is fed by the glacier that shares its name and is drained by the Paine River. It receives the waters of Los Perros River, which starts at a proglacial lake that was formed during the retreat of Los Perros Glacier.

Administratively, it is part of the Argentine province of Santa Cruz, while on the Chilean side, it belongs to the Magallanes Region.
