= Serrano River =

River located in the Magallanes Region, Chile

Coordinates: 51.411°S 73.083°W

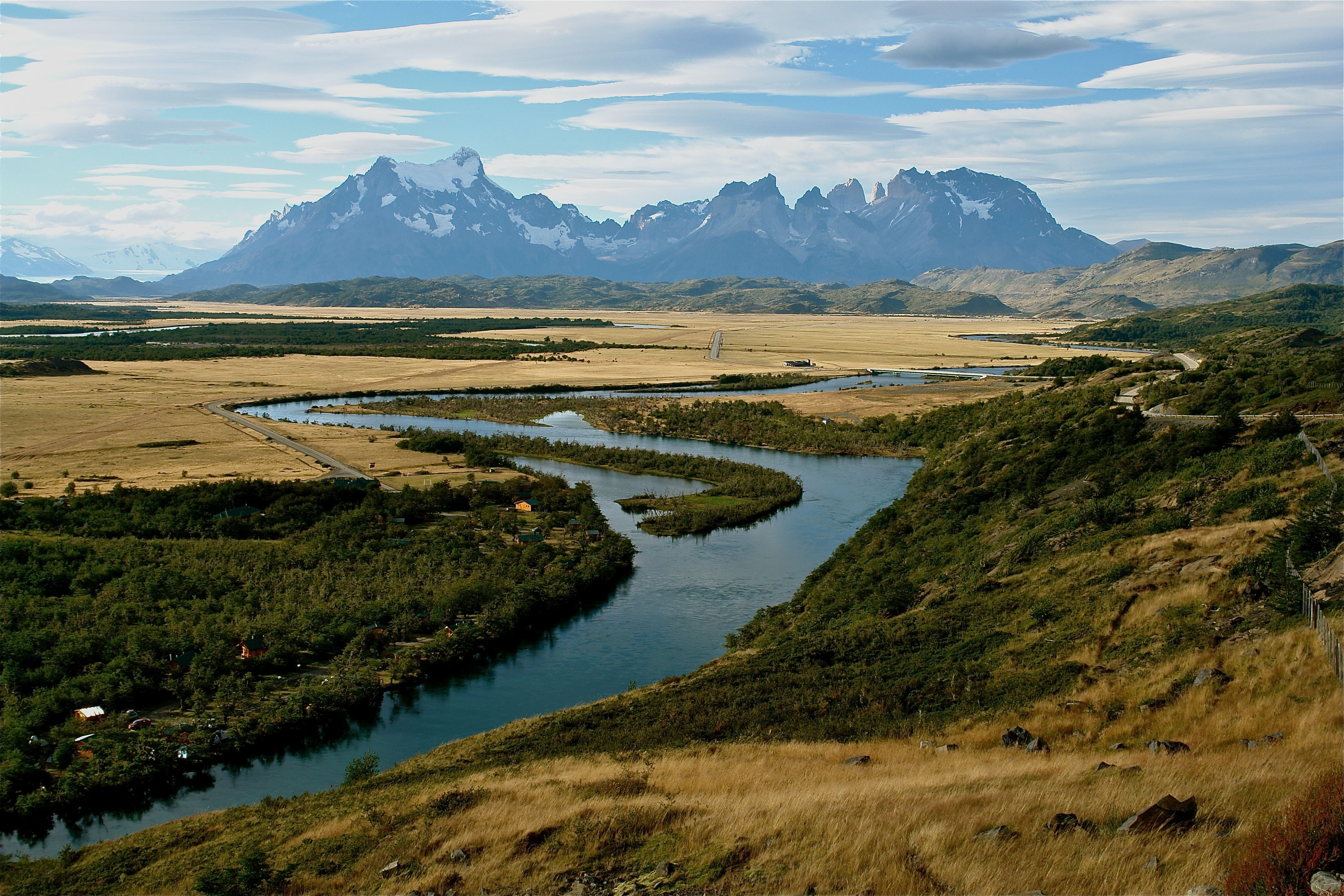
- The Cordillera del Paine and Serrano River at Sunset

Location
- Country: Chile

Physical characteristics
- Source
  - location: Del Toro Lake
- Mouth
  - location: Última Esperanza Sound
- Length: 38 km (24 mi)
- Basin size: 6,673 km^{2} (2,576 sq mi)

Serrano River is a river located in the Magallanes Region of Chile. Its main tributary is Grey River. The Serrano Glacier is an attraction on the river. The waters of the Serrano River eventually reach Seno Ultima Esperanza.

The Chilean scientific agency CEQUA confirmed an infestation of the algae Didymo in the Serrano River in early 2015.

== Area prehistory ==
Several significant elements of prehistory have been found in the region. Notably, not far from the southern area of the river's mouth is situated the Cueva del Milodon, a cave where evidence of prehistoric people's habitation has been found, illustrating the arrival of humans approximately 6,000 BC.

== See also ==
- Salto Grande
- List of rivers of Chile
