= Nordenskjöld Lake =

Lake in Torres del Paine National Park, Chile

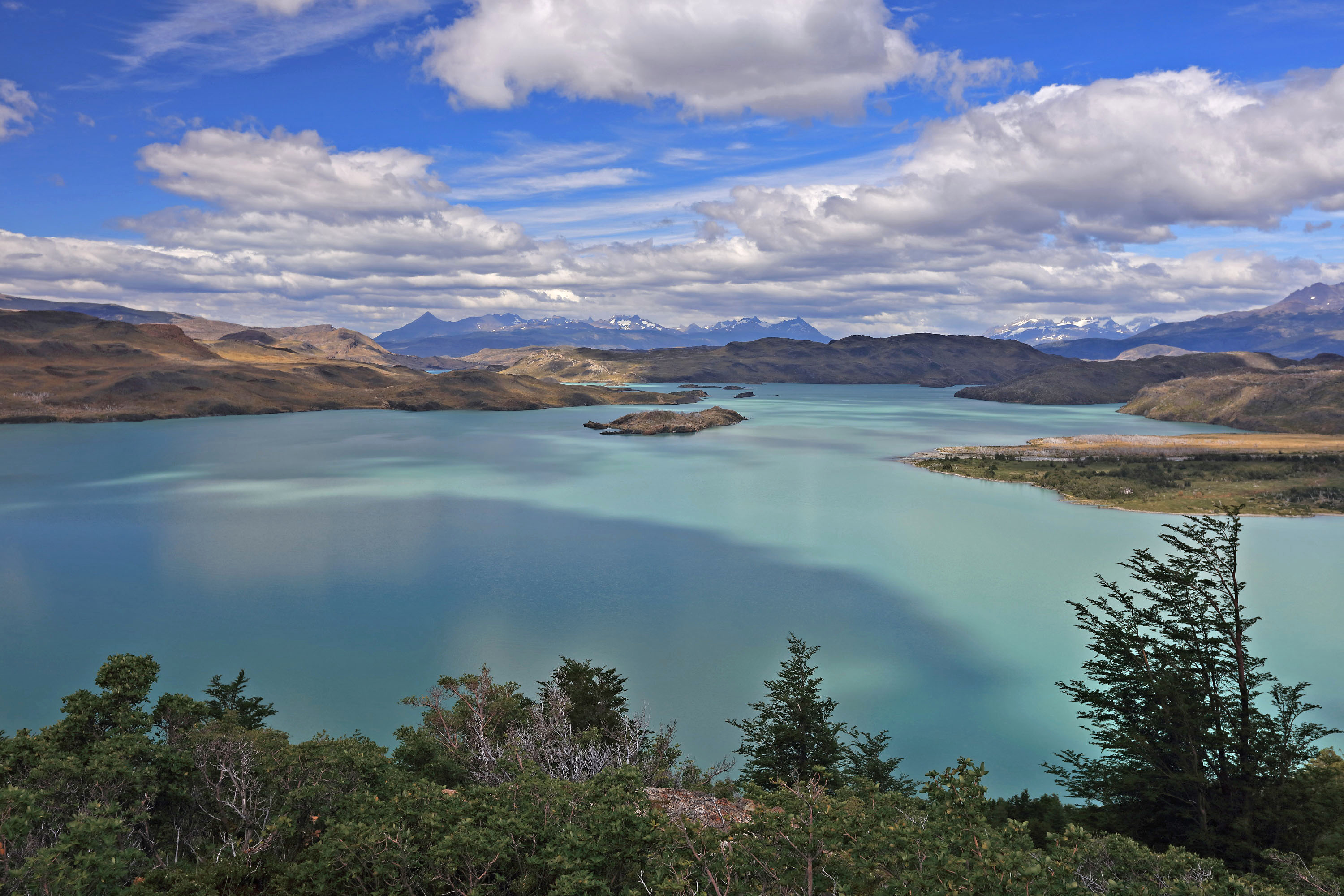

- Location within Chile
- Location: Magallanes Region
- Coordinates: 51°02′S 73°00′W
- Primary inflows: Paine River
- Primary outflows: Paine River
- Basin countries: Chile
- Max. length: 15 km (9.3 mi)
- Surface area: 28 km^{2} (11 sq mi)

The Nordenskjöld (Spanish: Lago Nordenskjöld or Lago Nordenskiöld) is a lake in Torres del Paine National Park in the Magallanes Region, southern Chile. The lake is named after the Swede Otto Nordenskjöld, who explored the region at the beginning of the 20th century. The outfall of Nordenskjöld Lake consists of a waterfall known as Salto Grande. At this western end of the lake on the southern side is an abundance of wildlife, including grazing guanaco.

Nordenskjöld Lake, in the Torres del Paine National Park
