= Grey Glacier =

Glacier of Chile

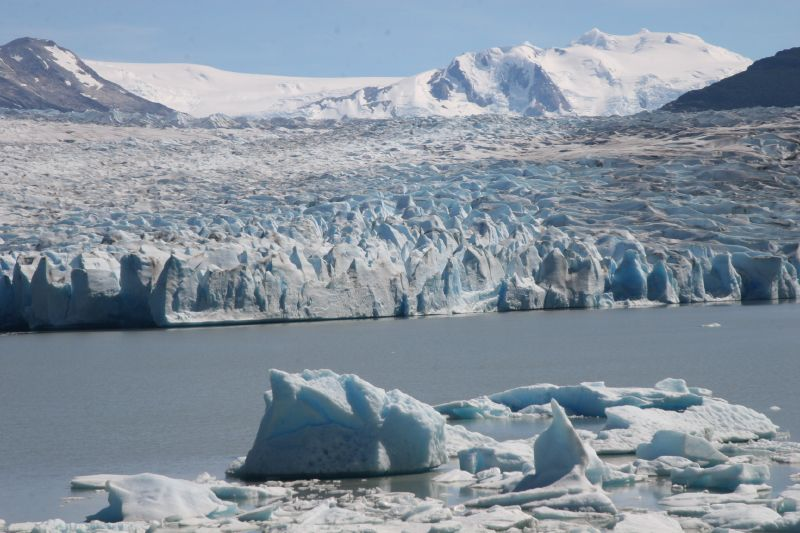
- Grey Glacier
- Interactive map of Grey Glacier
- Type: Mountain glacier
- Location: Chile
- Coordinates: 50°57′S 73°15′W
- Area: 270 km^{2} (100 sq mi)
- Length: 28 km (17 mi)
- Terminus: Glacial lake
- Status: Retreating

The Grey Glacier melts forming Grey Lake in Torres del Paine National Park in southern Chilean Patagonia - 2024.

Grey Glacier is a glacier in the Southern Patagonian Ice Field, just west of the Cordillera del Paine. It flows southward into the lake of the same name. Before dividing in two at its front end, the glacier is 6 kilometers wide and over 30 meters high. In 1996, it occupied a total area of 270 km^{2} (100 sq mi) and a length of 28 km (17 mi). In November 2017 a large iceberg broke off the glacier.

Deep blue cracks form crevasses within the Grey Glacier in southern Chilean Patagonia 2024.

Crevasses form within the Grey Glacier in southern Chilean Patagonia 2024.

== Surroundings ==
Recent retreat.

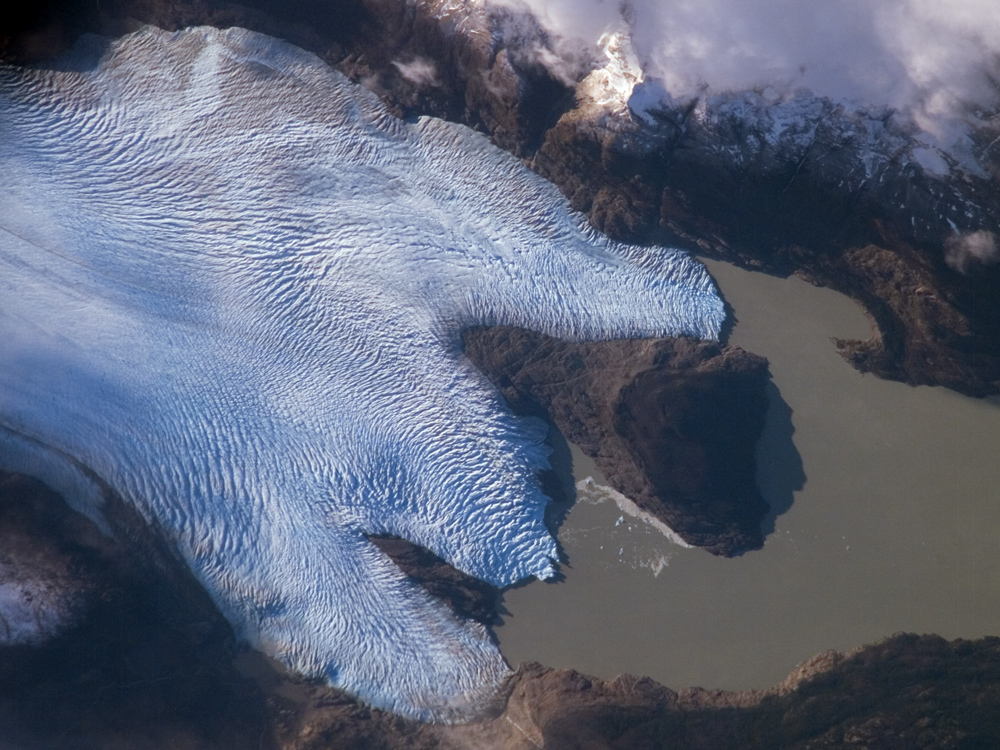
Grey Glacier seen from space.

The glacier is at the south end of the Southern Patagonia Ice Field. The surface of the lake can be seen when following the big circuit of Paine Mountain Range at John Garner Pass. There is another view of the glacier from the south shore of the lake where the glacier can be seen in the background, with fragments of ice floating close to the shore. It is located to the west side of the Torres del Paine National Park.

== Gallery ==
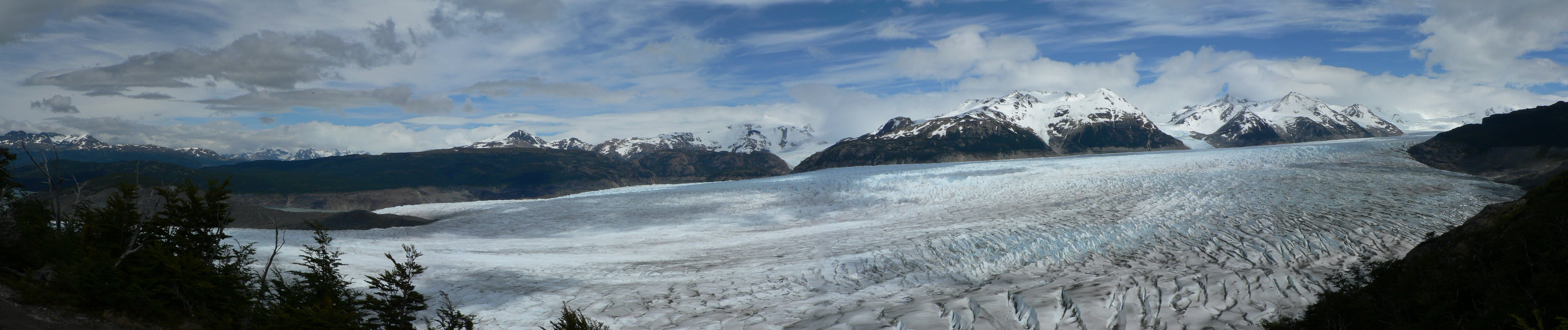
View from the west side

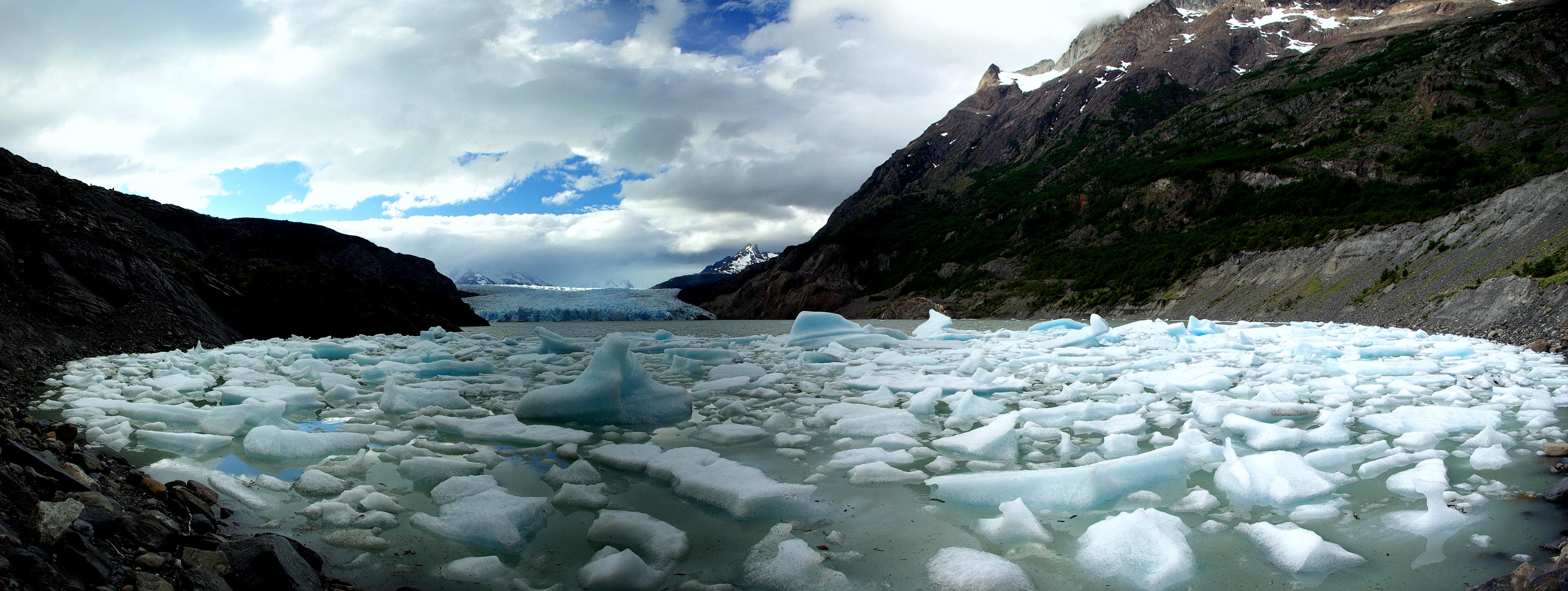
Icebergs calved by the glacier.

== See also ==
- List of glaciers
