= Sarmiento Lake =

Lake in Chile

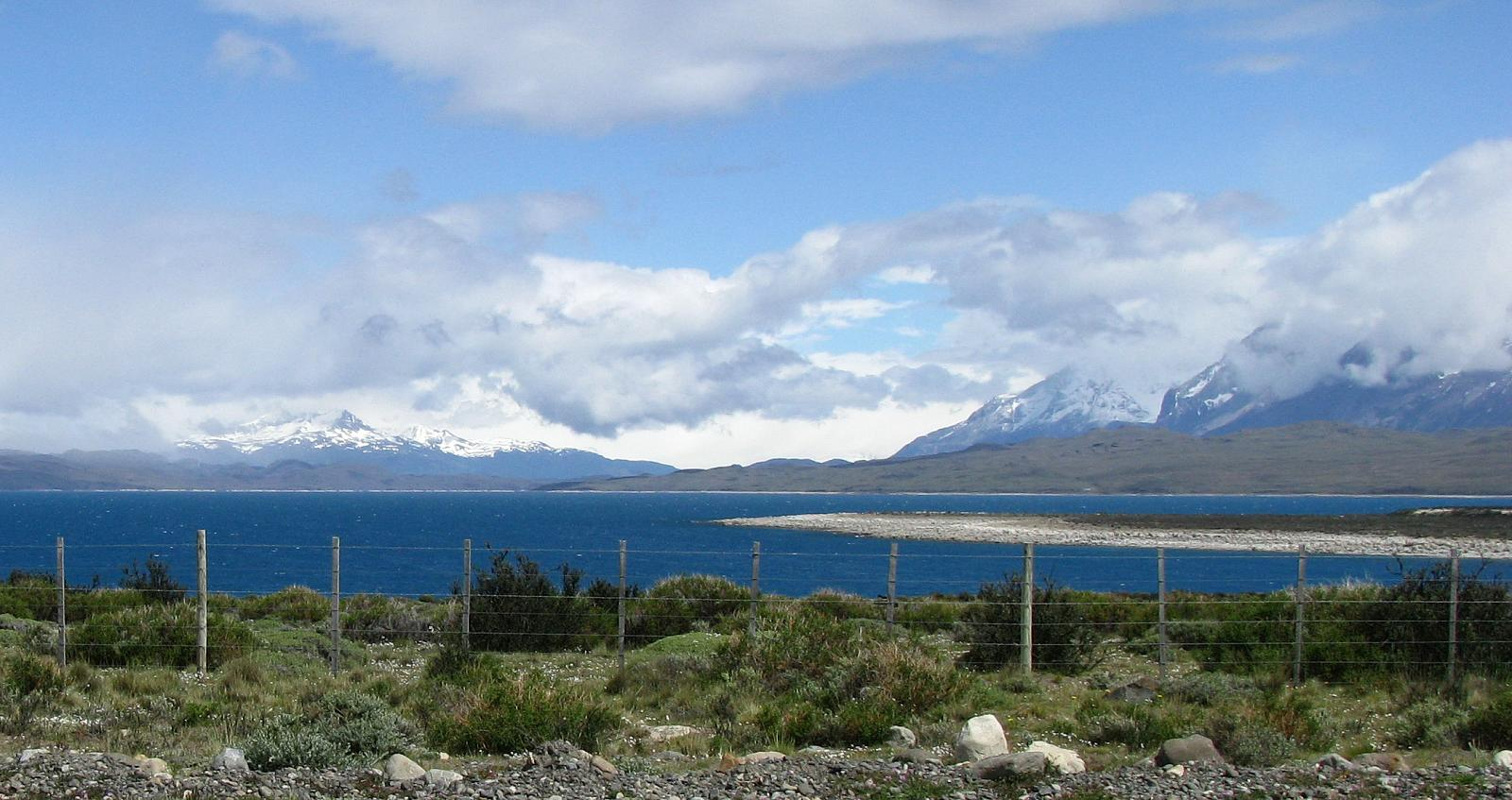

- Location within Chile
- Location: Última Esperanza Province
- Coordinates: 51°03′S 72°45′W
- Type: alkaline and endorheic
- Catchment area: 6,630 km^{2} (2,560 sq mi)
- Basin countries: Chile
- Max. length: 16 km (9.9 mi)
- Max. width: 6 km (3.7 mi)
- Surface area: 86.2 km^{2} (33.3 sq mi)
- Average depth: ~ 104 m (341 ft)
- Max. depth: 312 m (1,024 ft)
- Water volume: ~ 9 km^{3} (2.2 cu mi)
- Surface elevation: 75 m (246 ft)

Sarmiento Lake is a lake located in Torres del Paine National Park, in the Magallanes Region of southern Chile. It is named after Spanish explorer Pedro Sarmiento de Gamboa, and gives its name to one of the areas in the National Park Torres del Paine. Its edge is marked by extensive calcium carbonate "Thrombolites" deposits, possibly from hydrothermal activity in the lake.

== See also ==
- Salto Grande
