= Del Toro Lake =

Lake located in the Magallanes Region, Chile

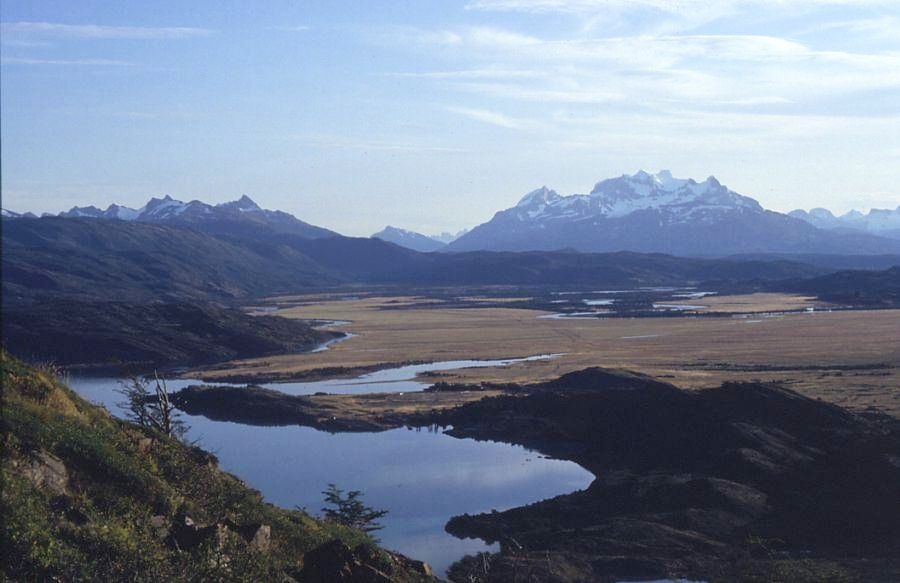
- Serrano river source

- Location within Chile
- Location: Última Esperanza Province
- Coordinates: 51°14′S 72°45′W
- Primary inflows: Paine River, Río de las Chinas
- Primary outflows: Serrano River
- Basin countries: Chile/Argentina
- Max. length: 24 km (15 mi)
- Max. width: 13 km (8.1 mi)
- Surface area: 202 km^{2} (78 sq mi)
- Average depth: 155 m (509 ft)
- Max. depth: 320 m (1,050 ft)
- Water volume: 31.31 km^{3} (7.51 cu mi)
- Surface elevation: 25 m (82 ft)
- Islands: one, near the eastern end of the lake, near Estancia San Antonio; numerous islets

Del Toro Lake (Spanish: Lago del Toro) is a lake located in the Magallanes Region, southern Chile. The lake is also known as Lago del Toro or Lago Toro (in English: Lake Bull); its name comes from the lake's ability to generate 4 m swells due to a long (~30 km) fetch and high winds aligned with the long axis of the lake. Locals say that the lake and the nearby mountain Sierra del Toro are so named because the lake "is angry a lot".

Services on the lake include camping and fishing at Bahia el Bote.

== See also ==
- Cerro Toro
- Salto Grande
