= Paine River =

River located in the Magallanes Region of Chile

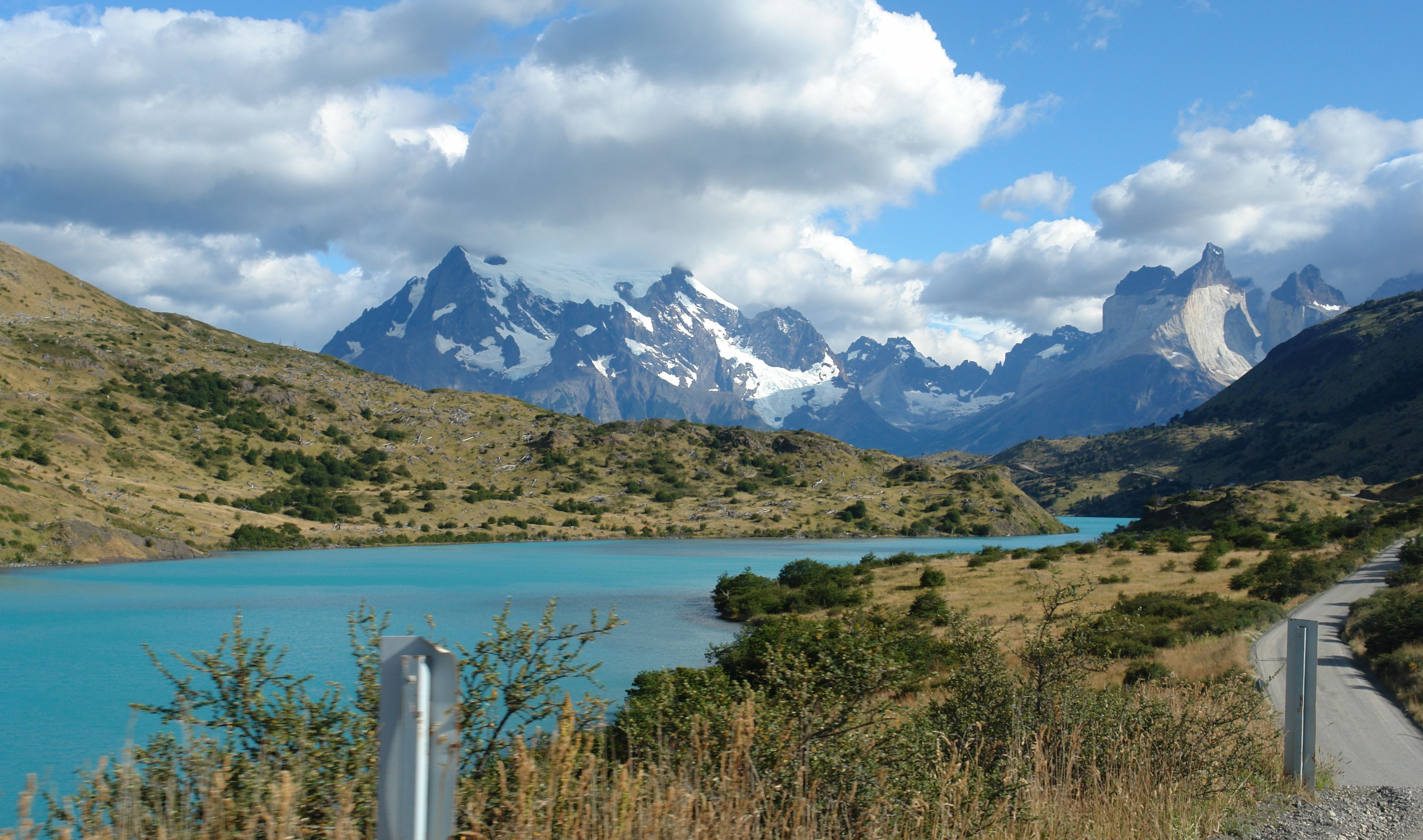

Location
- Country: Chile

Physical characteristics
- Source
  - location: Dickson Lake
- Mouth
  - location: Del Toro Lake

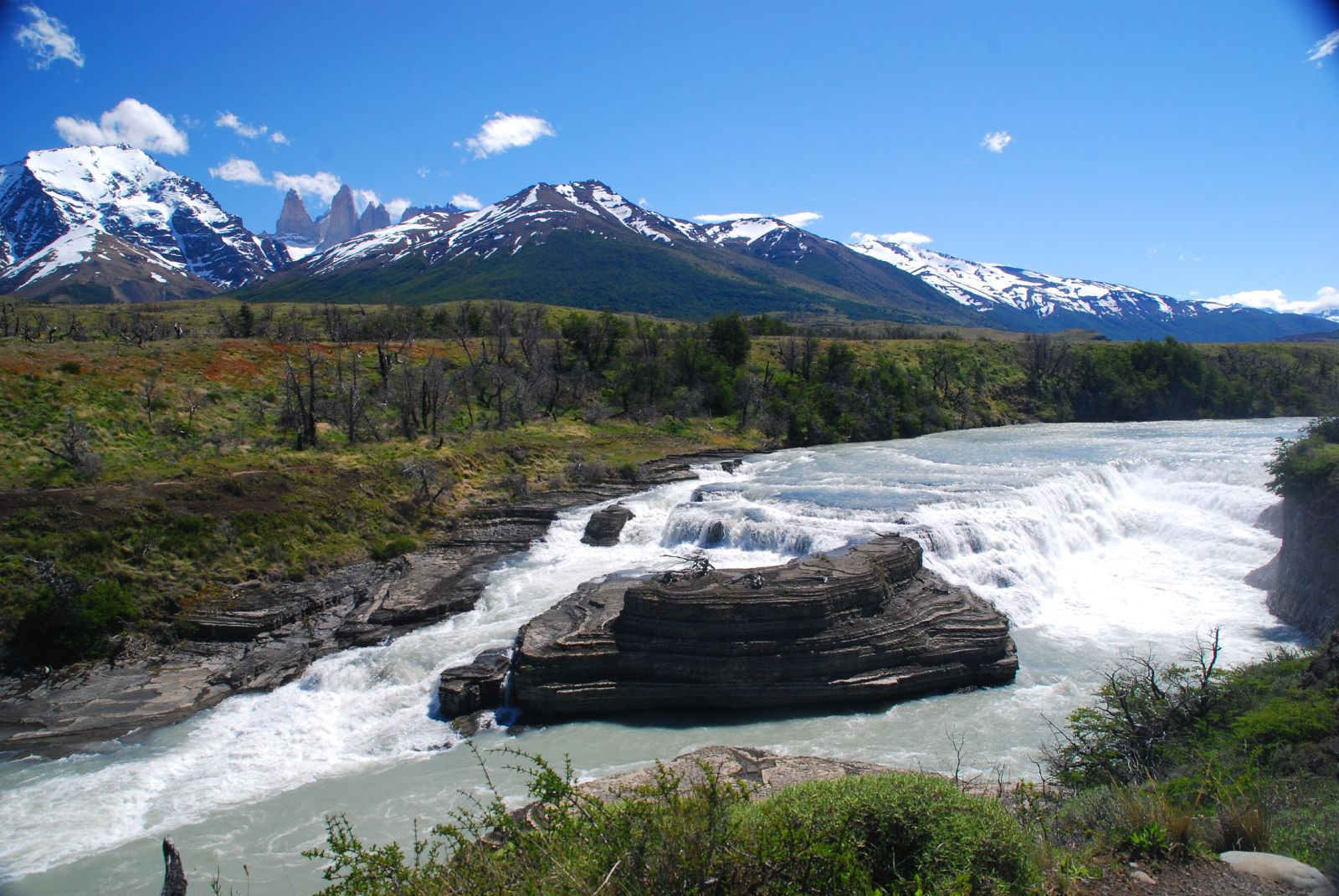
Paine Cascade

Map of Torres del Paine National Park with Lago Dickson, the source of Río Paine, at the top

Paine River (Spanish: Río Paine) is a river located in the Magallanes Region of Chile. The river rises from its source in Dickson Lake and flows east for nine kilometres (km) to Paine Lake. After flowing through the lake, the river runs for 15 km, first southward and then westward to Nordenskjöld Lake. This part of the river's course includes the Paine Cascade.

From the mouth of Nordenskjöld Lake, the river flows for a short distance falling into Pehoe Lake. In this area the river forms a spectacular waterfall known as Salto Grande. Along the Paine River, and specifically in the vicinity of Salto Grande, are a variety of natural vegetation forms as well as certain wildlife species, including the wild guanaco. After leaving lake Pehoe, the river forms another waterfall called Salto Chico and runs its last 6 km until emptying into the Del Toro Lake. Its lower course is wide and deep.

Along its course the river borders the Cordillera del Paine.

Paine means "blue" in the native Tehuelche (Aonikenk) language and is pronounced PIE-nay.

== Sources ==
- Abraham, Rudolf (2011). Torres del Paine: Trekking in Chile's Premier National Park. Milnthorpe: Cicerone Press. ISBN 978-1-84965-356-5.
- Gobierno de Chile (2004). Cuenca del río Serrano
- Hogan, C. Michael (2008). Guanaco: Lama guanicoe, GlobalTwitcher.com, ed. N. Strömberg
