= Salto Grande (waterfall) =

Waterfall on the Paine River, Chile

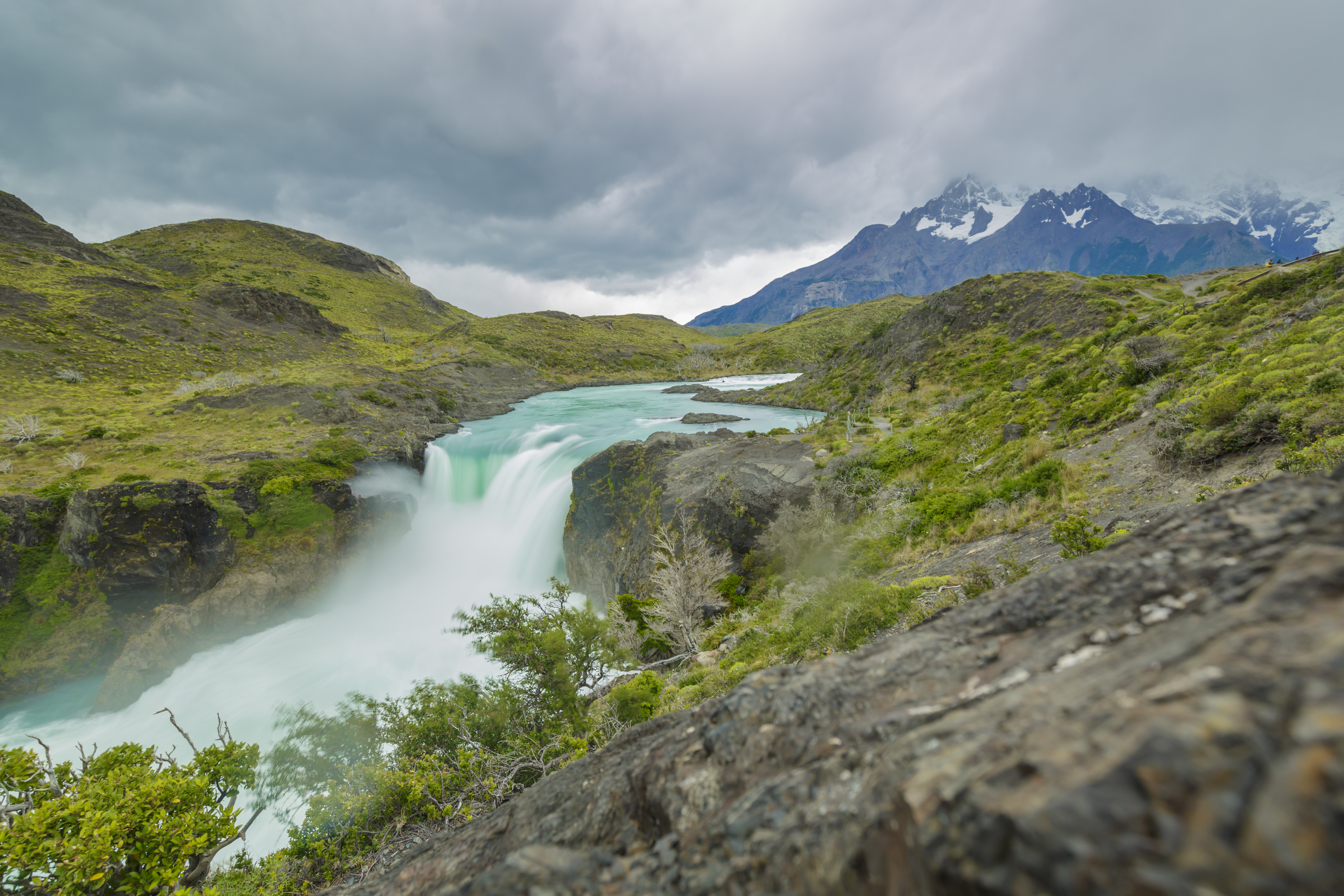
- Oblique view of Salto Grande
- Interactive map of Salto Grande
- Location: Torres del Paine National Park, Chile
- Coordinates: 51°04′03″S 73°00′28″W
- Elevation: 65 m (213 ft)
- Watercourse: Paine River

The Salto Grande is a waterfall on the Paine River, after the Nordenskjöld Lake, within the Torres del Paine National Park in Chile. In the vicinity of Salto Grande are a variety of natural vegetation forms as well as certain wildlife species, including the wild guanaco.

Salto Grande is between Lago Nordenskjöld and Lago Pehoé (but unmarked) on this map of the Torres del Paine National Park in Chile.

== See also ==
- Lake Sarmiento
- List of waterfalls

== Notes ==
- C. Michael Hogan. 2008. Guanaco: Lama guanicoe, GlobalTwitcher.com, ed. N. Strömberg
- Haas Mroue, Kristina Schreck and Michael Luongo. 2005. Frommer's Argentina & Chile, third edition, Published by John Wiley & Sons, ISBN 978-0-7645-9926-2
