= Cerro Fortaleza =

Mountain in Chile

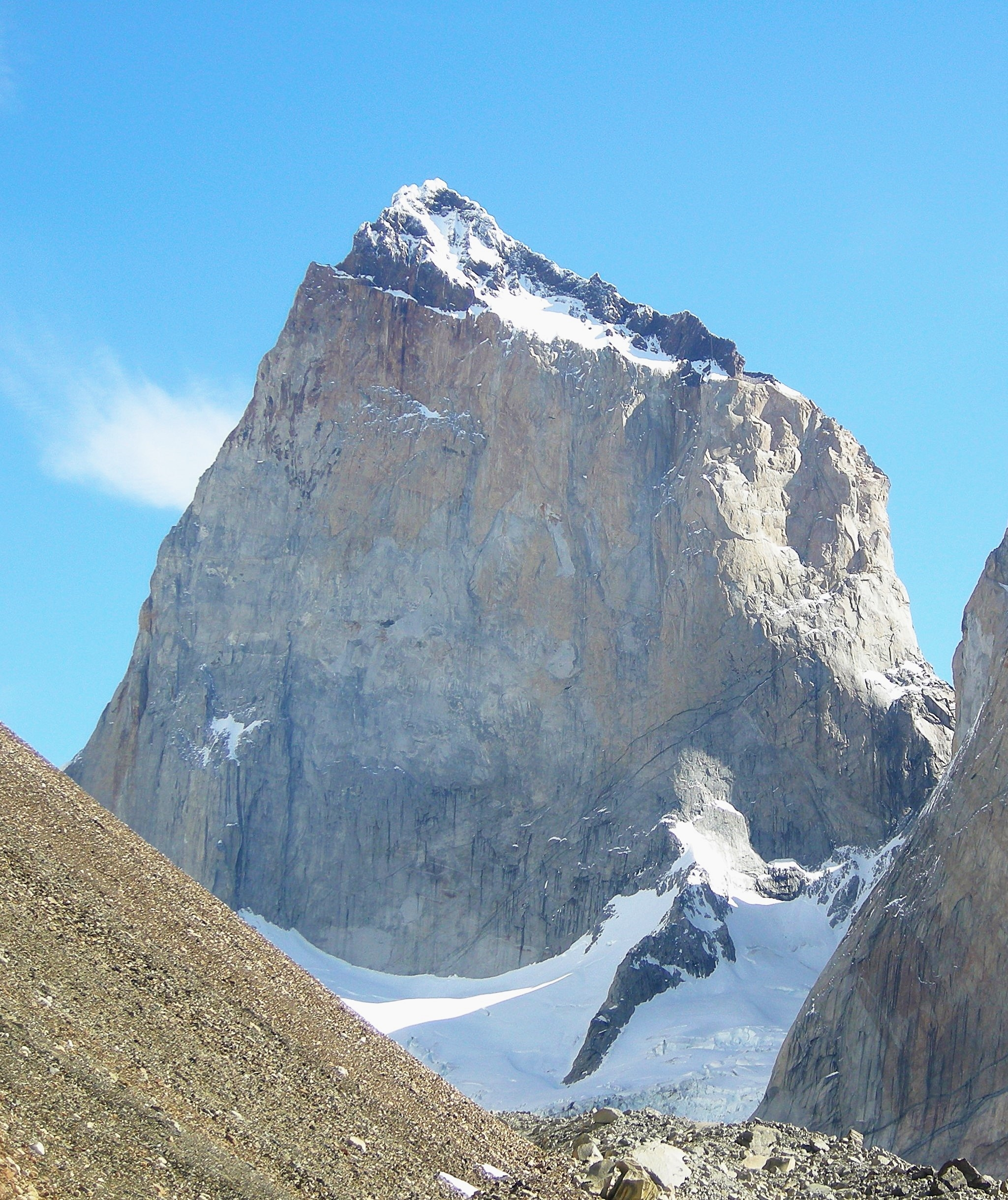
- Northeast aspect

Highest point
- Elevation: 2,681 m (8,796 ft)
- Prominence: 911 m (2,989 ft)
- Isolation: 2.18 km (1.35 mi)
- Coordinates: 50°57′24″S 73°01′22″W

Geography
- Location within Chile Location within Southern Patagonia Location within South America
- Interactive map of Cerro Fortaleza
- Country: Chile
- Province: Última Esperanza Province
- Protected area: Torres del Paine National Park
- Parent range: Andes; Cordillera Paine
- Topo map: IGM 1:50,000 Paine (Hoja Paine)

Geology
- Rock age: Miocene
- Rock type(s): Granite, Schist

Climbing
- First ascent: 1968

Cerro Fortaleza is a mountain in the Magallanes Region of Chile.

== Description ==
Cerro Fortaleza is a 2,681-meter-elevation (8,796-foot) summit in the Cordillera Paine group of the Andes. The peak is located 100 kilometers (62 miles) north-northwest of Puerto Natales, and the peak is the second-highest in Torres del Paine National Park. Precipitation runoff from the mountain's slopes drains to Nordenskjöld Lake which is part of the Paine River watershed. Topographic relief is significant as the summit rises 1,800 meters (6,168 feet) above the Francés Valley in three kilometers (1.86 miles), and 1,480 meters (4,855 feet) above the Valley of Silence in one kilometer (0.6 mile). The mountain's toponym translates as "Fortress Mountain." The first ascent of the summit was accomplished on January 5, 1968, by John Gregory, Gordon Hibberd, and Dave Nicol. The nearest higher peak is Monte Almirante Nieto, 2.2 kilometers (1.37 miles) to the southeast.

== Climate ==
Based on the Köppen climate classification, Cerro Fortaleza is located in a tundra climate zone with long, cold winters, and short, cool summers. Weather systems are forced upward by the mountains (orographic lift), causing moisture to drop in the form of rain and snow. The months of December through February offer the most favorable weather for visiting or climbing in this area, however the region is characterized by low temperatures and strong winds throughout the year.

== Geology ==
The range is made up of granite underlain by gray gabbro-diorite laccolith and the sedimentary rocks it intrudes, deeply eroded by glaciers. The hot granite that intruded parallel to the sedimentary rock converted the mudstone and sandstone into a dark metamorphic rock. The steep, light colored faces are eroded from the tougher, vertically jointed granitic rocks, while the foothills and dark cap rocks are the sedimentary country rock, in this case flysch deposited in the Cretaceous and later folded.

The radiometric age for the quartz diorite is 12 ± 2 million years by the rubidium-strontium method and 13 ± 1 million years by the potassium-argon method. More precise ages of 12.59 ± 0.02 and 12.50 ± 0.02 million years for the earliest and latest identified phases of the intrusion, respectively, were achieved using Uranium–lead dating methods on single zircon crystals. Basal gabbro and diorite were dated by a similar technique to 12.472 ± 0.009 to 12.431 ± 0.006 million years. Thus, magma was intruded and crystallized over 162 ± 11 thousand years.

== Gallery ==
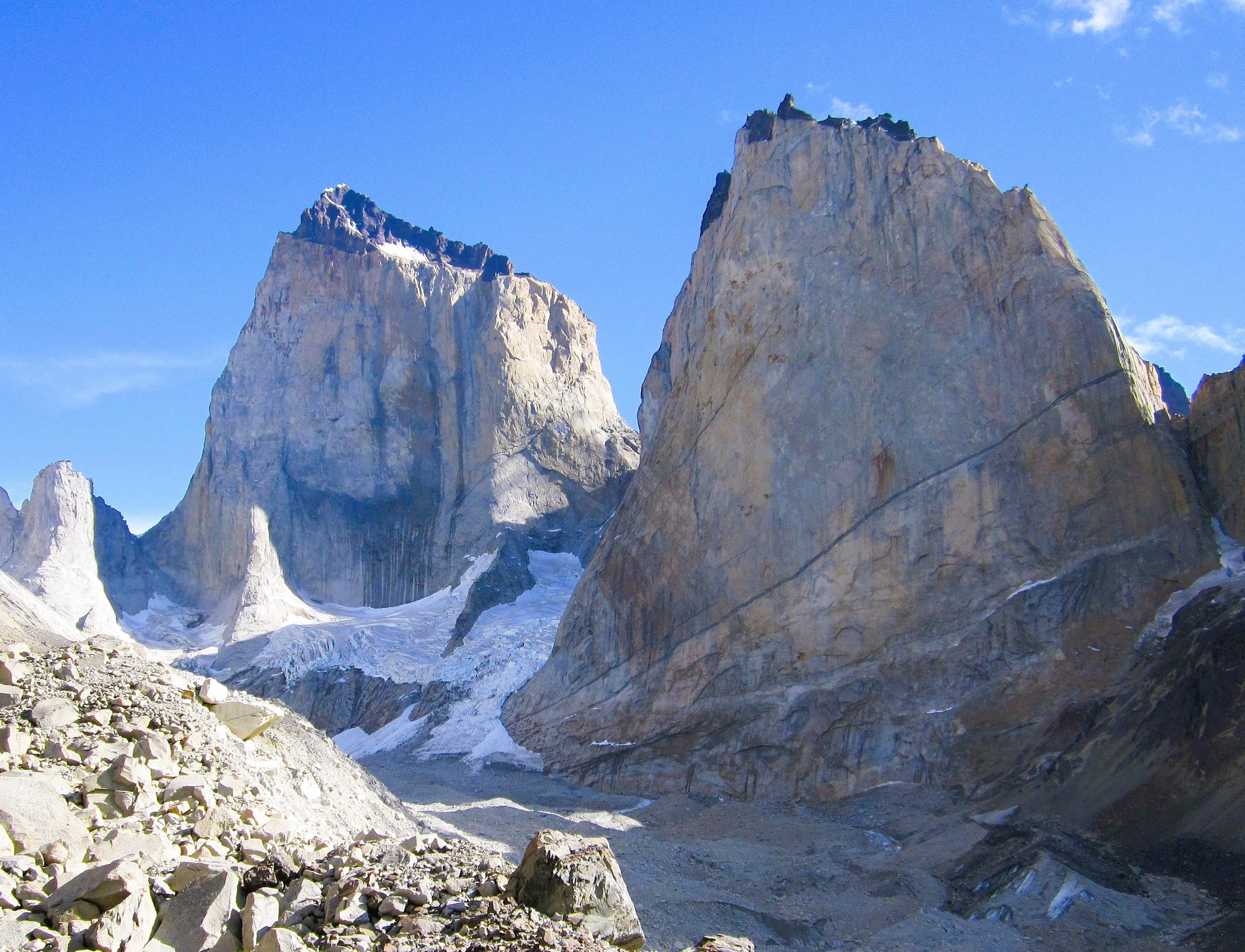
Cerro Fortaleza (left) and Cerro Escudo (right)
View from the Valle del Silencio (Valley of Silence)

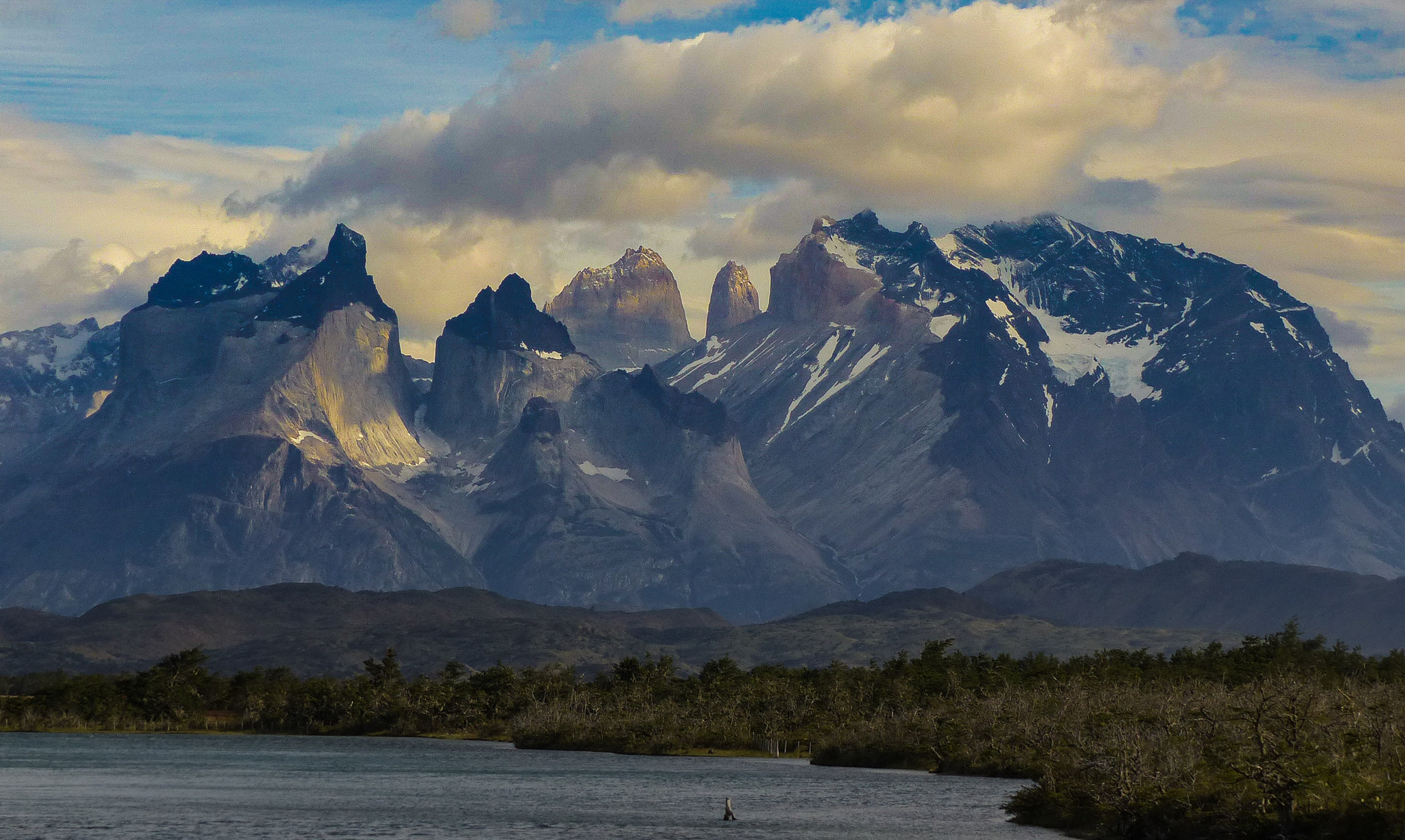
South aspect of Cerro Fortaleza centered in back
Cuernos del Paine to left, Monte Almirante Nieto to right

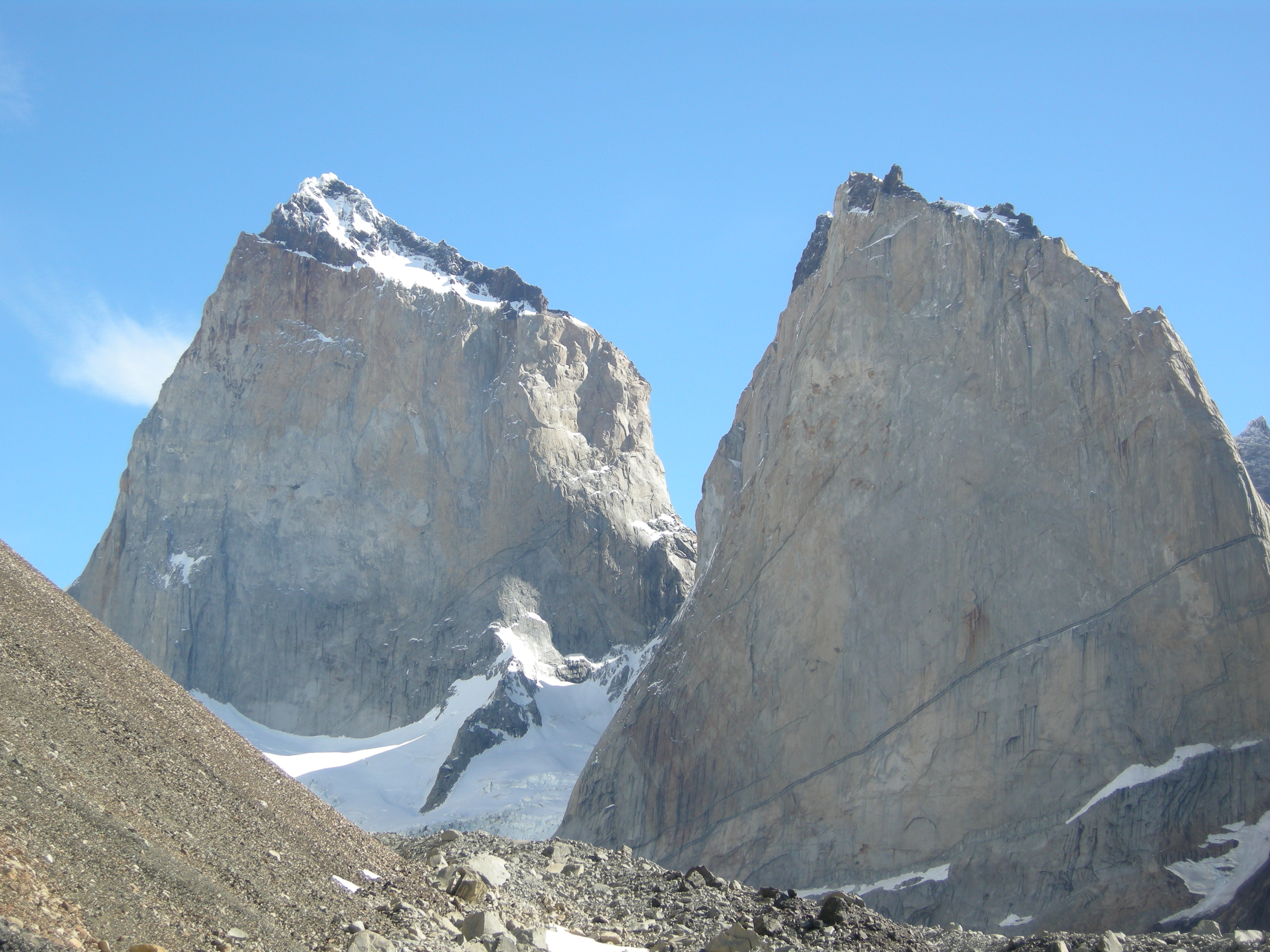
Cerro Fortaleza (left) and Cerro Escudo (right)

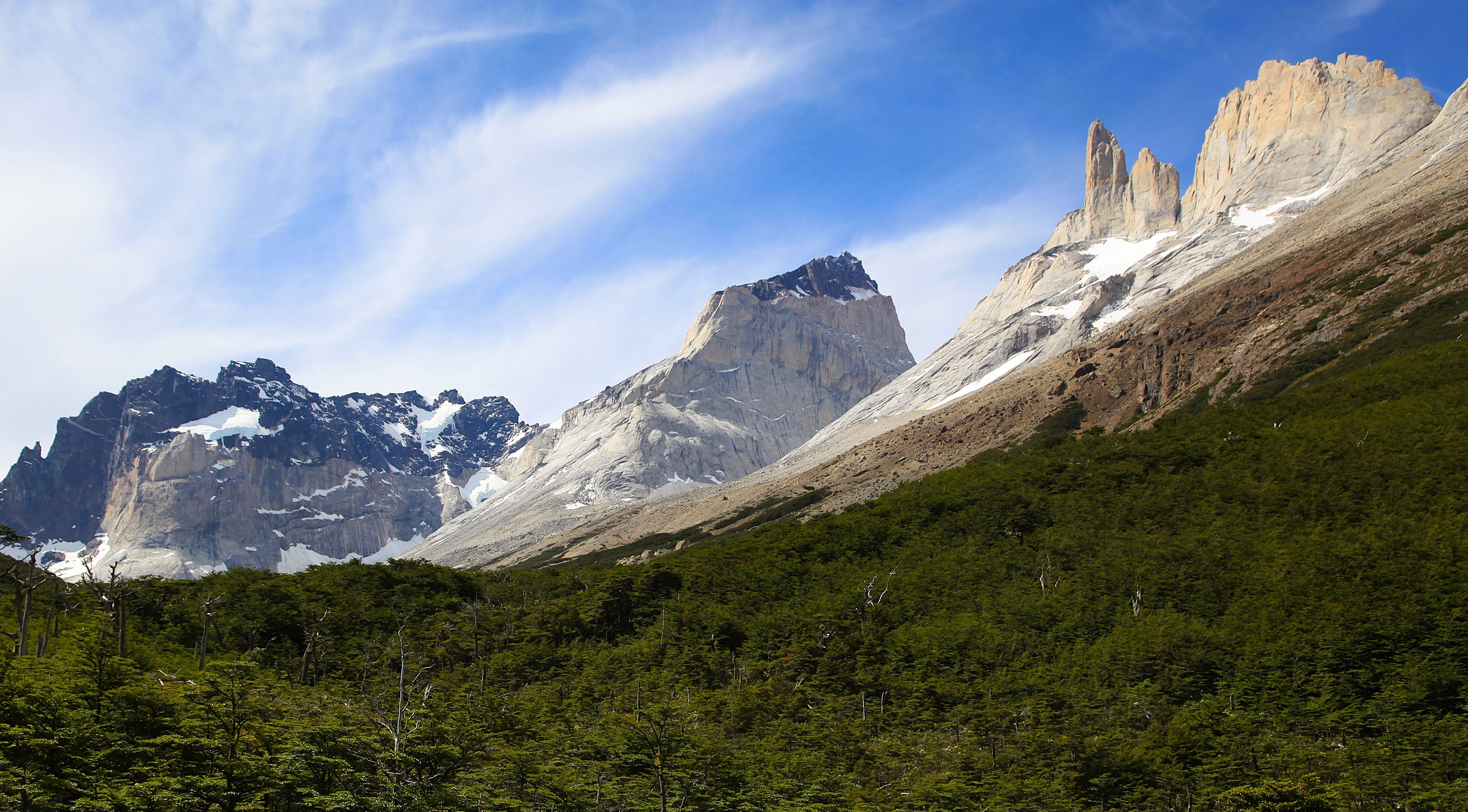
Left to rightː Cerro Cabeza de Indio, Cerro Fortaleza (centered), La Espada, La Hoja viewed from French Valley

== See also ==
- Patagonia
