= Cerro Cabeza de Indio =

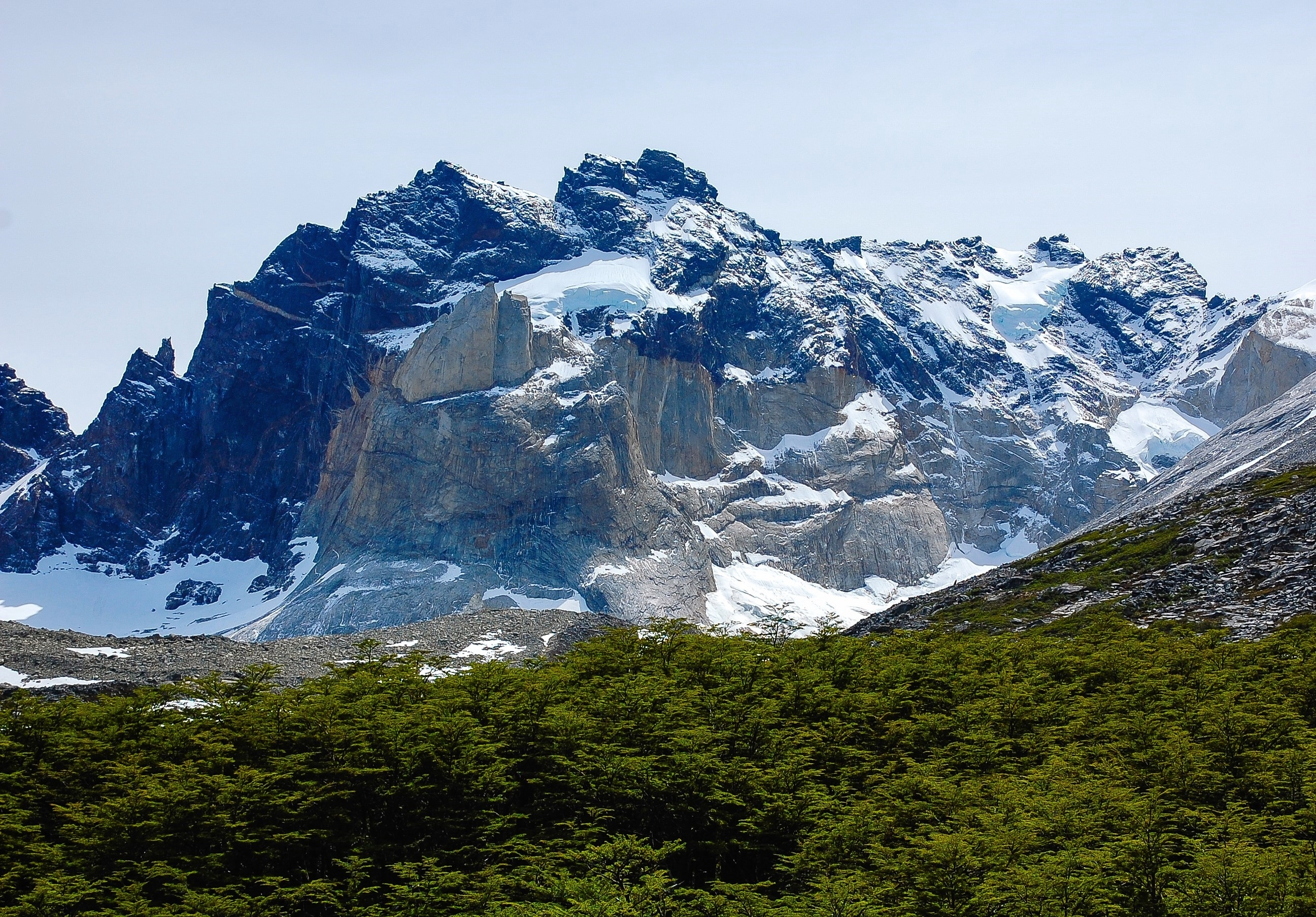
- South aspect

Highest point
- Elevation: 2,230 m (7,316 ft)
- Prominence: 148 m (486 ft)
- Parent peak: Cerro Escudo
- Isolation: 1.53 km (0.95 mi)
- Coordinates: 50°56′45″S 73°02′49″W

Naming
- Etymology: Indian Head

Geography
- Location within Chile Location within South America Location within Southern Patagonia
- Interactive map of Cerro Cabeza de Indio
- Country: Chile
- Province: Última Esperanza Province
- Protected area: Torres del Paine National Park
- Parent range: Andes; Cordillera Paine
- Topo map: IGM Paine (Hoja Paine)

Geology
- Rock age: Miocene
- Rock type(s): Granite, Schist

Climbing
- First ascent: 1981

Cerro Cabeza de Indio is a mountain in the Magallanes Region of Chile.

== Description ==
Cerro Cabeza de Indio is a 2,230-meter-elevation (7,316-foot) summit in the Cordillera Paine group of the Andes. The peak is located 100 kilometers (62 miles) north-northwest of Puerto Natales. The peak is situated at the head of Valle del Francés (French Valley) within Torres del Paine National Park. Precipitation runoff from the peak's slopes drains north to Dickson Lake and south to Nordenskjöld Lake which are both part of the Paine River watershed. Topographic relief is significant as the summit rises 1,280 meters (4,200 feet) above French Valley in two kilometers (1.6 miles), and 1,850 meters (6,070 feet) above Rio de los Perros in four kilometers (2.5 miles). The peak's descriptive Spanish toponym translates as "Head of Indian" which is seen in profile from the north near Dickson Lake. The nearest higher peak is Cerro Escudo, 1.53 kilometers (0.95 mile) to the east.

== Climate ==
Based on the Köppen climate classification, Cerro Cabeza de Indio is located in a tundra climate zone with long, cold winters, and short, cool summers. Weather systems are forced upward by the mountains (orographic lift), causing moisture to drop in the form of rain and snow. This climate supports a small unnamed glacier on the south slope. The months of December through February offer the most favorable weather for visiting or climbing in this area, however the region is characterized by low temperatures and strong winds throughout the year.

== Geology ==
The peak is composed of granite underlain by gray gabbro-diorite laccolith and the sedimentary rocks it intrudes, deeply eroded by glaciers. The hot granite that intruded parallel to the sedimentary rock converted the mudstone and sandstone into schist, a dark metamorphic rock. The steep, light colored faces are eroded from the tougher, vertically jointed granitic rocks, while the foothills and dark cap rocks are the sedimentary country rock, in this case flysch deposited in the Cretaceous and later folded.

The radiometric age for the quartz diorite is 12 ± 2 million years by the rubidium-strontium method and 13 ± 1 million years by the potassium-argon method. More precise ages of 12.59 ± 0.02 and 12.50 ± 0.02 million years for the earliest and latest identified phases of the intrusion, respectively, were achieved using Uranium–lead dating methods on single zircon crystals. Basal gabbro and diorite were dated by a similar technique to 12.472 ± 0.009 to 12.431 ± 0.006 million years. Thus, magma was intruded and crystallized over 162 ± 11 thousand years.

== Gallery ==
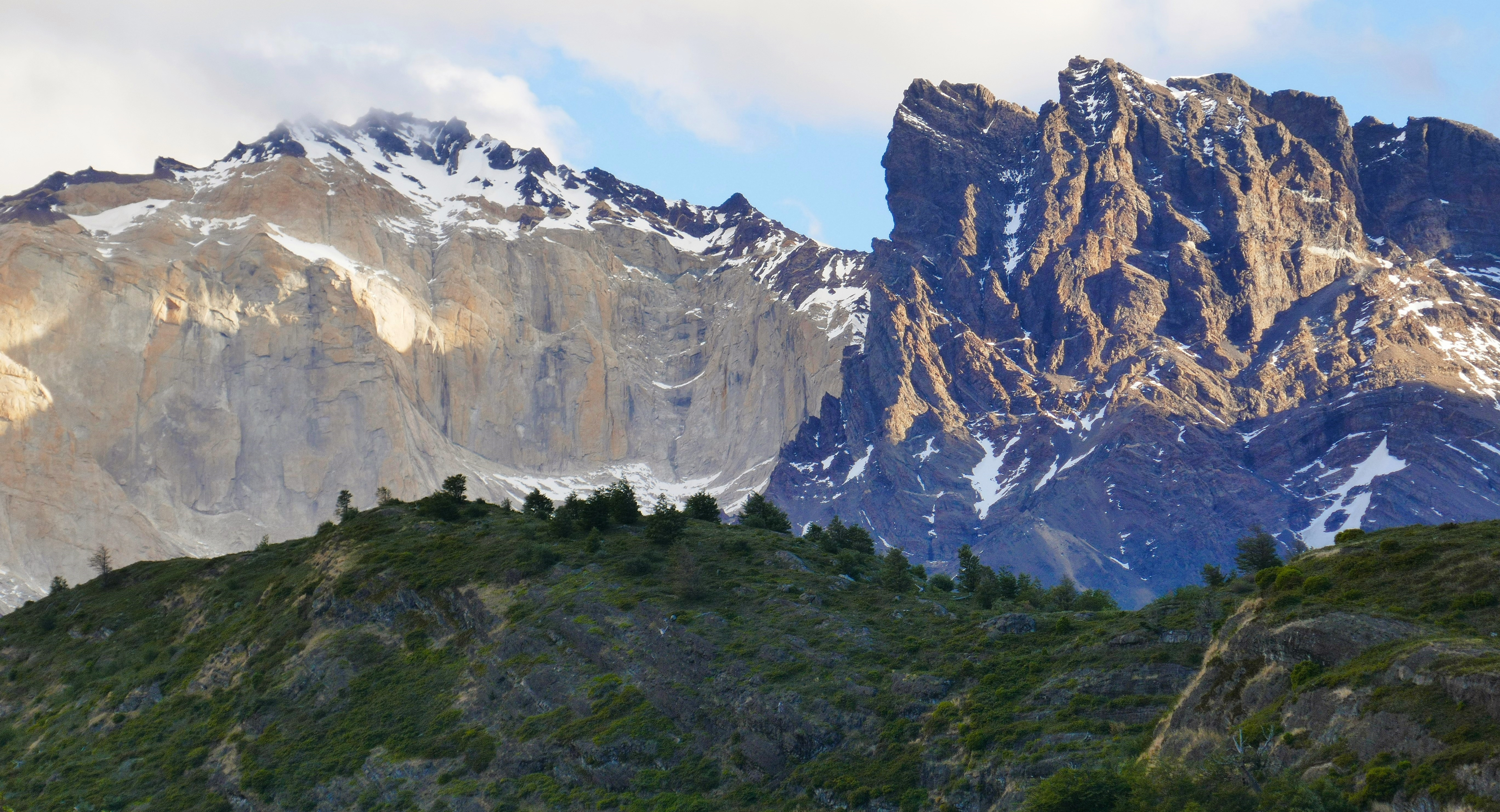
North aspects of Cerro Escudo (left) and Cerro Cabeza de Indio to right

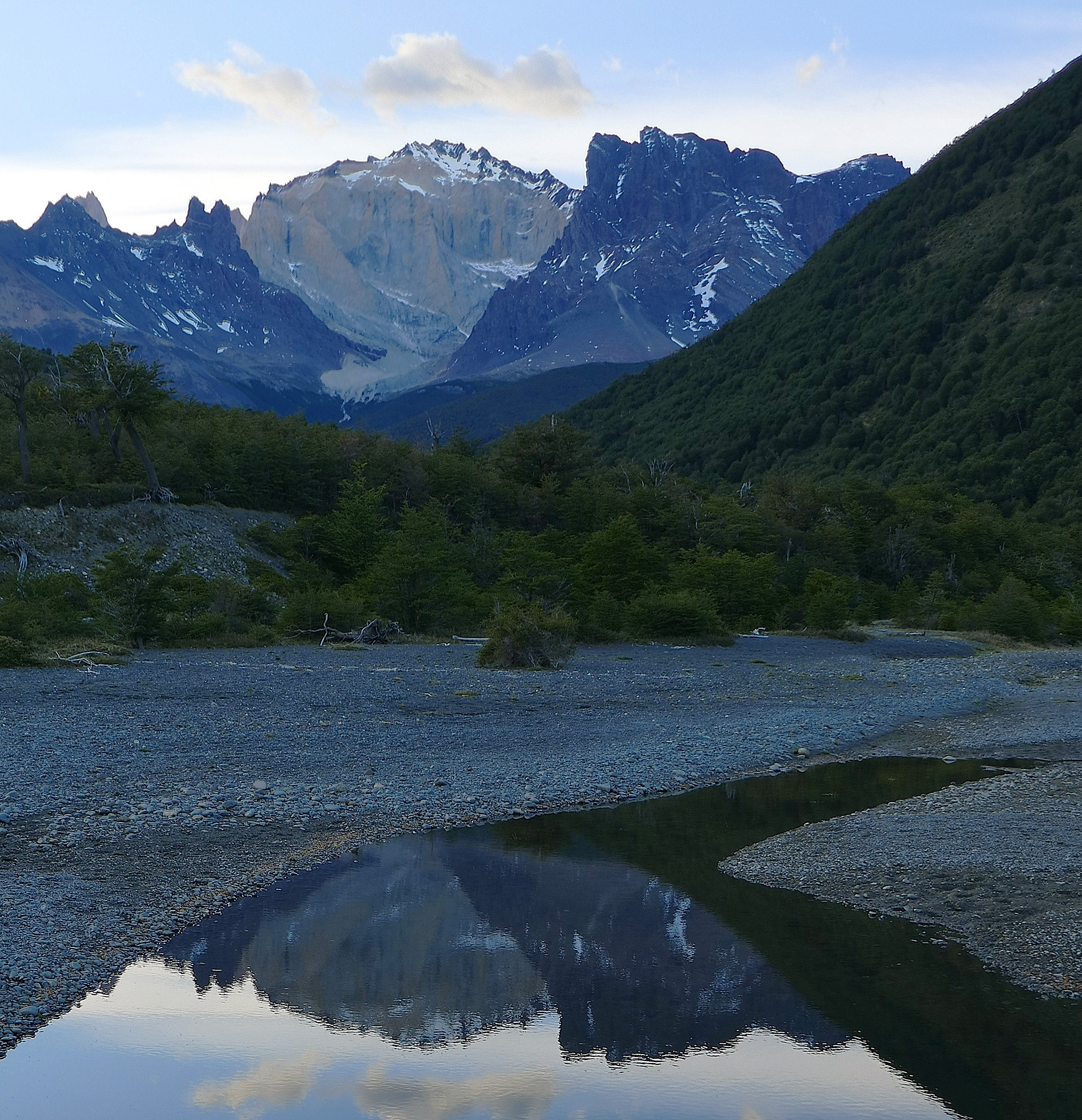
North aspects of Cerro Escudo to left and Cerro Cabeza de Indio to right as seen from Lake Dickson area

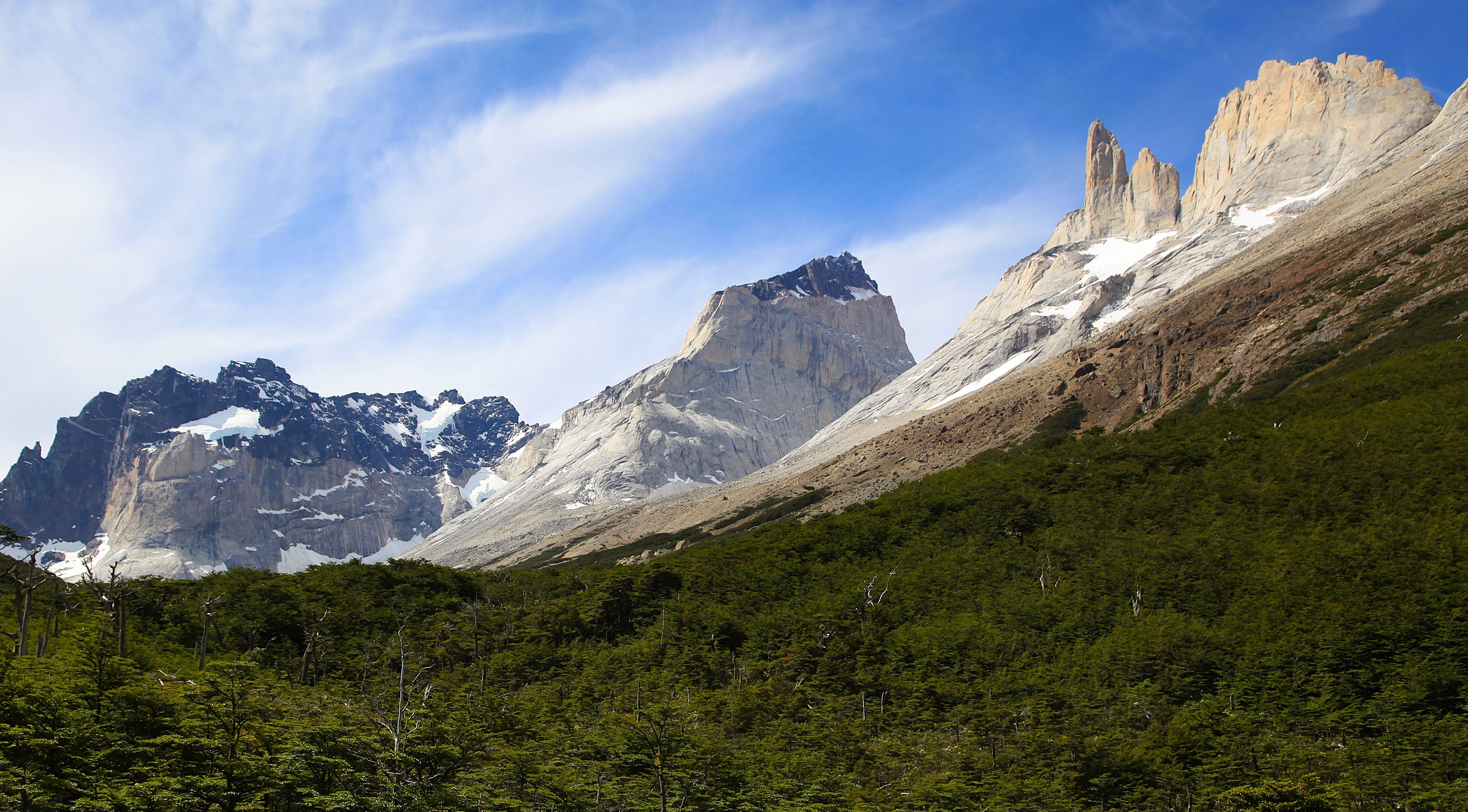
Cerro Cabeza de Indio (left), Cerro Fortaleza (center), La Espada (right) viewed from French Valley

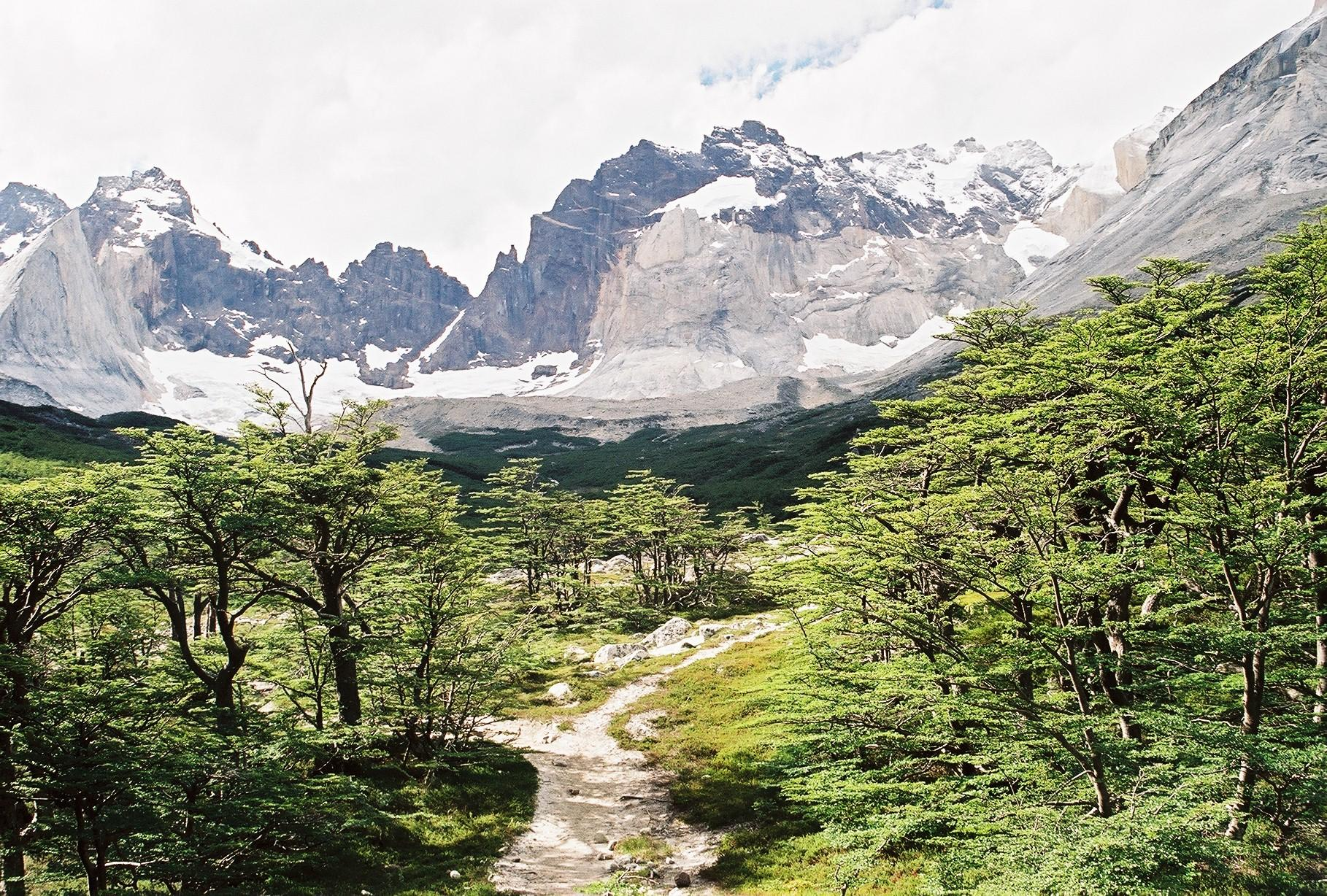
Cerro Trono Blanco (left), Cerro Cabeza de Indio (center)

== See also ==
- Patagonia
