= Cerro Escudo =

Mountain in Chile

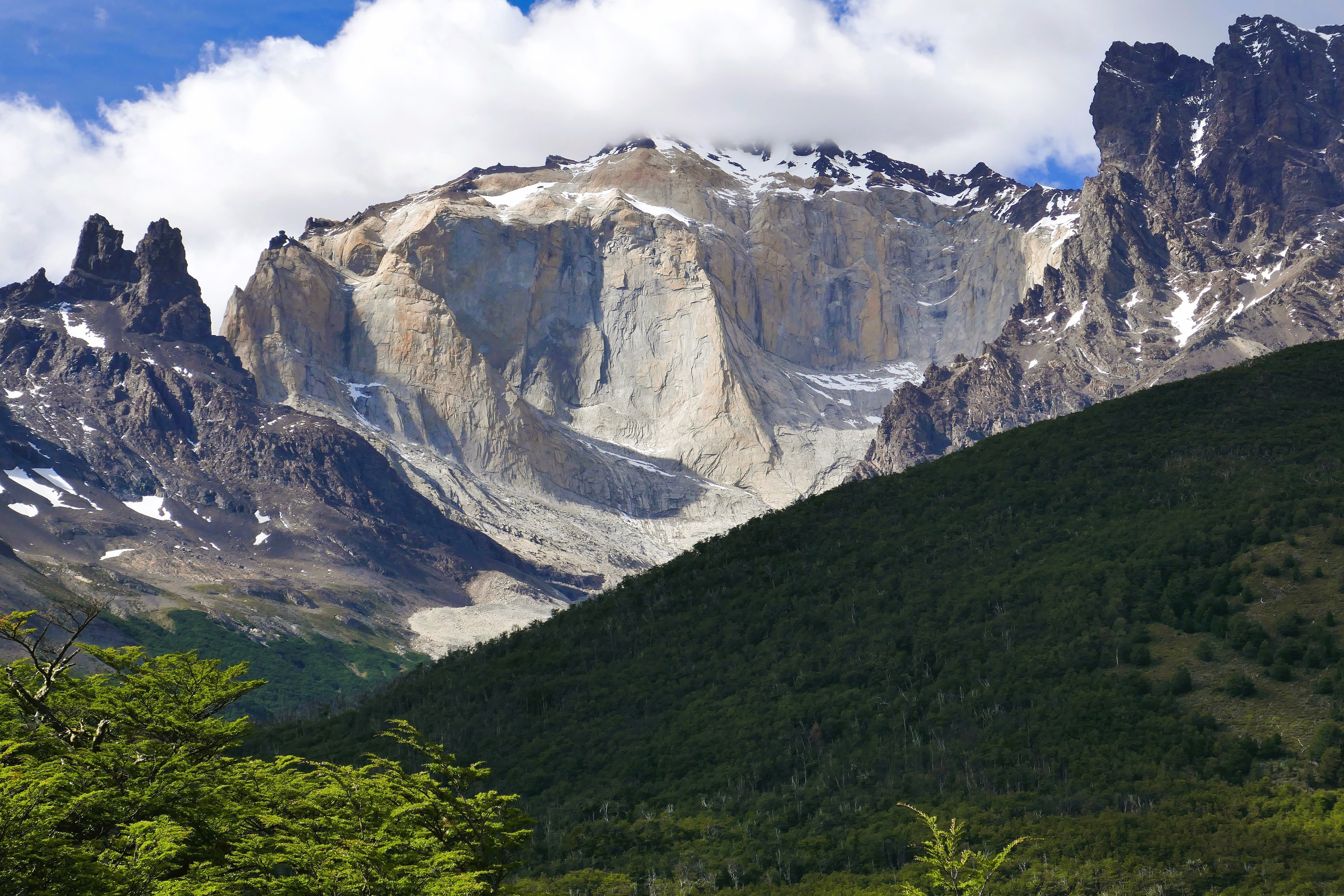
- North aspect

Highest point
- Elevation: 2,420 m (7,940 ft)
- Prominence: 408 m (1,339 ft)
- Parent peak: Cerro Fortaleza
- Isolation: 0.85 km (0.53 mi)
- Coordinates: 50°56′45″S 73°01′30″W

Naming
- Etymology: Shield Mountain

Geography
- Location within Chile Location within South America Location within Southern Patagonia
- Interactive map of Cerro Escudo
- Country: Chile
- Province: Última Esperanza Province
- Protected area: Torres del Paine National Park
- Parent range: Andes; Cordillera Paine
- Topo map: IGM Paine (Hoja Paine)

Geology
- Rock age: Miocene
- Rock type(s): Granite, Schist

Climbing
- First ascent: 1968

Cerro Escudo is a mountain in the Magallanes Region of Chile.

== Description ==
Cerro Escudo is a 2,420-meter-elevation (7,940-foot) summit in the Cordillera Paine group of the Andes. The peak is located 100 kilometers (62 miles) north-northwest of Puerto Natales. The peak is situated at the head of Valle del Silencio (Valley of Silence) within Torres del Paine National Park. Precipitation runoff from the peak's slopes drains into tributaries of the Paine River. Topographic relief is significant as the summit rises 1,300 meters (4,265 feet) above Valley of Silence in 0.5 kilometer (0.37 mile), and 2,200 meters (7,218 feet) above Dickson Lake in nine kilometers (5.6 miles). The first ascent of the summit was made on January 31, 1968, by Italians Mario Curnis and Mario Dotti. The peak's descriptive Spanish toponym translates as "Shield." The nearest higher peak is Cerro Fortaleza, 1.2 kilometers (0.75 mile) to the south.

== Climate ==
Based on the Köppen climate classification, Cerro Escudo is located in a tundra climate zone with long, cold winters, and short, cool summers. Weather systems are forced upward by the mountains (orographic lift), causing moisture to drop in the form of rain and snow. The months of December through February offer the most favorable weather for visiting or climbing in this area, however the region is characterized by low temperatures and strong winds throughout the year.

== Geology ==
The peak is composed of granite underlain by gray gabbro-diorite laccolith and the sedimentary rocks it intrudes, deeply eroded by glaciers. The hot granite that intruded parallel to the sedimentary rock converted the mudstone and sandstone into schist, a dark metamorphic rock. The steep, light colored faces are eroded from the tougher, vertically jointed granitic rocks, while the foothills and dark cap rocks are the sedimentary country rock, in this case flysch deposited in the Cretaceous and later folded.

The radiometric age for the quartz diorite is 12 ± 2 million years by the rubidium-strontium method and 13 ± 1 million years by the potassium-argon method. More precise ages of 12.59 ± 0.02 and 12.50 ± 0.02 million years for the earliest and latest identified phases of the intrusion, respectively, were achieved using Uranium–lead dating methods on single zircon crystals. Basal gabbro and diorite were dated by a similar technique to 12.472 ± 0.009 to 12.431 ± 0.006 million years. Thus, magma was intruded and crystallized over 162 ± 11 thousand years.

== Gallery ==
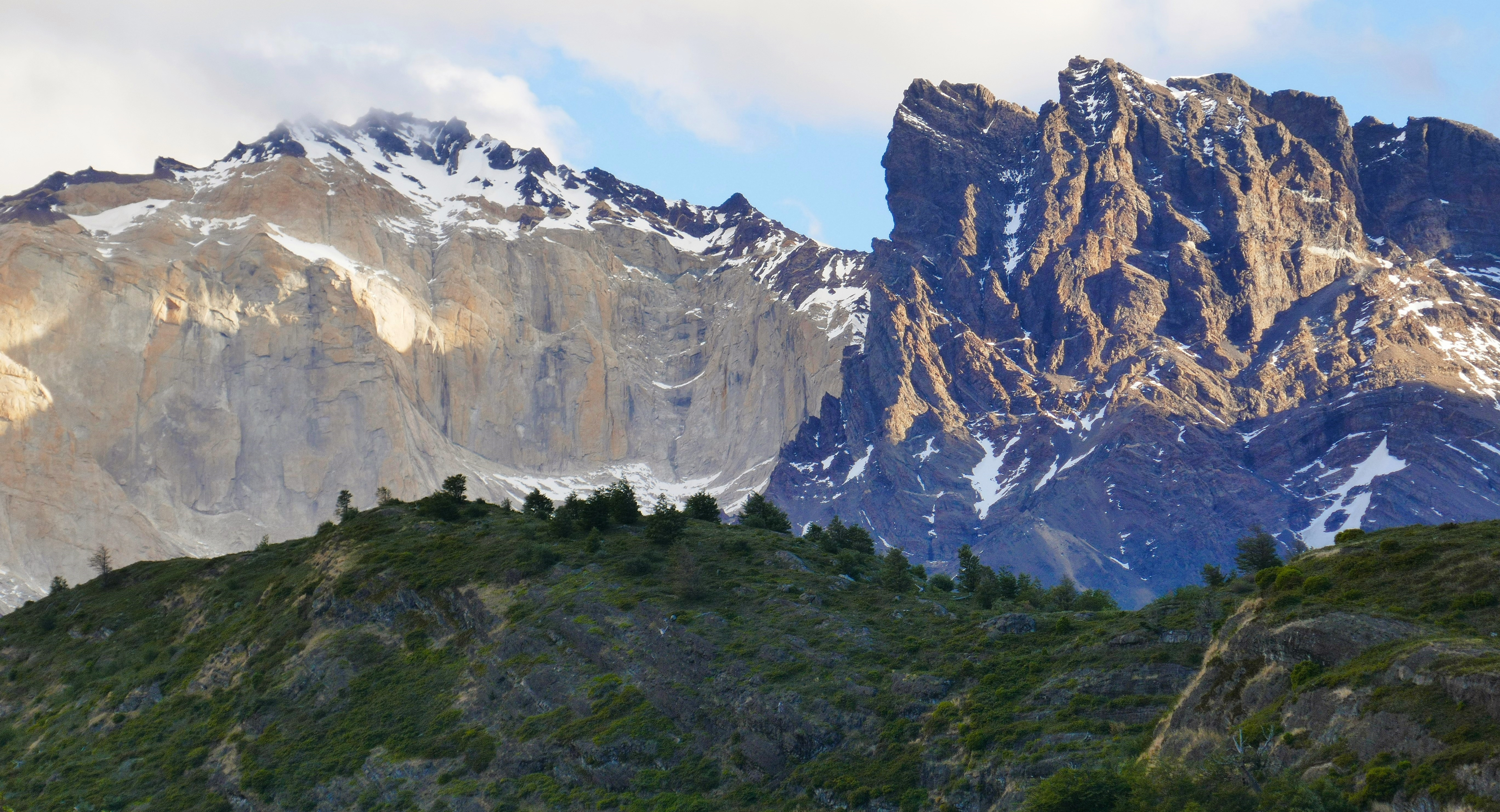
North aspects of Cerro Escudo (left) and Cerro Cabeza de Indio to right

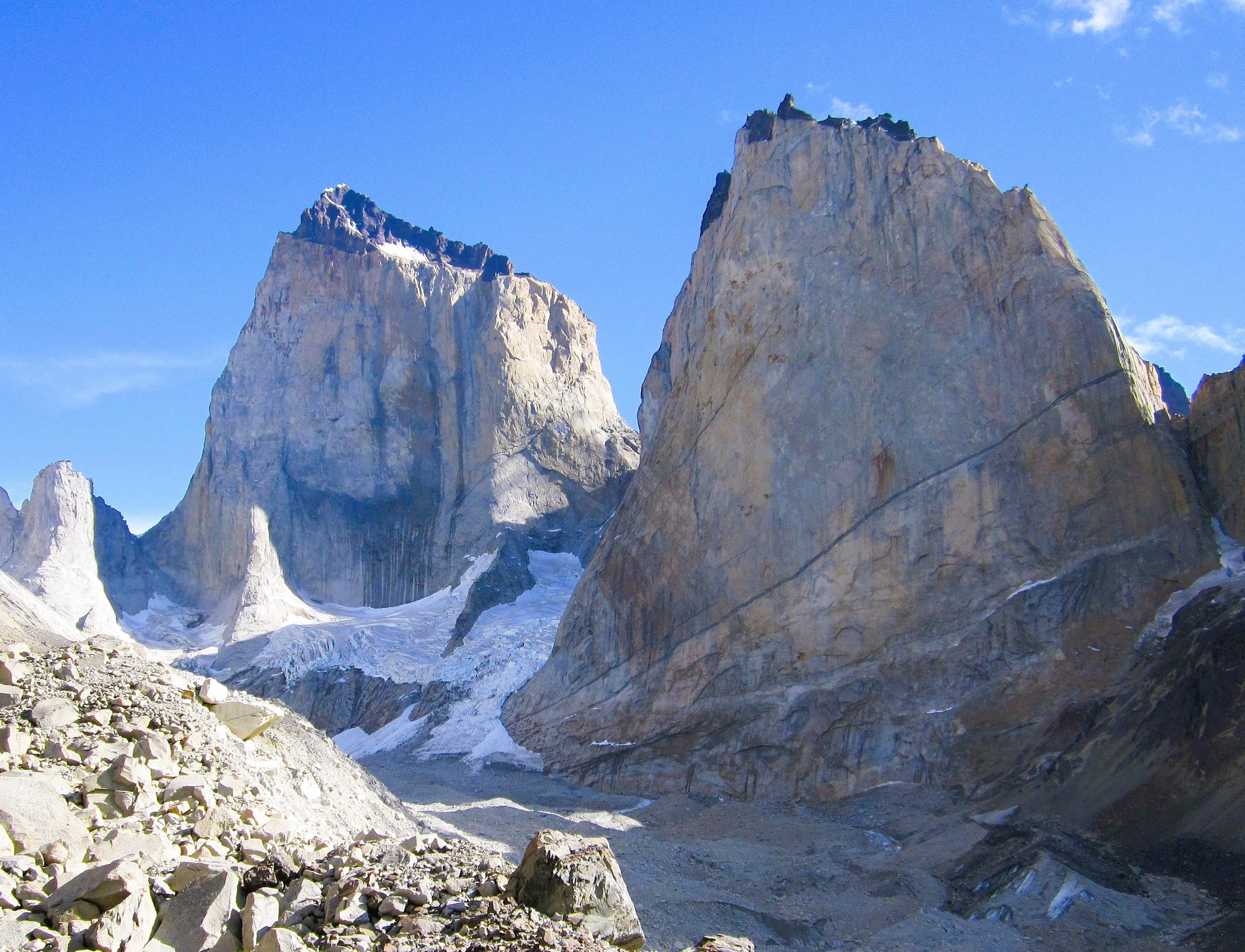
Cerro Fortaleza (left) and Cerro Escudo (right) viewed from the northeast in Valle del Silencio (Valley of Silence)

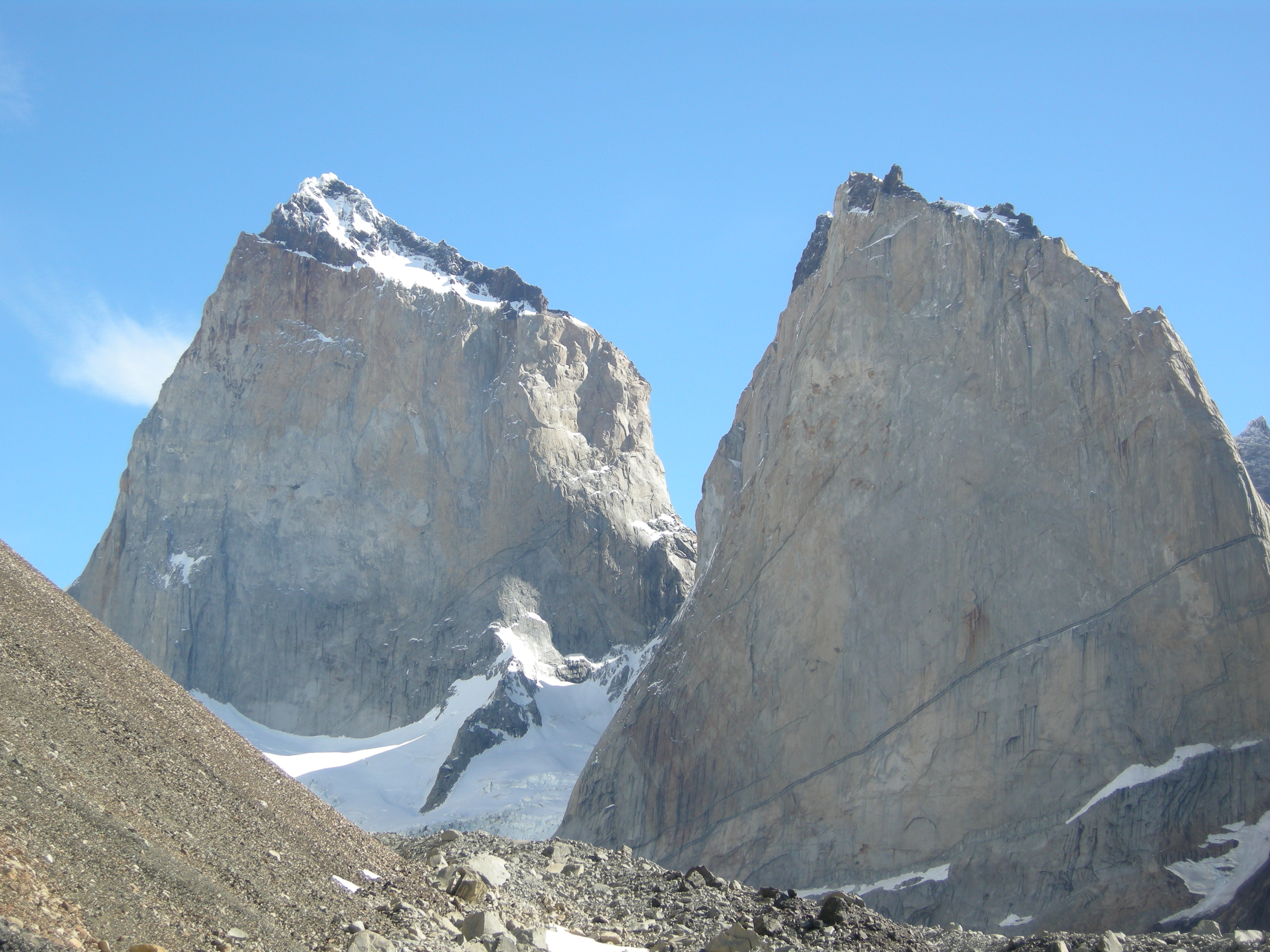
Cerro Fortaleza (left) and Cerro Escudo (right) from the Valle del Silencio

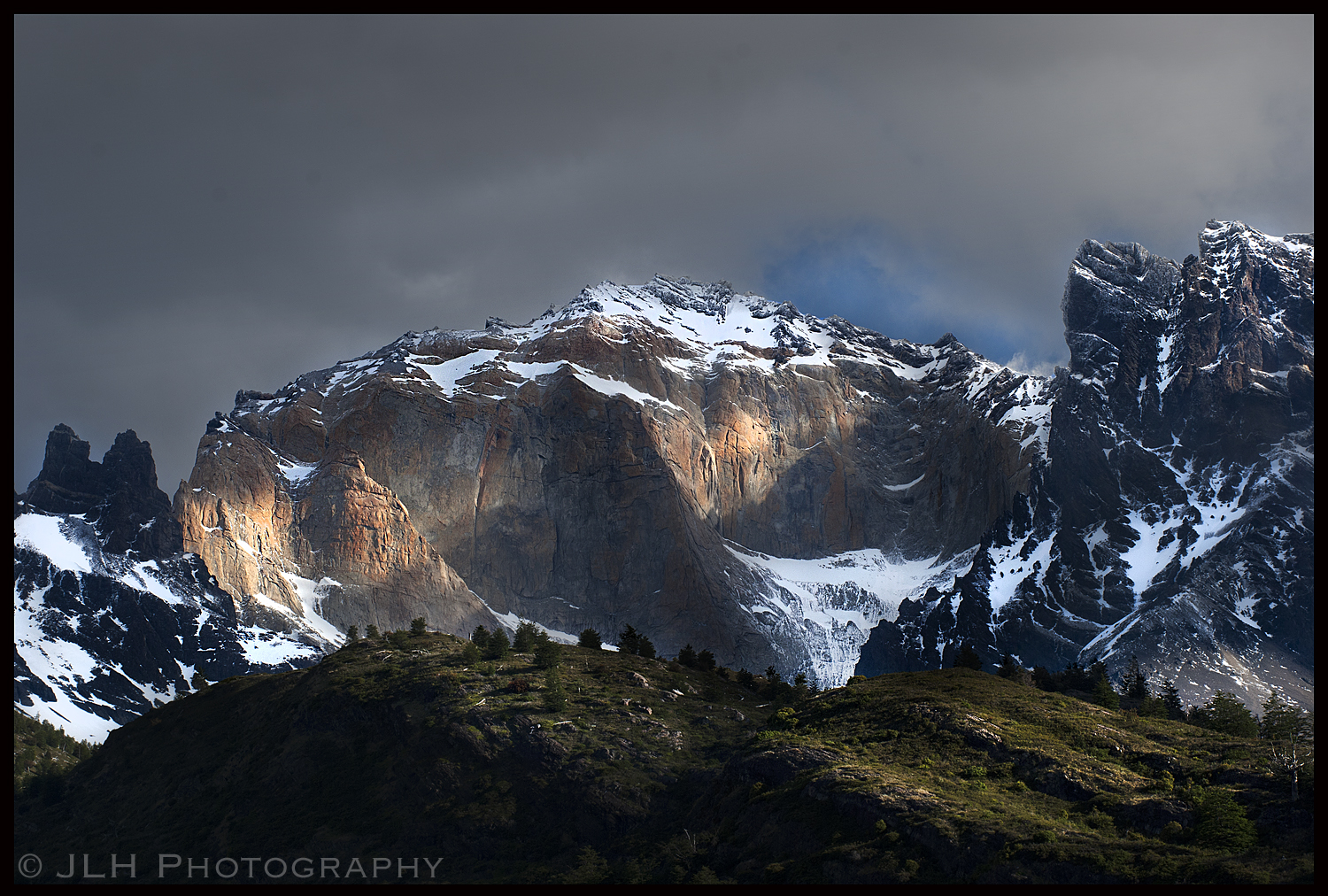
North aspect

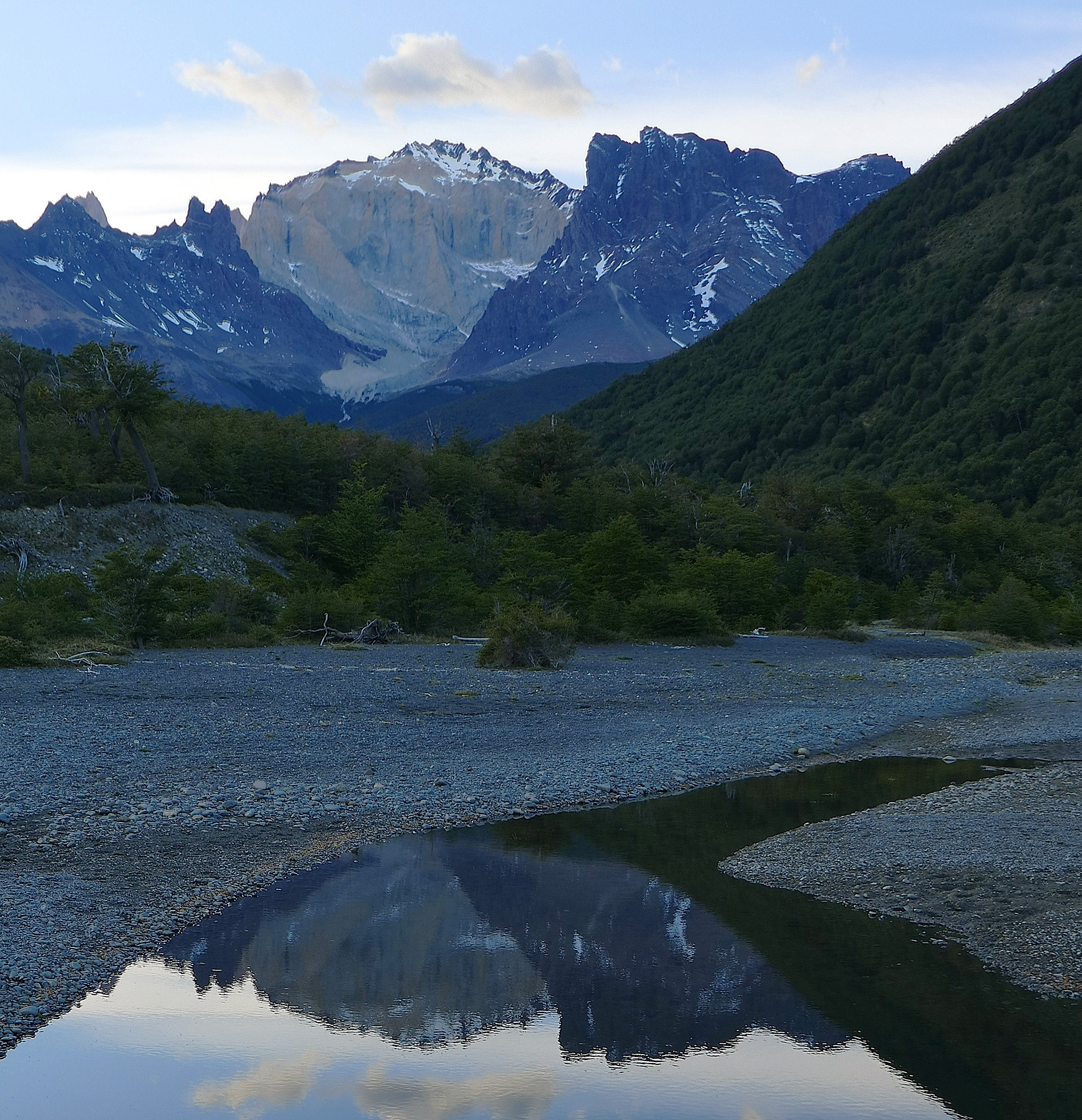
North aspects of Cerro Escudo to left and Cerro Cabeza de Indio to right as seen from Lake Dickson area

== See also ==
- Patagonia
