= Cerro Trono Blanco =

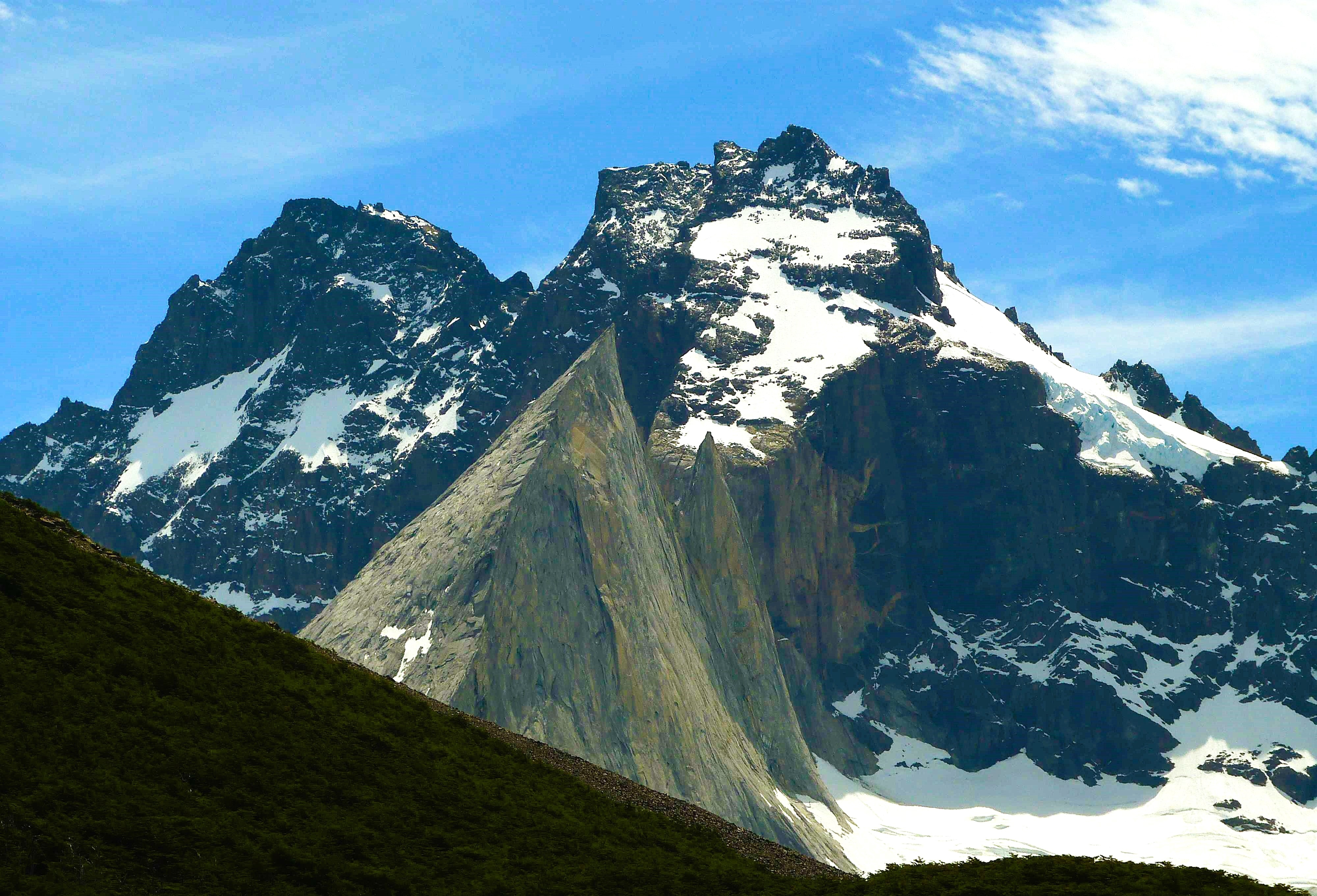
- South aspect Aleta de Tiburón (Shark Fin) in front

Highest point
- Elevation: 2,197 m (7,208 ft)
- Prominence: 586 m (1,923 ft)
- Isolation: 2.736 km (1.700 mi)
- Coordinates: 50°57′05″S 73°05′08″W

Naming
- Etymology: White Throne

Geography
- Location within Chile Location within South America Location within Southern Patagonia
- Interactive map of Cerro Trono Blanco
- Country: Chile
- Province: Última Esperanza Province
- Protected area: Torres del Paine National Park
- Parent range: Andes; Cordillera Paine
- Topo map: IGM Paine (Hoja Paine)

Geology
- Rock age: Miocene
- Rock type(s): Granite, Schist

Climbing
- First ascent: 1968

Cerro Trono Blanco is a mountain in the Magallanes Region of Chile.

== Description ==
Cerro Trono Blanco is a 2,197-meter-elevation (7,208-foot) summit in the Cordillera Paine group of the Andes. The peak is located 100 kilometers (62 miles) north-northwest of Puerto Natales. The peak is situated at the head of Valle del Francés (French Valley) within Torres del Paine National Park. Precipitation runoff from the peak's slopes drains north to Dickson Lake and south to Nordenskjöld Lake which are both part of the Paine River watershed. Topographic relief is significant as the summit rises 1,260 meters (4,134 feet) above French Valley in 1.5 kilometers (0.93 mile), and 1,650 meters (5,413 feet) above Laguna Los Perros (Dogs Lake) in three kilometers (1.86 miles). The peak's descriptive Spanish toponym translates as "White Throne." The nearest higher peak is Cerro Cabeza de Indio, 2.7 kilometers (1.7 miles) to the east.

== Climbing history ==
The first ascent of the summit was accomplished in 1968 by Czechoslovak mountaineers Leoš Horka and Pavel Klimsza along with Chilean Gastón Oyarzún, then the second ascent was made in 1979 by C. Gálvez, G. Casassa, and J. Lanas. In February 2007, Julien Dussere, Jehan-Roland Guillot, Rémi Vignon, and Frederic Salle established a new route on the south face that they named Hoja de Rosa. On December 6, 2024, Sebastian Pelletti and Hernan Rodriguez made the first ascent of Ultima Ronda on the south face.

== Cerro Aleta de Tiburón ==
The south ridge of Trono Blanco features a distinctive granite arête called Aleta de Tiburón which translates as Shark Fin. The elevation is 1,717 meters (5,633 ft). It was first climbed in January 1978 by Gino Cassasa, Claude Cognian, Juan Pardo, and Gonzalo Salamanca. The south ridge was first climbed by Gibert Bonneville, Miguel Ignat, and Denis Ravaine in January 1982. The southwest face was first climbed by Norm Larson, Patrick Lind, Magnus Nilson, and Lorna Corson in February 1992. The northwest face was first climbed by Charlie Fowler, Peter Appel, and Sarah Wood in January 1995.

== Climate ==
Based on the Köppen climate classification, Cerro Trono Blanco is located in a tundra climate zone with long, cold winters, and short, cool summers. Weather systems are forced upward by the mountains (orographic lift), causing moisture to drop in the form of rain and snow. This climate supports small unnamed glaciers on the north and south slopes. The months of December through February offer the most favorable weather for visiting or climbing in this area, however the region is characterized by low temperatures and strong winds throughout the year.

== Geology ==
The peak is composed of granite underlain by gray gabbro-diorite laccolith and the sedimentary rocks it intrudes, deeply eroded by glaciers. The hot granite that intruded parallel to the sedimentary rock converted the mudstone and sandstone into a dark metamorphic rock. The steep, light colored faces are eroded from the tougher, vertically jointed granitic rocks, while the foothills and dark cap rocks are the sedimentary country rock, in this case flysch deposited in the Cretaceous and later folded.

The radiometric age for the quartz diorite is 12 ± 2 million years by the rubidium-strontium method and 13 ± 1 million years by the potassium-argon method. More precise ages of 12.59 ± 0.02 and 12.50 ± 0.02 million years for the earliest and latest identified phases of the intrusion, respectively, were achieved using Uranium–lead dating methods on single zircon crystals. Basal gabbro and diorite were dated by a similar technique to 12.472 ± 0.009 to 12.431 ± 0.006 million years. Thus, magma was intruded and crystallized over 162 ± 11 thousand years.

== Gallery ==
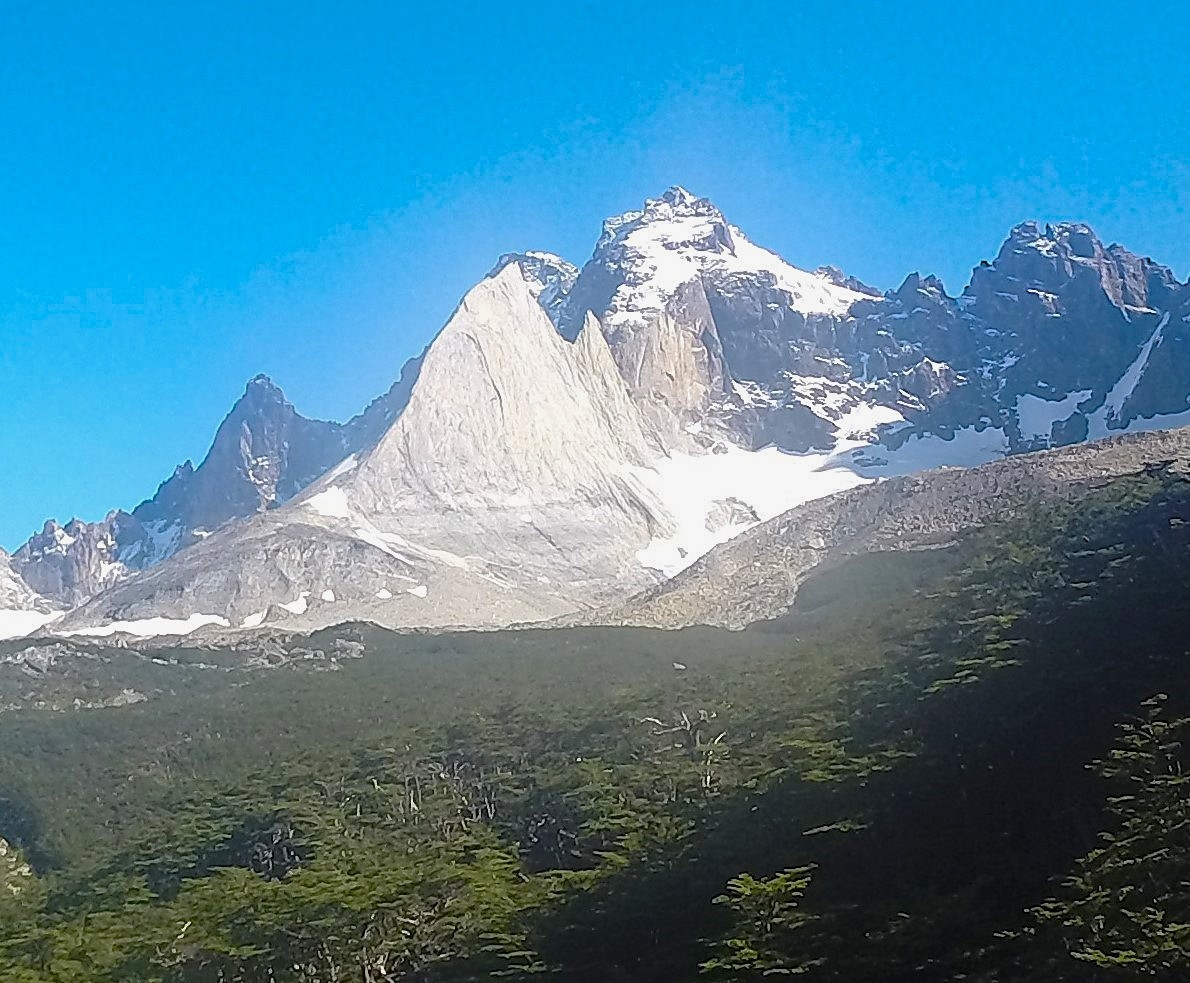
Southeast aspect

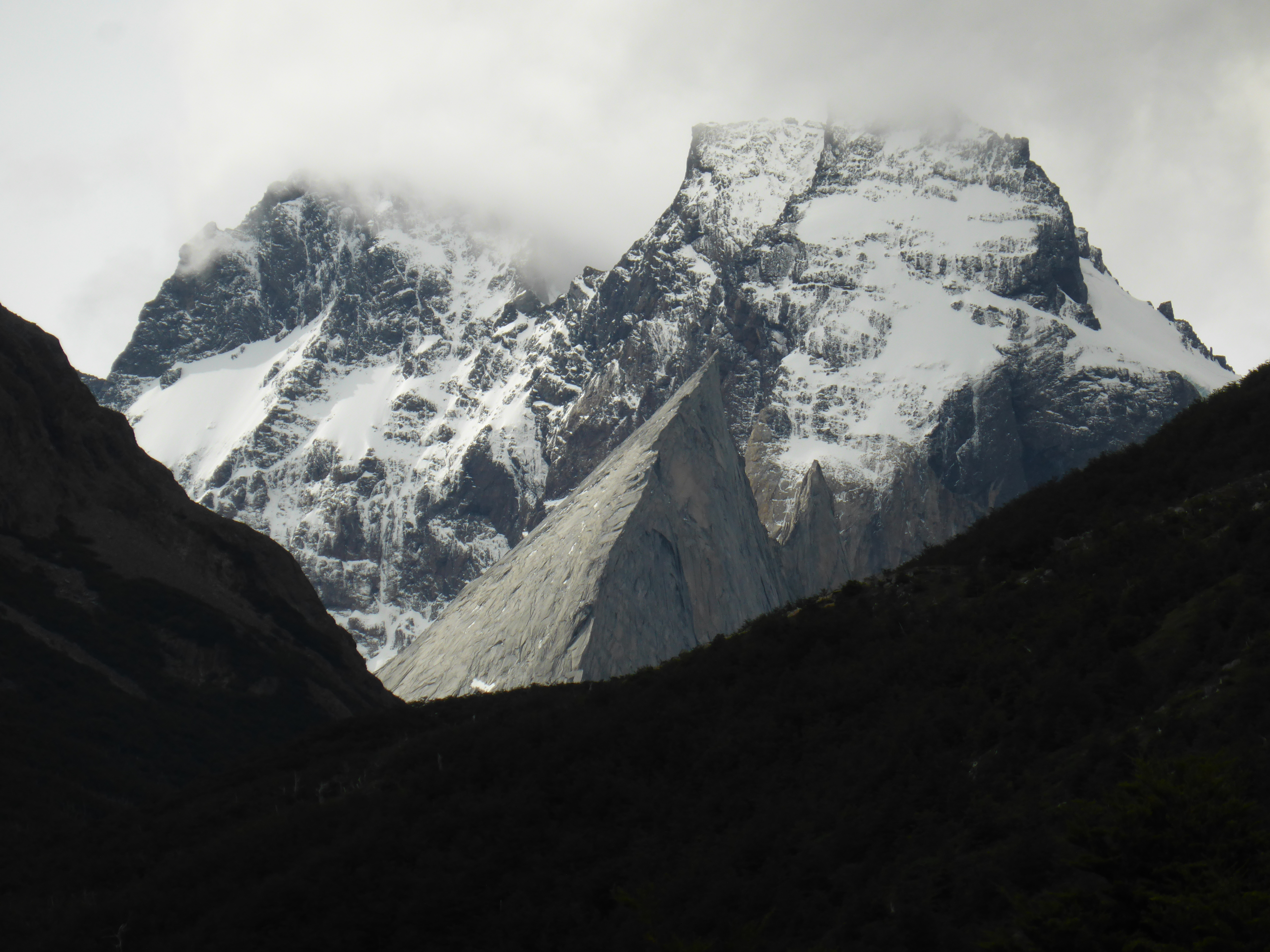
Trono Blanco behind Aleta de Tiburón (Shark Fin)

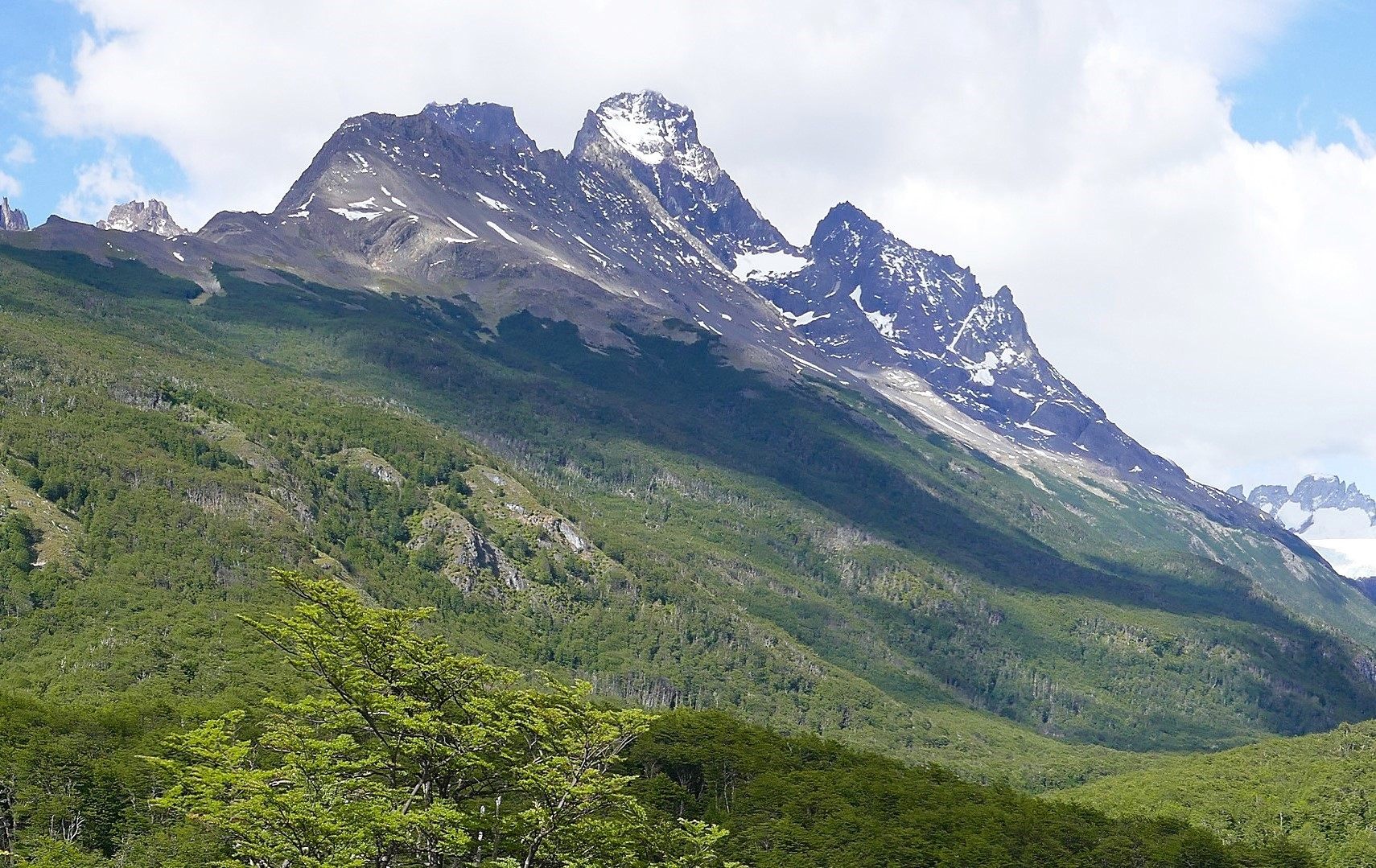
Northeast aspect of Cerro Trono Blanco

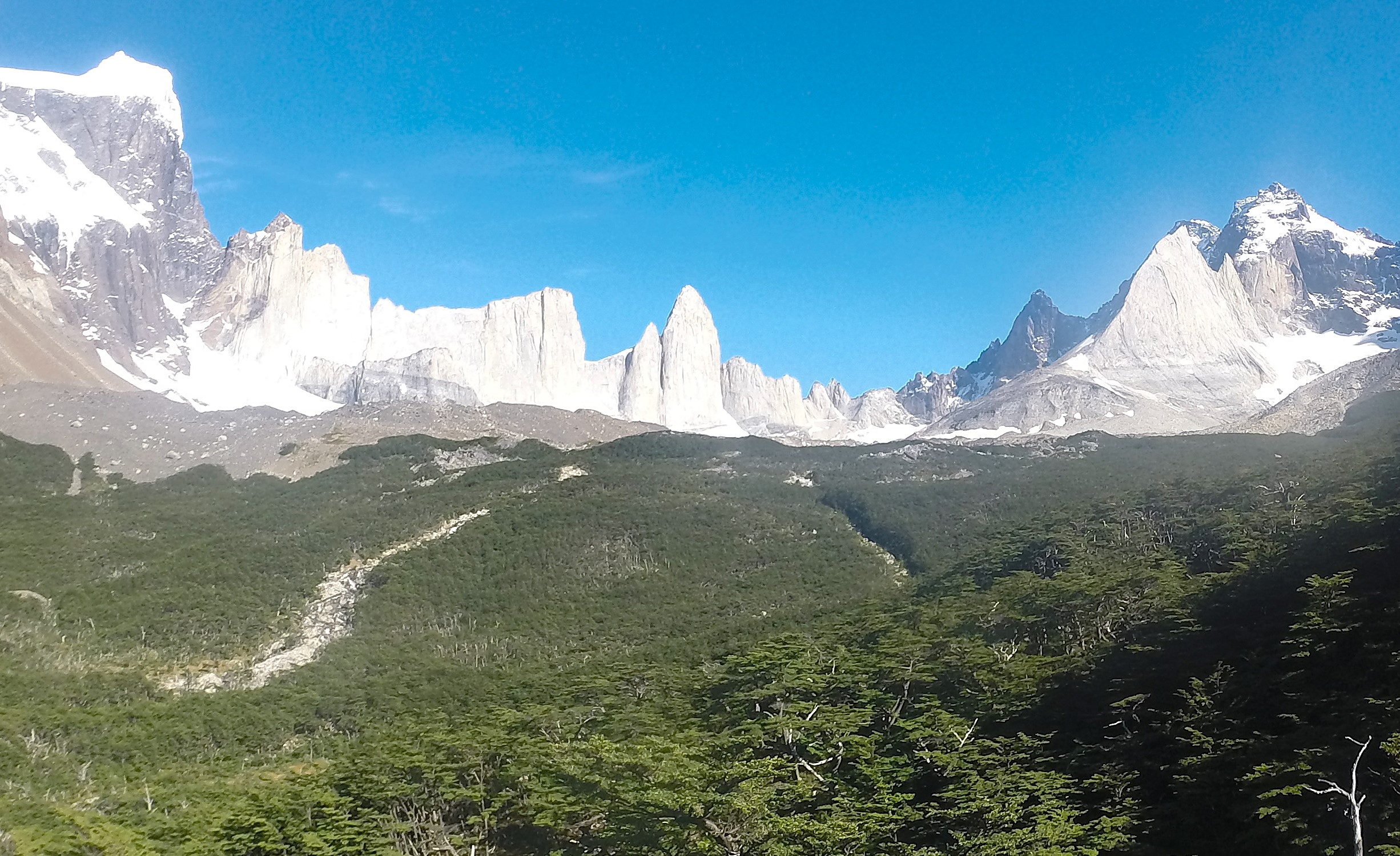
French Valley with Cerro Catedral centered and Cerro Trono Blanco to right.

== See also ==
- Patagonia
