= Military Geographic Institute =

Military Geographic Institute may refer to:

- Military Geographic Institute (Chile), agency serving as the official, technical, and permanent government body responsible for geographic and cartographic matters in Chile
- Military Geographic Institute (Italy), is the national mapping agency for Italy.
