= La Espada =

Mountain in Chile

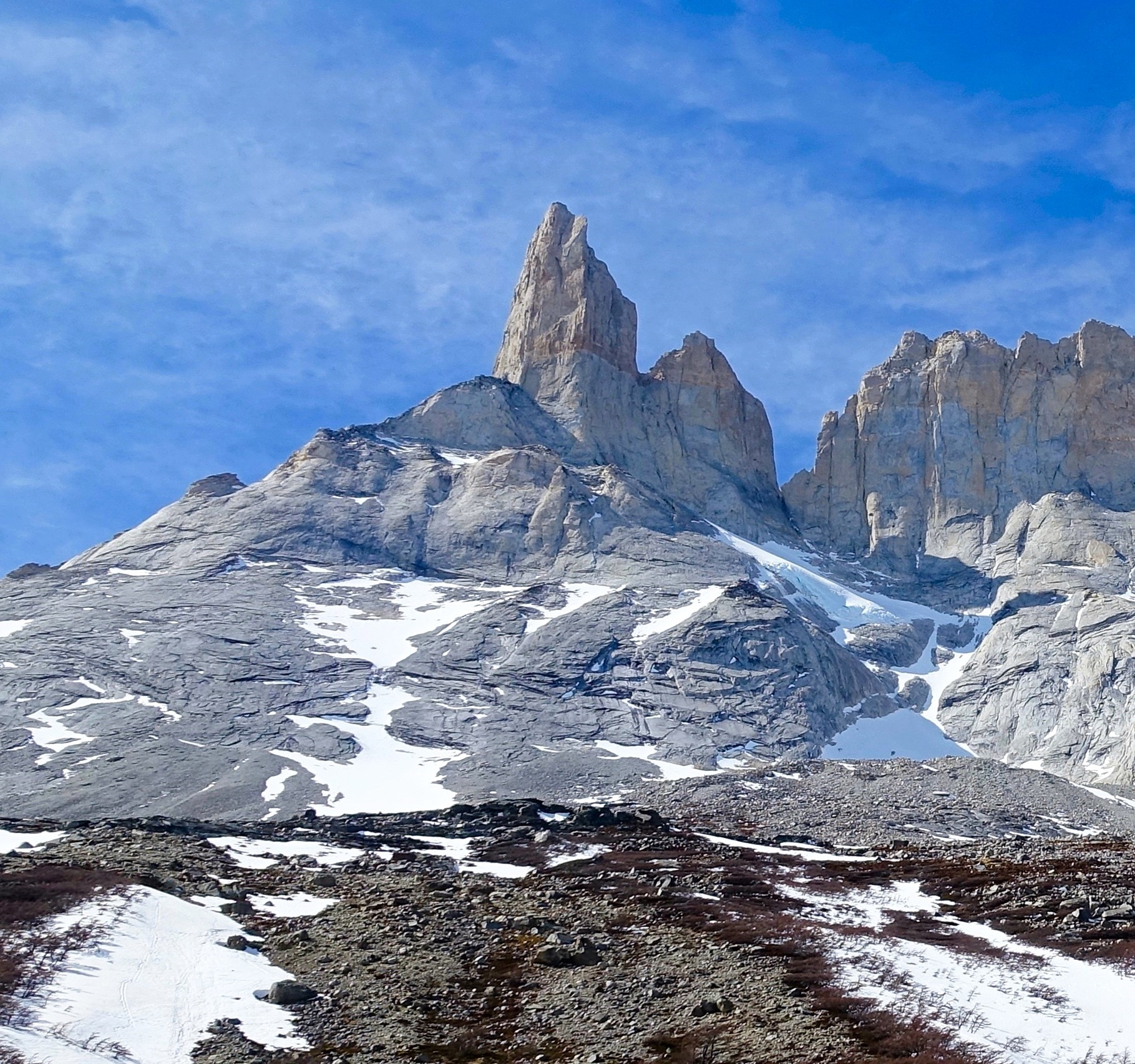
- West aspect

Highest point
- Elevation: 2,500 m (8,202 ft)
- Coordinates: 50°58′39″S 73°01′31″W

Naming
- Etymology: The Sword

Geography
- Location within Chile Location within South America Location within Southern Patagonia
- Interactive map of La Espada
- Country: Chile
- Province: Última Esperanza Province
- Protected area: Torres del Paine National Park
- Parent range: Andes; Cordillera Paine
- Topo map: IGM 1:50,000 Paine (Hoja Paine)

Geology
- Rock age: Miocene
- Rock type: Granite

Climbing
- First ascent: December 19, 1971

La Espada is a mountain in the Magallanes Region of Chile.

== Description ==
La Espada, also known as Cerro Espada, is a 2,500-meter-elevation (8,202-foot) summit in the Cordillera Paine group of the Andes. The peak is located 100 kilometers (62 miles) north-northwest of Puerto Natales, and the peak is within Torres del Paine National Park. Precipitation runoff from the peak's slopes drains to Nordenskjöld Lake which is part of the Paine River watershed. Topographic relief is significant as the summit rises 1,800 meters (6,168 feet) above Valle del Francés (French Valley) in two kilometers (1.24 miles), and 1,250 meters (4,100 feet) above the Bader Valley in one kilometer (0.6 mile). The peak's Spanish toponym translates as "The Sword."

== Climbing history ==
The first ascent of the summit was accomplished on December 19, 1971, by Paul Fatti and Michael Scott via the west face, followed by Tony Dick, Carl Fatti, Roger Fuggle, Richard Hoare on the following day. This South African expedition also made the first ascent of Cuerno Norte a few days later.

The first ascent of the 900-meter east face of The Sword was made in 2000 by Russel Mitrovich, Jimmy Haden, and Sean Leary via a route they named Under the Knife.

Another new route on the east face named Arma de Doble Filo (Double-edged sword) (class 5.11) was first climbed in February 2024 by Sebastian Pelletti and Hernán Rodriguez.

== Climate ==
Based on the Köppen climate classification, La Espada is located in a tundra climate zone with long, cold winters, and short, cool summers. Weather systems are forced upward by the mountains (orographic lift), causing moisture to drop in the form of rain and snow. The months of December through February offer the most favorable weather for visiting or climbing in this area, however the region is characterized by low temperatures and strong winds throughout the year.

== Geology ==
The peak is composed of granite underlain by gray gabbro-diorite laccolith and the sedimentary rocks it intrudes, deeply eroded by glaciers. The hot granite that intruded parallel to the sedimentary rock converted the mudstone and sandstone into a dark metamorphic rock. The steep, light colored faces are eroded from the tougher, vertically jointed granitic rocks, while the foothills and dark cap rocks are the sedimentary country rock, in this case flysch deposited in the Cretaceous and later folded.

The radiometric age for the quartz diorite is 12 ± 2 million years by the rubidium-strontium method and 13 ± 1 million years by the potassium-argon method. More precise ages of 12.59 ± 0.02 and 12.50 ± 0.02 million years for the earliest and latest identified phases of the intrusion, respectively, were achieved using Uranium–lead dating methods on single zircon crystals. Basal gabbro and diorite were dated by a similar technique to 12.472 ± 0.009 to 12.431 ± 0.006 million years. Thus, magma was intruded and crystallized over 162 ± 11 thousand years.

== Gallery ==
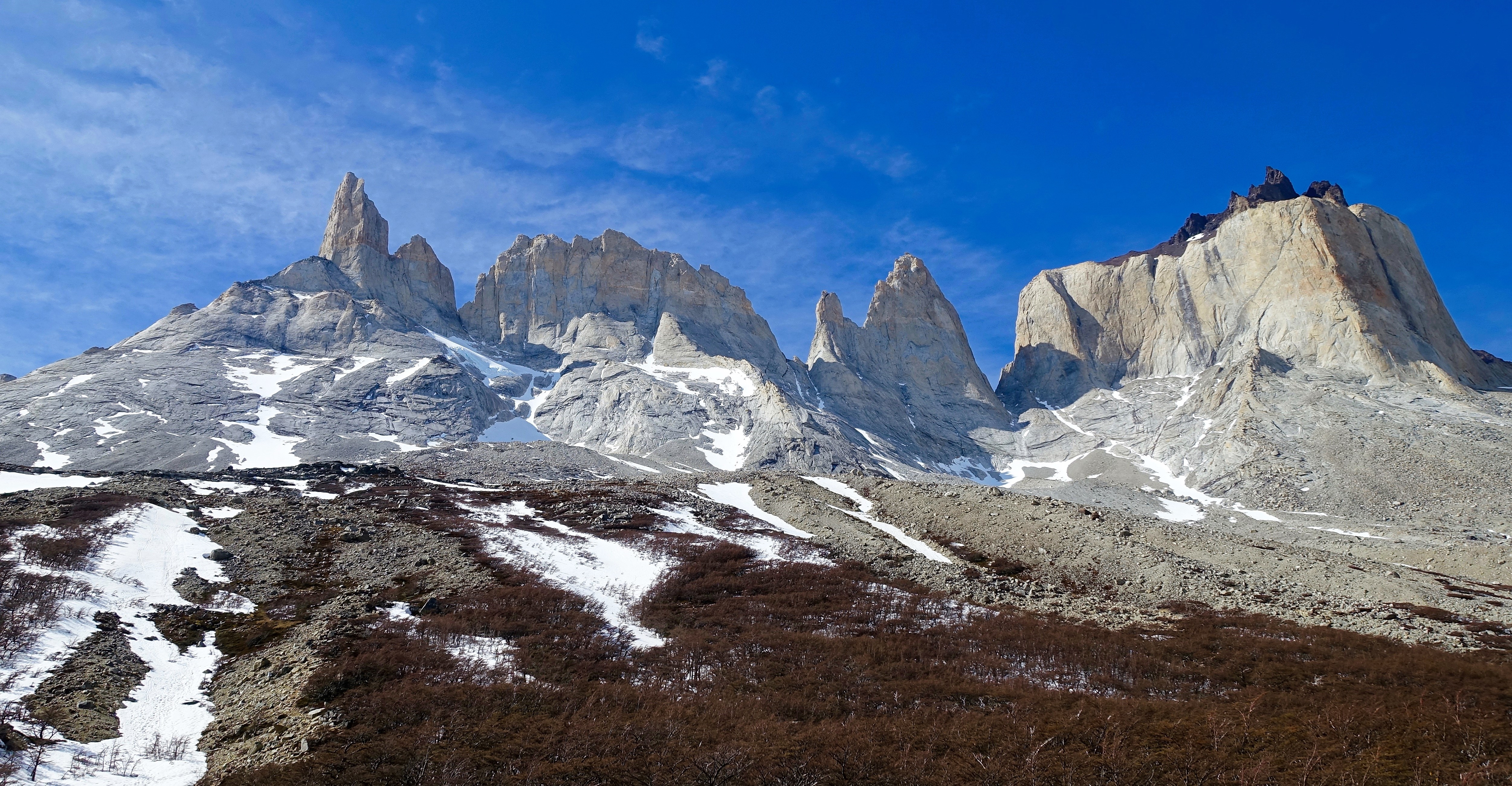
Left to rightːCerro Espada, Cerro Hoja, Cerro Mascara, Cuerno Norte.
Viewed from the west in French Valley.

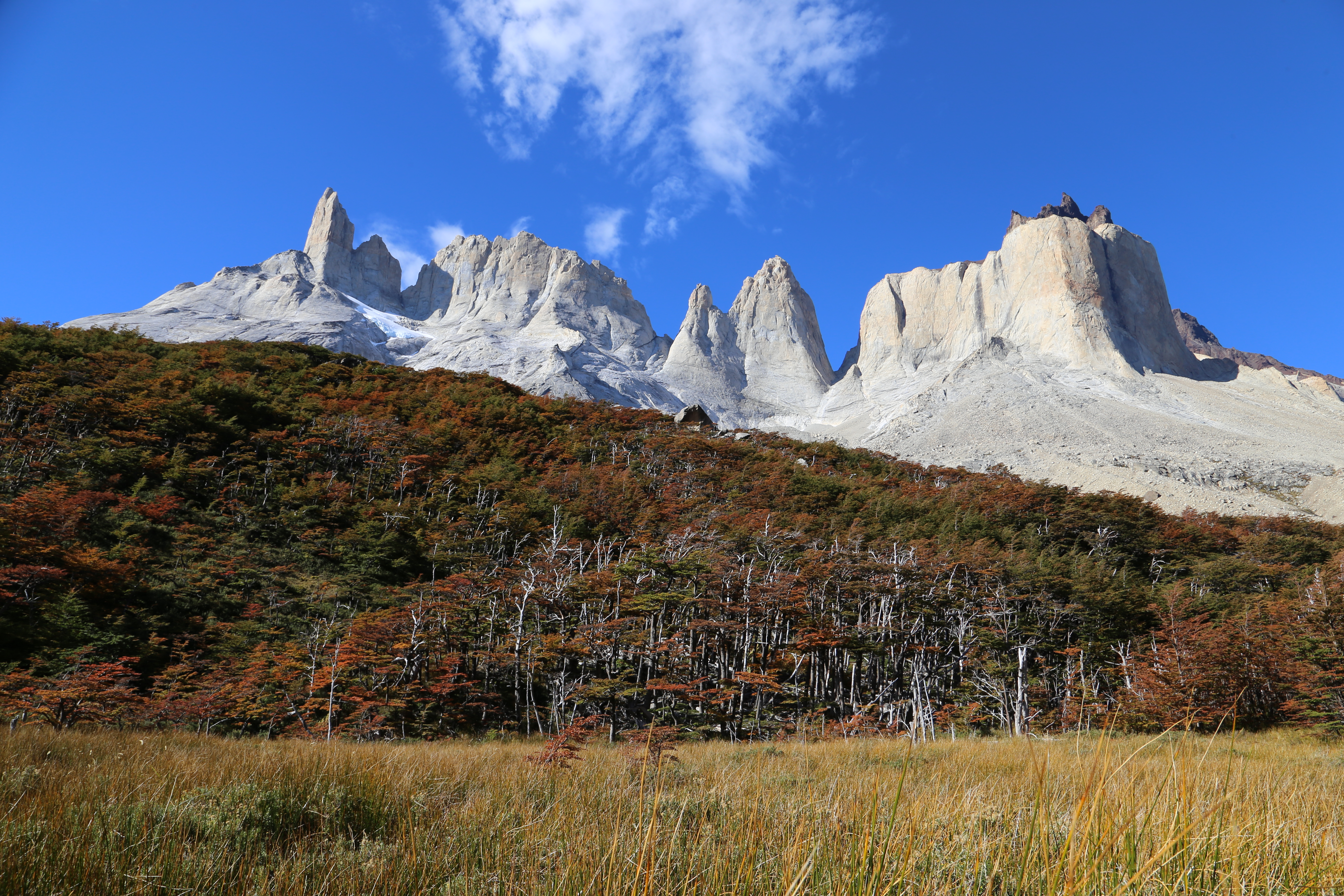
Cerro Espada, Cerro Hoja, Cerro Mascara, Cuerno Norte.
Viewed from the west in French Valley.

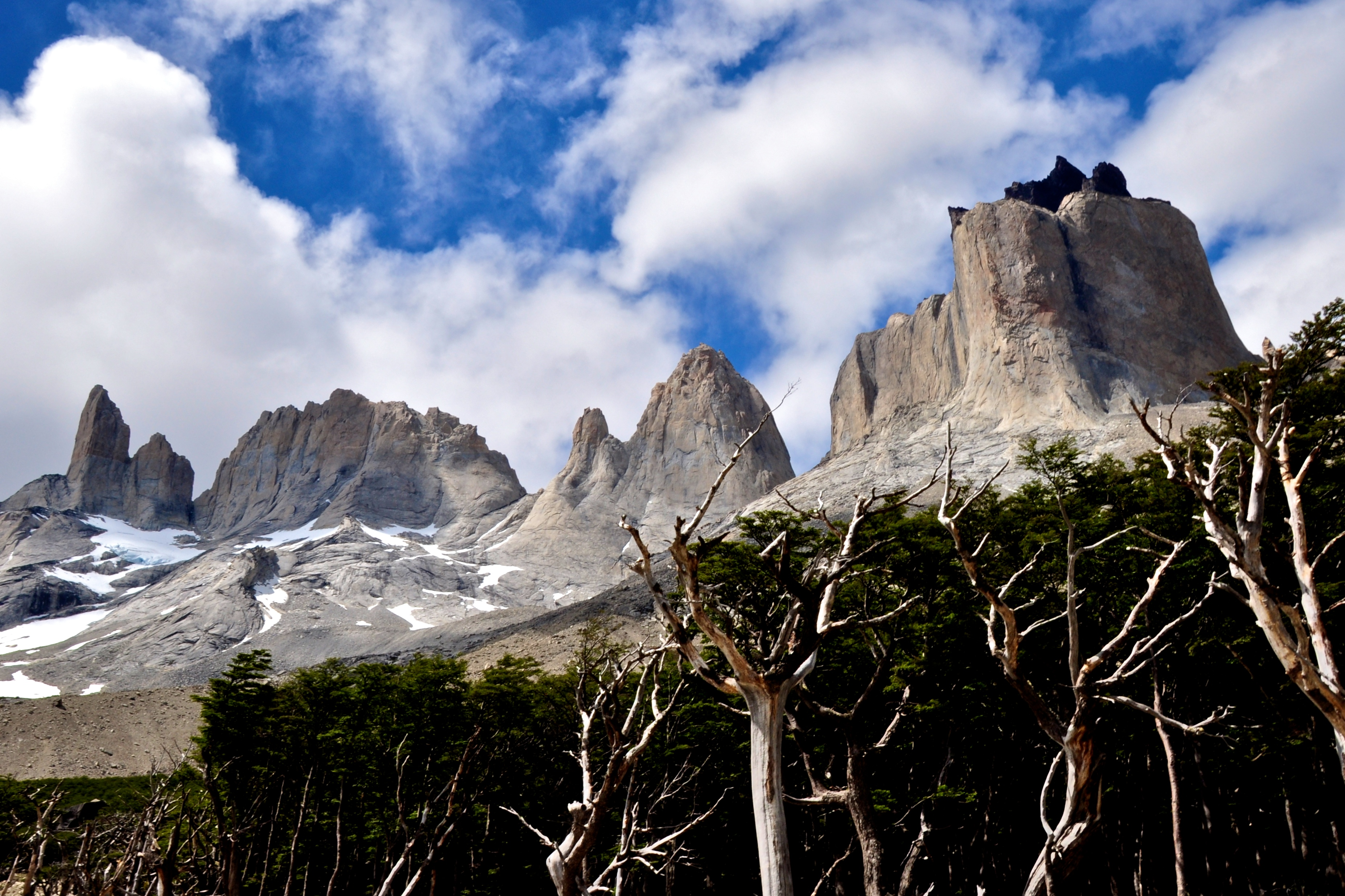
Cerro Espada, Cerro Hoja, Cerro Mascara, Cuerno Norte

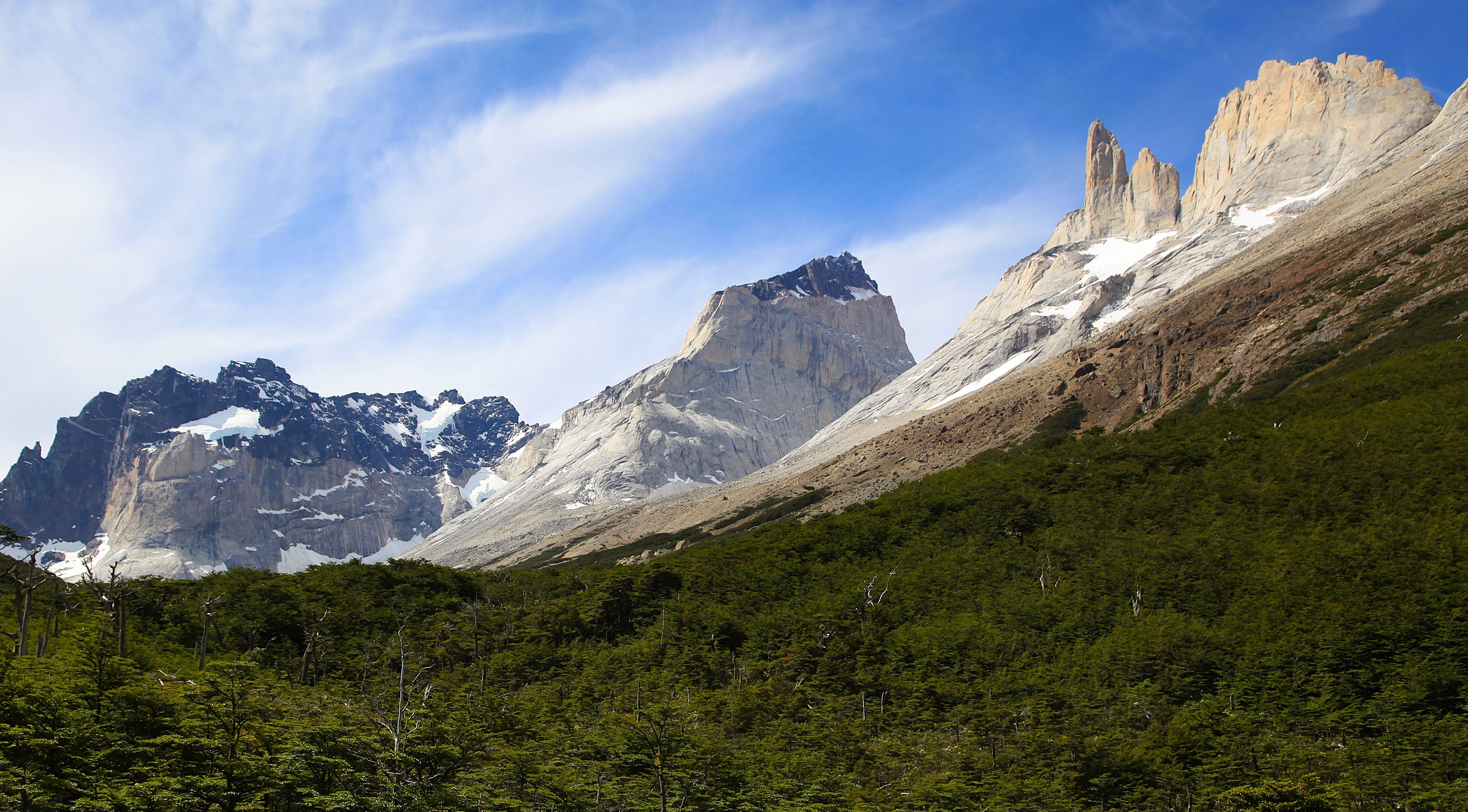
Left to rightːCerro Cabeza de Indio, Cerro Fortaleza, La Espada, La Hoja

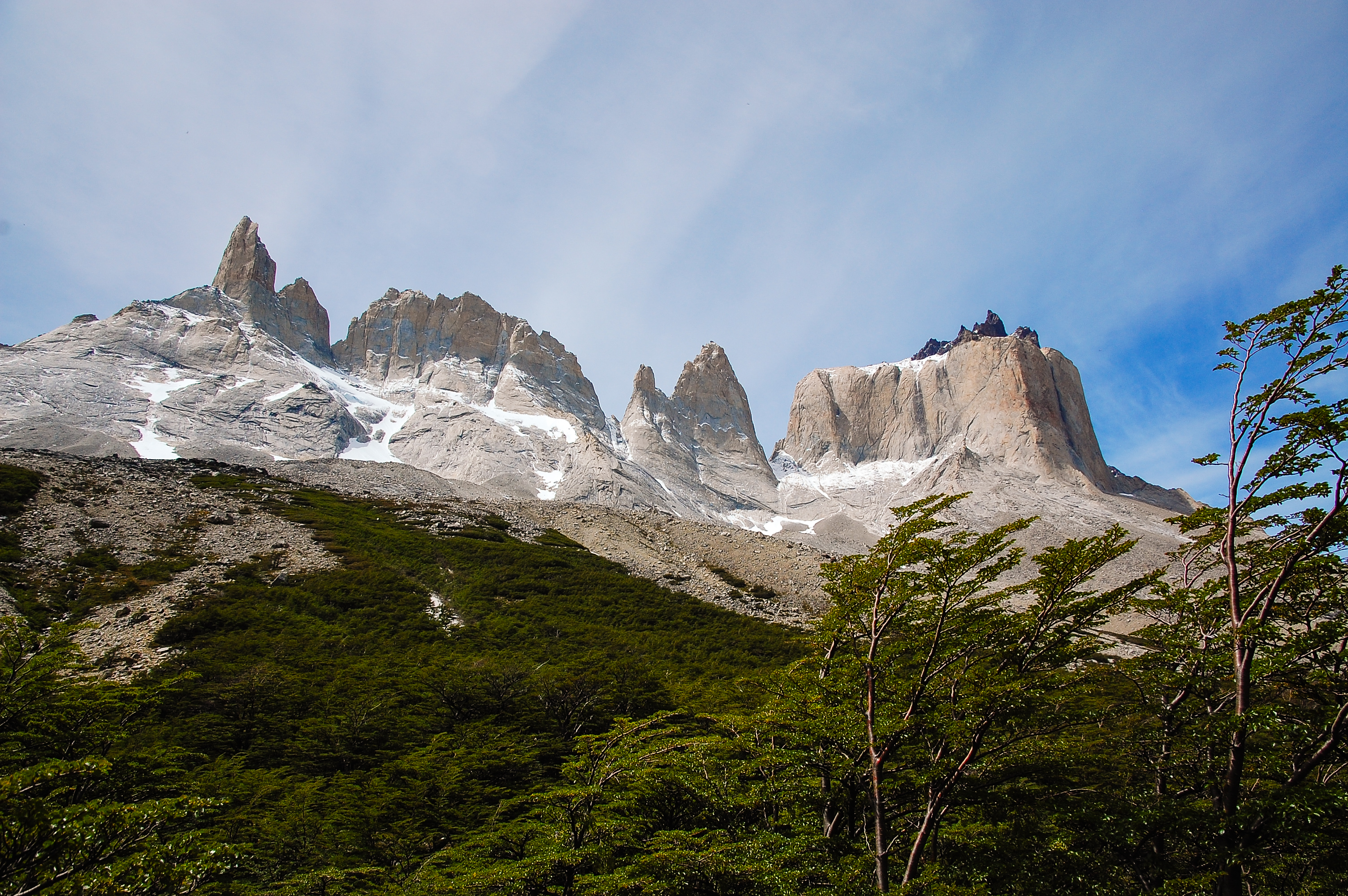
Cerro Espada, Cerro Hoja, Cerro Mascara, Cuerno Norte

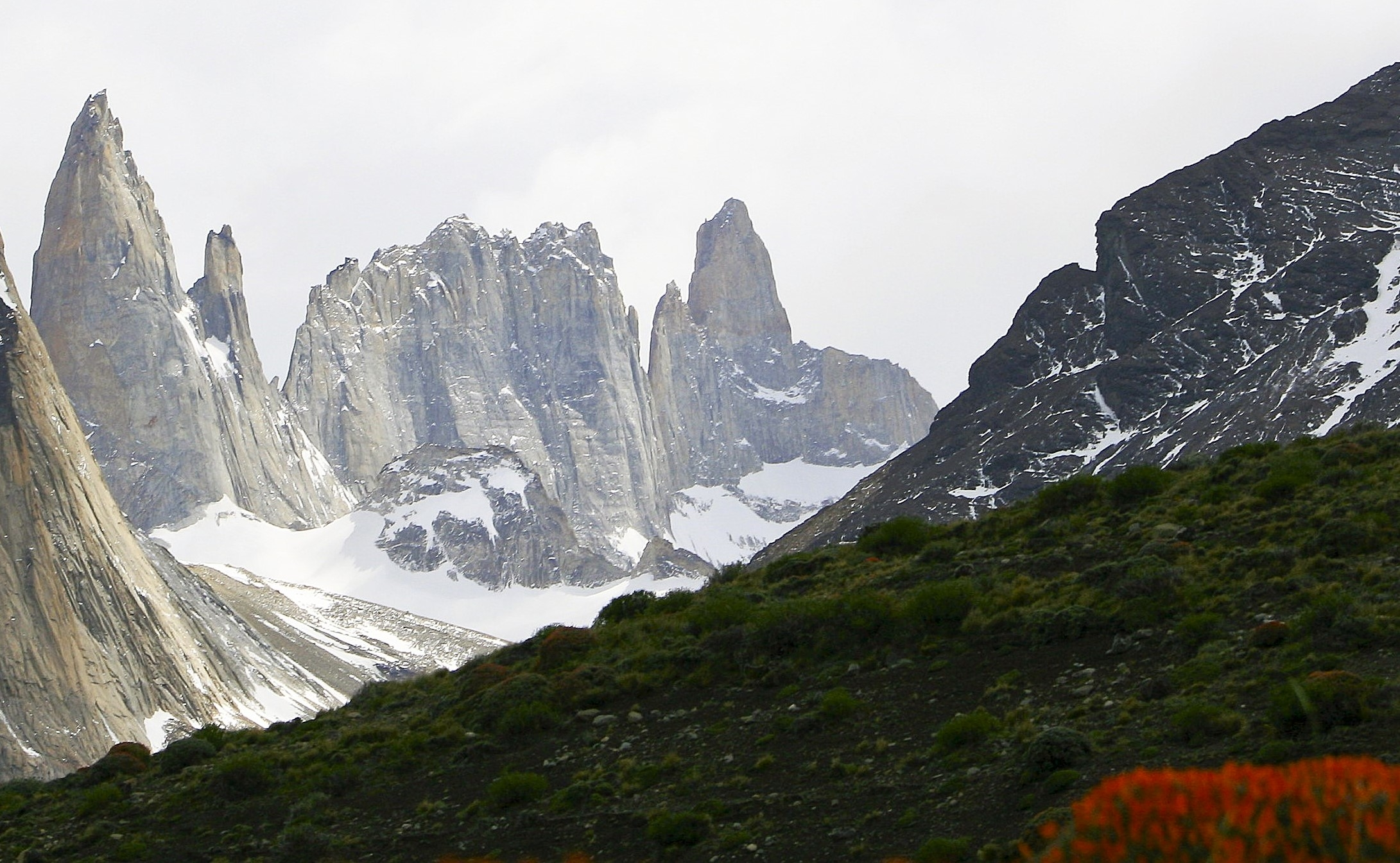
Cerro Mascara (left), Cerro Hoja, and La Espada
View from southeast, looking through Bader Valley

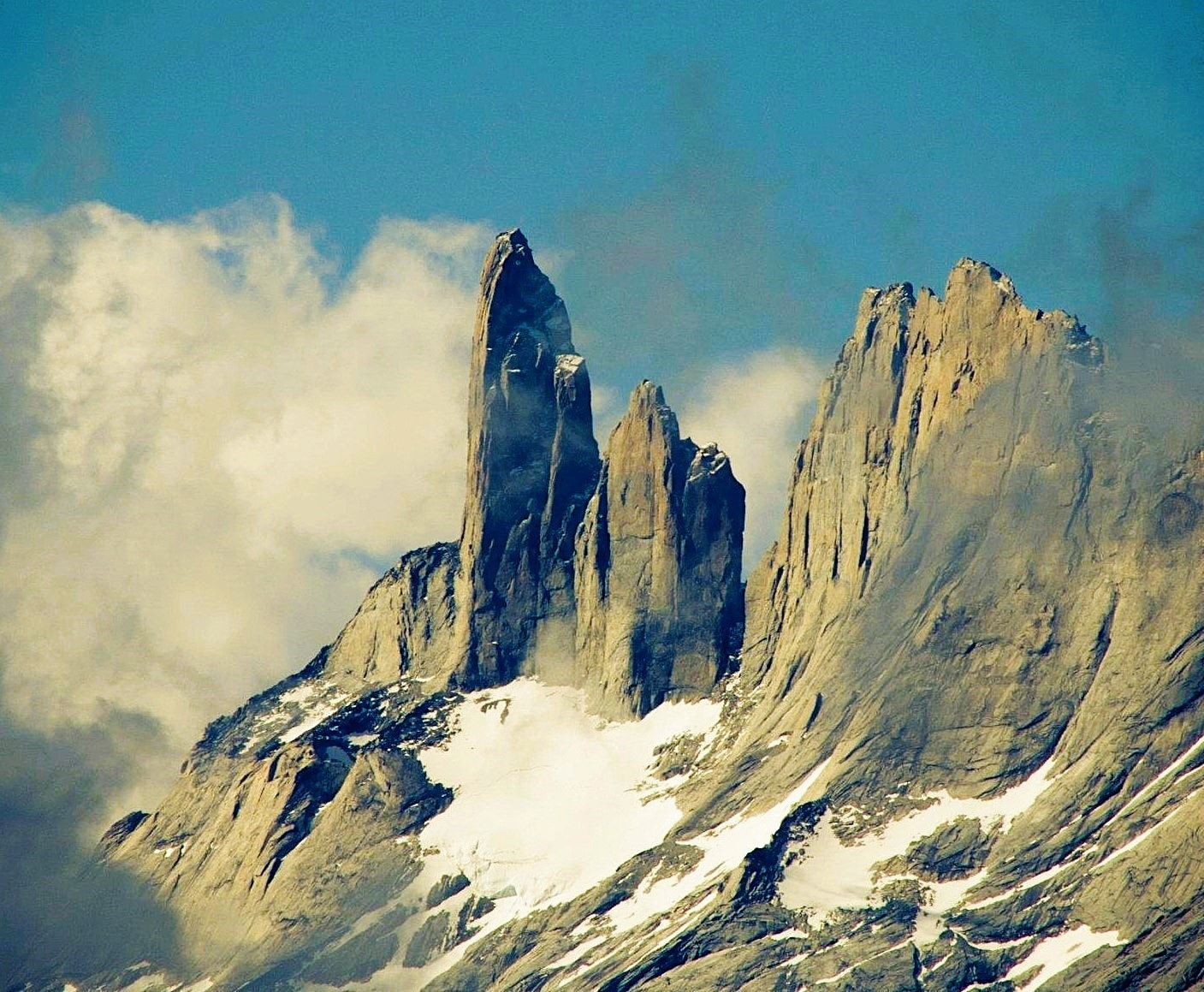
Southwest aspect

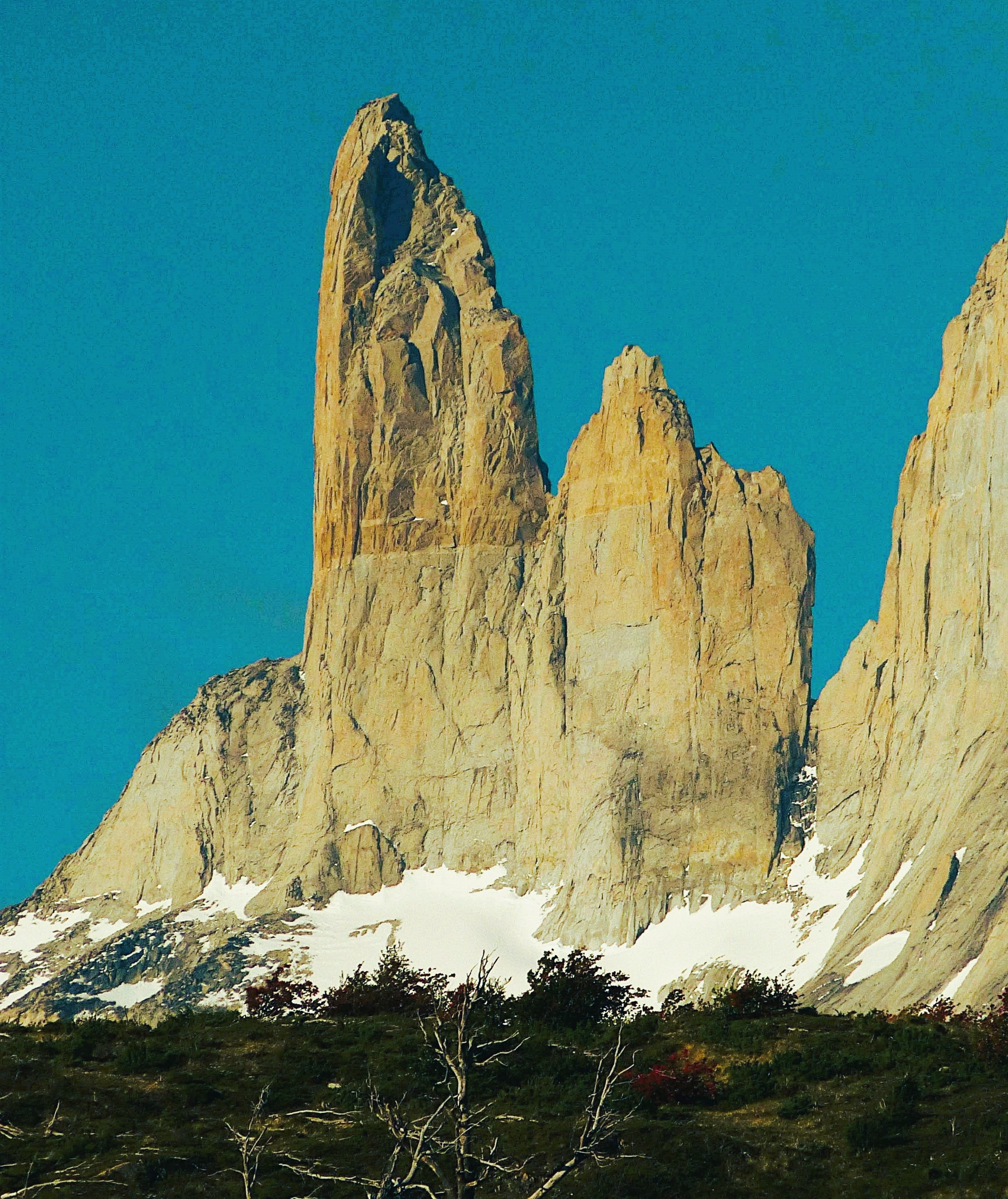
Southwest aspect

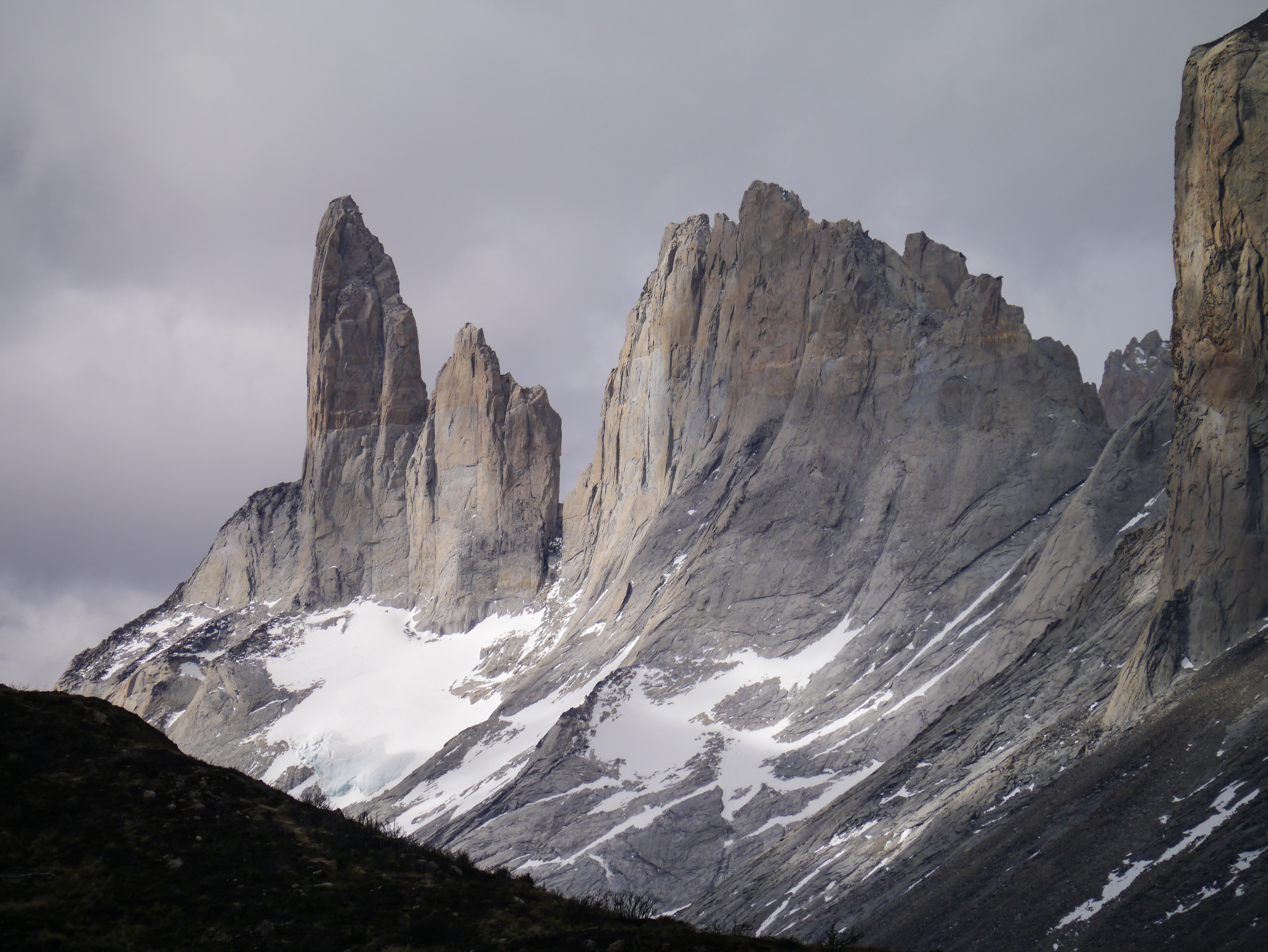
Cerro Espada (left) and Cerro Hoja

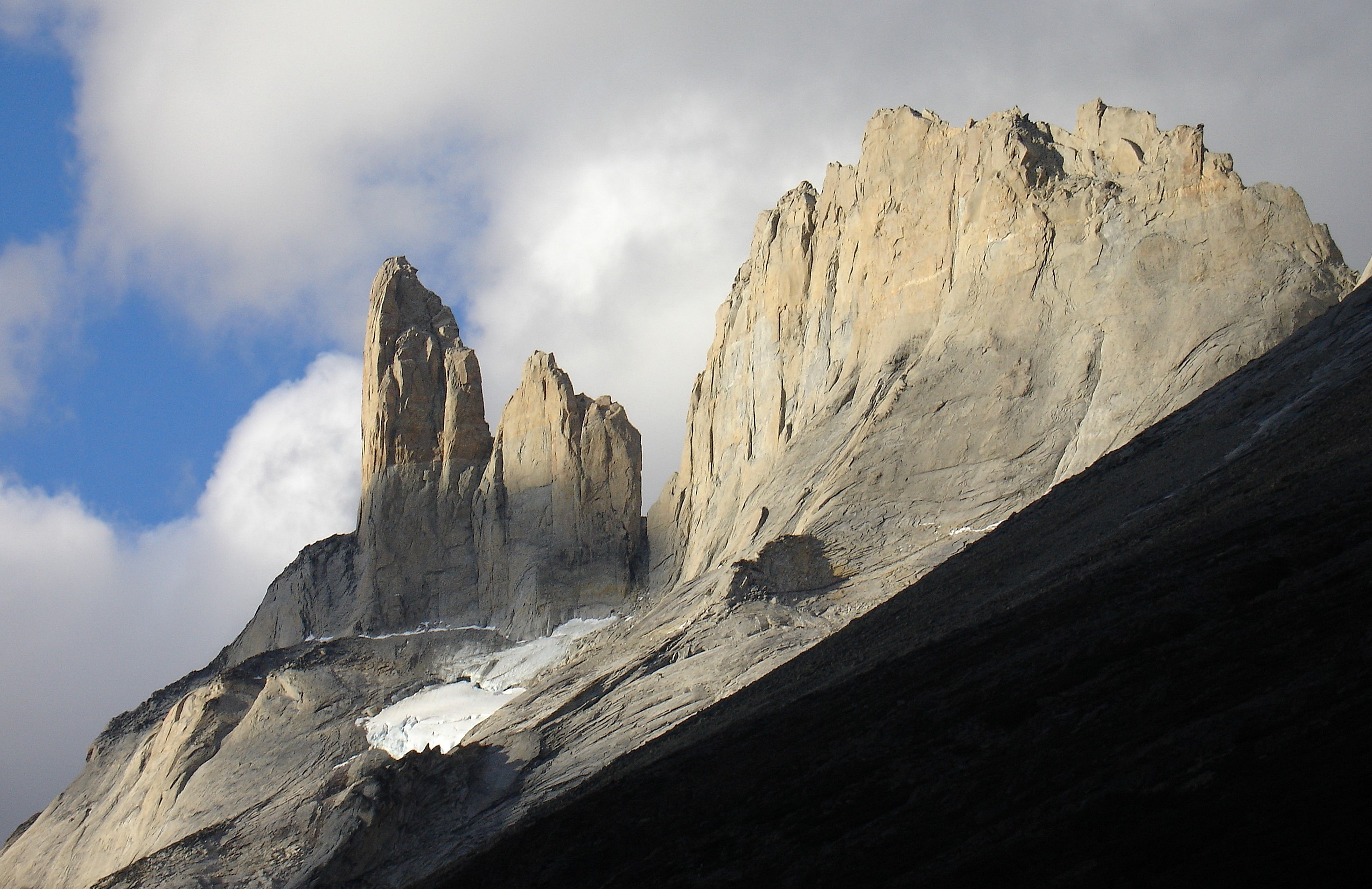
Cerro Espada (left) and Cerro Hoja

== See also ==
- Patagonia

== Notes ==
The peak has not been surveyed. Some sources report the elevation as 2,050 meters (6,725 ft). The first ascent party reported their altimeter recorded 7,520 feet (2,292 meters).
