= Military Geographic Institute (Chile) =

Cartographic authority of Chile

- Instituto Geográfico Militar
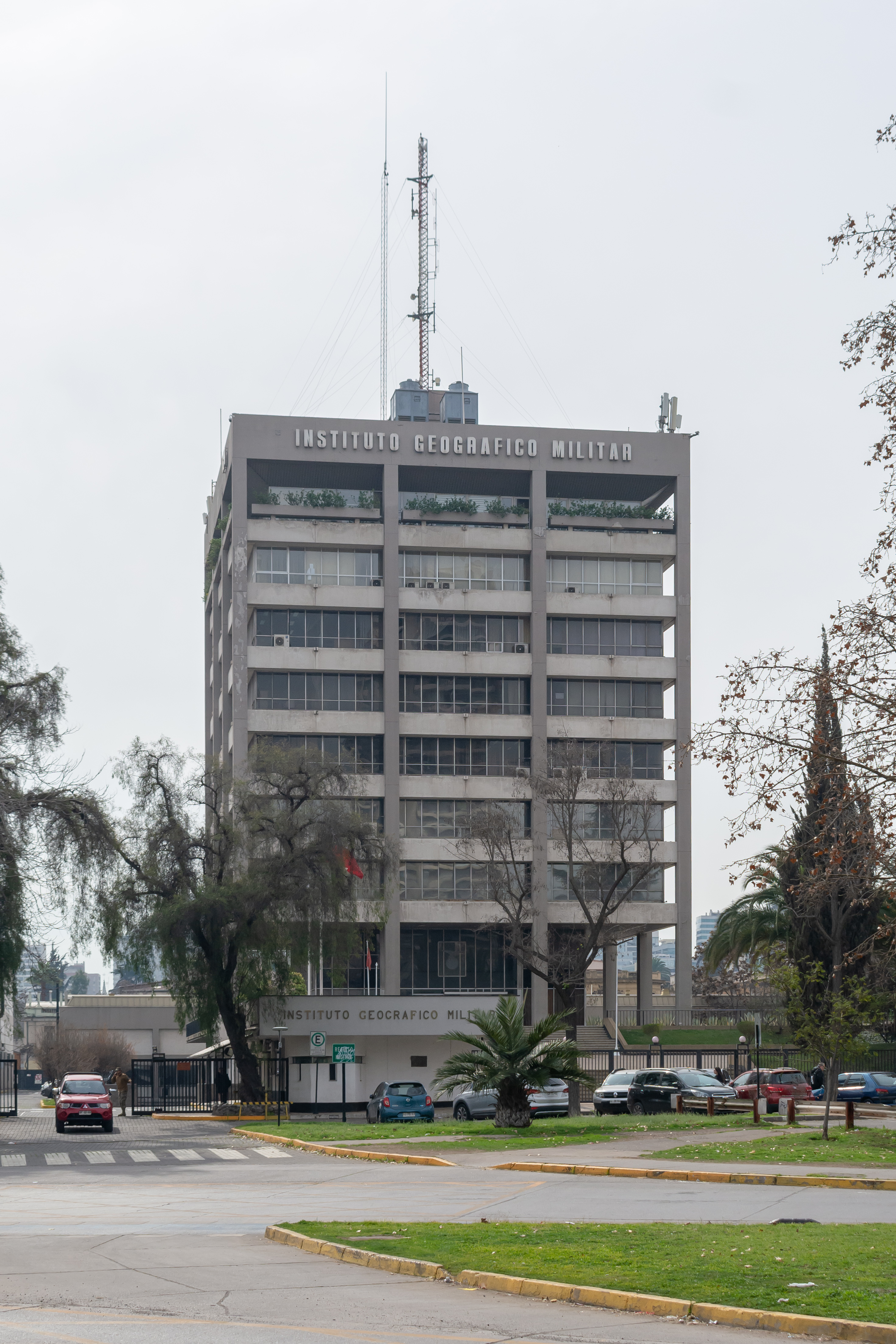

Public agency overview
- Formed: 1881
- Jurisdiction: Chile
- Headquarters: Santa Isabel 1651, Santiago
- Annual budget: CLP$ 4 406 235 million (2020)
- Public agency executive: Colonel Pedro Castillo Figueroa
- Parent Public agency: Chilean Army
- Website: www.igm.cl

The Military Geographic Institute (Spanish: Instituto Geográfico Militar, IGM) is an agency of the Chilean Army responsible for producing and maintaining official cartography and geodetic reference information for Chile, for both defence and civilian uses.

== History ==
Cartographic work linked to the Army predates the agency. During the Independence period, Bernardo O'Higgins established "Depósitos Cartográficos" to create plans and maps needed for the liberation campaign. In 1891, President Jorge Montt created the Geographic Office (Oficina Geográfica) under the Army General Staff, and Over the years, the agency adopted various names.

The IGM was created by Decree No. 1664 of 29 August 1922, continuing work previously carried out by the Army's geographic and cartographic offices. In the 1930s, the agency expanded internal capabilities and staff training, including aerophotogrammetric work carried out in Chile with support from the Chilean Air Force. Chilean Army sources describe a 1947 cooperation agreement with the Inter-American Geodetic Survey of the United States, linked to joint technical work and aerophotogrammetric inputs used in national mapping. Analogue cartographic production began in 1955 using aerophotogrammetric flights, and later shifted from analogue to digital procedures toward the end of the 20th century and the start of the 21st century.

== Products ==
For scientific and educational dissemination, the agency publishes the journal Revista Geográfica de Chile Terra Australis, founded in 1948, and produces educational cartographic materials including an Atlas Geográfico para la Educación with editions used as school support material in Chile. In 1983, the agency also produced the multi-volume Colección Geográfica de Chile, described as a 32-volume set on aspects of Chilean geography.

In 2012, the agency launched a geoportal intended to provide public access to mapping-related information and services, including map viewing, catalogues, and educational resources.
