= Zona Austral =

Southernmost natural region of continental Chile

Natural regions of Chile.

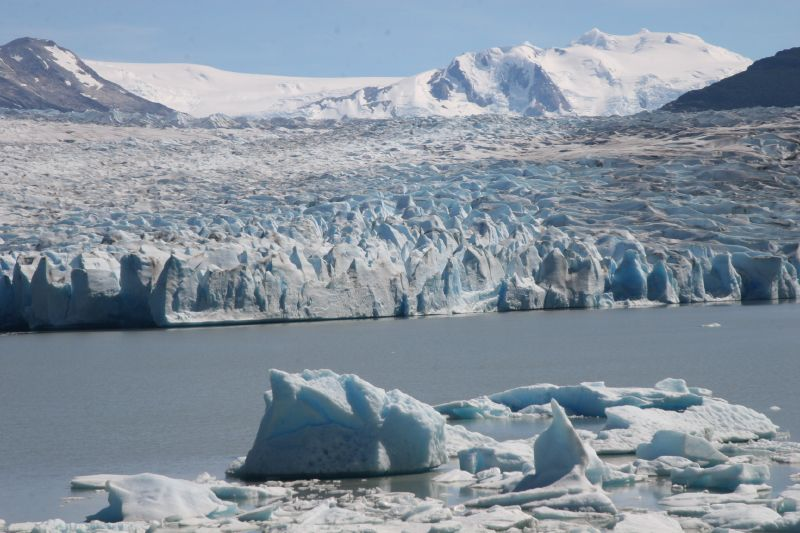
Grey Glacier in the picture is one of the many outlet glaciers of the Southern Patagonian Ice Field

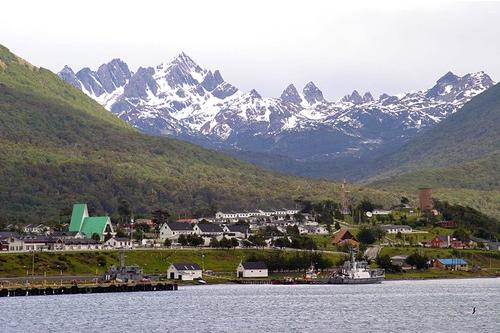
View of Puerto Williams with Dientes de Navarino mountains behind

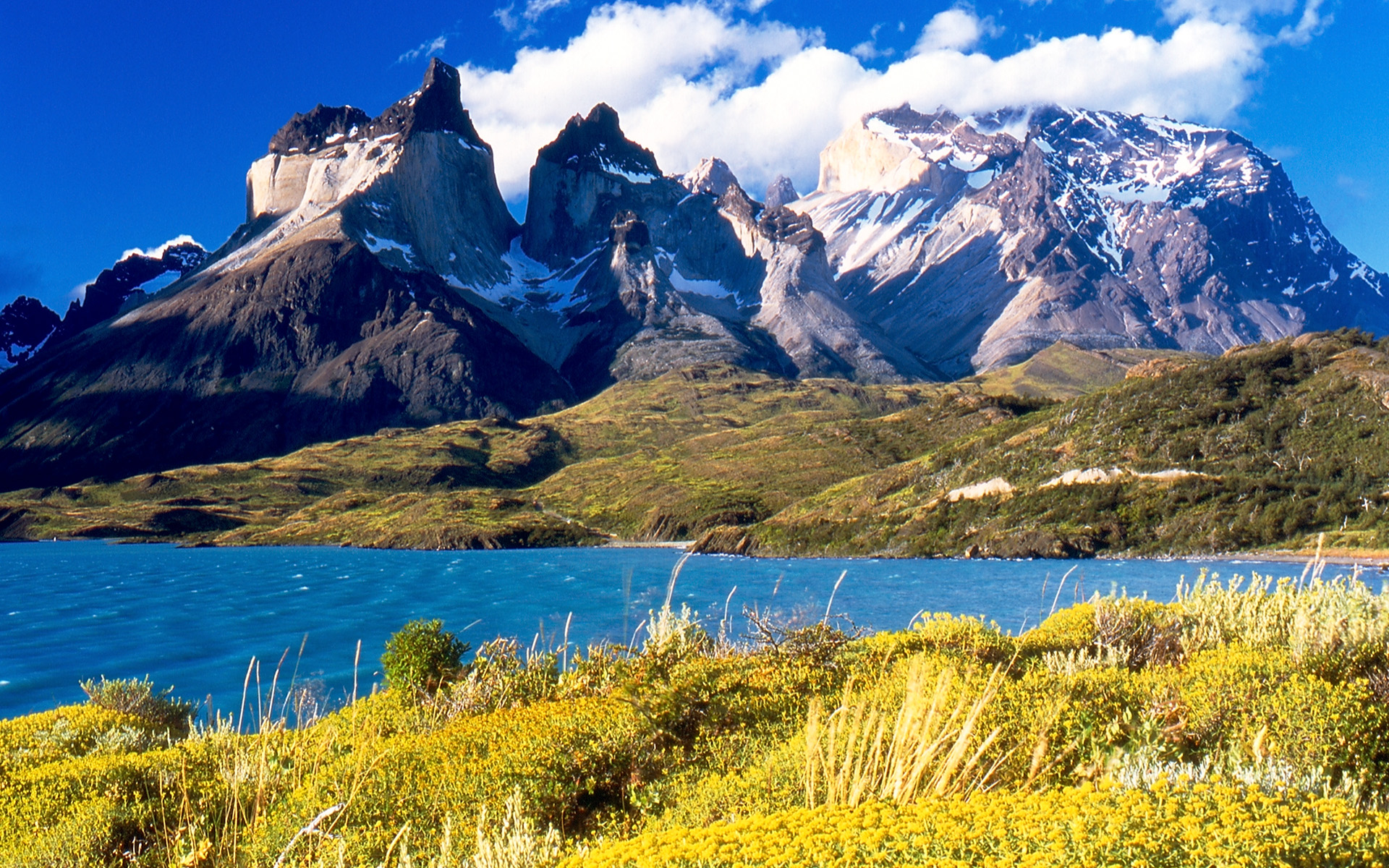
Torres del Paine National Park

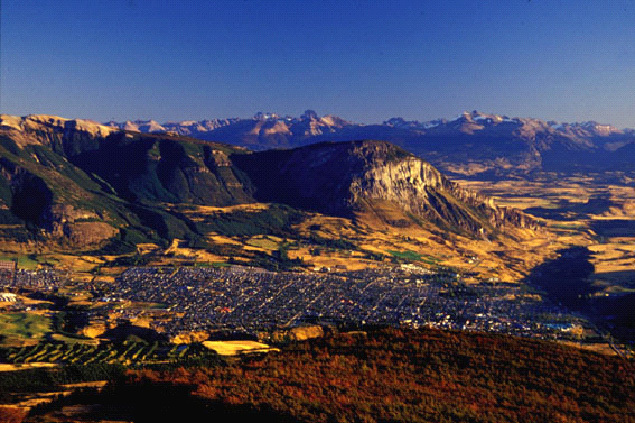
Panoramical view of Coihaique

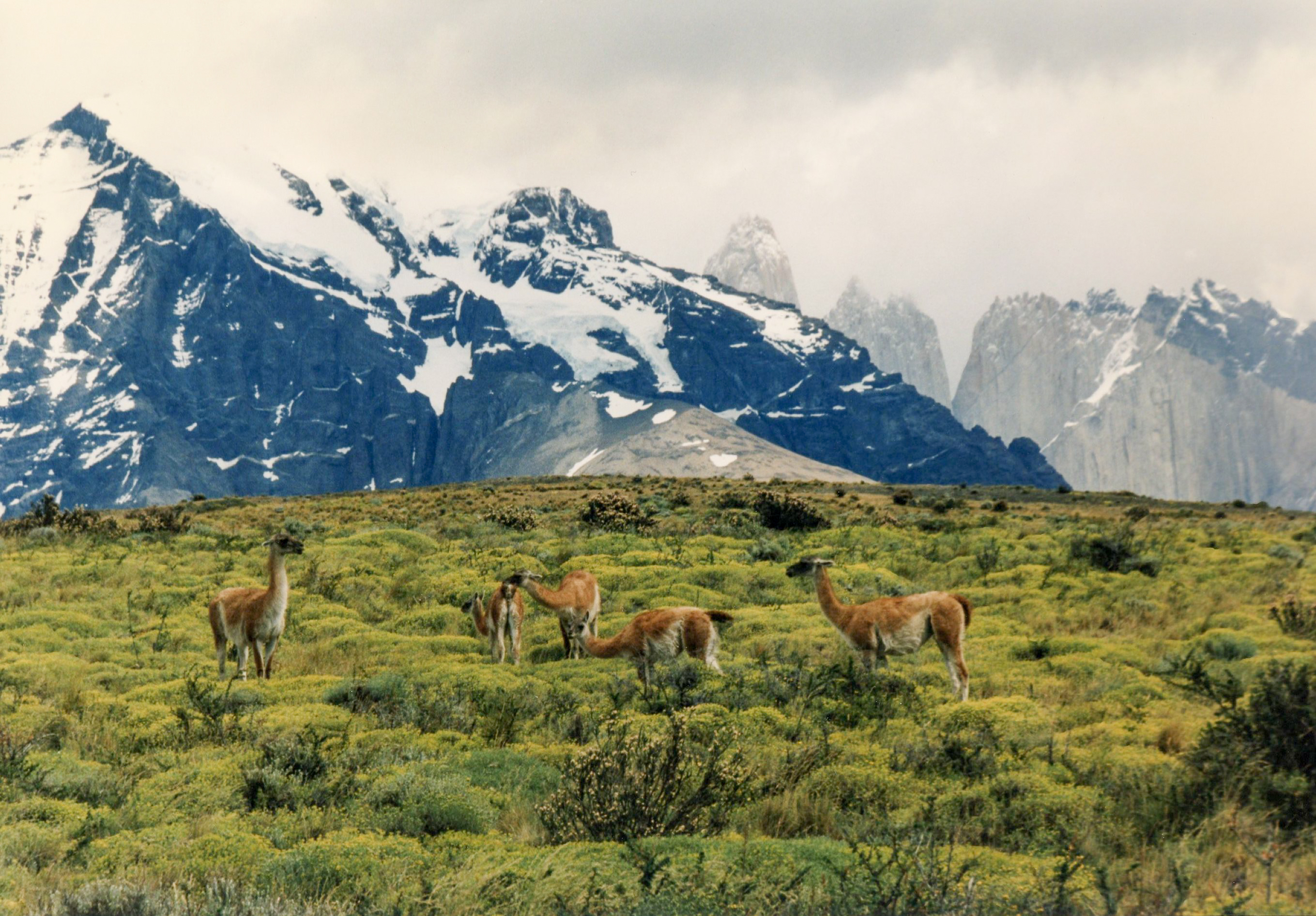
Guanacos in Torres del Paine National Park in Patagonia

The Zona Austral (Southernmost Zone) is one of the five natural regions into which CORFO divided continental Chile in 1950 corresponding to the Chilean portion of Patagonia. It is surrounded by the Zona Sur and the Chacao Channel to the north, the Pacific Ocean and Drake's Passage to the south and west, and the Andean mountains and Argentina to the east. If excluding Chiloé Archipelago, Zona Austral covers all of Chilean Patagonia.

== Geography ==
=== Physical geography ===
In the far south (Chile Austral), which extends from Valdivia through the Chacao Channel to Cape Horn, the Andes and the South Pacific meet. This district of the country is mountainous, heavily forested and inhospitable. The deeply indented coastline is filled with islands which preserve the general outline of the continent southward to the Fuegian archipelago, the outside groups forming a continuation of the Chilean Coast Range. The heavy and continuous rainfall throughout this region, especially in the latitude of Chiloé, gives rise to a large number of rivers and lakes. Farther south, this excessive precipitation is in the form of snow in the Andes, forming glaciers at a comparatively low level which in places discharge into the inlets and bays of the sea. The extreme southern part of this region extends eastward to the Atlantic entrance to the Strait of Magellan, and includes the greater part of the Isla Grande de Tierra del Fuego with all the islands lying south and west of it. There are some comparatively level stretches of country immediately north of the Strait, partly forested and partly grassy plains, where sheep farming has been established with some degree of success, but the greater part of this extreme southern territory is mountainous, cold, wet and inhospitable. The perpetual snow-line here descends to 1,000 to 1,200 m (3,500 to 4,000 ft) above sea-level, and the forest growth does not rise above an altitude of 300 to 450 m (1,000 to 1,500 ft).

==== Mountains ====
From the latitude of the Michinmahuida volcano southwards, a well-defined western longitudinal valley, occupied by the Carretera Austral, divides the Andes into two chains, the eastern being the main chain, to which belong mountains Ventisquero Sur, Barros Arana and Alto Nevado, while the western chain, broken into imposing blocks, contains several high volcanic peaks such as Corcovado, Yanteles and Melimoyu.

An important transverse mountain range of the Andes separates the valleys of the rivers Simpson and Ibañez. This section is dominated by the active Hudson volcano and the jagged Cerro Castillo.

Southward from General Carrera lake is found a wide oblique opening in the range, through which flows the river Baker. The main chain of the Andes in the west is an enormous rugged mass of ice and snow of an average height of 2,700 m (8,900 ft), sending glaciers to all the western fjords. Monte San Valentin (4,058 m (13,310 ft)) is the culminating point of the Andes in the region extending from 49° to 46° S latitude Monte San Lorenzo, detached from the main chain of the Andes, is 3,706 m (12,160 ft) high.

The section from 48° to 52° S latitude is a continuous ice-capped mountain range, and some of the glaciers extend from the eastern lakes to the western channels, where they reach the sea-level. The highest mountain in the section is Lautaro volcano, but the most famous compose the Cordillera del Paine in the south and the Fitz Roy group in the north. The southernmost part of this zone is formed by two small parallel ranges called Cordillera Sarmiento and Cordillera Riesco, which are separated by the Fjord of the Mountains.

From the 52 deg. S. lat. up to Strait of Magellan, the western slope of the Cordillera does not, properly speaking, exist. Abrupt walls overlook the Pacific, and great longitudinal and transversal channels and fjords run right through the heart of the range, cutting it generally in a direction more or less oblique to its axis, the result of movements of the Earth's crust. This region is not fully explored, and all that is known of it is that it is principally composed of the same rocks as the Fuegian Andes, and that the greater part of its upper valleys is occupied by glaciers that reach down to the sea amid dense forest.

The Cordillera of the Andes in Tierra del Fuego is formed of crystalline schists, and culminates in the snow-capped peaks of Mount Darwin and Monte Sarmiento in the Cordillera Darwin, which contains glaciers of greater extent than those of Mont Blanc. The extent of the glaciers is considerable in this region, which, geographically, is more complex than was formerly supposed. Although, in the explored portion of the Fuegian chain, the volcanoes which have been mentioned from time to time have not been met with, there seem to have existed to the south, on the islands, many neo-volcanic rocks, some of which appear to be contemporaneous with the basaltic sheet that covers a part of eastern Patagonia.

Farther south the Andes terminates in Cape Horn. In this section the mountains are composed principally of crystalline rocks, and their heights are inconsiderable when compared with those of the northern Andes.

==== Coasts ====
The continental coastline features numerous inlets and fjords, from which the mountains seem to rise straight up to great elevations; this is, for example, the case with the Cerro Macá (2,300 m (7,546 ft)) near Puerto Aisén. The rest of the land consists of literally thousands of islands forming numerous archipelagos interwoven with sometimes-narrow channels, which provide the main routes of navigation. The grouping of such islands shows that they are in part the summits of a submerged mountain chain, a continuation southward of the Chilean Coast Range. Three groups of these, called Chiloé, Guaitecas and Chonos archipelagoes, lie North of the Taitao Peninsula.

The largest island of this portion of Austral Chile is Chiloé, which is inhabited. Some of the smaller islands of these groups are also inhabited, though the excessive rainfall of these latitudes and the violent westerly storms render them highly unfavourable for human occupation. Some of the smallest islands are barren rocks, but the majority of them are covered with forests. These archipelagoes are separated from the mainland in the north by the gulfs of Ancud and Corcovado, 48 km (30 mi) to 56 km (35 mi) wide, which appear to be a submerged part of the great Chilean Central Valley, and farther south by the narrower Moraleda Channel, which terminates southward in a confusing network of passages between the mainland and the islands of the Chonos group.

Below the Taitao peninsula is the broad open Gulf of Penas, which carries the coast-line eastward fully 160 km (100 mi) and is noticeably free from islands, with some exceptions. The northern entrance to Messier Channel is through this gulf. Messier, Pitt, Sarmiento and Smyth's Channels, which form a comparatively safe and remarkably picturesque inside route for ships, about 540 km (338 mi) in length, separate another series of archipelagoes from the mainland. These channels are in places narrow and tortuous. Among the islands which thickly fringe this part of the coast, the largest are Merino Jarpa (lying within Baker Channel), Prat, Campana (part of Guayaneco Archipelago), Little Wellington, Wellington and Mornington (of the Wellington Archipelago), Madre de Dios, Duke of York, Chatham, Hanover, Cambridge, Contreras, Rennell and the Queen Adelaide Archipelago, a group of small barren rocks and islands lying immediately north of the Pacific entrance to the Strait of Magellan. The large number of English names on this coast is due to the fact that the earliest detailed survey of this region was made by English naval officers; the charts prepared from their surveys are still in use and form the basis of all subsequent maps.

Belonging to the Tierra del Fuego archipelago south of the Strait of Magellan are Desolación, Santa Inés, Clarence, Capitán Aracena, Dawson, Londonderry, Hoste, Navarino and Wollaston Islands, with innumerable smaller islands and rocks fringing their shores and filling the channels between them.

The far south contains large expanses of pastures that are best suited for raising sheep, mainly on Isla Grande de Tierra del Fuego. The area's other main economic activity is oil and natural gas extraction from the areas around the Strait of Magellan. This strait is one of the world's important sea-lanes because it unites the Atlantic and Pacific oceans through a channel that avoids the rough open waters off Cape Horn. The channel is perilous, however, and Chilean pilots guide all vessels through it.

=== Hydrography ===
==== Rivers ====
The Comau Fjord and Vodudahue River traverse the densely wooded country in a north-westerly direction from the Andes to the north-eastern shore of the Gulf of Chacao. This area is home to Pumalín Park. Continuing southward, the Yelcho is the next important river to traverse this region. Forming part of its basin is the Futaleufú River, which drains a large area of Argentine territory. Yelcho flows north-west from Yelcho Lake to the Gulf of Corcovado. The Palena is another river of the same character, having its source in a large frontier lake, which is called General Paz or General Vintter in Argentina and Palena in Chile. It flows for some distance through Argentine territory before crossing into Chile. It receives one large tributary from the south, the Pico River, and enters an estuary of the Gulf of Corcovado a little north of the 44th parallel.

The Cisnes is wholly a Chilean river, draining an extensive Andean region between the 44th and 45th parallels and discharging into the Puyuhuapi Channel, which separates Magdalena Island from the mainland. The Aisén River also has its source near the 46th parallel, and drains a mountainous region as far north es the 45th parallel, receiving numerous tributaries, and discharging a large volume of water into the Aysén Fjord. The next large river is the Baker River, through which the waters of lakes General Carrera and Cochrane, find their way to the Pacific. Both of these large lakes are crossed by the boundary line. The Baker discharges into Baker Channel. The course of the river from lake General Carrera is south and south-west, the short range of mountains in which are found the cerros San Valentín and Arenales forcing it southward for an outlet. Baker inlet also receives the waters of still another large Argentine-Chilean lake, O'Higgins Lake. Its north-west arm drains into the Pascua River. After a short north-westerly course the river discharges into Baker Inlet in lat. 48° 13′ S., long. 73° 24′ W. South of Pascua river there are no large rivers on this coast, but the narrow fjords penetrate deeply into the mountains and bring away the drainage of their snow-capped, storm-swept elevations. A peculiar network of fjords and connecting channels terminating inland in a peculiarly shaped body of water with long, widely branching arms, called Worsley Sound, Obstruction Sound and Última Esperanza Sound, covers an extensive area between the 51st and 53rd parallels, and extends nearly to the Argentine frontier. It has the characteristics of a tidewater river and drains an extensive region.

A noteworthy peculiarity of southern Chile, from the Taitao peninsula to Tierra del Fuego, is the large number of glaciers formed on the western and southern slopes of the Andes and other high elevations, which discharge direct into these deeply cut estuaries. Some of the larger lakes of the Andes have glaciers discharging into them. The formation of these icy streams at comparatively low levels, with their discharge direct into tidewater estuaries, is a phenomenon not to be found elsewhere in the same latitudes.

==== Lakes ====
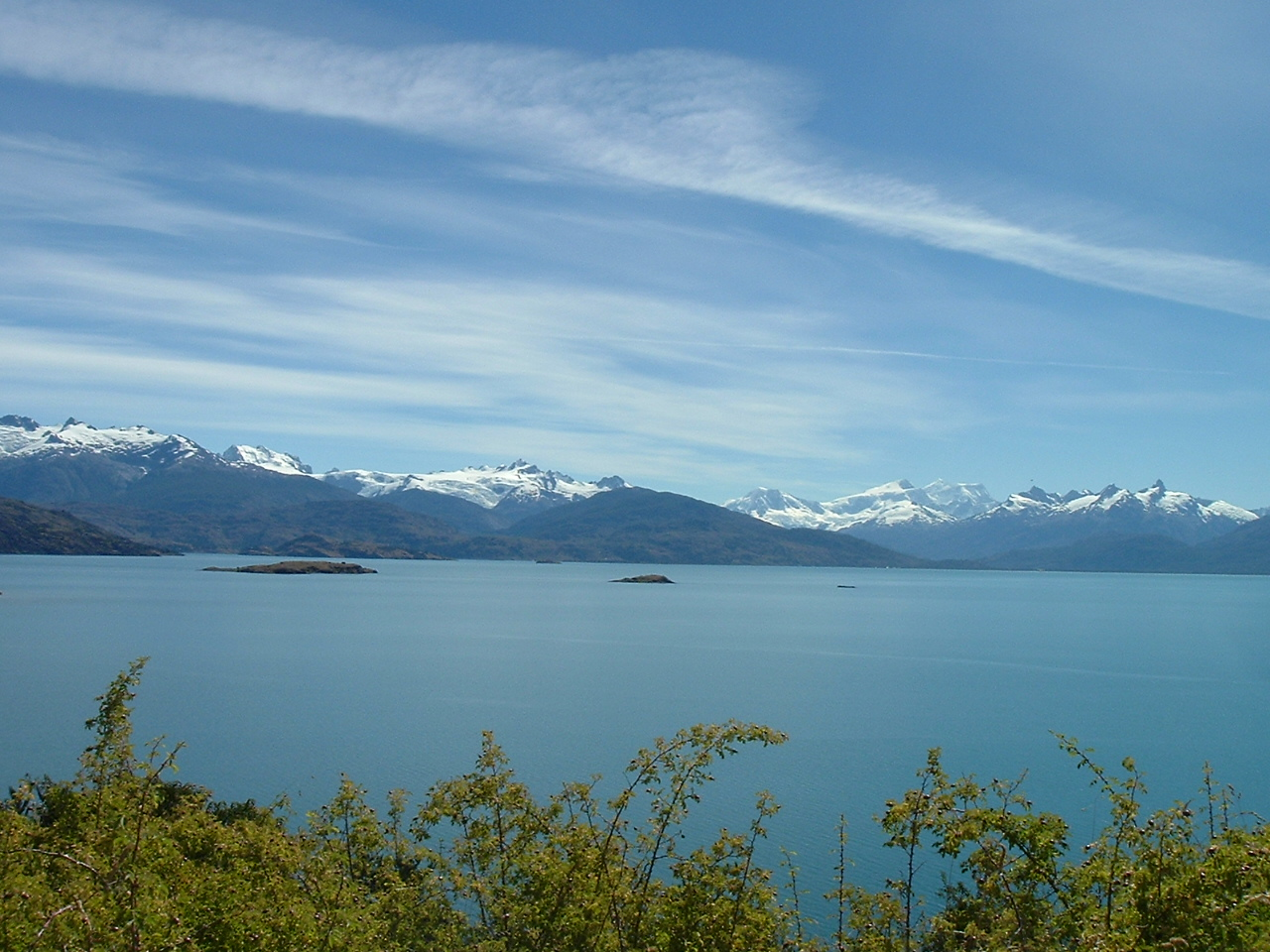
General Carrera Lake

The great Andean lakes of Palena (near the 44th parallel), General Carrera (in lat 46° 30′ S.), Cochrane (47° 15′ S.) and O'Higgins (49° S.), lie partly within Chilean territory. In Argentina are called, respectively, General Paz (also is known as General Vintter), Buenos Aires, Pueyrredón and San Martín. Towards the coast, other important lakes are Presidente Rios Lake, Laguna San Rafael and Yulton Lake.

Southward from the southern portion of Southern Patagonian Ice Field (about 51° S. lat.), lakes include Del Toro and Sarmiento. The former overflows into Última Esperanza Sound.

In the extreme south of Chile mainland is Laguna Blanca, a large fresh-water lake in lat. 52° 30′ S.

Notable lakes in Tierra del Fuego include Fagnano (shared with Argentina), Blanco and Ofhidro.

=== Climate ===
In the northern part of the far south, there is still plenty of rainfall. For instance, Puerto Aisén, at 45° 24′ south latitude, receives 2,973.3 millimeters of rain per year. However, unlike in Valdivia, the rain falls more or less evenly throughout the year in Puerto Aisén. The summer months average 206.1 millimeters, whereas the winter months average 300 millimeters. The temperatures at sea level in Puerto Aisén average 13.6 °C in the summer months and 4.7 °C in the winter months. The area is still heavily forested, although some of the native species of trees that grow in the central and southern parts of the country have given way to others better adapted to a generally colder climate.

The southern part of the far south includes the city of Punta Arenas, which, with about 125,000 inhabitants, is the southernmost city in the world with over 100,000 inhabitants (see Southernmost settlements). It receives much less precipitation; its annual total is only 438.5 millimeters, or a little more than what Valdivia receives in the month of June alone. This precipitation is distributed more or less evenly throughout the year, with the two main summer months receiving a monthly average of 31 millimeters and the winter months 38.9 millimeters, some of it in the form of snow. Temperatures are colder than in the rest of the country. The summer months average 11.1 °C, and the winter months average 2.5 °C. The virtually constant wind from the South Pacific Ocean makes the air feel much colder.

== Demographics ==
The extreme south has a population of more than 200,000 inhabitants; the population of this area is mainly descended from Chilean immigrants, especially from Chiloé and other areas south of the Biobío, and from foreign immigrants of Croatian and Spanish origin or to a lesser extent from other European countries that colonized the area more than a century ago. The Croatian community settled in Punta Arenas, Magallanes. The massive arrival of Croats in Chile began in 1864 and migration grew steadily until 1956 to reach a number of more than 58,000 Croats living mainly in the extreme south of Chile. Punta Arenas is also the home of the largest population of descendants of British settlers. Large number of Sudeten German (German Czechoslovak) settlers from Hranice in present Czech Republic settled Puyuhuapi, a village of Cisnes, Aysén Region.
