= Melimoyu National Park =

Protected area of Chile

- IUCN category II (national park)
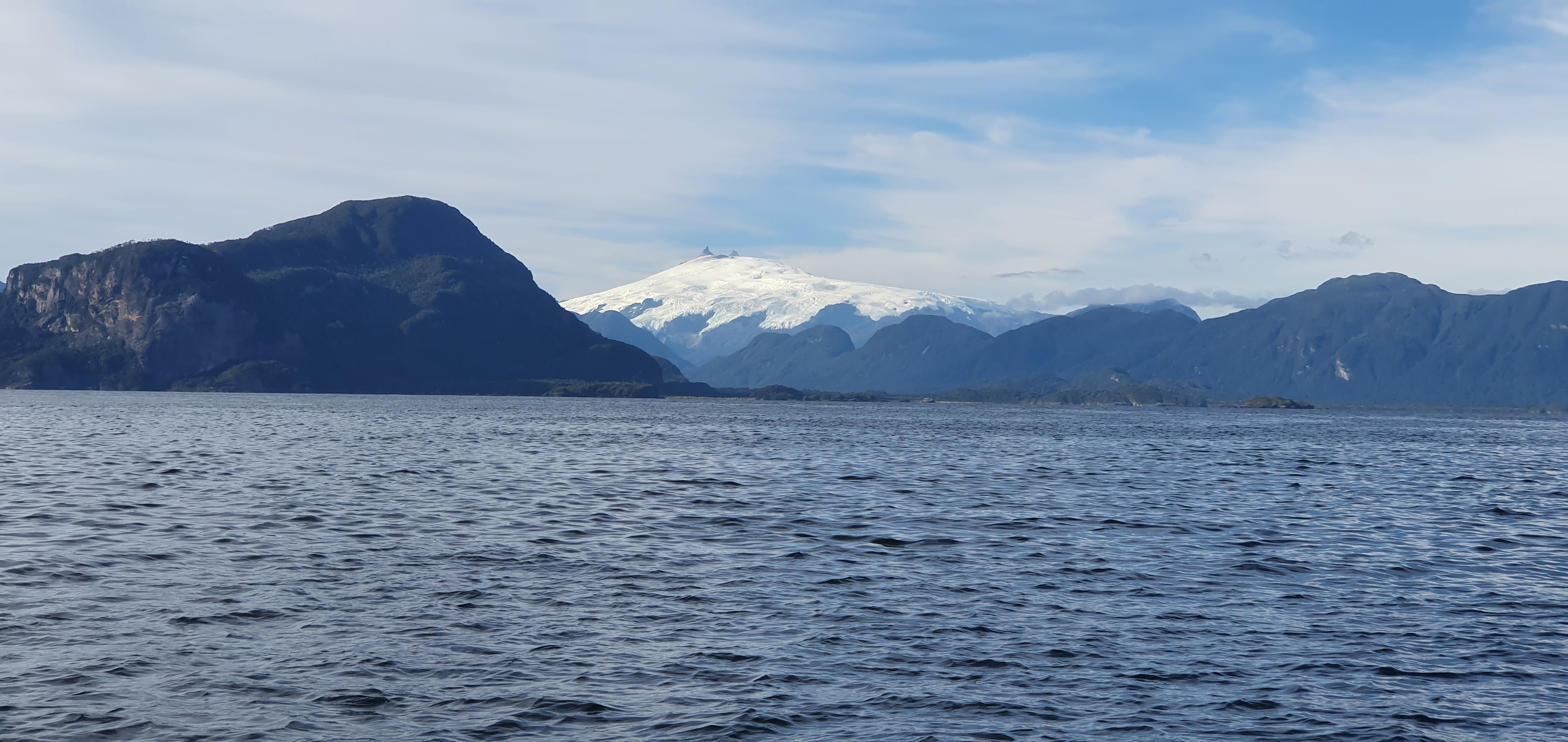
- Melimoyu volcano seen from the surrounding waters
- Interactive map of Melimoyu National Park
- Location: Aysén Region, Chile
- Nearest city: Cisnes
- Coordinates: 44°08′S 72°52′W
- Area: 1,055.0 km^{2} (407.3 sq mi)
- Designation: National Park
- Designated: 2018
- Governing body: Corporación Nacional Forestal (CONAF)

Melimoyu National Park is a protected area of Chile in the comuna of Cisnes, in the Aysén Region. The land for the creation of the park was assembled from public lands and estates donated by Tompkins Conservation, an organization founded by American conservationists Kristine and Douglas Tompkins, as part of a collaborative project to create a "National Parks of Patagonia Network".

Located in the labyrinthine zone of the Patagonian fjords and channels, the park is bordered to the north by the Gulf of Corcovado, to the west by the Moraleda Channel and to the south by the Jacaf Channel, and includes a great part of the Refugio Island. The park and its buffer zone is surrounded by Corcovado, Queulat and Isla Magdalena national parks, as well as the marine protected area named Pitipalena Añihué, located around the mouth of the Palena River.

The park was established, among other purposes, to protect the Melimoyu volcano (the park is named for the volcano), to help preserve endangered species, and to facilitate protection of both whales and dolphins that inhabit the coastal marine areas adjacent to the park.

== History ==
The territory where the park is located has been described by several European explorers since the late 18th century when it was visited by José de Moraleda. Its main landmark, the Melimoyu volcano, serves as an aid for navigation on the Moraleda Channel, which was also described by captain Robert FitzRoy in his Narrative of the Surveying Voyages of H.M.S Adventure and Beagle.

== Description ==
The park consists mainly of large forest of lenga beech, Chiloé's Coigue, mañío and Magellan's beech, extending inland from the coast, except on the highest elevations.

== Infrastructure and access ==
Much of the park is only accessible by sea. There are no roads connecting with the Carretera Austral or its secondary roads, with the exception of two segments that are intersected by Route X-12, a road connecting La Junta with Puerto Raúl Marín Balmaceda. In the latter locality, as well as in the village of Melimoyu and Puerto Cisnes, there are people providing local transport services.

The park lacks infrastructure and there are no rangers to protect and preserve the park.
