= Mentolat =

Ice-filled caldera on a stratovolcano in Chile

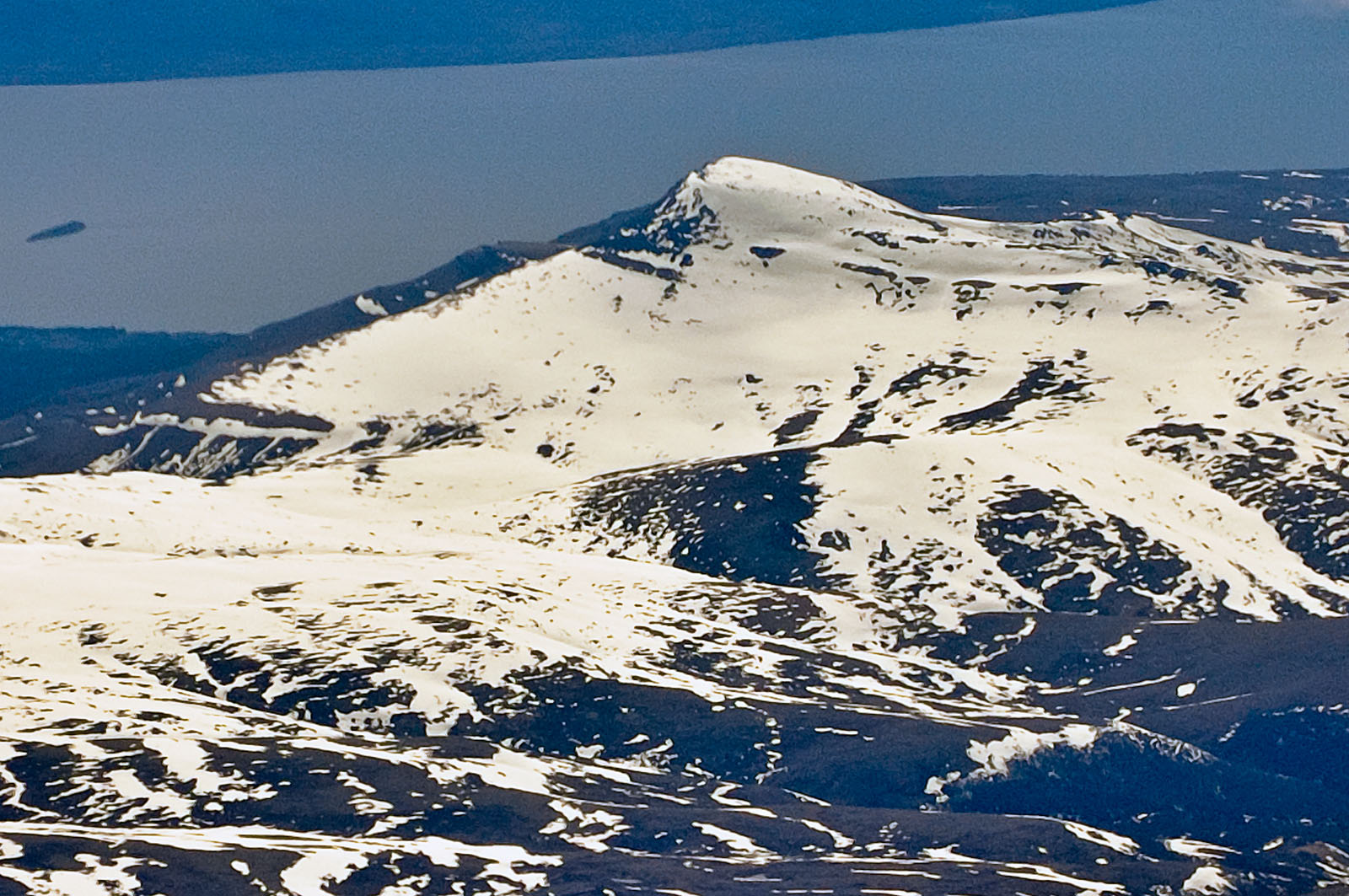

Highest point
- Elevation: 1,660 m (5,450 ft)
- Prominence: 1,620 m (5,310 ft)
- Listing: Ultra
- Coordinates: 44°41′48″S 73°04′33″W

Geography
- Location within Chile
- Location: Chile
- Parent range: Andes

Geology
- Mountain type: Stratovolcano
- Last eruption: 1710 ± 5 years

Mentolat is an ice-filled, 6 km (4 mi) wide caldera in the central portion of Magdalena Island, Aisén Province, Chilean Patagonia. This caldera sits on top of a stratovolcano which has generated lava flows and pyroclastic flows. The caldera is filled with a glacier.

Little is known of the eruptive history of Mentolat, but it is thought to be young, with a possible eruption in the early 18th century that may have formed lava flows on the western slope. The earliest activity occurred during the Pleistocene, and Mentolat has had some major explosive eruptions during the Holocene.

== Etymology and alternative spellings ==
The etymology of Mentolat has been tentatively linked to Men (o) lat, which in the Chono language means "to decipher". Mentolat was referred to as Montalat on a map of the early 20th century, and other spellings such as Menlolat, Montalat, Montolot and Matalot have been identified.

== Geomorphology and geography ==
Mentolat lies on the central part of Isla Magdalena of southern Chile, close to the town of Puerto Cisnes in the Aysen Region, from which it is separated by the Puyuhuapi strait. Other towns in the area are: La Junta, Puerto Gala, Puerto Gaviota and Puyuhuapi. Like most volcanoes in the region, Mentolat is far away from roads and difficult to access.

Mentolat is located in the Southern Volcanic Zone, a 1,400 kilometres (870 mi) long volcanic arc with about 40 volcanoes active during the late Quaternary. The Southern Volcanic Zone is typically subdivided into four separate segments; Mentolat belongs in the southern segment. Some large volcanic eruptions have occurred in the Southern Volcanic Zone including the Pleistocene Diamante caldera eruption at Maipo and, during historical times, the 1932 eruption of Cerro Azul and the 1991 eruption of Cerro Hudson.

Mentolat is a stratovolcano which has erupted lava flows and pyroclastic flows, and covers a surface area of 204 square kilometres (79 sq mi). The total volume of the edifice has been estimated to be about 36 cubic kilometres (8.6 cu mi), 46.3 cubic kilometres (11.1 cu mi), or 88.2 cubic kilometres (21.2 cu mi). A 6 kilometres (3.7 mi) wide caldera is filled with ice, which covered a surface area of 3.35 square kilometres (1.29 sq mi) in 2011. In 1979, the glacier covered a surface area almost 2.5 times larger. Alternatively, the caldera may be filled with a lava dome, or an ice covered lava dome. The caldera may have formed during one of Mentolat's large explosive eruptions.

The composition of the rocks ranges from basaltic andesite to andesite. Phenocrysts contained in Mentolat's rocks include: clinopyroxene, olivine, orthopyroxene and plagioclase. Mentolat tephras have noticeably lower potassium contents than the tephras of other volcanoes in the region and its magmas appear to originate from parental melts that contain more water and volatiles than the parental melts of the magmas of other volcanoes. The magmas are stored at a depth of about 5 kilometres (3.1 mi).

== Geology ==
The Nazca Plate at the Peru-Chile Trench subducts beneath the South America Plate at an average rate of 6.6 centimetres per year (2.6 in/year). This subduction occurs at an angle and has generated the Liquiñe-Ofqui fault zone which runs along the volcanic arc. Where the Chile Rise intersects the trench the Nazca Plate ends and the Antarctic Plate begins. This plate also subducts farther south beneath the South America Plate but at a lower pace of 1.85 centimetres per year (0.73 in/year). Part of the Nazca Plate has been shoved over the South America Plate at the Taitao Peninsula resulting in the formation of the Taitao ophiolite. A number of fracture zones cross the Nazca Plate and are subducted in the trench; one of these is subducted directly under Mentolat and may explain anomalous traits of the Mentolat magmas.

The Andes are a site of volcanic activity, which is usually subdivided into four separate volcanic zones: the Northern Volcanic Zone, the Central Volcanic Zone, the Southern Volcanic Zone and the Austral Volcanic Zone. These volcanic zones are separated by gaps where no recent volcanic activity has occurred. These gaps are not static; the gap separating the Austral and the Southern Volcanic Zones has been moving northward for the past 15-20 million years. The Southern Volcanic Zone itself is subdivided into additional volcanic zones, the Northern, Transitional, Central and Southern Southern Volcanic Zone and contains over two calderas and over 60 volcanoes with Quaternary activity.

More volcanoes in the neighbourhood of Mentolat include Melimoyu and Cay to the north, Maca and Cerro Hudson to the south, as well as several monogenetic volcanoes. South of Hudson, the Chile Rise subducts in the trench. Volcanic activity is absent in the 500 kilometres (310 mi) long area, as its subduction disrupts the slab. These volcanoes are part of the Southern Volcanic Zone, while the volcanoes south of this gap belong to the Austral Volcanic Zone. Changes in magma composition are also noticeable across the gap; the volcanoes of the southernmost Southern Volcanic Zone have erupted basalt and basaltic andesite with subordinate andesite, dacite and rhyolite, while the volcanoes of the Austral Volcanic Zone have erupted adakitic hornblende andesites and dacites.

A major geological structure in the region is the Northern Patagonian Batholith. This structure, formed by plutonic rocks including granodiorite and tonalite, is crossed north-south by the Liquiñe-Ofqui fault zone and surrounded by metamorphic rocks west and volcanic rocks east of the batholith.

== Climate and vegetation ==
Temperatures in the region range from 8–13 °C (46–55 °F) and precipitation can reach 7,500 millimetres (300 in) thanks to the orographic precipitation triggered by the Andes. The vegetation of the area is formed by evergreen temperate rainforests.

Until 17,800 years before present, the region southeast of Hudson was covered by the glaciers of the last ice age. Their retreat left a series of lakes that caught tephra deposited by volcanic activity.

== Eruptive history ==
Eruptive activity at Mentolat has been ongoing since the Pleistocene, several 35,600 and 34,200 years old tephra layers in Laguna Potrok Aike may be linked to Mentolat and other explosive eruptions took place over 17,340 years ago. An eruption during the late Glacial formed the MENo tephra and another eruption 11,700 years ago produced about 1.8 cubic kilometres (0.43 cu mi) of tephra. The volcanic activity has been inferred from tephra layers in lakes and outcrops, about 13 eruptions have been identified with the help of tephrochronology.

A major eruption of Mentolat occurred during the Holocene. This eruption generated a 1.4 cubic kilometres (0.34 cu mi) large ash deposit, the MEN1 ash, which extends southeast of the volcano. Grey pumice and scoria were deposited by this eruption, which was preceded by ash fall and ended with the deposition of lapilli. The MEN1 eruption was andesitic. The eruption may have occurred 7,690 ± 60 years ago, 5,010 ± 50 years BCE, 7,710 ± 120 years ago, another date is 7,518 years before present, as determined by radiocarbon dating. The MEN1 ash has been attributed to a more recent eruption, between 2,510 ± 30 and 3,890 ± 30 years ago.

Less than 6,960 years before present, a basaltic andesite-andesite ash of yellow ochre colour was erupted from Mentolat. The yellow-grey MEN2 ash has been dated by radiocarbon dating to be over 90 ± 30 years before present. This eruption had a minimum volume of 3.7 cubic kilometres (0.89 cu mi). Additional tephra layers indicate eruptions less than 2,560 and 4,320 years ago, along with a number of smaller eruptions.

Early in the 18th century, Mentolat erupted and formed lava flows on its western flank. These are Mentolat's best preserved volcanic deposits. The eruption deposited lapilli pumice. No historical records of activity exist, however, although reports by Serrano in the 18th century may refer to a lava flow from Mentolat. The most recent eruption may have been in 1850, or 1710 ± 5.

Large explosive eruptions in the southern segment of the Southern Volcanic Zone occur on average every 725 years, and tephras from volcanoes in the Southern Volcanic Zone have been transported over large distances. The largest Holocene volcanic eruption of the Southern Andes occurred 6,700 years before present at Cerro Hudson. Tephra layers found at Mallín El Embudo have been attributed to Mentolat, as well as to Melimoyu and Cerro Hudson.

== Threats ==
Large explosive eruptions have occurred in the Southern Volcanic Zone; at least 25 large eruptions occurred in the Holocene; similar, future eruptions could have regional or even hemispheric effects as observed with the 2012 Puyehue-Cordon Caulle eruption. The town of Puerto Cisnes could experience ash falls of over 10 centimetres (3.9 in), as could other towns such as Coyhaique. SERNAGEOMIN publishes a volcano hazard level for Mentolat.

Ash fall from volcanic eruptions affects the ecosystem. Trees lose their leaves, plants in the forest understory are buried, the forest canopy opens and plants which do not tolerate shadowing can grow.

Further hazards exist in the form of snowpack on about half of the volcanoes; under the influence of pyroclastic flows, the snowpack can melt, generating dangerous lahars such as the one generated by the 1985 eruption of Nevado del Ruiz volcano in Colombia. This eruption claimed 23,000 fatalities, and lahars are a major cause of volcanic eruption associated fatalities.

== See also ==
- List of volcanoes in Chile
- List of Ultras of South America

== Sources ==
- Corbella, Hugo; Lara, Luis E. (1 January 2008). "Late Cenozoic Quaternary Volcanism in Patagonia and Tierra del Fuego". In Rabassa, J. (ed.). Developments in Quaternary Sciences. The Late Cenozoic of Patagonia and Tierra del Fuego. Vol. 11. Elsevier. pp. 95–119. doi:10.1016/S1571-0866(07)10006-3. ISBN 9780444529541.
- Gallego, A.; Russo, R. M.; Comte, D.; Mocanu, V. I.; Murdie, R. E.; Vandecar, J. C. (1 September 2010). "Seismic noise tomography in the Chile ridge subduction region". Geophysical Journal International. 182 (3): 1478–1492. Bibcode:2010GeoJI.182.1478G. doi:10.1111/j.1365-246X.2010.04691.x. ISSN 0956-540X.
- Fontijn, Karen; Lachowycz, Stefan M.; Rawson, Harriet; Pyle, David M.; Mather, Tamsin A.; Naranjo, José A.; Moreno-Roa, Hugo (1 April 2014). "Late Quaternary tephrostratigraphy of southern Chile and Argentina". Quaternary Science Reviews. 89: 70–84. Bibcode:2014QSRv...89...70F. doi:10.1016/j.quascirev.2014.02.007.
- Mella, Mauricio; Ramos, Alejandro; Kraus, Stefan; Duhart, Paul (2012). "Tefroestratigrafía, magnitud y geoquímica de erupciones holocenas mayores del volcán Mentolat, Andes del Sur (44º40'S), Chile" (PDF). biblioserver.sernageomin.cl (in Spanish). 13th Chilean Geological Congress. Archived from the original (PDF) on 8 January 2017.
- Rivera, Andrés; Bown, Francisca (1 August 2013). "Recent glacier variations on active ice capped volcanoes in the Southern Volcanic Zone (37°–46°S), Chilean Andes". Journal of South American Earth Sciences. 45: 345–356. Bibcode:2013JSAES..45..345R. doi:10.1016/j.jsames.2013.02.004. hdl:10533/130506.
- Weller, D. J.; Miranda, C. G.; Moreno, P. I.; Villa-Martínez, R.; Stern, C. R. (3 December 2015). "Tephrochronology of the southernmost Andean Southern Volcanic Zone, Chile" (PDF). Bulletin of Volcanology. 77 (12): 107. Bibcode:2015BVol...77..107W. doi:10.1007/s00445-015-0991-2. hdl:10533/148394. ISSN 0258-8900. S2CID 43634199.
- Weller, D.J.; Stern, C.R. (January 2018). "Along-strike variability of primitive magmas (major and volatile elements) inferred from olivine-hosted melt inclusions, southernmost Andean Southern Volcanic Zone, Chile". Lithos. 296–299: 233–244. Bibcode:2018Litho.296..233W. doi:10.1016/j.lithos.2017.11.009. ISSN 0024-4937.
- Weller, D. J.; de Porras, M. E.; Maldonado, A.; Méndez, C.; Stern, C. R. (1 March 2019). "Petrology, geochemistry, and correlation of tephra deposits from a large early-Holocene eruption of Mentolat volcano, southern Chile". Journal of South American Earth Sciences. 90: 282–295. Bibcode:2019JSAES..90..282W. doi:10.1016/j.jsames.2018.12.020. ISSN 0895-9811. S2CID 133895464.
