= Puerto Cisnes Airport =

- IATA: none; ICAO: SCPK

Summary
- Airport type: Public
- Serves: Puerto Cisnes
- Elevation AMSL: 45 ft / 14 m
- Coordinates: 44°45′30″S 72°41′55″W

Map
- Location of Puerto Cisnes Airport in Chile

Runways
Direction	Length		Surface
Direction	m	ft	Surface
13/31	735	2,411	Grass
- Source: Landings.com Google Maps GCM

Puerto Cisnes Airport (ICAO: SCPK) is an airport serving Puerto Cisnes, a port town on the Puyuhuapi Channel in the Aysén Region of Chile.

The airport is in the delta of the Cisnes River, 3 kilometres (1.9 mi) southwest of the town. There are hills northeast and southwest of the runway.

== See also ==
- Transport in Chile
- List of airports in Chile
