= Puerto Cisnes =

- Town
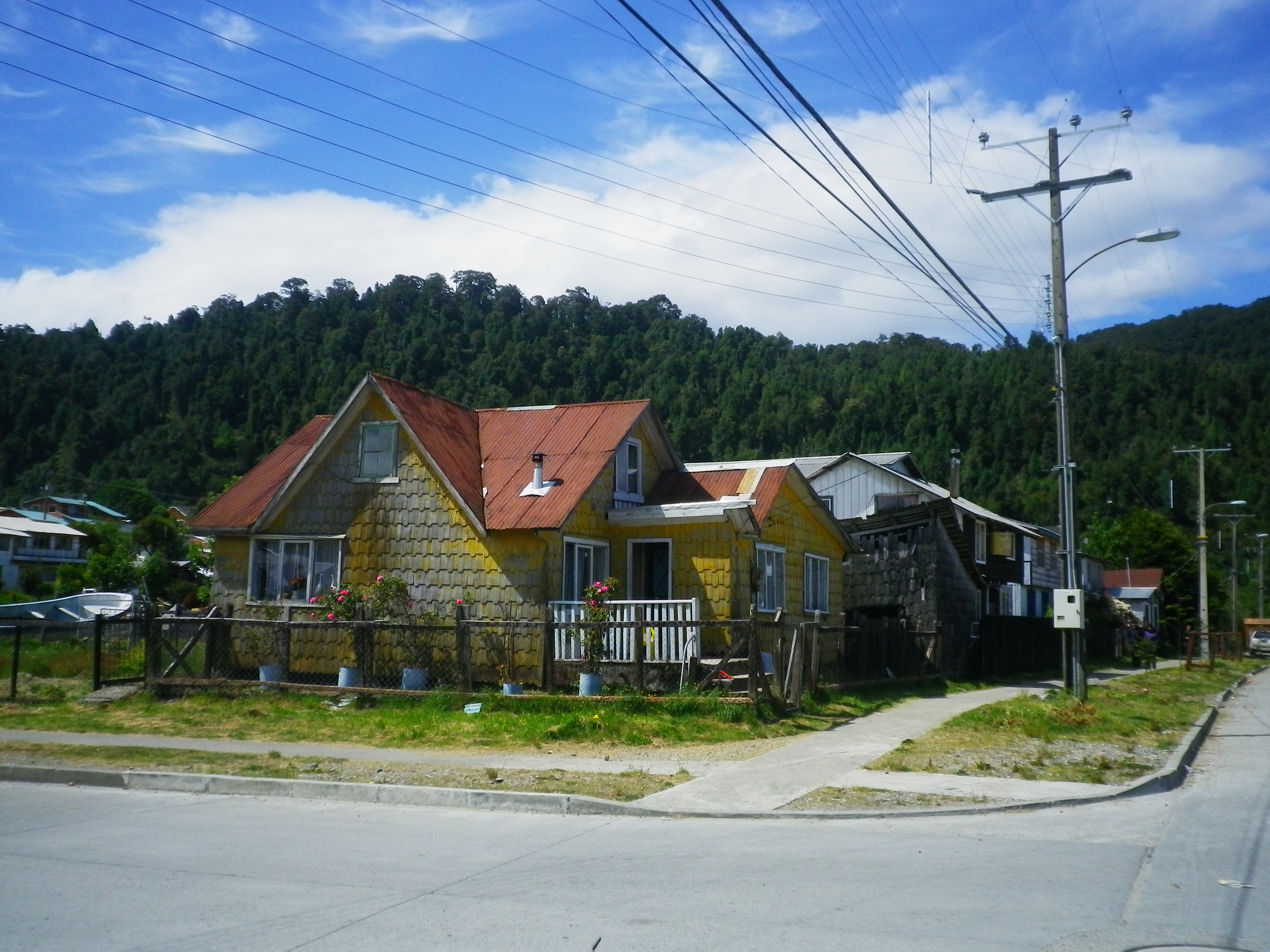

- Location in Chile
- Coordinates: 44°45′S 72°42′W
- Country: Chile
- Region: Aisén
- Province: Aisén
- Commune: Cisnes

Area
  - Total: 16,093 km^{2} (6,214 sq mi)

Population (2002 Census)
  - Total: 5,739
  - Density: 0.3566/km^{2} (0.9236/sq mi)
- Area code: 56 + ?
- Climate: Cfb

Puerto Cisnes (Spanish for: "port swans") is a town and seaport in Cisnes commune, Aysén Province, Aysén del General Carlos Ibáñez del Campo Region in the Chilean Patagonia. The town is on the Puyuhuapi Channel at the outflow of Cisnes River. The town is located in the northwestern portion of the Aysén Region, an area that includes numerous islands, fjords and channels. The major island is Magdalena Island, which contains the national park that bears its name. Queulat National Park straddles the border between this commune and Lago Verde. Much of the commune area is covered with a lush vegetation and is divided by the Moraleda Channel. The main mountain of the area is Melimoyu volcano.

== Climate ==
Climate data for Puerto Cisnes (1986–2015)
Month	Jan	Feb	Mar	Apr	May	Jun	Jul	Aug	Sep	Oct	Nov	Dec	Year
Mean daily maximum °C (°F)	19.1 (66.4)	19.4 (66.9)	17.2 (63.0)	13.6 (56.5)	10.5 (50.9)	8.6 (47.5)	7.8 (46.0)	8.9 (48.0)	11.5 (52.7)	13.6 (56.5)	15.4 (59.7)	17.6 (63.7)	13.6 (56.5)
Mean daily minimum °C (°F)	8.9 (48.0)	8.3 (46.9)	6.7 (44.1)	5.1 (41.2)	3.3 (37.9)	2.0 (35.6)	1.2 (34.2)	1.8 (35.2)	3.4 (38.1)	4.6 (40.3)	5.8 (42.4)	7.6 (45.7)	4.9 (40.8)
Average precipitation mm (inches)	181 (7.1)	131 (5.2)	209 (8.2)	269 (10.6)	378 (14.9)	393 (15.5)	341 (13.4)	353 (13.9)	242 (9.5)	245 (9.6)	227 (8.9)	172 (6.8)	3,142 (123.7)
Average relative humidity (%)	84	85	83	86	86	85	87	86	84	82	80	75	84
Source: Atlas Agroclimatico de Chile

== Location ==
To get to Puerto Cisnes, you must stray approximately 30 kilometers off of the Carretera Austral. The city itself has two entrances, one at the beginning of the city and one at the end. The first entrance has new road which has been redone recently due to the inflow of new tourists, while the other is the original road of Puerto Cisnes and it has more than enough pot holes.

The location of Puerto Cisnes is why it has been named the capital of the Cisnes Commune, which contains roughly 5,000 people. It's basically located right in the middle of its outlying Peninsulas of Puerto Gala and Puerto Gaviota and because the region travels more by ocean it has easy access to the other ports of the commune.

It's located 196 kilometers outside of the city of Coyhaique.

== Economy ==
The most viable economic possibilities for those living in Puerto Cisnes are the salmon industry due to the plentiful rivers and also trade. However, due to the increasing growth of tourism in their summer months, many have adapted to deal with many touristic services which include activities from adventures and hikes to personal tours. This also includes services of any type of living, hotels, cabins, hostels and more. The rest of the cities commerce includes restaurants of food of all types, gas stations and a bank. Other jobs include local volunteer fire fighters for the Bomberos de Chile, Hospital Jorge Ibar, police officers for the Carabineros de Chile and the location of Chile's Navy, the Armada de Chile right off the coast.
