= Villa Tapera Airport =

- IATA: none; ICAO: SCRC

Summary
- Airport type: Public
- Serves: La Tapera, Chile
- Elevation AMSL: 1,640 ft / 500 m
- Coordinates: 44°38′25″S 71°39′55″W

Map
- Location of Villa Tapera Airport in Chile

Runways
Direction	Length		Surface
Direction	m	ft	Surface
06/24	900	2,953	Gravel
- Source: Landings.com Google Maps GCM

Villa Tapera Airport (Spanish: Aeropuerto Villa Tapera), (ICAO: SCRC) is an airport serving the village of La Tapera in the Lago Verde commune of Chile's Aysén Region. It is 83 kilometres (52 mi) east of Puerto Cisnes.

The runway is just north of the village, and south of the Cisnes River. There are nearby hills off the east end, and rising terrain in all quadrants.

== See also ==
- Transport in Chile
- List of airports in Chile
