= Figueroa River =

Figueroa River Río Figueroa
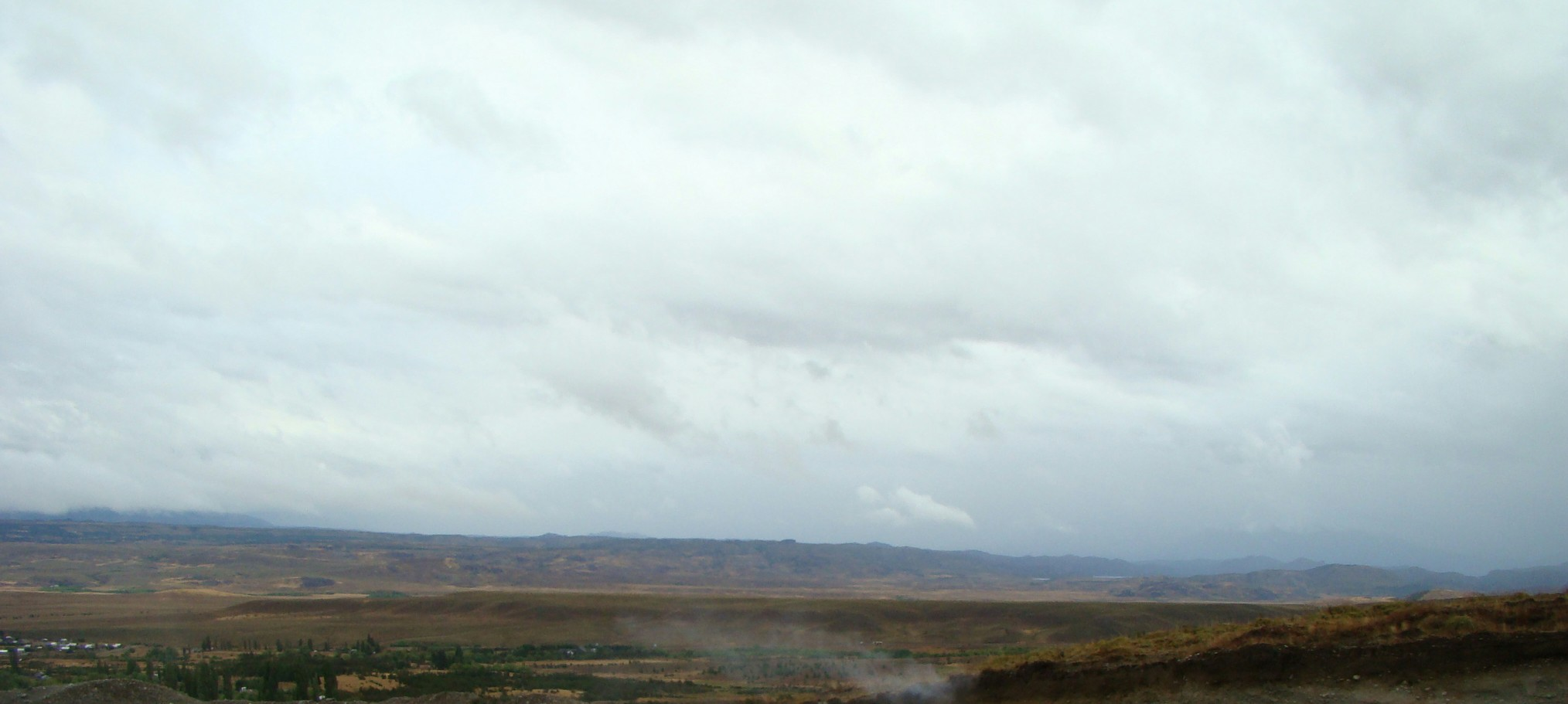

Location
- Country: Chile
- Region: Aysén

Physical characteristics
- Source: Lago Verde
  - location: Lago Verde Comuna
  - coordinates: 44°13′39″S 71°54′22″W
  - elevation: 413 m (1,355 ft)
- Mouth: Rosselot Lake
  - location: Cisnes Comuna
  - coordinates: 44°02′26″S 72°17′58″W
  - elevation: 85 m (279 ft)
- Length: 61 km (38 mi)
- Basin size: 3,953 km^{2} (1,526 sq mi)
- Discharge
  - location: mouth
  - average: 500 m^{3}/s (18,000 cu ft/s)

Basin features
- Tributaries
  - right: Pico River

The Figueroa River is a river in the Aysén Region of southern Chile in South America. It runs only sixty-one kilometers from Green Lake (Lago Verde) to Rosselot Lake, but is considered an exceptional trout steam for fly fishing, as well as for kayaking and white-water rafting. It is part of the Palena River watershed (catchment basin), and its largest tributary is the Pico River.

The Figueroa River runs through mountainous terrain with often steep sided to sheer banks. Erosion has increased in the last fifty years as the mountains sides are burned to clear them for pasturage.
