= Isla Magdalena National Park =

- IUCN category II (national park)
- Location within Chile
- Location: Aysén del General Carlos Ibáñez del Campo Region, Chile
- Nearest city: Puerto Cisnes
- Coordinates: 44°40′00″S 73°08′00″W
- Area: 1,576 km^{2} (608 sq mi)
- Established: 1983
- Governing body: Corporación Nacional Forestal

The Isla Magdalena National Park (Spanish: Parque Nacional Isla Magdalena) is a 1,576 km^{2} (608 sq mi) protected area in Magdalena Island, Patagonia, Chile. It was created in 1967 as forest reserve. It was classified as a national park in June 1983.

Puerto Gaviota in the south of the national park is considered particularly noteworthy. In addition to larger Atilio island in the north, there are a number of smaller islands in the national park.

The Isla Magdalena climate has an annual average temperature of 6 to 8 °C (43 to 46 °F) and an annual precipitation of approximately 4,000 mm (157 in) per year.

The park can best reached by sea from the ports Puerto Cisnes or Puerto Puyuhuapi. On the island, no infrastructure exists.

The highest point of the park is Mentolat Volcano at 1,660 m (5,446 ft).
