= Queulat National Park =

National park in southern Chilean Patagonia

- IUCN category II (national park)
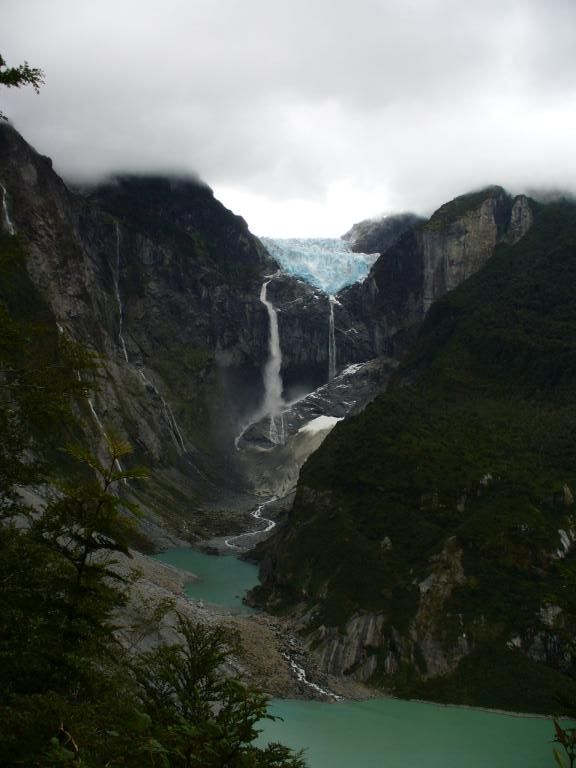
- Queulat Glacier

- Location within Chile
- Location: Aysén del General Carlos Ibáñez del Campo Region, Chile
- Nearest city: Puerto Puyuhuapi
- Coordinates: 44°25′0″S 72°22′0″W
- Area: 1,541 km^{2} (595 sq mi)
- Established: 1983
- Visitors: 6,195 (in 2004)
- Governing body: Corporación Nacional Forestal

Queulat National Park is a national park of Chile located in the Aysén del General Carlos Ibáñez del Campo Region. The park is bordered by the Cisnes River on the south side and is neighbor to Lago Rosselot National Reserve. It contains 1,541 km^{2} (595 sq mi) of glacier-capped mountains and virgin evergreen forests.

== History ==
In 1766, the Jesuit Father José García Alsue explored the area searching for the City of the Caesars.

== Park geography ==
Local relief is dominated by the Patagonian Andes, with some elevations greater than 2,000 m (6,562 ft) above sea level. A portion of the Puyuhuapi Volcanic Group form part of the park, specifically the area south of the Lake Risopatrón. The park comprises two small ice fields, with glaciers of up to 12 km (7 mi) long. The largest glaciated area is Queulat ice cap, which encompasses about 80 km^{2} (31 sq mi) and contains the park's centerpiece, the Queulat Hanging Glacier. This ice cap is centered at 44°25′S 72°25′W, and is at an elevation of 1,889 m (6,198 ft). The other ice cap covers an area of approximately 40 km^{2} (15 sq mi) and is centered at an unnamed summit at 44°30′S 72°19′W, at an elevation of 2,255 m (7,398 ft). The main ice cap borders the northernmost part of the Puyuhuapi Channel called Ventisquero Sound.

Cascada de Ventisquero Colgante, a large waterfall, is located in the park. As the meltwaters of the eponymous glacier proceed into the Témpanos River, they fall down the waterfall's single vertical drop.

Other attractions in the park are the Queulat Sound, Father García and The Cóndor Falls, and Cat's Stone (Piedra del Gato).

== Flora ==
A characteristic feature of this park is the presence of Valdivian temperate rain forests. Various portions of the park receive up to 4,000 mm (157 in) of precipitation annually. In this wet environment typical trees include coihue and tepa. The understory vegetation consists of species such as tepú, quila, chilco and nalca (a plant with enormous leaves). At higher elevations, the forests are dominated by coigüe de Magallanes and lenga. The Carretera Austral runs through the middle of the park and includes a stretch of hairpin turns (Cuesta Queulat), along which can be observed altitudinal zones of vegetation in the park.

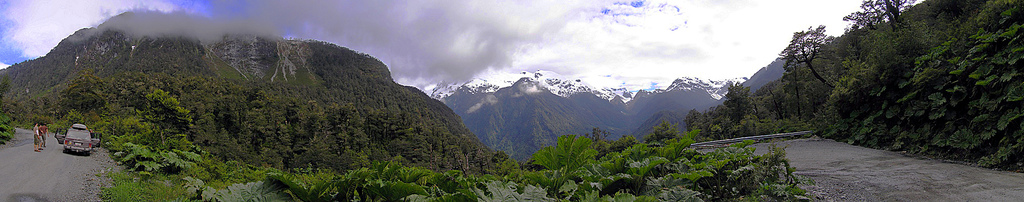
Cuesta Queulat - Queulat National Park.

== Fauna ==
In the southern portion of the park (Queulat mountain pass), wildlife includes mammals such as pudú, kodkod, and a variety of birds species including chucao tapaculo, Chilean pigeon, Magellanic woodpecker, black-throated huet-huet and thorn-tailed rayadito. The northern sections of the park are home to nearshore wildlife including semi-aquatic mammals as are southern river otter and coypu. Birds found in this area include Magellan goose, Chiloe wigeon, yellow-billed pintail, red shoveler, flying steamer duck, rosy-billed pochard, red-gartered coot, ringed kingfisher, great egret, cocoi heron, black-crowned night heron, torrent duck, sedge wren, Chilean flicker and black-necked swan.
