= Melimoyu =

Mountain in Chile

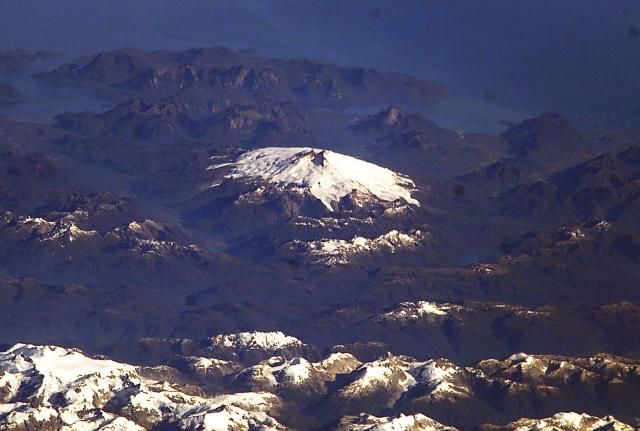
- Oblique view of Melimoyu from the International Space Station

Highest point
- Elevation: 2,400 m (7,900 ft)
- Prominence: 2,272 m (7,454 ft)
- Coordinates: 44°04′33″S 72°51′36″W

Geography
- Location within Chile
- Location: Chile
- Parent range: Andes

Geology
- Mountain type: Stratovolcano
- Last eruption: 200 CE ± 75 years

Melimoyu is a stratovolcano (Mapudungun meli="four"; the name means "four breasts".) in Chile. It is an elongated volcanic complex that contains two nested calderas of 1 kilometre (0.62 mi) and 8 kilometres (5.0 mi) width. An ice cap has developed on the volcano with a couple of outlet glaciers. Melimoyu has not erupted in recent times, but during the Holocene two large eruptions took place and ejected ash at large distances from the volcano.

== Geography and geomorphology ==
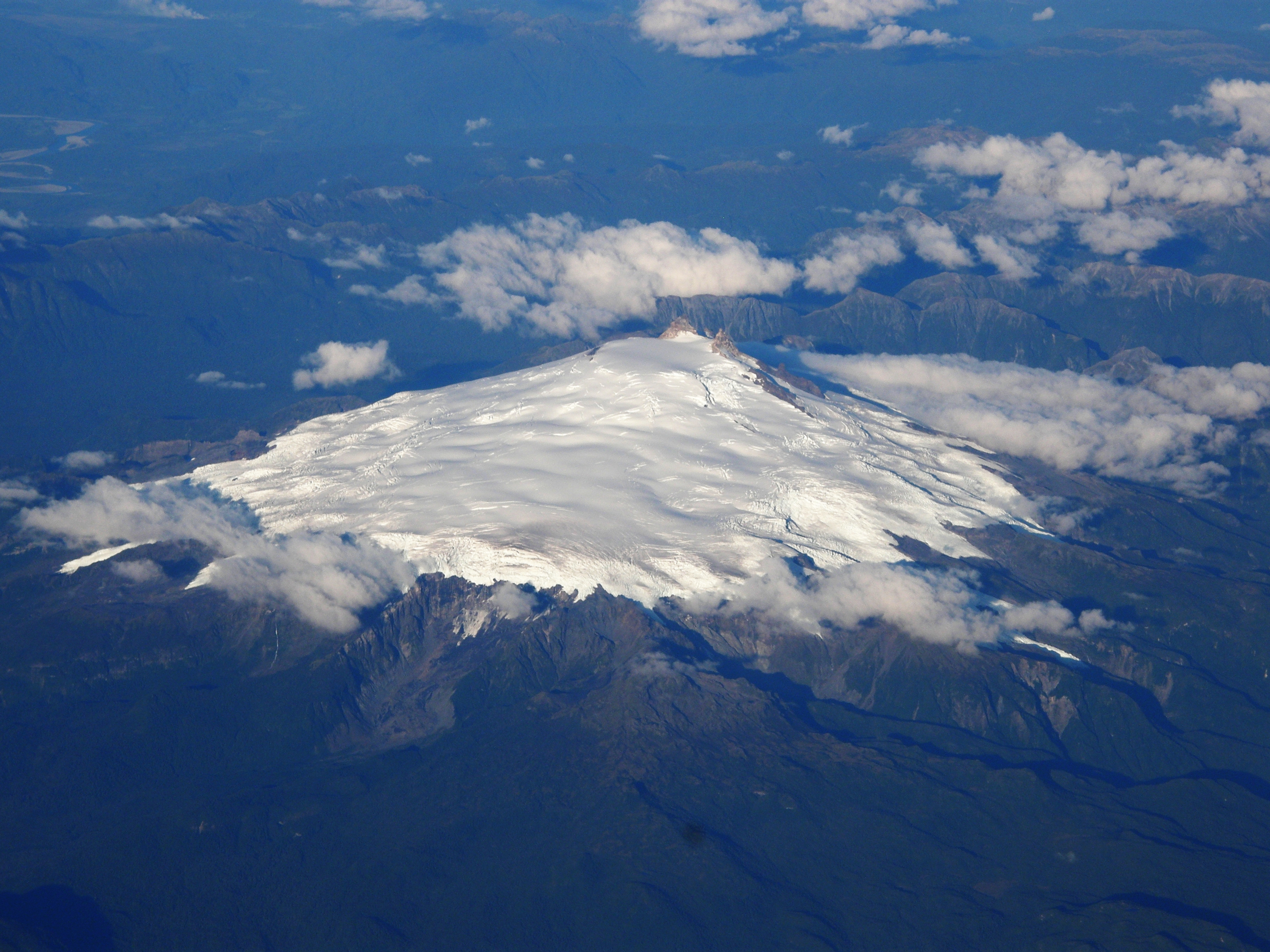
Melimoyu volcano seen from air towards the east.

Melimoyu is a remote volcano in Chile northwest of the town Puyuhuapi and northeast from the Moraleda Channel inlet. The volcano is about 2,400 metres (7,900 ft) high and 10 kilometres (6.2 mi) long, with an elongated shape. There are four summits, all principally created by phreatomagmatic activity and which conspicuously rise above the surrounding area and give the mountain its name. It is one of the larger volcanoes in the region. It bears an ice-filled summit caldera 1 kilometre (0.62 mi)-1.5 kilometres (0.93 mi)-1 kilometre (0.62 mi) wide as well as another, 8 kilometres (5.0 mi) wide caldera that is drained northeastward through a gap in the caldera rim. The volcano is mostly formed by lava flows and has a volume of about 142 cubic kilometres (34 cu mi), which is comparatively large.

Melimoyu displays a large ice cap which after shrinkage over the preceding few decades covered a surface area of 55.59 square kilometres (21.46 sq mi) through a retreat rate of about 0.61 square kilometres per year (0.0075 sq mi/Ms) between 1970-2017; said shrinkage also led to the retreat of outlet glaciers and the development of a proglacial lake. There are sixteen or seven glaciers on the mountain, clockwise from north they are named Glaciar Correntoso, Glaciar Melimoyu Este, Glaciar Marchant, Glaciar Melimoyu Sur, Glaciar Melimoyu Oeste, Glaciar Santo Domingo and Glaciar Anihue.

== Geology ==
This volcano together with Chaiten, Michinmahuida, Corcovado, Yanteles, Macá, Cay and Hudson is one of the volcanoes in the Southern Volcanic Zone which have been active during the Holocene and produced tephra deposits in the region. Volcanic activity in this 1,400 kilometres (870 mi) long volcanic belt is a result of the subduction of the Nazca Plate beneath the South America Plate.

The major Liquiñe-Ofqui Fault Zone has determined the position of a number of volcanic centres; it is a strike-slip fault that accommodates part of the relative movement between the Nazca and South America Plate. The position of Melimoyu is further controlled by a local fault system that runs parallel to the Liquiñe-Ofqui Fault, the Yanteles-Mentolat fault. Aside from Melimoyu, the volcanoes Mentolat and Yanteles, the Puerto Bonito hot springs as well as local bays and estuaries are influenced by this fault system. Beyond tectonic and volcanic phenomena, the Patagonian Ice Sheet has been active in the region, leaving lakes and fiords.

=== Composition ===
Tephras from Melimoyu range from basalt over andesite to dacite. They contain phenocrysts of plagioclase plus clinopyroxene and orthopyroxene, but also hornblende, olivine and quartz and less common amphibole and biotite.

== Climate ==
The climate at Melimoyu is cold and oceanic, with cold fronts from Antarctica, westerly winds and synoptic systems from the Pacific Ocean dominating the climate. Summers are short and cold and there is abundant precipitation with no dry season; where orographic enhancement occurs precipitation can reach 5 metres per year (200 in/year). Average temperatures are about 9.5–9 °C (49.1–48.2 °F).

== Eruption history ==
Two large Holocene eruptions have been identified at Melimoyu, called MEL1 and MEL2 and whose deposits are known as the La Junta and Santa Ana tephras respectively. The larger MEL1 eruption occurred between 2,790 – 2,740 years ago and produced a layered basaltic-dacitic tephra consisting of pumice with lithics and scoria inclusions. The MEL2 eruption took place about 1,680 ± 100 calibrated radiocarbon years ago and consists of pumice of andesitic composition. MEL1 deposits have thicknesses of 130–30 centimetres (51–12 in) depending on the layer at 30 kilometres (19 mi) distance of the volcano, while MEL2 units rech thicknesses of 50 centimetres (20 in) at the same distance.

At Palena Lake 115 kilometres (71 mi) east from Melimoyu the MEL1 layer is still 12 centimetres (4.7 in) thick. A 6 centimetres (2.4 in) thick tephra deposit at Lago Shaman and Mallín El Embudo in the Río Cisnes valley has been attributed to the MEL2 eruption. Other findings of tephra are MEL2 layers at Laguna Junco and Laguna Las Mellizas. Overall, both eruptions appear to have had a volcanic explosivity index of 5 and produced about 2.6 cubic kilometres (0.62 cu mi) and 1.6 cubic kilometres (0.38 cu mi) tephra for the MEL1 and MEL2 eruption, respectively. The compositions of the two tephras are different, with the MEL2 magma having formed possibly from leftover MEL1 magma. The MEL1 tephra is of basaltic trachyandesite to basaltic andesite composition and the MEL2 tephra is of trachydacite composition.

Other eruptions identified through tephra at Lago Shaman and Mallín El Embudo occurred 4,800 – 4,600 calibrated radiocarbon years ago, while a late glacial maximum eruption over 19,670 years before present produced another 6 centimetres (2.4 in) thick tephra layer in the Río Cisnes valley. Two additional tephra layers, 8,300 and especially one 19,700 years old, at Río Cisnes may also have originated at Melimoyu and deposits from the latter eruption may also be preserved in the Ñirehuao valley. Glacial activity has otherwise removed much of the record of volcanic activity before the post-glacial.

A 350 ± 200 CE eruption at Melimoyu deposited ash as far as Antarctica, where it was found in the Siple Dome. This eruption together with volcanic eruptions of Calbuco and Taupō in New Zealand induced noticeable cooling and increased snowfall in Australia. There are no recorded historical eruptions aside from occasional seismic events.

The Chaiten eruption in 2008 has highlighted the hazard that volcanoes constitute, and thus a number of volcanoes including Melimoyu are monitored with seismic stations. Local towns such as Puerto Cisnes may experience tephra falls in case of renewed volcanic activity at Melimoyu, while lahars and lava bombs would threaten the area directly surrounding the volcano.

== See also ==
- List of volcanoes in Chile
- List of Ultras of South America

== Sources ==
- Geoffroy, Carolina; Amigo, Alvaro; Castruccio, Angelo (October 2015). "Avances en la Caracterización Tefrocronol ógica de l a Actividad Explosiva Post – Glacial d el Volcán Melimoyu, Chile" (PDF). SERNAGEOMIN (in Spanish). La Serena: 14th Chilean Geological Congress. Archived from the original (PDF) on September 2, 2018.
- Geoffroy, C. A.; Alloway, B. V.; Amigo, À.; Parada, M. A.; Gutierrez, F.; Castruccio, A.; Pearce, N. J. G.; Morgado, E.; Moreno, P. I. (15 November 2018). "A widespread compositionally bimodal tephra sourced from Volcán Melimoyu (44°S, Northern Patagonian Andes): Insights into magmatic reservoir processes and opportunities for regional correlation". Quaternary Science Reviews. 200: 141–159. Bibcode:2018QSRv..200..141G. doi:10.1016/j.quascirev.2018.09.034. ISSN 0277-3791. S2CID 135036621.
- Idalino, Filipe Daros; Rosa, Kátia Kellem da; Acuña, Francisco Ferrando; Kozhikkodan Veettil, Bijeesh; Simões, Jefferson Cardia; Souza, Enoil (11 December 2018). "Recent glacier variations on Mount Melimoyu (44°50'S-72°51'W), Chilean Patagonia, using Sentinel-2 data". Geocarto International. 35 (11): 1199–1213. doi:10.1080/10106049.2018.1557262. S2CID 135066049.
- Rivera, Andrés; Bown, Francisca (August 2013). "Recent glacier variations on active ice capped volcanoes in the Southern Volcanic Zone (37°–46°S), Chilean Andes". Journal of South American Earth Sciences. 45: 345–356. Bibcode:2013JSAES..45..345R. doi:10.1016/j.jsames.2013.02.004. hdl:10533/130506. ISSN 0895-9811.
