= Lago Rosselot National Reserve =

Nature reserve in Aisén Region, Chile

- IUCN category IV (habitat/species management area)
- Location within Chile
- Location: Aysén del General Carlos Ibáñez del Campo Region, Chile
- Coordinates: 44°4′0″S 72°22′0″W
- Area: 127.25 km^{2} (49.13 sq mi)
- Designation: Forest reserve, national reserve
- Designated: 1983
- Governing body: Corporación Nacional Forestal (CONAF)

Lago Rosselot National Reserve is a nature reserve located immediately north of Queulat National Park and east of the Carretera Austral, in Aysén del General Carlos Ibáñez del Campo Region, Chile. It is named after Rosselot Lake. It consists of fishing and other water activities.
