= Puyuhuapi Airport =

- IATA: none; ICAO: SCPH

Summary
- Airport type: Public
- Serves: Puyuhuapi, Chile
- Elevation AMSL: 42 ft / 13 m
- Coordinates: 44°23′00″S 72°35′37″W

Map
- Location of Puyuhuapi Airport in Chile

Runways
Direction	Length		Surface
Direction	m	ft	Surface
18/36	1,025	3,363	Grass
- Source: Landings.com Google Maps GCM

Puyuhuapi Airport (Spanish: Aeropuerto de Puyuhuapi), (ICAO: SCPH) is an airport 7 kilometres (4.3 mi) south of Puyuhuapi, a small town at the head of a fjord in the Aysén Region of Chile. The airport is on land that projects into the fjord.

== See also ==
- Transport in Chile
- List of airports in Chile
