= Lago Verde, Chile =

Lago Verde
- Commune
- Map of the Commune of Lago Verde in Aisén Region Location in Chile
- Coordinates (commune): 44°14′S 71°50′W
- Country: Chile
- Region: Aysén
- Province: Coihaique
- Founded as: Villa La Tapera
- Founded: 1926

Government
  - Type: Municipality
  - Alcalde: Nelson Opazo López (UDI)

Area
  - Total: 5,622.3 km^{2} (2,170.8 sq mi)
- Elevation: 422 m (1,385 ft)

Population (2012 Census)
  - Total: 869
  - Density: 0.155/km^{2} (0.400/sq mi)
  - Urban: 0
  - Rural: 869
- Time zone: UTC-4 (CLT)
  - Summer (DST): UTC-3 (CLST)
- Area code: 56 + 67
- Climate: Cfb
- Website: Municipality of Lago Verde

Lago Verde is a Chilean commune located at the headwaters of the Cisnes River in Coyhaique Province, Aisén Region. The commune is administered by the municipality of Lago Verde, the principal settlement.

== History ==
At the time of European arrival, the indigenous people in the area were the Tehuelche, who were nomadic hunter gatherers, however, the area has been occupied since at least 2,800 BP, and likely back as far as the end of the last ice age (11,400 BP). Some Europeans settled in the area in the early twentieth century, beginning in 1914 there were settlers in the upper reaches of the Cisnes River. The grant for the estancia "Sociedad Ganadera Cisnes" of over 1,000 square kilometres (386 sq mi) was made in the early 1920s. It encompassed almost all of what is now the La Tapera district. Nonetheless, the area was not formally organized until the establishment of a settlement, Villa La Tapera, on 26 December 1926.

In 1936 land for the establishment of the town of Lago Verde was set aside. In 1950, a young Frenchman, Edward Simon. purchased several hectares in the town and established a hotel, the "Cacique Blanco", with the ranching and farming activities to support it. In 1966 Villa La Tapera achieved town status. In 1979 the commune of Lago Verde was created. In 1981 Lago Verde became a municipality. And in 1982 Villa Amengual was founded.

In 1992 the road to La Junta was completed with a bridge over the Rosselot River. This increased communications within the region.

== Demographics ==
Historical population
| Year | Pop. | ±% p.a. |
|---|---|---|
| 1970 | 980 | — |
| 1982 | 931 | −0.43% |
| 1992 | 1,168 | +2.29% |
| 2002 | 1,062 | −0.95% |
| 2017 | 852 | −1.46% |
| 2024 | 779 | −1.27% |
Source: "Censo de Población y Vivienda". National Statistics Institute.

According to the 2012 census of the National Statistics Institute, Lago Verde has 869 inhabitants, with an area of 5,622.3 km^{2} (2,171 sq mi) which makes the commune an entirely rural area. The population of the commune has been declining; it was 1,062 in the 2002 census, and 1,168 in the 1992 census.

== Administration ==
As a commune, Lago Verde is a third-level administrative division of Chile administered by a municipal council, headed by an alcalde who is directly elected every four years. The 2012-2016 alcalde is Nelson Opazo López. The previous governor was Gaspar Aldea Cadagán.

Within the electoral divisions of Chile, Lago Verde is represented in the Chamber of Deputies by René Alinco (PDC) and David Sandoval (UDI) as part of the 59th electoral district, which includes the entire Aisén Region. The commune is represented in the Senate by Antonio Horvath Kiss (RN) and Patricio Walker Prieto (PDC) as part of the 18th senatorial constituency (Aisén Region).

== Climate ==
Climate data for Lago Verde (Rio Cisnes), elevation 700 m (2,300 ft)
| Month | Jan | Feb | Mar | Apr | May | Jun | Jul | Aug | Sep | Oct | Nov | Dec | Year |
|---|---|---|---|---|---|---|---|---|---|---|---|---|---|
| Mean daily maximum °C (°F) | 18.4 (65.1) | 17.4 (63.3) | 15.2 (59.4) | 11.9 (53.4) | 8.1 (46.6) | 5.1 (41.2) | 4.3 (39.7) | 6.1 (43.0) | 9.2 (48.6) | 13.0 (55.4) | 15.6 (60.1) | 17.6 (63.7) | 11.8 (53.3) |
| Daily mean °C (°F) | 11.8 (53.2) | 10.4 (50.7) | 8.6 (47.5) | 6.2 (43.2) | 3.2 (37.8) | 0.6 (33.1) | 0.3 (32.5) | 0.9 (33.6) | 3.2 (37.8) | 6.3 (43.3) | 8.8 (47.8) | 10.9 (51.6) | 5.9 (42.7) |
| Mean daily minimum °C (°F) | 5.0 (41.0) | 4.2 (39.6) | 3.0 (37.4) | 1.6 (34.9) | −0.2 (31.6) | −2.4 (27.7) | −2.9 (26.8) | −2.5 (27.5) | −1.2 (29.8) | 0.3 (32.5) | 2.8 (37.0) | 4.3 (39.7) | 1.0 (33.8) |
| Average precipitation mm (inches) | 15.2 (0.60) | 16.3 (0.64) | 26.0 (1.02) | 36.4 (1.43) | 67.5 (2.66) | 48.2 (1.90) | 73.9 (2.91) | 74.0 (2.91) | 37.1 (1.46) | 18.0 (0.71) | 15.9 (0.63) | 23.7 (0.93) | 452.2 (17.8) |
Source: Meteorología Interactiva
