= Time in Chile =

Continental Chile Aysén Region and Magallanes and Chilean Antarctica Region Easter Island and Salas y Gómez The three time zones of Chile since 2017.

Chile is divided into three time zones. Most of Continental Chile uses the time offset UTC−04:00 in winter time and UTC−03:00 in summer time, while the Aysén Region and the Magallanes and Chilean Antarctica Region uses the time offset UTC−03:00 the whole year. Additionally, Easter Island uses the time offset UTC−06:00 in winter time and UTC−05:00 in summer time.

Until 2015, Continental Chile used the time offset UTC−04:00 and Easter Island used UTC−06:00 for standard time, with daylight saving time roughly between October and March every year. In January 2015, the Chilean government announced that the entire country would keep the time offset used during daylight saving time permanently. However, the annual time change was reinstated in 2016 after feedback from the public about an increase in truancy during the winter months, complaints about older computers and other electronic devices not using the right time zone, and fruit growers reporting a 15% loss in productivity.

Starting in 2016, Chile returned to UTC−04:00 for winter time for 3 months. Between 2016 and 2018, this began on the second Sunday of May and ended on the second Sunday of August; from 2019 onward, it will start on the first Sunday of April and end on the first Sunday of September. Since 2017, a new time zone in the Magallanes and Chilean Antarctica region has been implemented, giving two different times in Continental Chile for the first time.

== Time zones ==
- Continental Chile: UTC−3 in summer time and UTC−4 in winter time.

The winter time starts the first Saturday of April and ends on the first Saturday of September.

- Easter Island: UTC−5 in summer time and UTC−6 in winter time.

It has 2 hours of difference from the Continental time and changes the same days.

- Magallanes and Chilean Antarctica: It uses the summer time (UTC−3) the whole year. This time zone has been implemented since 2017. Aysén region has also joined this time zone in 2025.

== Current time zone ==
The official time on the mainland is now UTC−04:00, in the Magallanes and Chilean Antarctica Region is UTC−03:00, and on Easter Island is UTC−06:00.

== Defunct time zones ==
=== Standard time (CLT/EAST) ===
Standard time in Chile was used in Chile until 2014 (returned 2016). The time zone Chile Standard Time (CLT) was used on the mainland with the offset UTC−04:00 and Easter Island Standard Time (EAST) was used on Easter Island with the offset UTC−06:00.

On March 1, 1894, the first official time signal operates in Valparaíso at -4 hours, 46 minutes and 34 seconds with respect to GMT, as UTC did not exist.

In 1903, another official time was operating in Coquimbo. It was synchronized at -4 hours, 45 minutes 20.7 seconds with respect to GMT.

On January 10, 1910, Chile adopted GMT-5 as its official time.

On July 1, 1919, time was set as 4 hours 42 minutes 46.3 seconds behind Greenwich.

=== Summer time (CLST/EASST) ===
Summer time in Chile, also known as daylight saving time (DST) in Chile was used in Chile from 1968 to 2014, discontinued in 2015, and reinstated in 2016. The time zone Chile Summer Time (CLST) was used on the mainland with the offset UTC−03:00 and Easter Island Summer Time (EASST) was used on Easter Island with the offset UTC−05:00. In mainland Chile, time was changed at 24:00 on a Saturday, i.e. at 0:00 on the following Sunday. In Easter Island, time was changed at 22:00 on a Saturday. In 2015, the time offset used in this time zone eventually became the only time zone in Chile.

Presidential decree of August 2022

Summer time 2023: From the Sunday after the first Saturday of September 2023 to the Sunday after the first Saturday of April 2024. The official time is advanced 60 minutes. The official time moves forward 60 minutes during this period and goes back in April.

Summer time 2024: From the Sunday after the first Saturday of September 2024 to the Sunday after the first Saturday of April 2025. The official time is advanced 60 minutes. The official time moves forward 60 minutes during this period and goes back in April.

Summer time 2025: From the Sunday after the first Saturday of September 2025 to the Sunday after the first Saturday of April 2026. The official time is advanced 60 minutes. The official time moves forward 60 minutes during this period and goes back in April.

Several exceptions have been decreed to the current rule that began in 1968:

- In 1987, the daylight saving time was extended until Saturday 11 April to accommodate a visit by Pope John Paul II
- In 1988, daylight saving time began a week early, to have more light for the Chilean national plebiscite of 5 October
- In 1990, daylight saving time was extended to 17 March, because Patricio Aylwin began his presidential period on 11 March
- In 1990, daylight saving time began at the end of 15 September, in order to save electricity due to unfavorable hydrological conditions
- In 1997, standard time began at the end of 29 March, in order to cope with unfavorable hydrological conditions
- In 1999, daylight saving time was extended to the first Saturday of April, due to a severe drought
- In 2008, daylight saving time was extended 3 weeks, due to a severe drought
- Due to the 2010 Chile earthquake, daylight saving time ended at 0:00 of 4 April on Continental Chile (22:00 Saturday 3rd on Easter Island)
- In 2011, the government decided to end daylight saving on the Sunday after the first Saturday of April. Later this was postponed to the Sunday after the first Saturday of May.
- On February 15, 2013, DST was extended to the last Sunday of April and started DST on the 2nd Sunday of September. These dates would be nearly the exact dates of North America's DST, reversed to the southern hemisphere, but the DST end date is 1 week early.
- In 2015, the summer time was implemented the whole year.
- In 2016, the change to winter time was restored.
- In 2017, the Magallanes and Chilean Antarctica region began to have its own time zone, using summer time (UTC−3) the whole year.
- In 2022, the start of Daylight Saving was delayed by 1 week, from 4 to 11 September. The delay was made because the original day coincided with the Constitutional Convention's exit plebiscite.

== IANA time zone database ==
Zones for Chile as given in the file zone.tab of the IANA time zone database.

c.c.	coordinates	TZ	Comments	UTC offset	DST	Notes
CL	−3327−07040	America/Santiago	most of Chile	−04:00	−03:00	Continental Chile - Every region but the Zona Austral
CL	−4534−07204	America/Coyhaique	Aysén Region	−03:00	−03:00	Aysén
CL	−5309−07055	America/Punta_Arenas	Magallanes Region	−03:00	−03:00	Magallanes and Chilean Antarctica
CL	−2709−10926	Pacific/Easter	Easter Island	−06:00	−05:00	Easter Island & Salas y Gómez

== See also ==
- Time in Argentina
- Time in Paraguay
- Time in Uruguay
