= Puerto Gala =

Puerto Gala Gala
- Location within Chile
- Coordinates: 44.257524°S 73.209253°W
- Region: Aysén
- Province: Aysén
- Municipality: Cisnes
- Commune: Cisnes

Government
  - Type: Municipal
- Time zone: UTC−04:00 (Chilean Standard)
  - Summer (DST): UTC−03:00 (Chilean Daylight)
- Area code: Country + town = 56 + 67

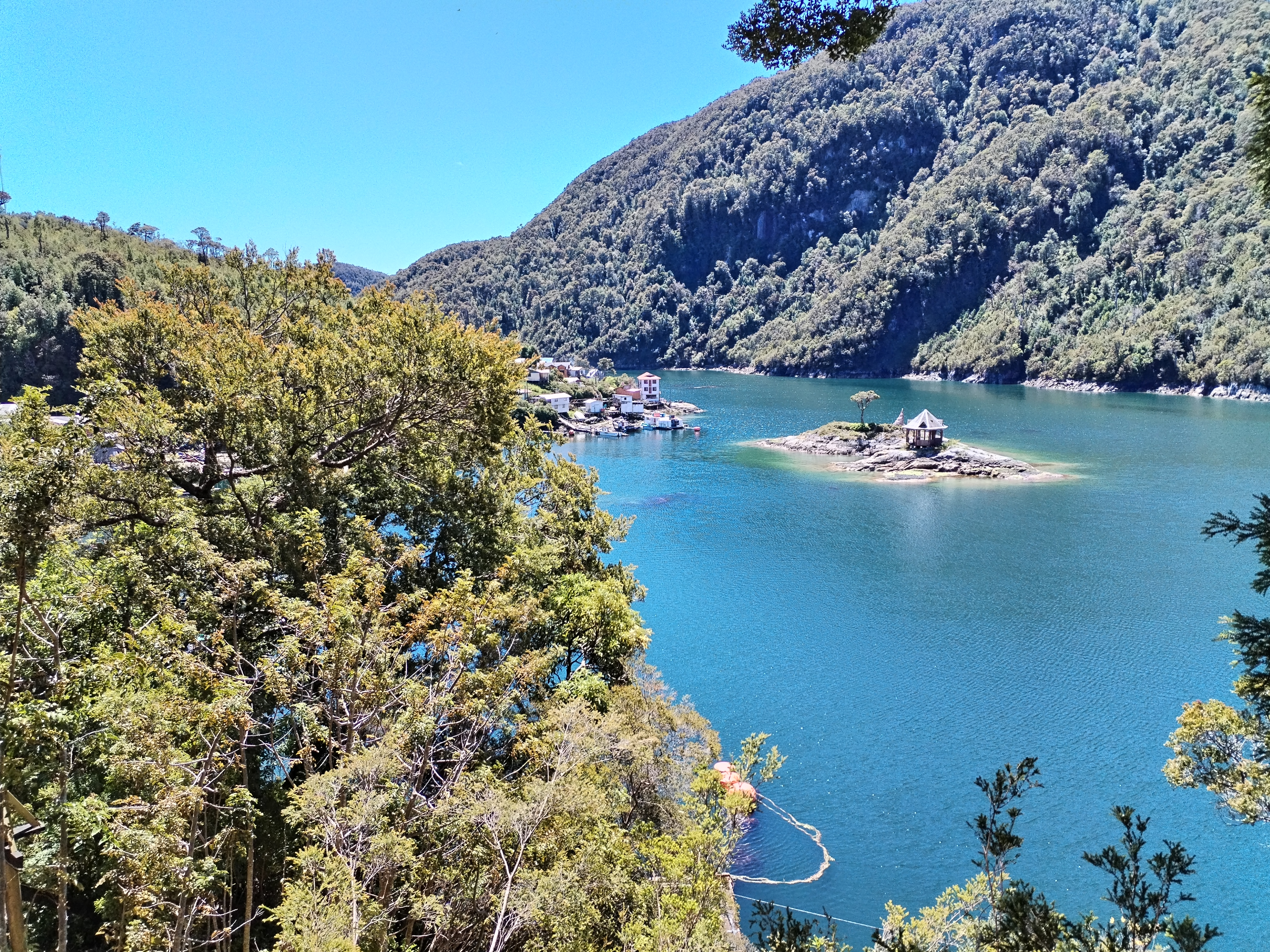
Puerto Gala

Puerto Gala or Gala is a hamlet and fishing community in Toto Island, southern Chile. It is located at the meeting point of Jacaf Channel with Moraleda Channel. The hamlet was established consequence of the merluza boom of the late 1980s. Some early settlers arrived to Gala escaping persecution from the military dictatorship of Pinochet as they lacked the resources to flee abroad. Other early settlers were delinquents who feared torture or death by the authorities. There was a distinct lack of rule of law in the first decades of existence, with police being unable to prevent theft or murder limiting themselves to recover corpses. Because of this police attempted to dissolve the settlement by threatening to evict settlers under the pretext that the settlements were illegal. Evictions attempts failed in the end.

As the merluza boom unraveled, artisan fishermen of Puerto Gala and Puerto Gaviota came into conflict with industrial fisheries. Overexploitation led eventually the government to put a ban on merluza fishing leading to unemployment and the return to Chiloé of some settlers.
