= Pico River =

Pico River Río Pico
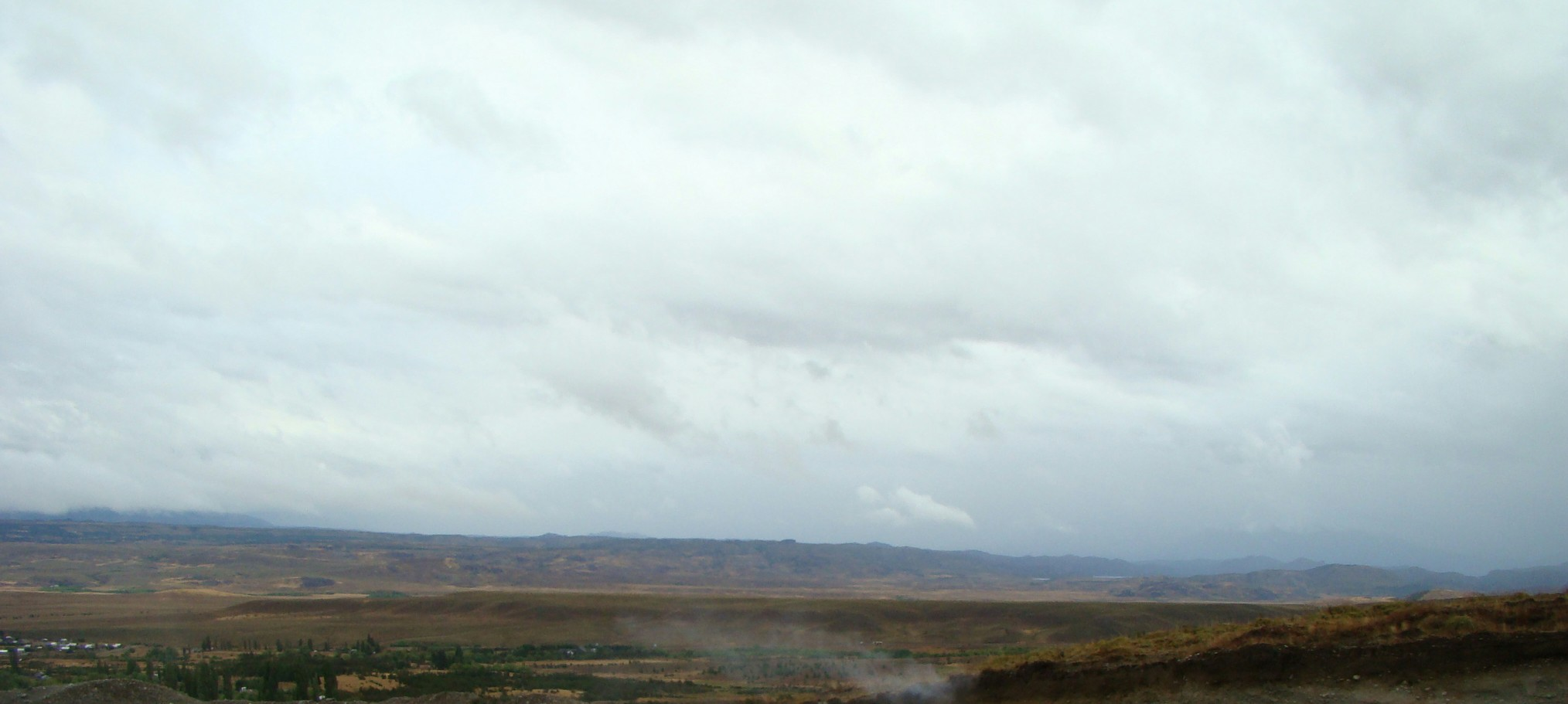

Location
- Countries: Argentina; Chile

Physical characteristics
- Source
  - location: Andes, Patagonia, Argentina
  - coordinates: 44°11′57″S 71°17′10″W
- Mouth: Figueroa River
  - location: El Manzanito, Chile
  - coordinates: 44°13′05″S 71°57′25″W
  - elevation: 400 m (1,300 ft)

Basin features
- Tributaries
  - left: Río Tromencó, Río de las Mulas, Río Campamento, Río Blanco O Pildoras
  - right: Río Justino, Pampa River, Nevados River

The Pico River is a binational river of Patagonian Argentina and Chile. It is a tributary of the Figueroa River which it enters near El Manzanito in Chile. The Pico Rivers arises at the confluence of the Río Tromencó and the Río de las Mulas in Tehuelches Department, Chubut Province, Argentina, about 5.5 kilometres (3.4 mi) east-southeast of the village of Río Pico and about 40 kilometres (25 mi) east of the Chilean border. The river was named in honour of the engineer Octavio Pico y Burgess (1837–1892), who headed the Boundary Commission that settled the border conflict between Argentina and Chile.

== See also ==
- List of rivers of Argentina

== Notes and references ==
- Rand McNally, The New International Atlas, 1993.
