= Cerro Macá =

Mountain in Chile

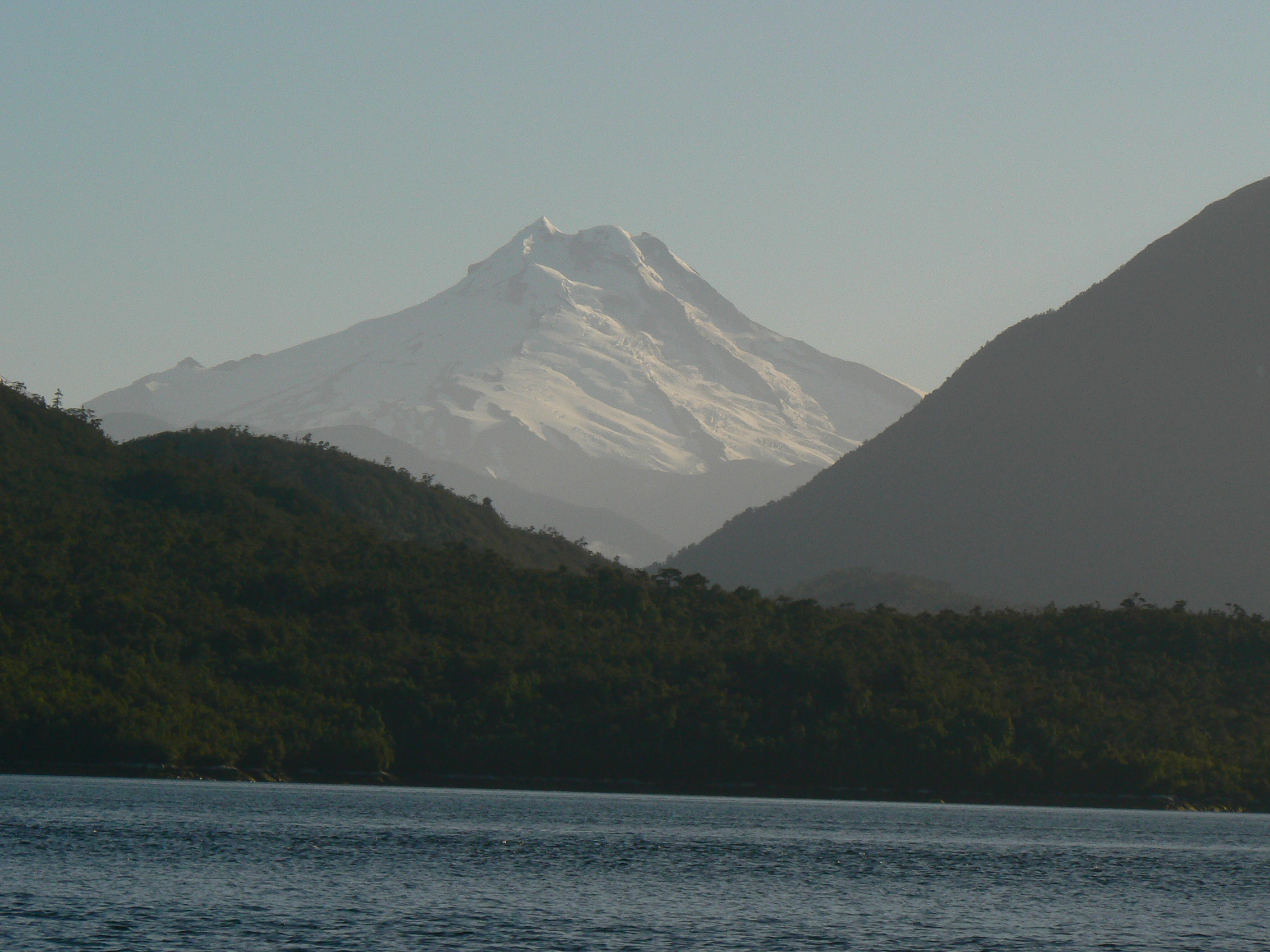

Highest point
- Elevation: 2,300 m (7,500 ft)
- Prominence: 2,066 m (6,778 ft)
- Listing: Ultra
- Coordinates: 45°06′21″S 73°10′09″W

Geography
- Location within Chile
- Location: Chile
- Parent range: Andes

Geology
- Mountain type: Stratovolcano
- Last eruption: 1560 ± 110 years

Cerro Macá is a stratovolcano located to the north of the Aisén Fjord and to the east of the Moraleda Channel, in the Aysén del General Carlos Ibáñez del Campo Region of Chile. This glacier-covered volcano lies along the regional Liquiñe-Ofqui Fault Zone.

Cerro Macá is a relatively small volcano with a volume of only 39 cubic kilometres (9.4 cu mi). It has a summit elevation of approximately 2,300 m above sea level and features glaciers that in 2011 covered an area of 27.62 square kilometres (10.66 sq mi). The edifice is partially eroded and a sector collapse is probably the origin of a large steep sided depression in the summit area. Pyroclastic cones with associated lava flows are found on its southwestern flank but also on the other slopes of the volcano, as far down as sea level and in the Bahia Aysen.

The volcano is part of the southernmost Southern Volcanic Zone of Chile, where volcanism is caused by the subduction of the Nazca Plate. Other volcanoes in the area are Melimoyu, Mentolat, Cay and Cerro Hudson. Macá specifically is formed by basalt and basaltic andesite.

1,440 ± 40 calibrated radiocarbon years ago a moderate explosive eruption deposited the MAC1 tephra, which reaches thicknesses of 10–15 centimetres (3.9–5.9 in) 70 kilometres (43 mi) east of Macá. Ash from past eruptions has been tentatively identified close to Cochrane Lake. A more recent eruption occurred from the Bahía Pérez cinder cone on the southwestern flank in 1560 ± 110 years.

In the early 20th century volcanic activity was observed at Ensenada Pérez, close to the southwestern flank of Macá.

== See also ==
- List of volcanoes in Chile
- List of Ultras of South America
