= Puerto Gaviota =

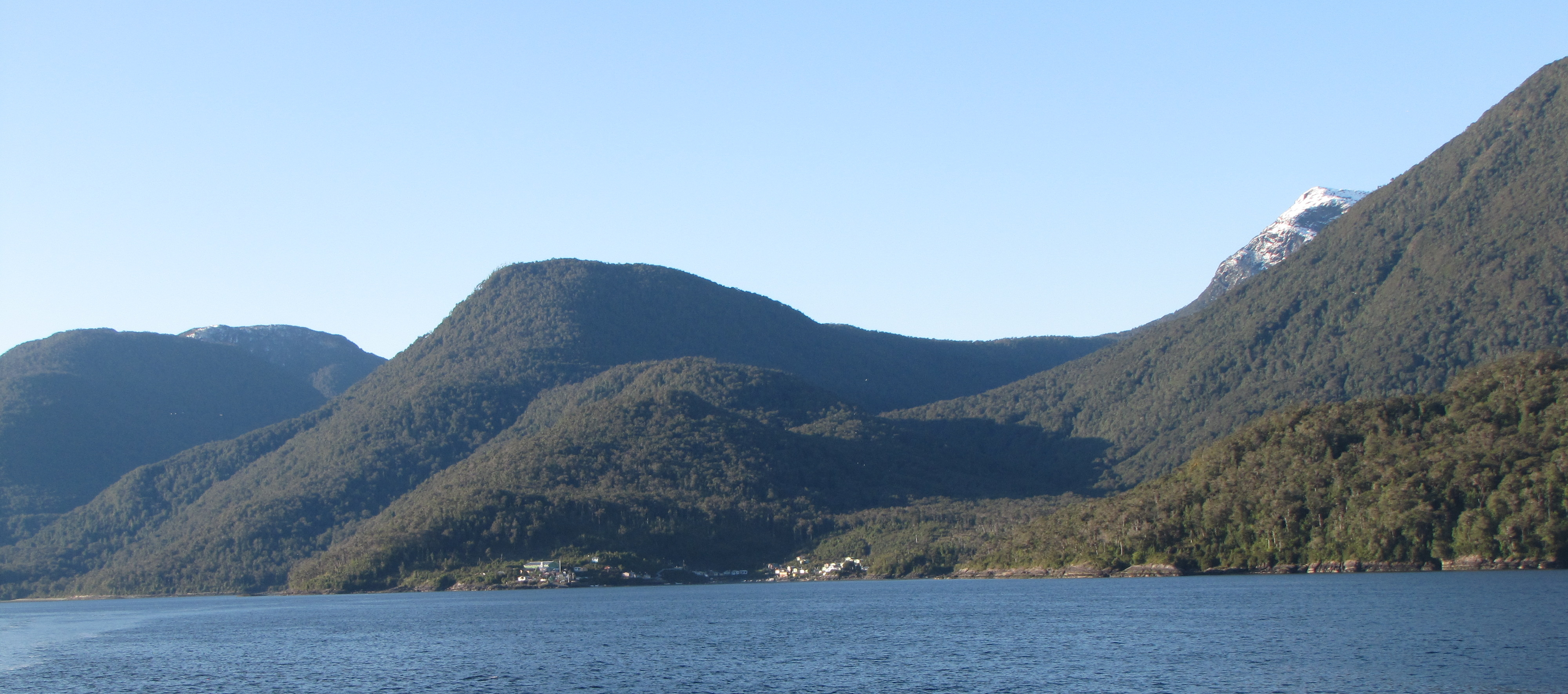
- Puerto Gaviota as seen in 2015

- Location within Chile
- Coordinates: 44°53′49.13″S 73°18′12.72″W
- Region: Aysén
- Province: Aysén
- Municipality: Cisnes
- Commune: Cisnes

Government
  - Type: Municipal

Population (2017)
  - Total: 65
- 49 male, 16 female
- Time zone: UTC−04:00 (Chilean Standard)
  - Summer (DST): UTC−03:00 (Chilean Daylight)
- Area code: Country + town = 56 + 67

Puerto Gaviota (lit. Port Seagull) is a village and fishing community in the Magdalena Island, southern Chile. It is located in the southwestern part of the island at the meeting point of Puyuhuapi Channel with Moraleda Channel. The village emerged as consequence of the codfish boom of the 1980s.

Some early settlers arrived escaping persecution from the military dictatorship of Pinochet as they lacked the resources to escape abroad. Other early settlers were delinquents who feared torture or death by the authorities.

As the codfish boom unraveled the artisan fishermen of Puerto Gaviota and Puerto Gala came into conflict with industrial fishing. Overexploitation led eventually the government to put a ban on codfish fishing. The ban caused unemployment and the return to mainland Chile of some settlers.

As of 2002 the village had a population of 117 inhabitants, 80 male and 37 female, by 2017 the population had declined to 65, 49 male and 16 female.
