= Magdalena Island, Aysén Region =

Island in the Aysén Region, Chile

Magdalena Island
Native name: Isla Magdalena (Región de Aisén)
- Location within Chile

Geography
- Coordinates: 44°35′44″S 73°11′25″W
- Adjacent to: Pacific Ocean
- Area: 2,025 km^{2} (782 sq mi)
- Coastline: 435.5 km (270.61 mi)
- Highest elevation: 5,450 ft (1661 m)
- Highest point: Mentolat

Administration
- Chile
- Region: Aisén

Additional information
- NGA UFI=-891257

Magdalena Island is an island in Aysén Region of southern Chile. The island is located between the Moraleda Channel and the Puyuhuapi Channel, and belongs partially to the Isla Magdalena National Park. The United States Hydrographic Office assigns four different names for this island: Isla de Cay, Isla Desierto, Isla Magdalena, and Isla de Motalat.

This large island extends into the continental coast, from which it is divided by the channels just mentioned. In its central part the extinct volcano Montalat rises to a height of 5,446 feet. The crater is at all times full of snow. In. the west coast of the island is Pangal Inlet, which is of no use to navigation. Five miles farther north of this is Senec Island, low and sloping, forming a good day mark, which should be left to the eastward in passing.

The fishing community and hamlet of Puerto Gaviota is located in the southwestern part of the island at the meeting point of Puyuhuapi Channel with Moraleda Channel.

== See also ==
- List of islands of Chile
