= Cisnes =

- Commune
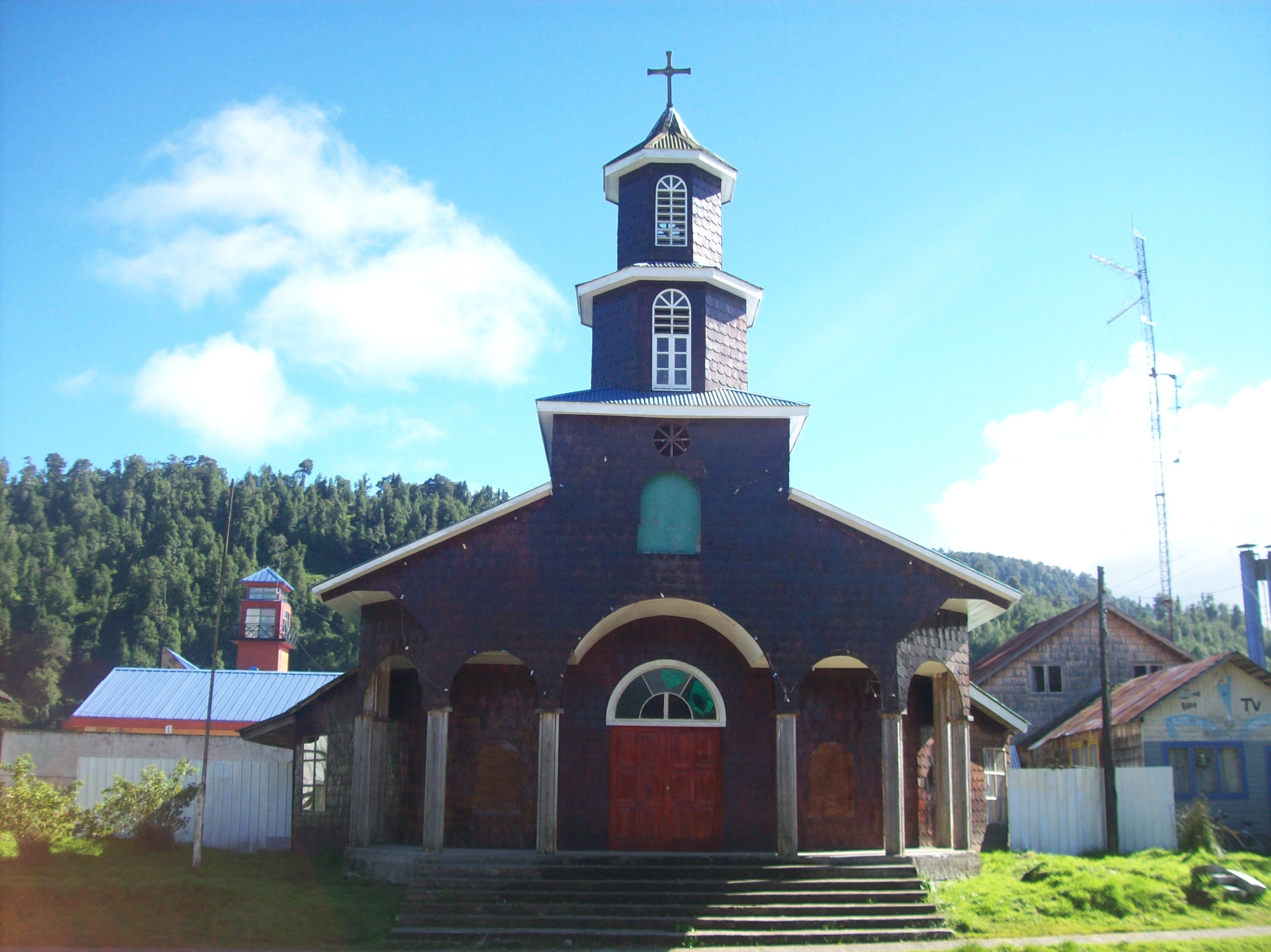
- Church of Puerto Cisnes

- Seal Location of Cisnes commune in the Aysén del General Carlos Ibáñez del Campo Region Location in Chile
- Coordinates: 44°45′S 72°42′W
- Country: Chile
- Region: Aisén
- Province: Aisén

Government
  - Type: Municipality
  - Alcalde: Luis Arsenio Valdés Gutiérrez (PS)

Area
  - Total: 15,831.4 km^{2} (6,112.5 sq mi)
- Elevation: 2 m (6.6 ft)

Population (2012 Census)
  - Total: 4,964
  - Density: 0.3136/km^{2} (0.8121/sq mi)
  - Urban: 2,507
  - Rural: 3,232

Sex
  - Men: 3,414
  - Women: 2,325
- Time zone: UTC-4 (CLT)
  - Summer (DST): UTC-3 (CLST)
- Area code: 56 + 67
- Website: www.municipalidadpalena.cl

Cisnes (Spanish for: "swans") is a Chilean commune located in the Aysén Province, Aysén del General Carlos Ibáñez del Campo Region. The commune spans an area of 15,831.4 km^{2} (6,113 sq mi).

== Demographics ==
Historical population
Year	Pop.	±% p.a.
1970	2,143	—
1982	3,293	+3.64%
1992	5,353	+4.98%
2002	5,739	+0.70%
2017	6,517	+0.85%
2024	5,137	−3.34%
Source: "Censo de Población y Vivienda". National Statistics Institute.

According to data from the 2002 Census of Population and Housing, Cisnes had 5,353 inhabitants; of these, 2,507 (43.7%) lived in urban areas and 3,232 (56.3%) in rural areas. At that time, there were 3,414 men and 2,325 women.

== Administration ==
As a commune, Cisnes is a third-level administrative division of Chile administered by a municipal council, headed by an alcalde who is directly elected every four years. The 2008–2012 alcalde (mayor) is Luis Valdés Gutiérrez (PS).

Within the electoral divisions of Chile, Cisnes is represented in the Chamber of Deputies by René Alinco (PDC) and David Sandoval (UDI) as part of the 59th electoral district, which includes the entire Aysén del General Carlos Ibáñez del Campo Region. The commune is represented in the Senate by Antonio Horvath Kiss (RN) and Patricio Walker Prieto (PDC) as part of the 18th senatorial constituency (Aysén del General Carlos Ibáñez del Campo Region).
