= Puyuhuapi Channel =

South American sea channel

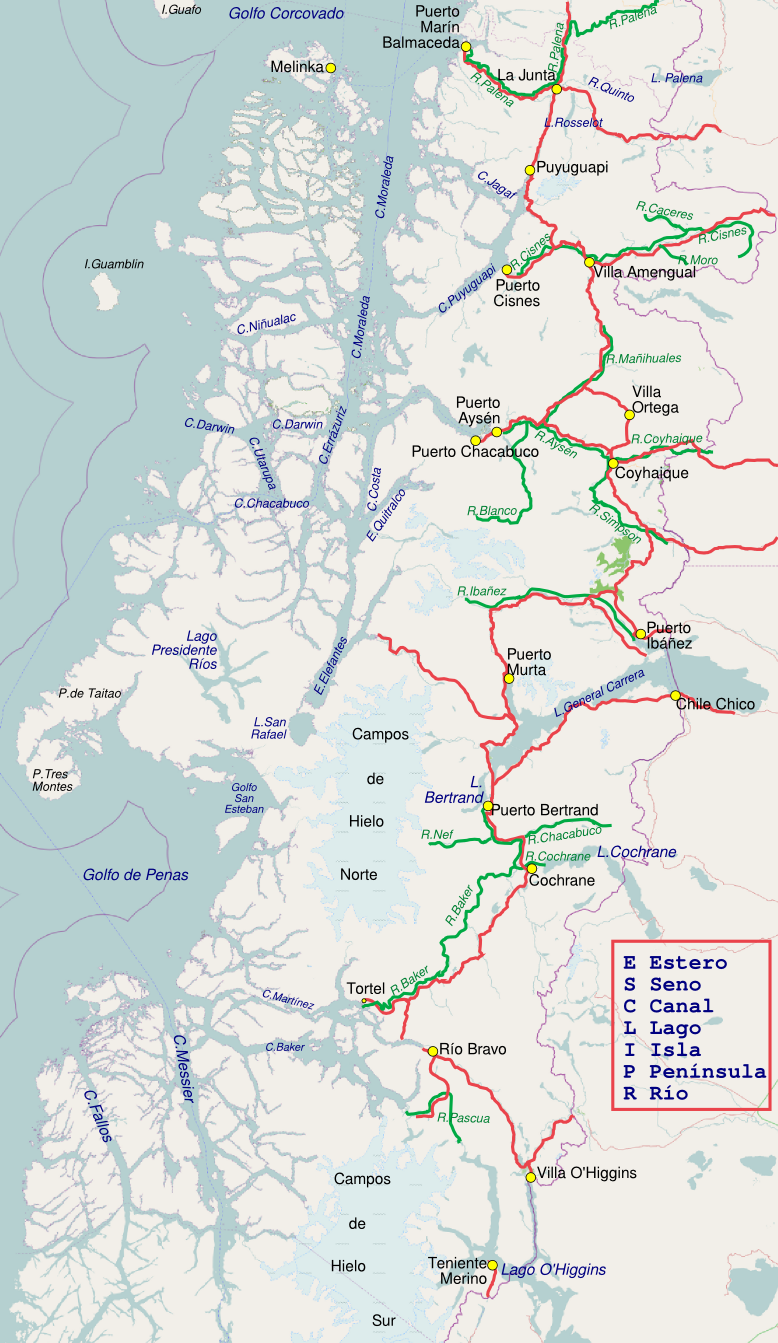
Puyuhuapi Channel in the Aysén Region

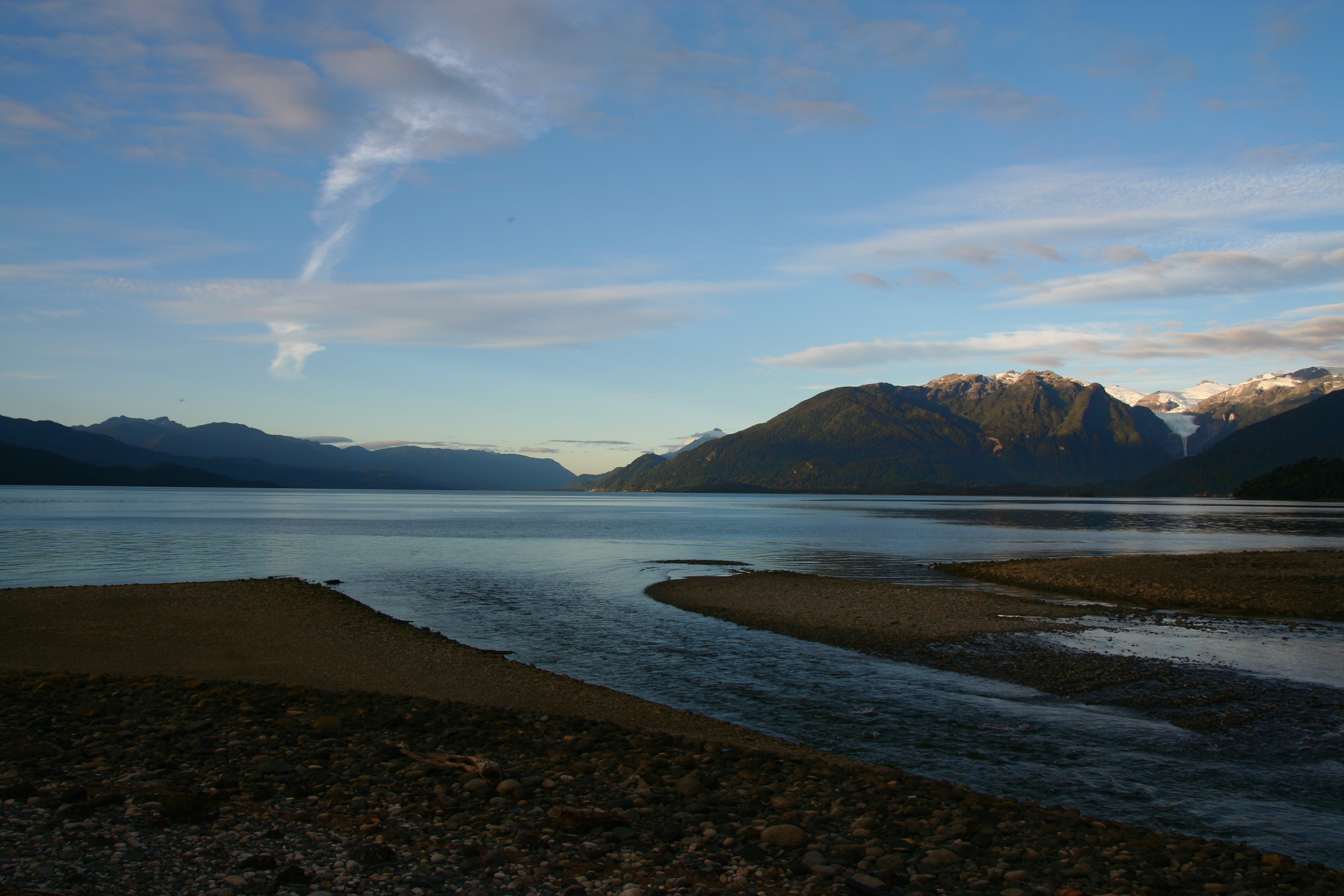
Puyuhuapi Channel

Puyuhuapi (from the Mapudungun puye, small fish and huapi, island), also Cai Channel (NGA UFI=-897934) is a sea channel separating Magdalena Island from the mainland of Aysén del General Carlos Ibáñez del Campo Region in Chile. The channel runs from Puyuhuapi in the north to the Moraleda Channel in the south.

== See also ==
- List of fjords, channels, sounds and straits of Chile
