= Puyuhuapi =

Village in Chile

Coordinates: 44°19′29″S 72°33′28″W

- Town (Pueblo)
- Interactive map of Puyuhuapi
- Country: Chile
- Region: Aysén
- Province: Aysén
- Commune: Cisnes
- Established: 8

Population (2007)
  - Total: 826

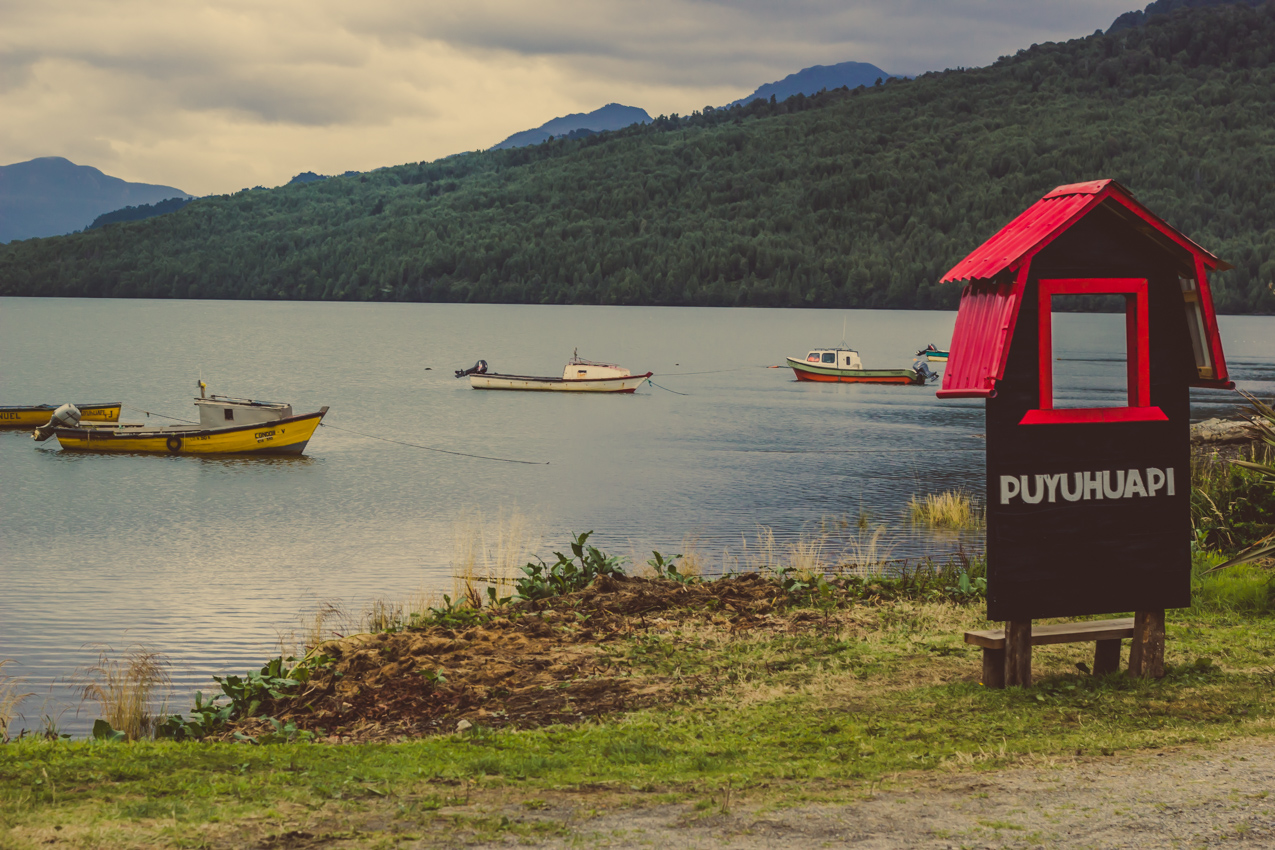
Puyuhuapi Harbor

Puyuhuapi (Puyuguapi) is a village in southern Chile in the Aysén Region. It is located on Route 7, the Carretera Austral, where the Rio Pascal enters the head of the Puyuhuapi fjord, a small fjord off the Ventisquero Sound. Its harbor on the fjord is called Puerto Puyuhuapi. Puyuhuapi is administratively in the Chilean commune of Cisnes. In the 2002 census it had a population of 535, but by 2007 it had grown to 826. Just southwest of the village are the Puyuhuapi hot springs. The government invited German settlement in the village, which was founded by Sudeten German settlers from Hranice (former German name Rossbach) in present-day Czech Republic and Mapuches from Chiloé Archipelago. German settlers gave temporary work to the Mapuches in the area, and then they settled with their families, which gave rise to a mestizo population.

It is served by Puyuhuapi Airport.

Among the local handicrafts are hand-made jerseys.

== In popular culture ==
Puyuhuapi was featured in the 2014 Patagonia Special episode of Top Gear, and in 2019 on DW News's documentary "On route 7 into the heart of Patagonia".
