= Cisnes River =

Coordinates: 44°44′52″S 72°42′20″W

Cisnes River (Río Cisnes)
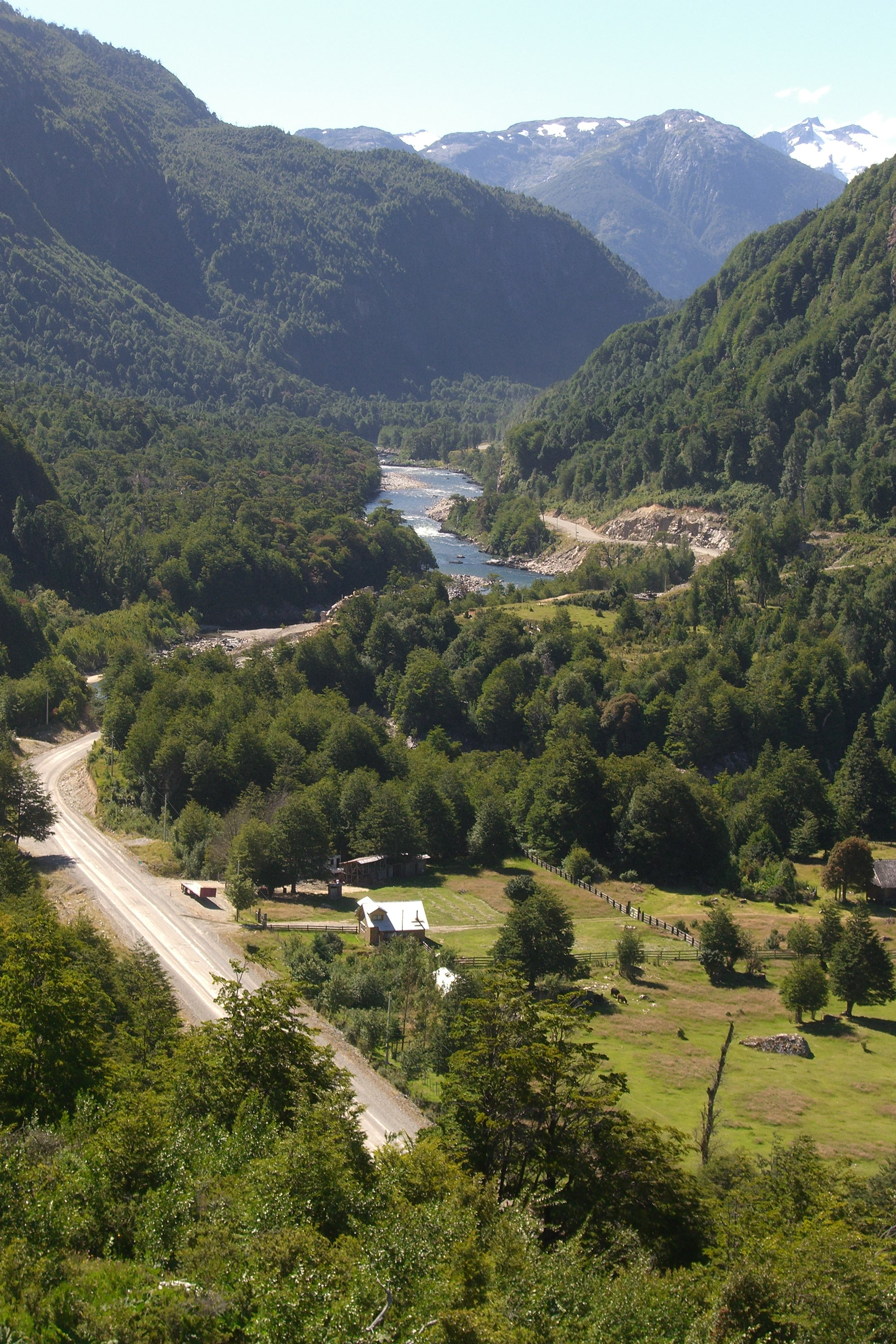
- From a lookout point at the Carretera Austral, which is also visible in the photo

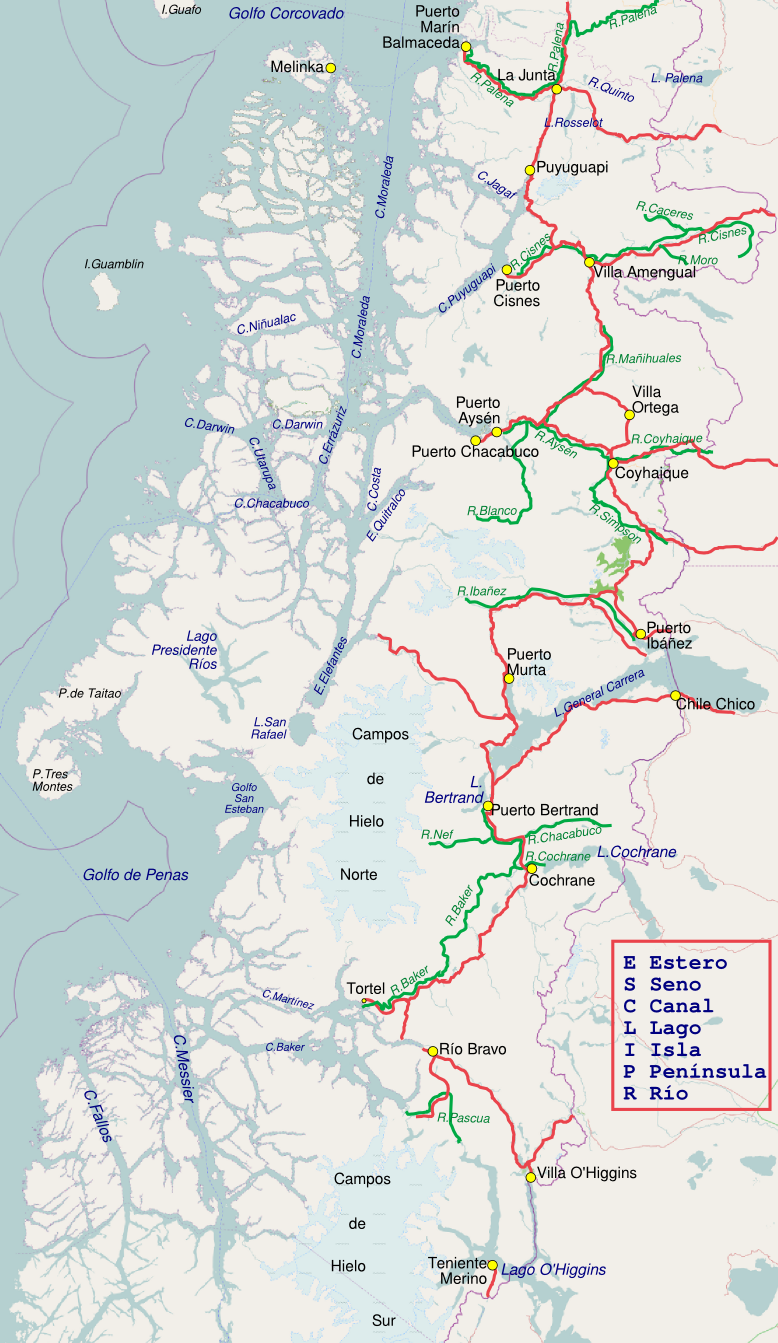
- Cisnes River in the Aysén Region

Location
- Country: Chile

Physical characteristics
- Mouth
  - location: Puyuhuapi Channel, Pacific Ocean
- Length: 160 km (99 mi)
- Basin size: 5,464 km^{2} (2,110 sq mi)
- Discharge
  - average: 700 m^{3}/s (25,000 cu ft/s)

The Cisnes River (Spanish for swan) is a river located in the Aysén del General Carlos Ibáñez del Campo Region of the Chilean Patagonia. It runs in east-west direction from the mountains near the border to Argentina and empties into the Pacific Ocean, near the town of Puerto Cisnes at Puyuhuapi Channel. Its characteristic turquoise-blue color is due to the glacial sediments deposited in it. Moro River and Pinchado River are some of the major tributaries of the river.

== Climate ==
Cisnes river has a Mediterranean continental climate with warm summers (Dsb, according to the Köppen climate classification), since at least 4 months have an average temperature above 10 °C (50 °F) and at least one month has an average temperature below 0 °C (32 °F), using the threshold of -3 °C its climate would be Mediterranean subalpine (Csc).

Climate data for Río Cisnes (1987–2013)
| Month | Jan | Feb | Mar | Apr | May | Jun | Jul | Aug | Sep | Oct | Nov | Dec | Year |
|---|---|---|---|---|---|---|---|---|---|---|---|---|---|
| Mean daily maximum °C (°F) | 20.0 (68.0) | 21.7 (71.1) | 17.3 (63.1) | 12.3 (54.1) | 8.2 (46.8) | 5.3 (41.5) | 4.2 (39.6) | 6.1 (43.0) | 9.8 (49.6) | 12.2 (54.0) | 15.5 (59.9) | 18.6 (65.5) | 12.6 (54.7) |
| Daily mean °C (°F) | 12.5 (54.5) | 13.5 (56.3) | 10.4 (50.7) | 6.4 (43.5) | 2.8 (37.0) | 0.0 (32.0) | −0.5 (31.1) | 1.5 (34.7) | 4.9 (40.8) | 7.2 (45.0) | 9.6 (49.3) | 11.7 (53.1) | 6.7 (44.0) |
| Mean daily minimum °C (°F) | 5.1 (41.2) | 5.3 (41.5) | 3.5 (38.3) | 0.4 (32.7) | −2.7 (27.1) | −5.3 (22.5) | −5.1 (22.8) | −3.2 (26.2) | −0.1 (31.8) | 2.2 (36.0) | 3.7 (38.7) | 4.7 (40.5) | 0.7 (33.3) |
| Average precipitation mm (inches) | 19 (0.7) | 14 (0.6) | 39 (1.5) | 21 (0.8) | 43 (1.7) | 44 (1.7) | 41 (1.6) | 38 (1.5) | 27 (1.1) | 19 (0.7) | 18 (0.7) | 20 (0.8) | 342 (13.5) |
Source: Atlas Agroclimatico de Chile

== See also ==
- List of rivers of Chile
