= Moraleda Channel =

Body of Water in Southern Chile

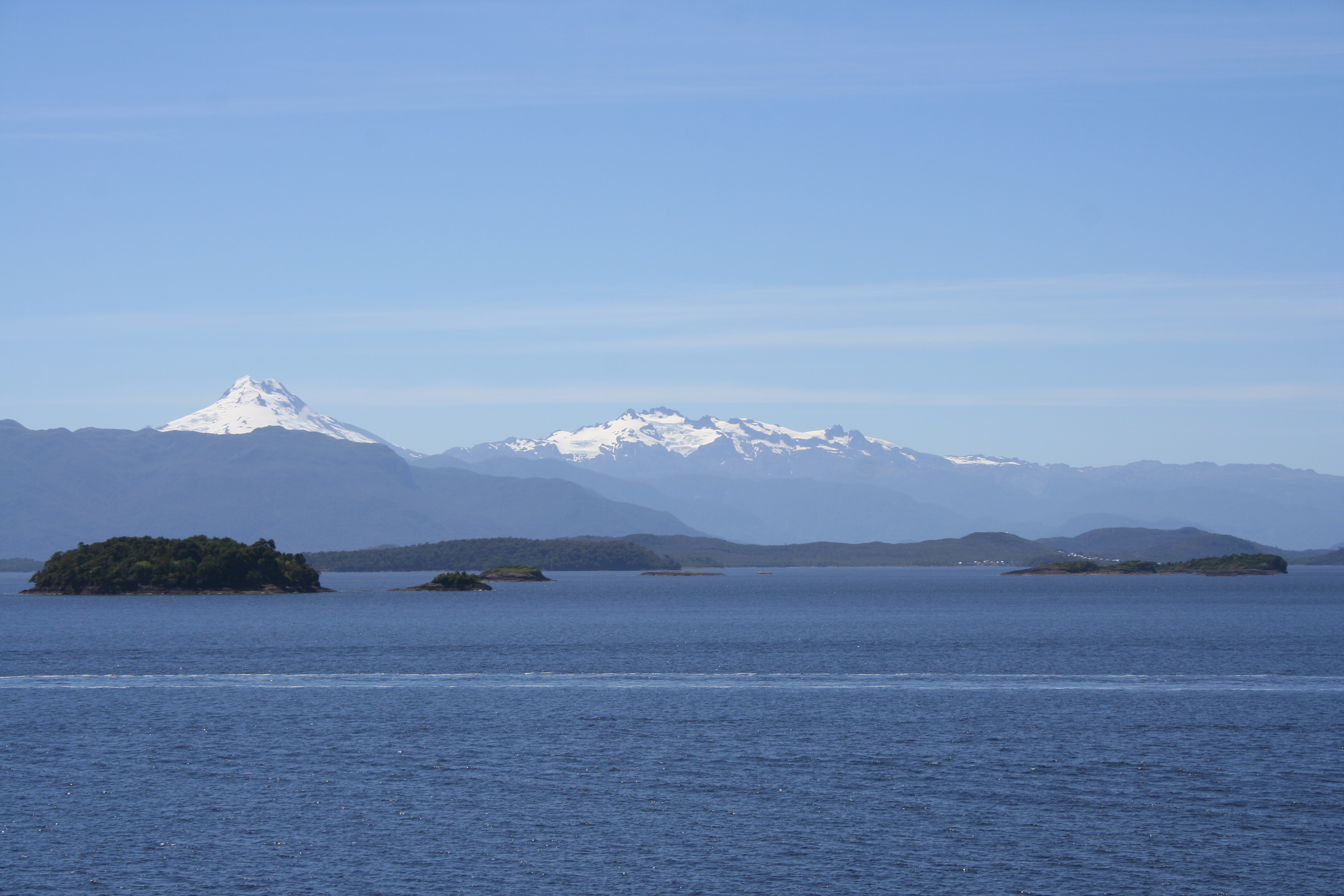
- Canal Moraleda with Cerro Macá in the distance.

- Location within Chile

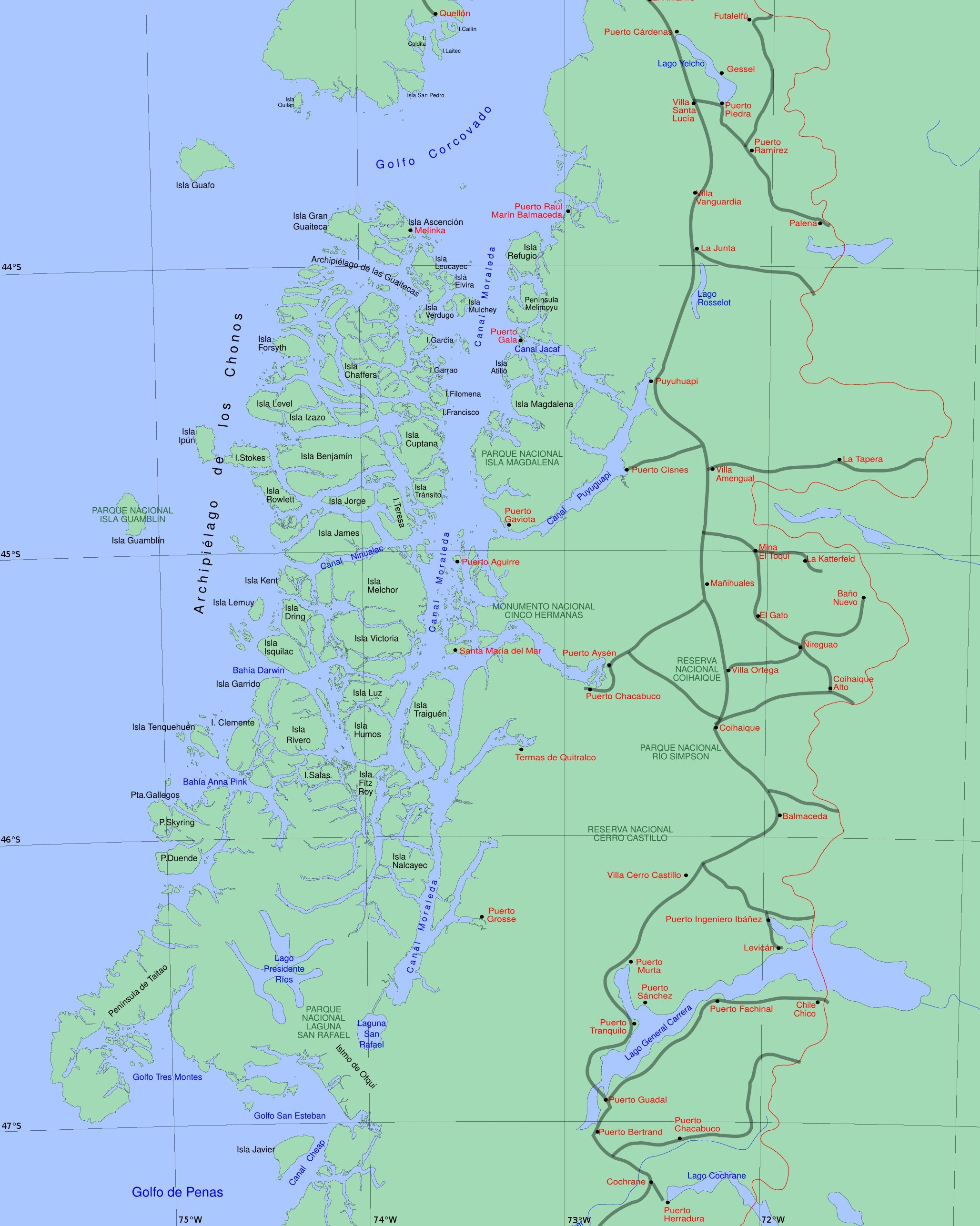
- Location: Southern America
- Coordinates: 44.4147222°S 73.4205556°W
- Basin countries: Chile
- Average depth: −50 m (−160 ft)

Moraleda Channel (Spanish: Canal Moraleda) is a body of water separating the Chonos Archipelago from the mainland of Chile. It is located at 44.4147222°S 73.4205556°W, leading to Gulf of Corcovado. Southward from the mouth of the Aisén Fjord, Moraleda Channel divides into two arms. The east arm, called Canal Costa (Costa Channel), is the main one. Farther south the name changes to Estero Elefantes (Elefantes Estuary), which terminates in the gulf of the same name. The channel runs along the Liquiñe-Ofqui Fault.

The channel is named after José de Moraleda y Montero, a Spanish navy officer who explored the area in the 1780s.

The deepest part of the channel are situated in west of Magdalena Island.

In 1985 the discovery of merluza fishing grounds in Moraleda Channel sparkled a fishing boom (boom merluzero) that led to the spontaneous growth of two new settlements; Puerto Gaviota and Puerto Gala.
