= Malvinas Islands (Chile) =

Group of islands in southern Chile

Native name: Islas Malvinas
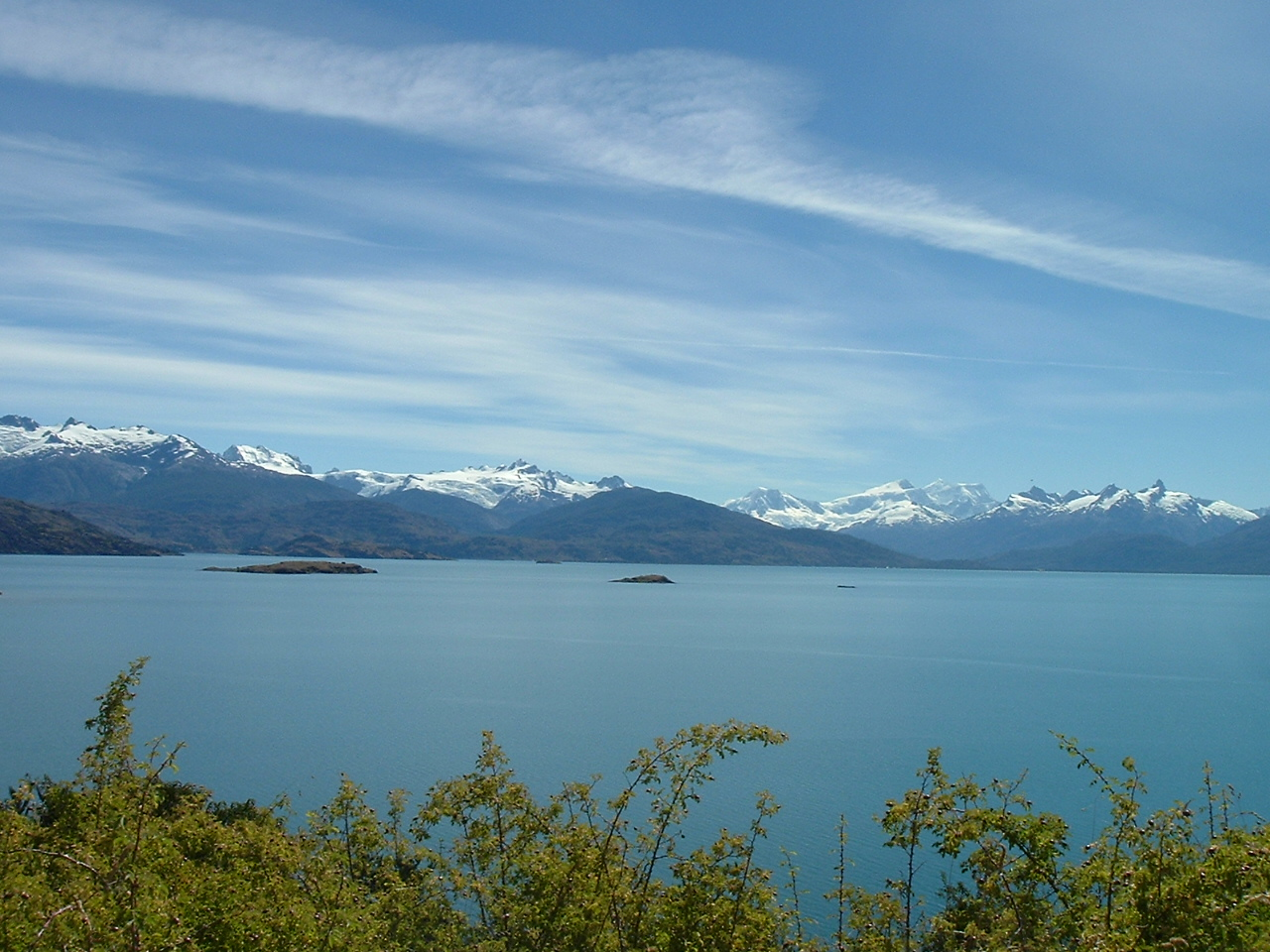
- View over the lake Carrera to the Northern Patagonian Ice Field

- Location within Chile

Geography
- Coordinates: 46.62207°S 72.527198°W
- Adjacent to: General Carrera Lake

Administration
- Chile
- Region: Aisén
- Province: General Carrera
- Commune: Chile Chico

Additional information
- NGA UFI=-891502

The Malvinas Islands are three round islands located south of Puerto Sánchez in the General Carrera Lake, Aisén Region of Chile. The largest is 3,170 square metres (0.78 acres) with around 200 metres (660 ft) of shoreline, and is positioned 55 metres (180 ft) from the mainland.

== See also ==
- Puerto Ingeniero Ibáñez
- List of islands of Chile
