= Puerto Sánchez =

- Village
- Interactive map of Puerto Sánchez
- Coordinates: 46°35′31″S 72°34′41″W
- Country: Chile
- Region: Aysén Region
- Province: General Carrera Province
- Commune: Río Ibáñez

Puerto Sánchez or Puerto Eulogio Sánchez is a small town located on the northern bank of the Carrera Lake, which is administratively dependent on the municipality of Río Ibáñez, General Carrera Province, Aysén Region, in Chile.

== History ==
Puerto Sánchez originated as a mining town. During the 1950s, various lead, zinc, and silver mining operations were established in the area, primarily at the Las Luces mine, operated by the Puerto Sánchez Mining Company.

== Geography ==
Puerto Sánchez is located on the northern shore of General Carrera Lake, opposite the Levicán Peninsula, at an approximate altitude of 210 meters above sea level. The climate is cool and rainy with a Patagonian influence, with annual rainfall exceeding 1000 mm and average temperatures ranging from 2 °C in winter to 15 °C in summer.
