= Puerto Sánchez Airport =

- IATA: none; ICAO: SCSZ

Summary
- Airport type: Public
- Serves: Puerto Sánchez (es), Chile
- Elevation AMSL: 680 ft / 207 m
- Coordinates: 46°35′30″S 72°35′13″W

Map
- Location of Puerto Sánchez Airport in Chile

Runways
Direction	Length		Surface
Direction	m	ft	Surface
12/30	670	2,198	Grass
- Source: Landings.com Google Maps GCM

Puerto Sánchez Airport (ICAO: SCSZ) is an airport serving Puerto Sánchez (es), a village on the north shore of General Carrera Lake in the Aysén Region of Chile. The runway is just west of the village.

There is mountainous terrain northwest through east. Southeasterly approach and departure are over the water.

== See also ==
- Transport in Chile
- List of airports in Chile
