= Puerto Ingeniero Ibáñez Airport =

- IATA: none; ICAO: SCII

Summary
- Airport type: Public
- Serves: Puerto Ingeniero Ibáñez, Chile
- Elevation AMSL: 820 ft / 250 m
- Coordinates: 46°17′35″S 71°57′00″W

Map
- Location of Puerto Ingeniero Ibáñez Airport in Chile

Runways
Direction	Length		Surface
Direction	m	ft	Surface
14/32	632	2,073	Gravel
- Source: Landings.com Google Maps GCM

Puerto Ingeniero Ibáñez Airport (Spanish: Aeropuerto de Puerto Ingeniero Ibáñez), (ICAO: SCII) is an airport serving Puerto Ingeniero Ibáñez, a town in the Aysén Region of Chile. The town is at the head of Ibáñez Bay, a bay off the northern side of General Carrera Lake. The runway lies between the mouth of the Ibáñez River and the town.

There is mountainous terrain north and east of the airport, and rising terrain to the west. South approach and departure are over the water.

== See also ==
- Transport in Chile
- List of airports in Chile
