= Marcelo Santana =

Chilean politician (born 1980)

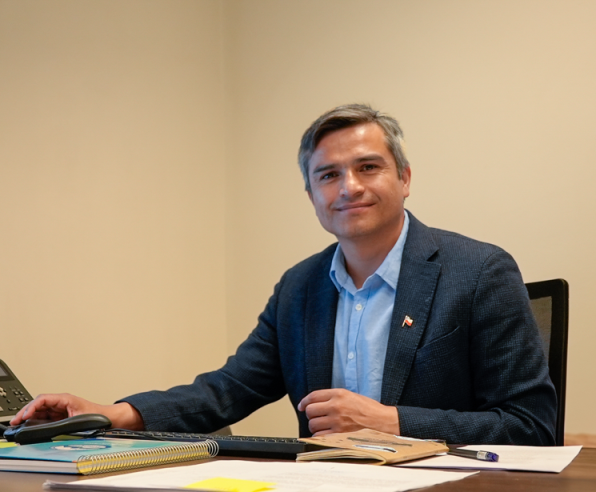
- Official portrait, 2025

Governor of Aysén Region
- Incumbent
- Assumed office 6 January 2025
- Preceded by: Omar Muñoz Sierra (acting)

Mayor of Río Ibáñez
- In office 6 December 2016 – 25 October 2023
- Preceded by: Emilio Alarcón
- Succeeded by: Marcelo Jélvez Cárdenas

Regional councilor of Aysén
- In office 11 March 2014 – August 2016

Personal details
- Born: Marcelo Orlando Santana Vargas; 24 July 1980 (age 46) Coyhaique, Chile
- Party: Independent Democratic Union
- Education: University of La Frontera; Metropolitan University of Technology (Master's degree in Local Development)
- Occupation: Environmental engineer, politician

Marcelo Orlando Santana Vargas (born 24 July 1980) is a Chilean environmental engineer and politician. He has served as Governor of Aysén Region since 6 January 2025.

== Biography ==
Santana completed his higher education at the University of La Frontera, where he earned a degree in environmental engineering.

He later obtained a master's degree in Local Development from the Metropolitan University of Technology between 2015 and 2017. In addition, he holds a postgraduate diploma in Organizational Leadership from the University of Development (2018) and a diploma in Public Management from the University of La Frontera (2014).

== Public and political career ==
Santana began his career in public administration as municipal administrator of the commune of Río Ibáñez, a position he held between November 2008 and May 2010. Subsequently, from March 2010 to March 2014, he served as regional director of the Subsecretariat for Regional Development and Administrative Affairs.

In electoral politics, he made his debut in the 2013 Chilean regional council elections as a candidate for the Independent Democratic Union in General Carrera Province. He was elected regional councilor for the Aysén Region, obtaining 32.68% of the valid votes.

In the 2016 Chilean municipal elections, Santana ran for mayor of Río Ibáñez and was elected with 63.47% of the vote. He was reelected in the 2021 Chilean municipal elections, increasing his support to 69.61%.

On 25 October 2023, he resigned from his position as mayor to pursue a candidacy for governor of the Aysén Region.

In June 2024, he participated in the Chile Vamos primary elections for regional governor, winning the nomination with 52.80% of the vote.

In the 2024 Chilean regional elections, Santana was elected governor of Aysén in the first round, defeating incumbent governor Andrea Macías.

== Electoral history ==
Year	Election	Constituency	Coalition	Party	Votes	%	Result
2013	Regional council	General Carrera Province	Alliance	UDI	1,019	32.68	Elected
2016	Mayor	Río Ibáñez	Chile Vamos	UDI	1,173	63.47	Elected
2021	Mayor	Río Ibáñez	Chile Vamos	UDI	1,088	69.61	Reelected
2024	Primary (Governor)	Aysén Region	Chile Vamos	UDI	4,360	52.80	Nominated
2024	Governor (first round)	Aysén Region	Chile Vamos	UDI	33,883	54.37	Elected
