= General Carrera =

General Carrera may refer to:

- General Carrera Lake, a lake located in Patagonia and shared by Argentina and Chile
- General Carrera Province, one of four provinces of the southern Chilean region of Aisen

== See also ==
- José Miguel Carrera (1785–1821), Chilean general and one of the founders of independent Chile
