= La Junta (disambiguation) =

La Junta may refer to:

Places in the United States:

- La Junta, Colorado, a city in Otero County
  - La Junta (Amtrak station), train station
  - La Junta Municipal Airport
- La Junta Gardens, Colorado, census-designated place in Otero County

Other uses:

- Financial Oversight and Management Board for Puerto Rico, also colloquially known as La Junta.
- La Junta Airport, Aysén Region, Chile
- La Junta Indians, indigenous people of North America living in the present-day areas of Texas and northern Mexico
- La Junta Subdivision, railway line in Kansas and Colorado, United States
- Parque la Junta (La Junta Park), baseball field in Nuevo Laredo, Tamaulipas, Mexico
