= La Junta Airport =

- IATA: none; ICAO: SCLJ

Summary
- Airport type: Public
- Serves: La Junta (es), Chile
- Elevation AMSL: 120 ft (37 m)
- Coordinates: 43°58′35″S 72°24′45″W

Map
- Location of La Junta Airport in Chile

Runways
Direction	Length		Surface
Direction	m	ft	Surface
18/36	898	2,946	Gravel
- Source: Landings.com Google Maps GCM

Helicopter at La Junta Airport

La Junta Airport Spanish: Aeropuerto La Junta, (ICAO: SCLJ) is an airport serving La Junta (es), a small town in the Aysén Region of Chile. La Junta is on the Carretera Austral highway, 50 kilometres (31 mi) inland from the Gulf of Corcovado.

The airport is on the west side of town, 1 kilometre (0.6 mi) south of the Palena River. It is at the conjunction of several mountain valleys, and there is nearby mountainous terrain to the east, and distant mountainous terrain in all quadrants.

== See also ==
- Transport in Chile
- List of airports in Chile
