= Aisén =

Aisén or Aysén may refer to:

== Places ==
- Aysén Region, one of Chile's administrative divisions
- Aisén (name), several places in the region:
  - Aysén Province, a province in the Chilean region
  - Puerto Aysén, the capital city of Aysén Province
  - Aysén, Chile, a commune in Aysén Province

== People ==
- Aisén Etcheverry, chilean lawyer and Science, Technology, Knowledge and Innovation Minister
