= Río Ibáñez, Chile =

Río Ibáñez
- Commune
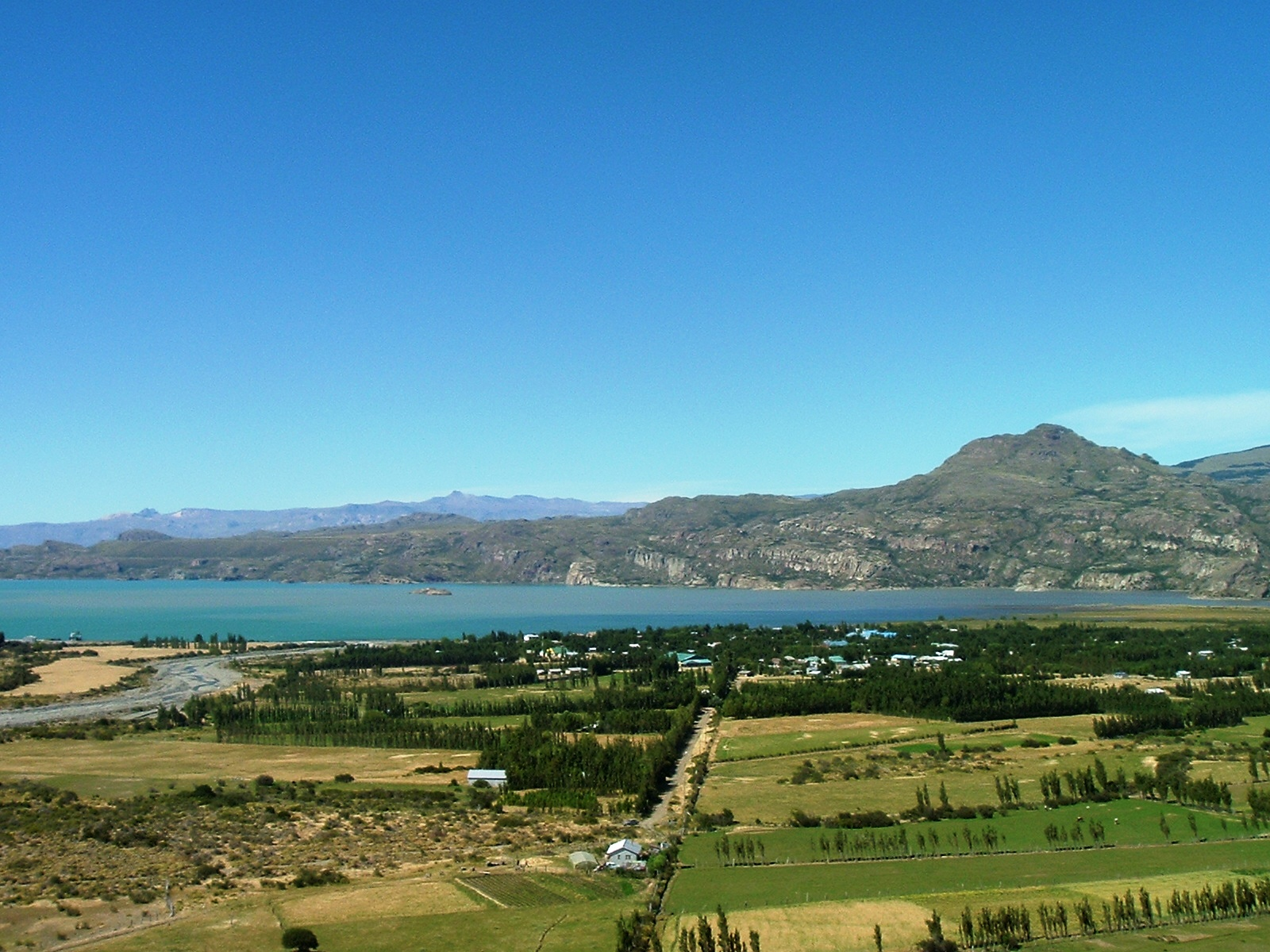
- Puerto Ingeniero Ibáñez at the General Carrera Lake

- Coat of arms Map of the Río Ibáñez commune in Aisén Region Location in Chile
- Coordinates: 46°18′S 71°56′W
- Country: Chile
- Region: Aisén
- Province: General Carrera
- Seat: Puerto Ingeniero Ibáñez

Government
  - Type: Municipality
  - Alcalde: Luis Alarcón Escobar (UDI)

Area
  - Total: 5,997.2 km^{2} (2,315.5 sq mi)
- Elevation: 218 m (715 ft)

Population (2012 Census)
  - Total: 2,208
  - Density: 0.3682/km^{2} (0.9536/sq mi)
  - Urban: 0
  - Rural: 2,477

Sex
  - Men: 1,357
  - Women: 1,120
- Time zone: UTC-4 (CLT)
  - Summer (DST): UTC-3 (CLST)
- Area code: 56 + 67
- Climate: Csb
- Website: Municipality of Río Ibáñez

Río Ibáñez is a commune in General Carrera Province, Aisén Region, Chile. It is named after Ibáñez River, a major tributary of General Carrera Lake.

The commune includes the localities of Puerto Ingeniero Ibáñez, Villa Cerro Castillo, Bahía Murta, Puerto Eulogio Sánchez and Puerto Río Tranquilo.

== Demographics ==
Historical population
Year	Pop.	±% p.a.
1970	3,006	—
1982	3,736	+1.83%
1992	2,772	−2.94%
2002	2,477	−1.12%
2017	2,666	+0.49%
2024	2,723	+0.30%
Source: "Censo de Población y Vivienda". National Statistics Institute.

According to the 2002 census of the National Statistics Institute, Río Ibáñez spans an area of 5,997.2 km^{2} (2,316 sq mi) and has 2,477 inhabitants (1,357 men and 1,120 women), making the commune an entirely rural area. The population fell by 10.6% (295 persons) between the 1992 and 2002 censuses.

== Administration ==
As a commune, Río Ibáñez is a third-level administrative division of Chile administered by a municipal council, headed by an alcalde who is directly elected every four years. The 2008-2012 alcalde is Luis Alarcón Escobar (UDI).

Within the electoral divisions of Chile, Río Ibáñez is represented in the Chamber of Deputies by René Alinco (PDC) and David Sandoval (UDI) as part of the 59th electoral district, which includes the entire Aisén Region. The commune is represented in the Senate by Antonio Horvath Kiss (RN) and Patricio Walker Prieto (PDC) as part of the 18th senatorial constituency (Aisén Region).

== See also ==
- Cerro Castillo National Reserve
- Carretera Austral
