= Aisén (name) =

Name of several places in Chile

Aisén or Aysén is the name of several places in Chile.

The Aysén or Aisén Region is the least populous of Chile's 15 first order administrative divisions. Aysén Province is one of four provinces in the region. Aysén, Chile is also the name of a commune in the province, which in turn is home to the city of Puerto Aisén, the capital of both the commune and the province.

The etymology of the province's name is uncertain, but may come from the Huillice language or possibly the Chono language.

While official documents spell the name Aisén, people in the region often prefer to spell it as Aysén.

== Etymology ==
The name Aisén may come from the Huilliche word "Achen," meaning "to crumble". Another theory suggests that it was a term used by the Chonos culture meaning "going more to the interior," in reference to the Fjord of Aisén that stretches east from the Moraleda strait.

During the 1990s, it was suggested that the name might be derived from an 1831 map made by captain Robert Fitz-Roy, who made an expedition to the coast on board the Beagle with Charles Darwin and labeled the area around modern Aisén province with the words "Ice End". This theory, however, was largely dismissed because the name "Aysen" appears in documents of the explorer Father Garcia, who made an expedition to this region in 1766, more than 60 years prior to the arrival of the Beagle. Despite this, the Fitz-Roy myth has become popular among the many European tourists who visit Patagonia each year.

== Spelling ==
All current official documents use Aisén, as this is the name given by the Military Geographic Institute, the authority sanctioning official Chilean place names. This is legally established in Decree 1,439 The spelling Aysén is preferred by people living in the region and is used by the Municipality of Aisén website. Another argument in favor of Aisén is in the nature of the Spanish orthography, which does not use the letter y as a vowel. For example, the word aymará was changed by the Royal Spanish Academy to aimará.
