= Puerto Ingeniero Ibáñez =

Chilean village

Coordinates: 46°16′S 71°57′W

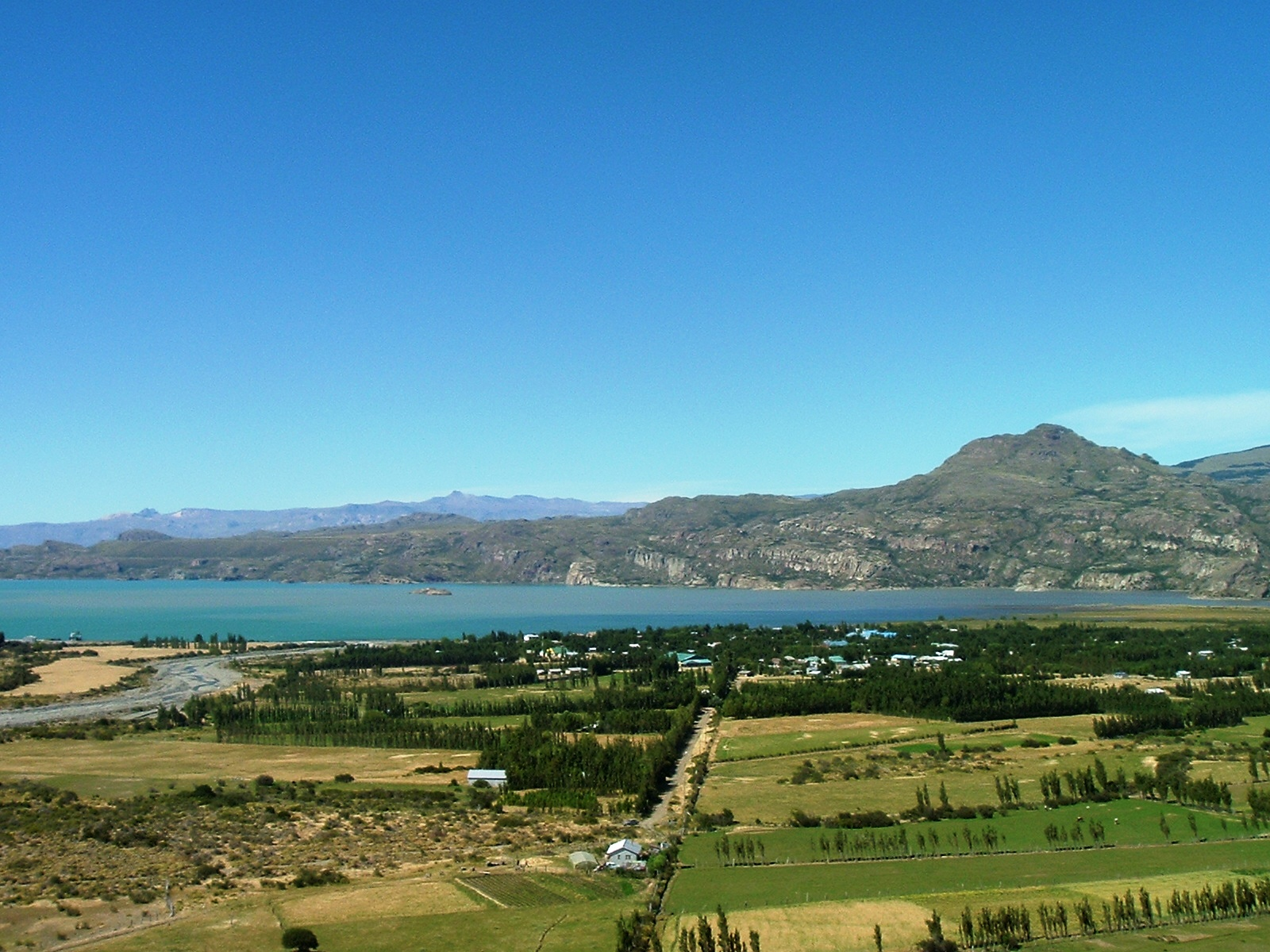
Puerto Ingeniero Ibáñez

Puerto Ibáñez is a small town in the Aisén Region in the south of Chile. It is located on a bay off the north shore of General Carrera Lake, 116 kilometres (72 mi) south of Coihaique. In the 2002 census it had a population of 757. It is the capital of the commune of Río Ibáñez.

== History ==
The town was founded in 1924. It was named after a Chilean miner, Cornelio Ibáñez, who spent several seasons in the area.

== Economy ==
The town's economy is mainly based on cattle farming and crop growing, aided by a benign microclimate influenced by the lake. Distinctive pottery is also made in the town.

Tourism is also important. There is rock art in the area, and the waterfall of the Rio Ibáñez is 6 kilometres (3.7 mi) away.

== Transportation ==
The town is linked to the Carretera Austral by a paved road. There is also a car ferry across the lake to Chile Chico.

The town is served by Puerto Ingeniero Ibáñez Airport.
