= La Junta, Chile =

Town in the Aysen Region of Chile

La Junta
- Town
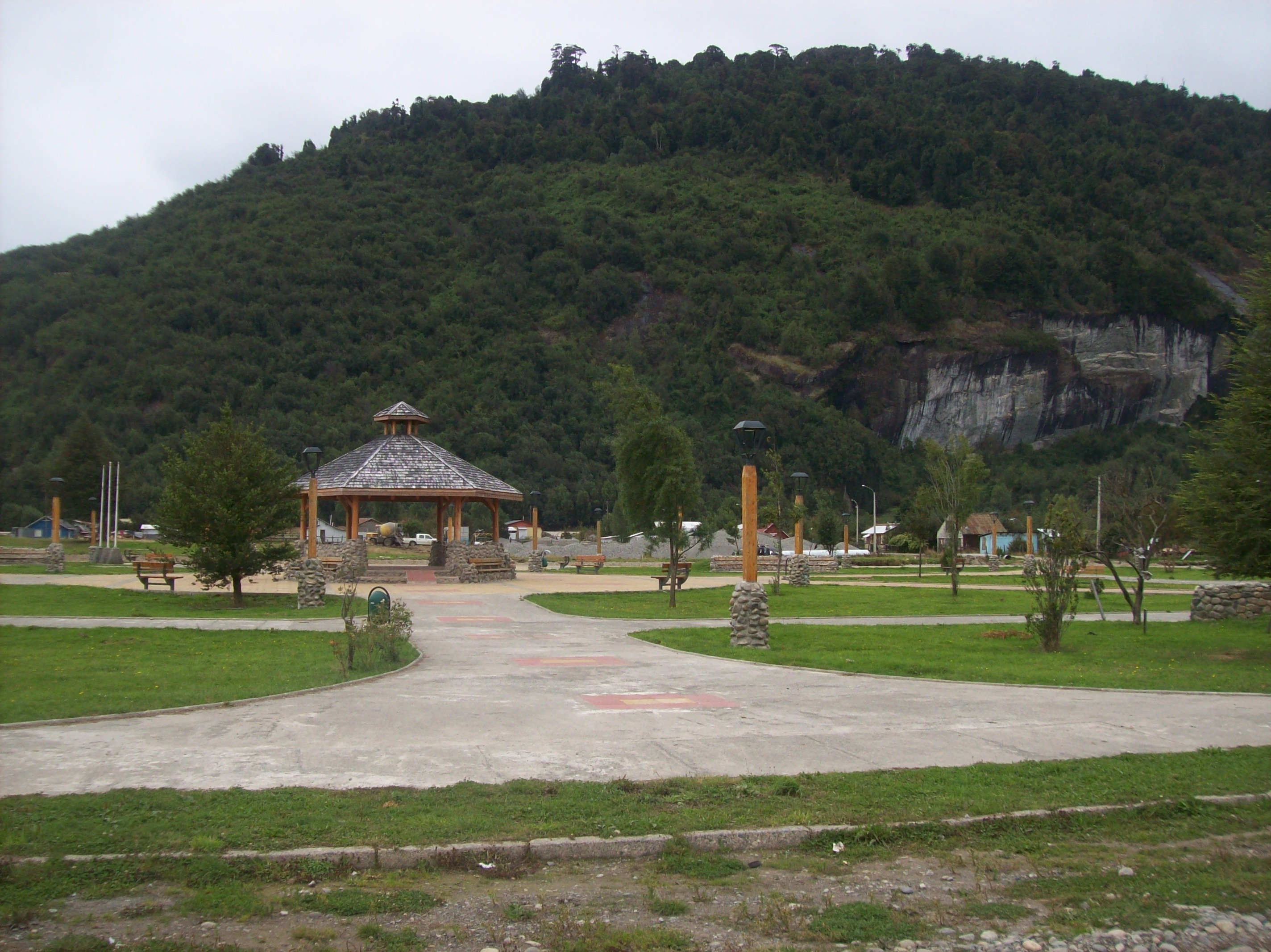
- Interactive map of La Junta
- Example: Country: Chile
- Region: Aisén
- Province: Aisén
- Comuna: Cisnes
- Founded: 1963

Population
  - Total: 1,281

La Junta is a small town located in the Aysen Region of Chile, in the confluence of the Rosselot and Palena rivers. The town was founded in 1963, and saw an increase in population after the inauguration of the Carretera Austral. The town's economy is mainly based in tourism, commerce and animal husbandry.
