= Chile Chico =

- Town and Commune
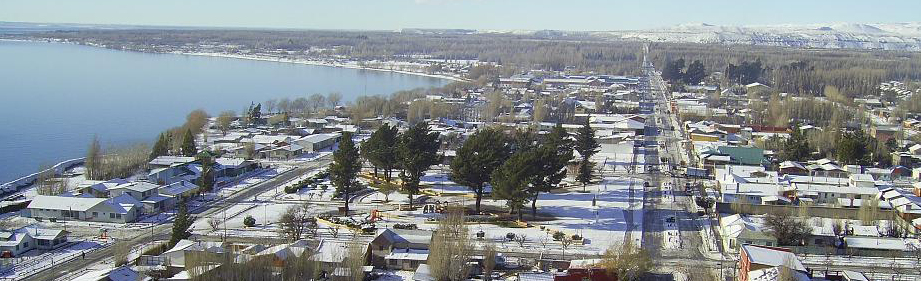

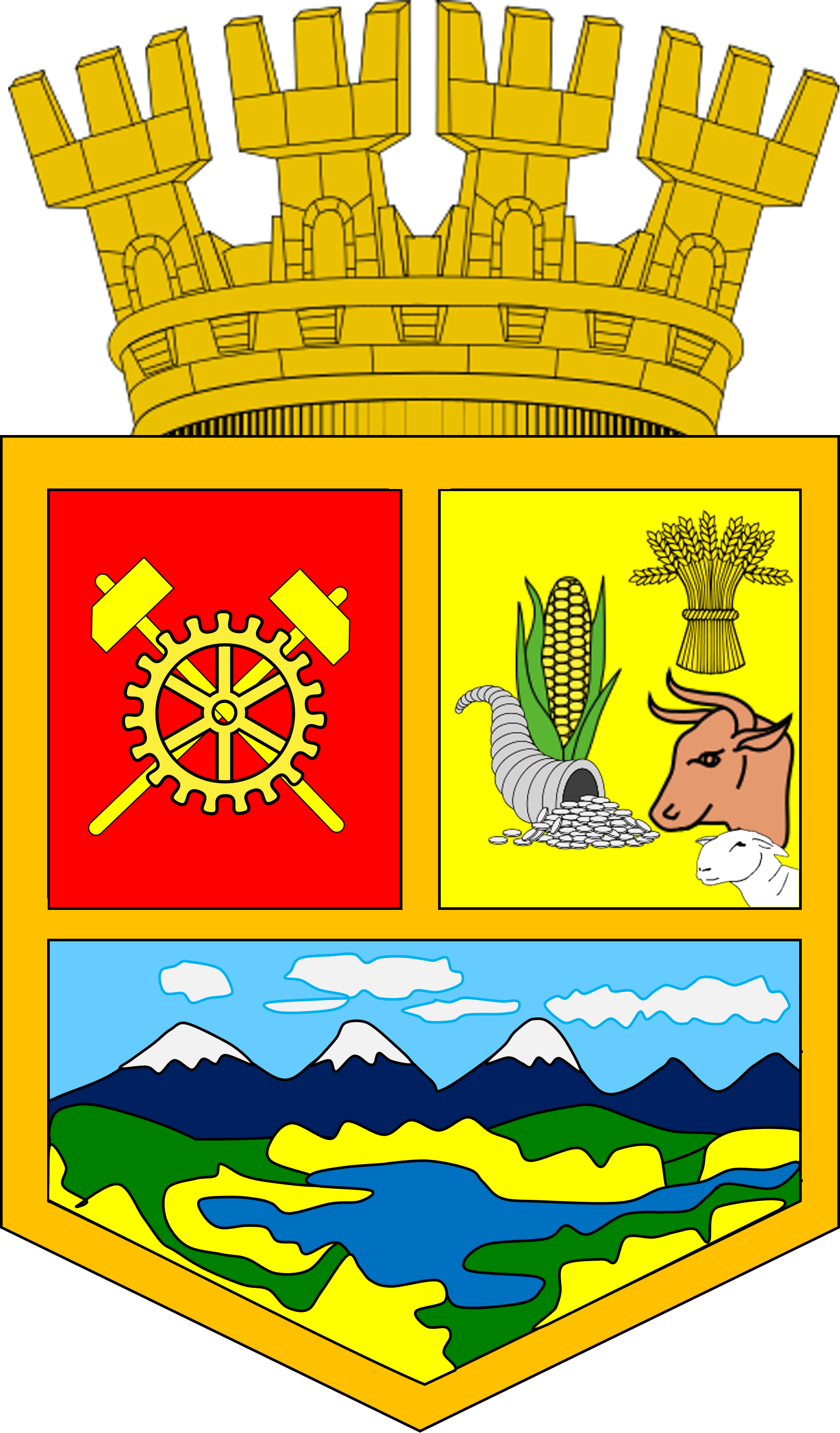
- Coat of arms Map of the Chile Chico commune in Aisén Region Location in Chile Chile Chico (Chile)
- Coordinates (town): 46°32′25″S 71°43′20″W
- Country: Chile
- Region: Aisén
- Province: General Carrera

Government
  - Type: Municipality
  - Alcalde: Luperciano Muñoz González (PPD)

Area
  - Total: 5,922.3 km^{2} (2,286.6 sq mi)
- Elevation: 214 m (702 ft)

Population (2012 Census)
  - Total: 4,627
  - Density: 0.7813/km^{2} (2.024/sq mi)
  - Urban: 3,042
  - Rural: 1,402

Sex
  - Men: 2,378
  - Women: 2,066
- Time zone: UTC-4 (CLT)
  - Summer (DST): UTC-3 (CLST)
- Area code: 56 + 67
- Climate: Csb
- Website: Municipality of Chile Chico

Chile Chico (Spanish for Little Chile) is a town in General Carrera Province, Aisén Region, Patagonia, Chile. It is located on the south shore of General Carrera Lake. Chile Chico, which has around 3,000 inhabitants, is the eponymous capital of the commune and capital of the General Carrera Province of the Aysén Region.

The town is 6 km (4 mi) west of the border with Argentina and 8 km from the Argentine town of Los Antiguos, with which it is connected by a paved road. A car ferry connects the town with Puerto Ingeniero Ibáñez on the north shore of the lake.

Since 2017 Chile Chico has produced the world's southernmost wine. This wine is produced at the experimental vineyard of Undurraga that is part of Instituto de Investigación Agropecuaria.

== Climate ==
Its rain shadow location gives Chile Chico a mediterranean climate (Köppen: Csb), unusually dry for its latitude with only half the rainfall of Balmaceda nearby and less than a tenth that received at many coastal locations in the Aisén region. Its moderate climate is sometimes compared to Middle Chile but is most similar to that of places like Sequim which lie in a similar westerly wind rain shadow. The record high is 36.4 °C (97.5 °F) in January 2013 and the record low was −13.8 °C (7.2 °F) in July 1982.

Climate data for Chile Chico (1970–2000, extremes 1952–present)
Month	Jan	Feb	Mar	Apr	May	Jun	Jul	Aug	Sep	Oct	Nov	Dec	Year
Record high °C (°F)	36.4 (97.5)	34.0 (93.2)	31.6 (88.9)	28.5 (83.3)	23.4 (74.1)	19.4 (66.9)	18.7 (65.7)	19.9 (67.8)	23.4 (74.1)	26.4 (79.5)	30.7 (87.3)	33.2 (91.8)	36.4 (97.5)
Mean daily maximum °C (°F)	21.6 (70.9)	21.7 (71.1)	19.0 (66.2)	14.8 (58.6)	10.3 (50.5)	7.4 (45.3)	7.0 (44.6)	9.2 (48.6)	12.3 (54.1)	15.6 (60.1)	18.5 (65.3)	20.5 (68.9)	14.8 (58.6)
Daily mean °C (°F)	17.9 (64.2)	17.7 (63.9)	15.2 (59.4)	11.4 (52.5)	7.1 (44.8)	4.1 (39.4)	3.9 (39.0)	5.9 (42.6)	9.1 (48.4)	12.4 (54.3)	15.0 (59.0)	17.0 (62.6)	11.3 (52.3)
Mean daily minimum °C (°F)	11.8 (53.2)	10.7 (51.3)	8.5 (47.3)	5.6 (42.1)	2.6 (36.7)	0.2 (32.4)	−0.3 (31.5)	1.0 (33.8)	3.7 (38.7)	6.4 (43.5)	9.2 (48.6)	11.2 (52.2)	5.9 (42.6)
Record low °C (°F)	−1.9 (28.6)	−1.6 (29.1)	−4.8 (23.4)	−6.5 (20.3)	−9.0 (15.8)	−11.4 (11.5)	−13.8 (7.2)	−12.6 (9.3)	−7.4 (18.7)	−6.2 (20.8)	−4.0 (24.8)	−3.2 (26.2)	−13.8 (7.2)
Average precipitation mm (inches)	12.1 (0.48)	9.7 (0.38)	17.6 (0.69)	23.9 (0.94)	45.4 (1.79)	41.2 (1.62)	51.9 (2.04)	36.6 (1.44)	23.2 (0.91)	14.1 (0.56)	9.9 (0.39)	10.1 (0.40)	295.7 (11.64)
Average precipitation days	3	3	4	6	9	9	9	8	5	4	3	3	66
Average relative humidity (%)	45	45	50	56	67	71	69	62	54	47	44	44	55
Source: Dirección Meteorológica de Chile: Climatología

== Demographics ==
Historical population
Year	Pop.	±% p.a.
1970	3,601	—
1982	3,714	+0.26%
1992	3,757	+0.12%
2002	4,444	+1.69%
2017	4,865	+0.61%
2024	4,905	+0.12%
Source: "Censo de Población y Vivienda". National Statistics Institute.

According to the 2002 census of the National Statistics Institute, Chile Chico spans an area of 5,922.3 km^{2} (2,287 sq mi) and has 4,444 inhabitants (2,378 men and 2,066 women). Of these, 3,042 (68.5%) lived in urban areas and 1,402 (31.5%) in rural areas. The population grew by 18.3% (687 persons) between the 1992 and 2002 censuses.

== Administration ==
As a commune, Chile Chico is a third-level administrative division of Chile administered by a municipal council, headed by an alcalde who is directly elected every four years. The 2008-2012 alcalde is Luperciano Muñoz González (PPD).

Within the electoral divisions of Chile, Chile Chico is represented in the Chamber of Deputies by René Alinco (PDC) and David Sandoval (UDI) as part of the 59th electoral district, which includes the entire Aisén Region. The commune is represented in the Senate by Antonio Horvath Kiss (RN) and Patricio Walker Prieto (PDC) as part of the 18th senatorial constituency (Aisén Region).

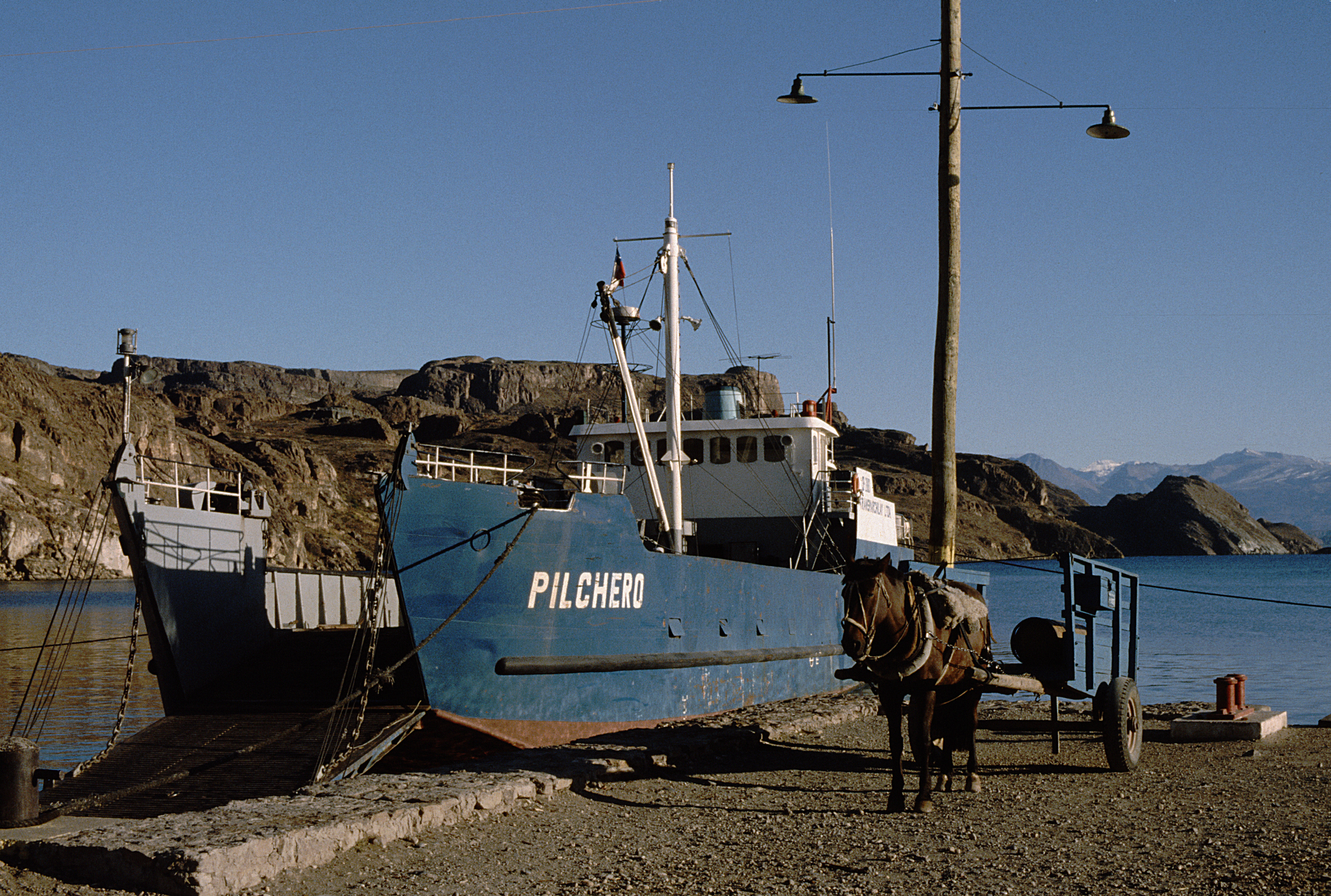
Chile Chico by ship and horse
