= Ibáñez River =

Coordinates: 46°17′46″S 71°57′16″W

Ibañez River Afon Ifan
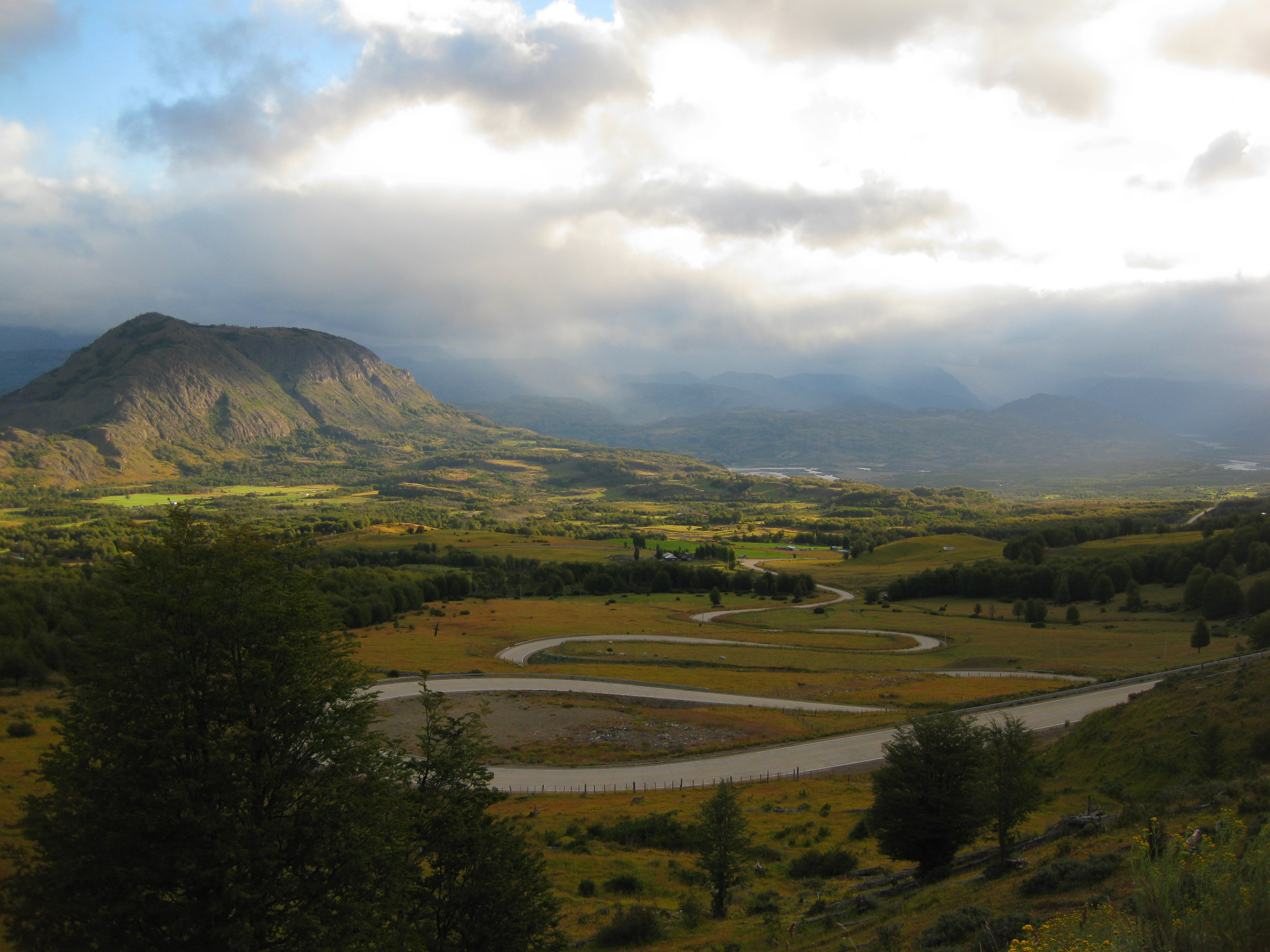
- Ibañez River Valley with a switchbacked section of the Carretera Austral named Cuesta del Diablo

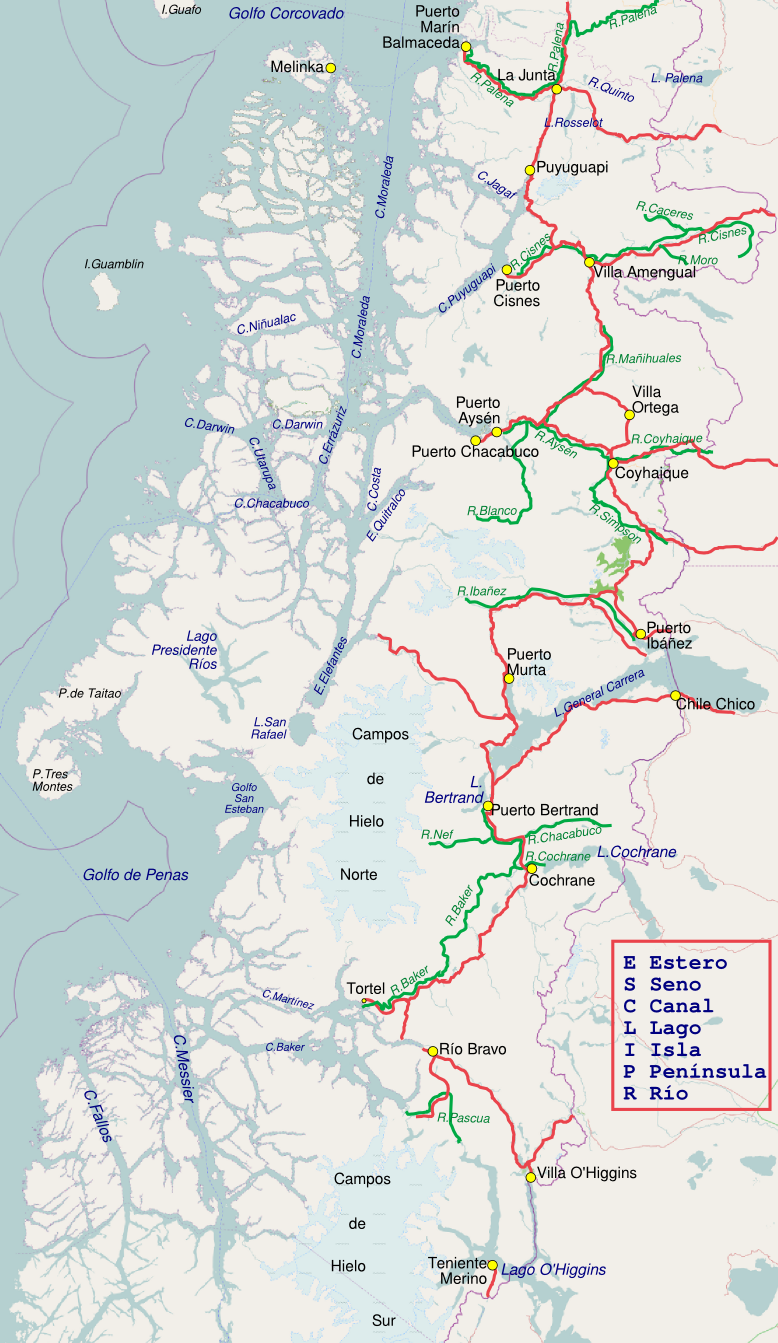
- Ibañez River in the Aysén Region
- Etymology: Named after Evan Roberts

Location
- Country: Chile

Physical characteristics
- Mouth
  - location: General Carrera Lake
  - elevation: 217 m (712 ft)
- Length: 88 km (55 mi)
- Basin size: 2,377 km^{2} (918 sq mi)

The Ibáñez River is a river of Chile located in the Aysén del General Carlos Ibáñez del Campo Region. It has its origin in the skirts of Hudson volcano and flows south-east through the Andes into the General Carrera Lake. The river borders the south side of Cerro Castillo National Reserve, home to Cerro Castillo.

Puerto Ingeniero Ibáñez is located close to the mouth of the river.

== See also ==
- List of rivers of Chile
