= HMS Wager =

Three ships of the Royal Navy have borne the name HMS Wager. Another was planned but later cancelled:

- HMS Wager (1739) was a 24-gun sixth rate purchased in 1739 and wrecked in 1741.
- HMS Wager (1744) was a 24-gun sixth rate launched in 1744 and sold in 1763.
- HMS Wager was to have been a modified W-class destroyer. She was laid down in 1918 but was cancelled later that year.
- HMS Wager (R98) was a W-class destroyer launched in 1943. She was sold to the Yugoslav Navy in 1956 and renamed Pula, and was withdrawn from service in 1971.
