= General Carrera Province =

General Carrera Province Provincia de General Carrera
- Province
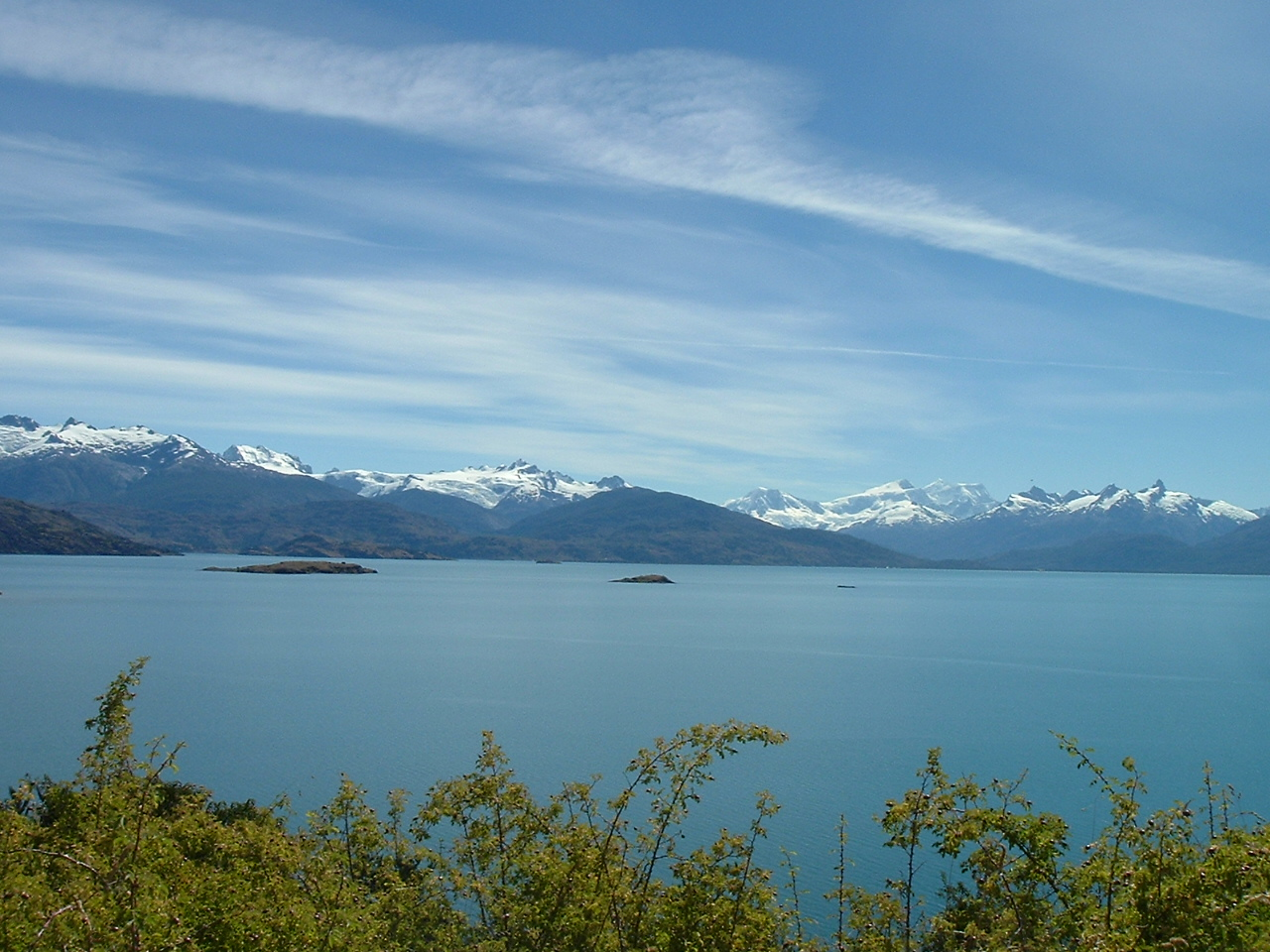
- General Carrera Lake

- Seal

- Location in the Aysén del General Carlos Ibáñez del Campo Region

- Location in Chile
- Coordinates: 46°20′S 72°40′W
- Country: Chile
- Region: Aysén
- Capital: Chile Chico
- Communes: Río Ibáñez; Chile Chico

Government
  - Type: Provincial

Area
  - Total: 11,919.5 km^{2} (4,602.1 sq mi)

Population (2024 Census)
  - Total: 7,628
  - Density: 0.6400/km^{2} (1.657/sq mi)
- Demonym: CLT
- Time zone: UTC−4
  - Summer (DST): UTC-3 (CLST)
- Area code: 56 + 67
- Website: Government of General Carrera

General Carrera Province (Spanish: Provincia de General Carrera) is a province in the Aysén Region of Chile. Its capital is Chile Chico. Covering an area of 11,919.5 km^{2} (4,602.1 sq mi), it had a population of 7,628 inhabitants to the 2024 Chilean census.

== History ==
The Aysén Region was established on July 10, 1974, by Law No. 575, which reorganised Chile into thirteen regions. The region is divided into four provinces–General Carrera, Aysén, Coyhaique and Capitán Prat, which are further divided into ten communes.

== Geography ==
General Carrera Province is one of the four provinces of the Aysén Region in Chile. It is located in the east-central part of the region along the Argentinian border, and covers an area of 11,919.5 km^{2} (4,602.1 sq mi). The majority (96.2%) of the province's land belongs to the Baker River basin. Monte San Valentín (San Valentin peak), at 4,070 m (13,350 ft) is the highest peak in the province.

Chile Chico, the province capital is, located on the shores of General Carrera Lake in the Chilean Patagonia. Chile Chico has a warm Mediterranean climate (Köppen climate classification: Csb) with an average annual temperature of 8.39 °C (47.10 °F). The region receives approximately 3.08 cm (1.21 in) of rainfall annually on average.

== Administration ==
Genera Carrera is a second-level administrative division of Chile, governed by a provincial governor. It is further subdivided into two communes (comunas), Río Ibáñez and Chile Chico.

== Demographics ==
According to the 2024 Chilean census, the province had a population of 7,628 inhabitants. The population consisted of 3,888 males (51.0%) and 3,740 females (49.0%). Appproximately 16.8% of the population was below the age of 15, 66.0% was between the ages of 15 and 64 years, and 17.2% was aged 65 or older. The province had a rural population of 4,546 inhabitants (59.6%) and an urban population of 3,082 inhabitants (40.4%). Most residents were born in Chile, accounting for 7,271 inhabitants (95.3%). Non-indigenous people formed the majority of the population, with 5,470 inhabitants (71.7%), while 2,156 inhabitants (28.3%) identified as belonging to indigenous groups. Roman Catholics formed the largest religious group, 3,521 adherents (55.7%), followed by 1,725 inhabitants (27.3%) indicating no religious affiliation, and Evangelicals or Protestants, with 919 adherents (14.5%).
