= General Carrera Lake =

Lake in Argentina and Chile

- Buenos Aires Lake; Lake Buenos Aires
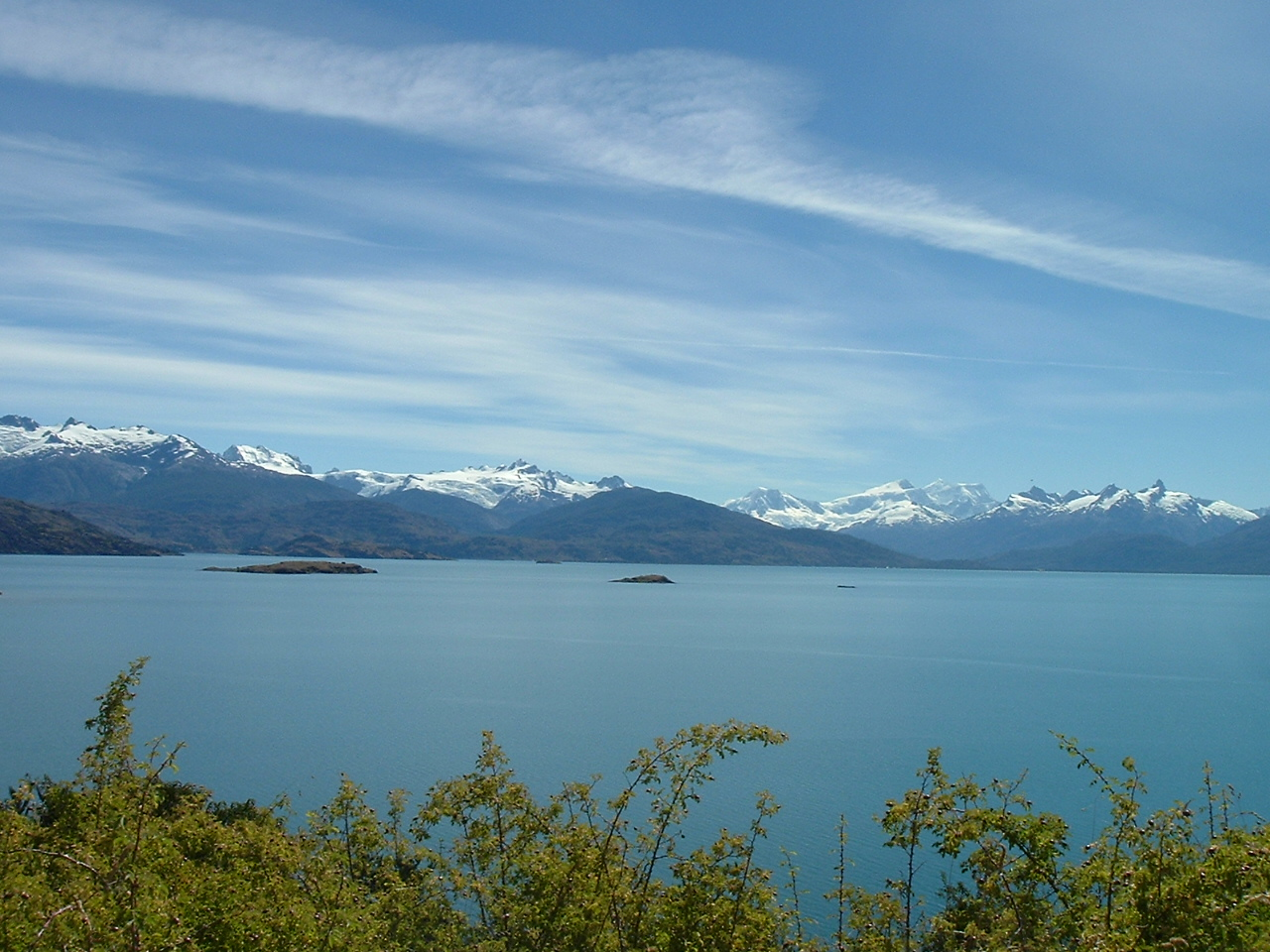

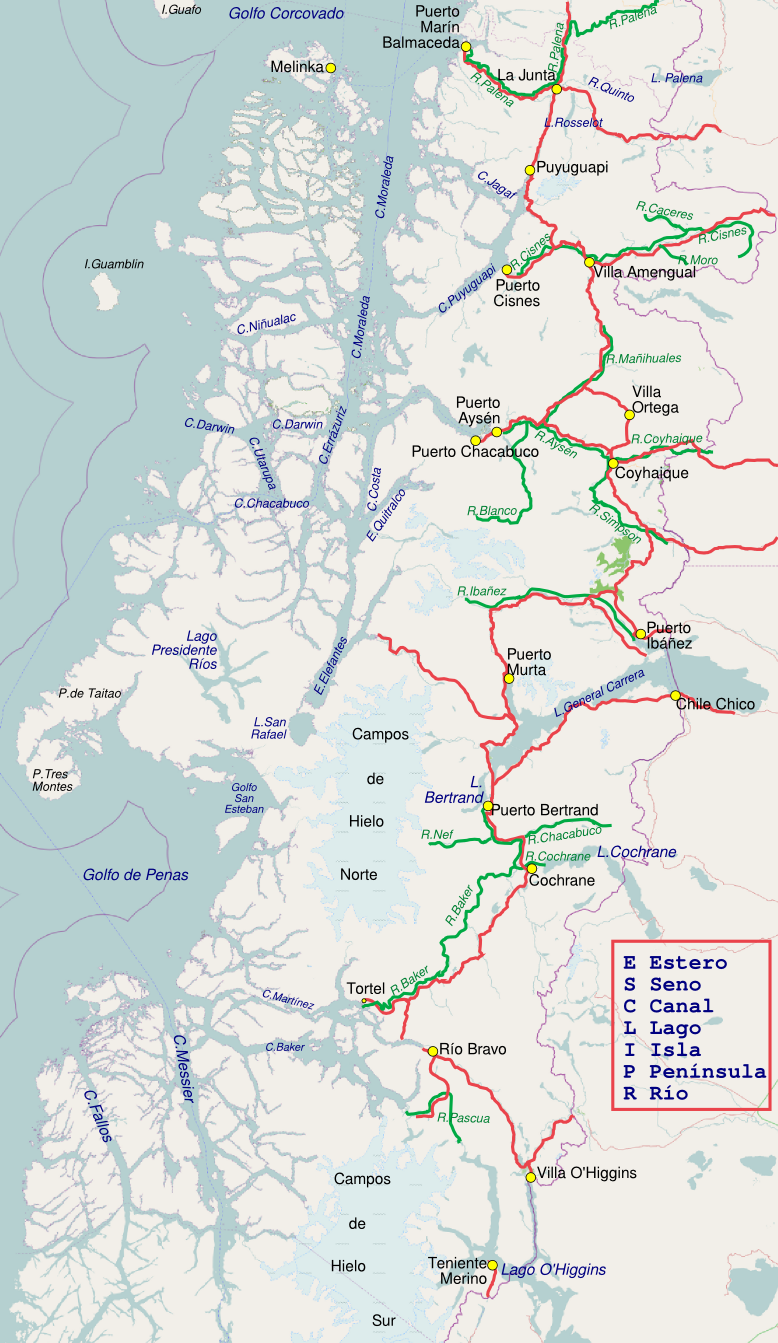
- General Carrera Lake in the Aysén Region

- Location within Chile
- Interactive map of General Carrera Lake
- Location: Lago Buenos Aires Department, Santa Cruz Province, Argentina / General Carrera Province, Aysén del General Carlos Ibáñez del Campo Region, Chile, in Patagonia
- Coordinates: 46°26′15″S 71°42′54″W
- Type: Moraine dammed
- Primary inflows: Soler, Los Antiguos, Delta and Fénix Grande
- Primary outflows: Bertrand Lake and then Baker River (Pacific Ocean) Deseado River (Atlantic Ocean)
- Catchment area: 14,861 km^{2} (5,738 sq mi)
- Basin countries: Argentina, Chile
- Max. length: 130 km (81 mi)
- Max. width: 32 km (20 mi)
- Surface area: 1,850 km^{2} (710 sq mi)
- Average depth: 400 m (1,300 ft)
- Max. depth: 586 m (1,923 ft)
- Water volume: 740 km^{3} (180 cu mi)
- Shore length^{1}: 707 km (439 mi)
- Surface elevation: 203 m (666 ft)
- Frozen: never
- Settlements: Chile Chico, Puerto Ingeniero Ibáñez, Puerto Guadal, Los Antiguos
- ^{1} Shore length is not a well-defined measure.

General Carrera Lake (Chilean part, officially renamed in 1959) or Lake Buenos Aires (Argentine part) is a deep lake located in Patagonia and shared by Argentina and Chile. Both names are internationally accepted, while the autochthonous name of the lake is Chelenko, which means "stormy waters" in Aonikenk. Another historical name is Coluguape from Mapuche, a derivative of this name is applied to Colhué Huapí Lake after Argentine explorer Francisco Moreno reached this lake in 1876 conflating it with Coluguape (General Carrera Lake).

The lake is of glacial origin and is surrounded by the Andes mountain range. The lake drains to the Pacific Ocean on the west through the Baker River. During the last glaciation the lake drained to the Atlantic through Deseado River.

The weather in this area of Chile and Argentina is generally cold and humid. But the lake itself has a sunny microclimate, a weather pattern enjoyed by the few settlements along the lake, such as Puerto Guadal, Fachinal, Mallín Grande, Puerto Murta, Puerto Río Tranquilo, Puerto Sánchez, Puerto Ingeniero Ibáñez and Chile Chico in Chile, and Los Antiguos and Perito Moreno in Argentina.

The area near the coast of the lake was first inhabited by criollos and European immigrants between 1900 and 1925. In 1971 and 1991, eruptions of the Hudson Volcano severely affected the local economy, especially that of sheep farming. A car ferry operates between Puerto Ingeniero Ibáñez and Chile Chico in the Chilean sector of the lake. The lake is known as a trout and salmon fishing destination.

== Area ==
The lake has a surface of 1,850 km^{2} (710 sq mi) of which 970 square kilometres (370 sq mi) are in the Chilean Aysén del General Carlos Ibáñez del Campo Region, and 880 square kilometres (340 sq mi) in the Argentine Santa Cruz Province, making it the biggest lake in Chile, and the fourth largest in Argentina. In its western basin, Lake Gen. Carrera has 586 m (1,923 ft) maximum depth.

== Geology ==
The lake occupies a continental-scale graben formed by SWS-ENE normal faults that have resulted in down-dropping the bottom of the lake to 350 meters (1,150 ft) below mean sea level. Preservation of younger lithostratigraphic units within the graben form reverse stratigraphy with older units exposed at higher topographic elevations to the south. The graben channeled mountain glaciers which formed terminal moraine helping to modify the present-day shape of the lake. The tectonic activity that formed the depression can be inferred to subduction of the triple joint that has occurred over the past 20 million years, as indicated by ripple marks in volcaniclastic sediments observed along the southern shoreline. There is some speculation on whether the tectonics and crustal heat flow in the lake area are influenced by the asthenospheric window that exists beneath the crust in this region of Patagonia.

The Marble Caves, Marble Chapel, and Marble Cathedral are unusual geological formations located on the shoreline midway along the lake's length. They represent a group of caverns, columns, and tunnels formed in monoliths of marble. The Marble Caves have been formed by wave action over the last 6,200 years.

The northwestern shores have valuable mineral deposits of lead and zinc which were exploited intermittently from 1931 to 1996 in Puerto Cristal.

There are various river deltas on the lake's shores and some of them have older parts that are raised showing ivendence of higher lake levels in the past. The three main deltas lie at the outlet of the rivers Maitenes, Aviles and Jeinimeni on the southern shores.

== Gallery ==
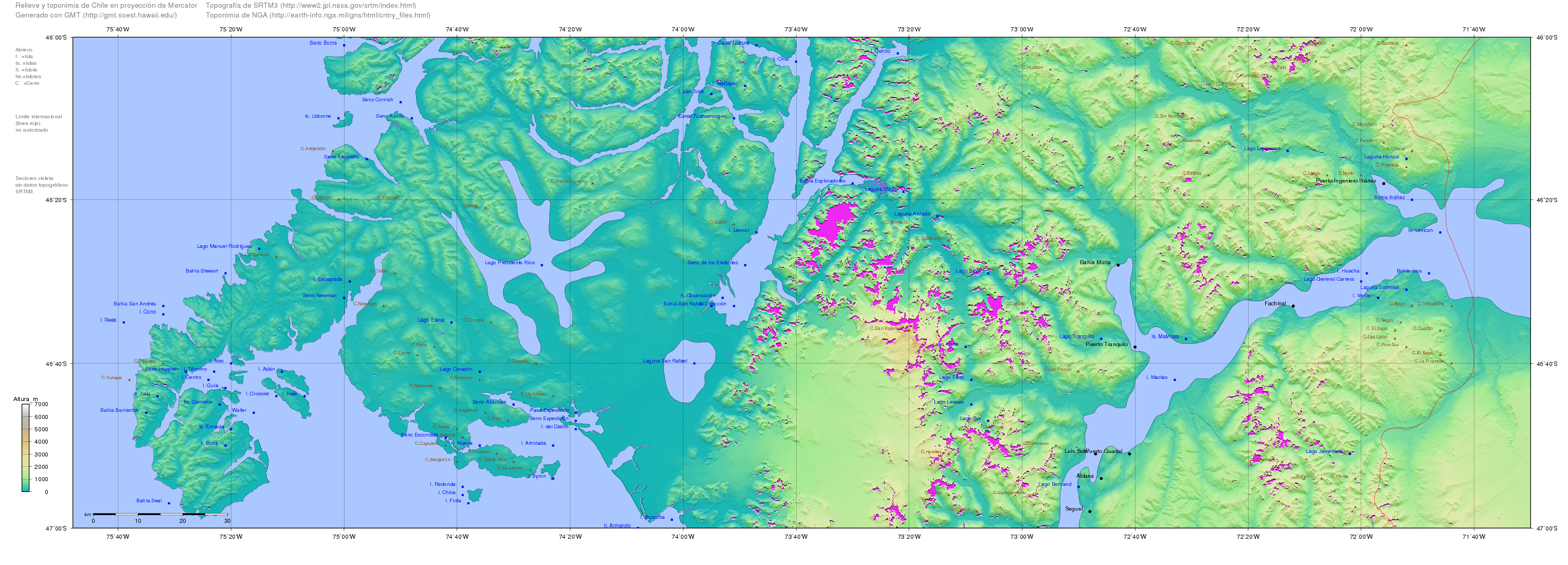
SRTM-Topography of the Chilean zone

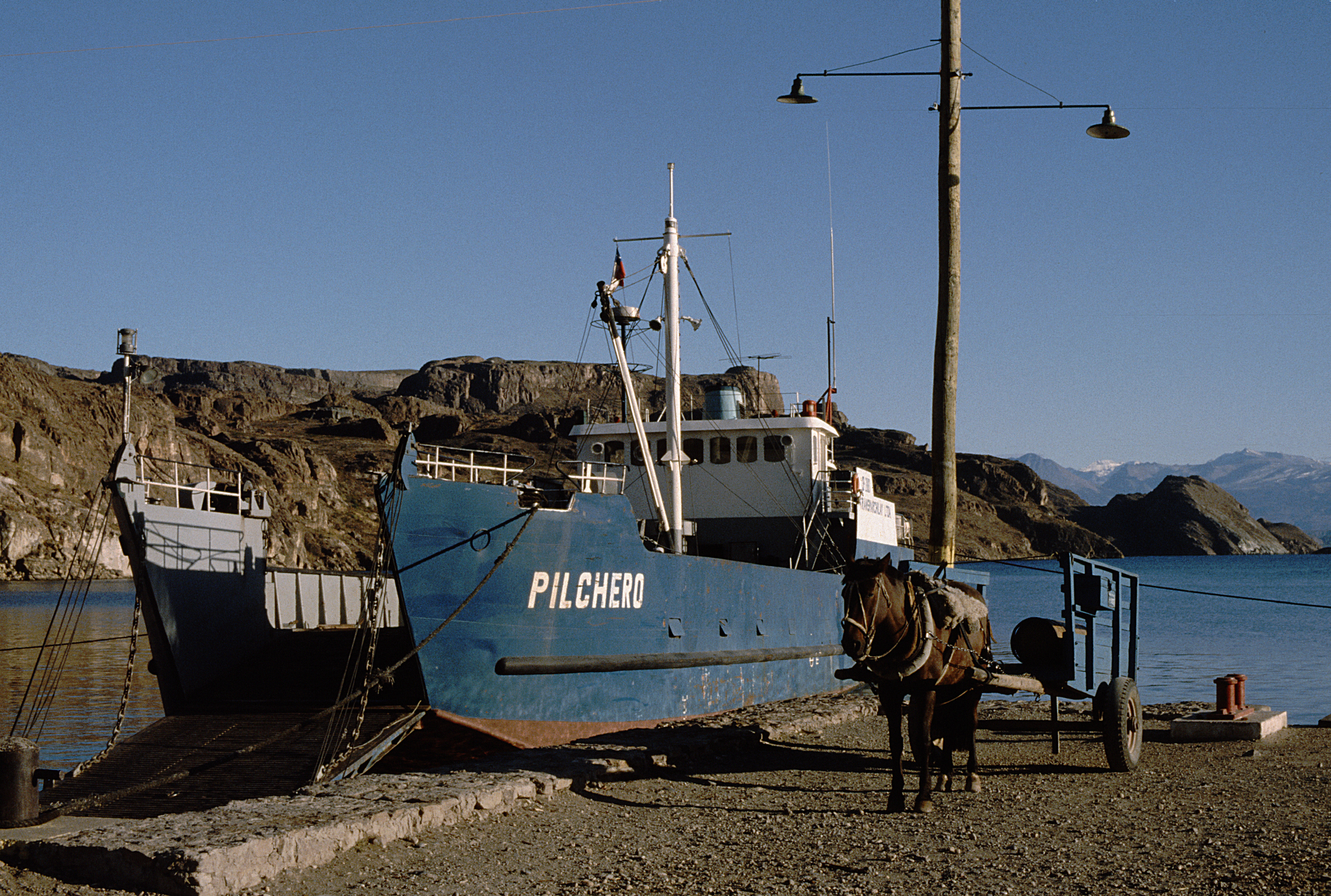
Boat near Chile Chico in Chile

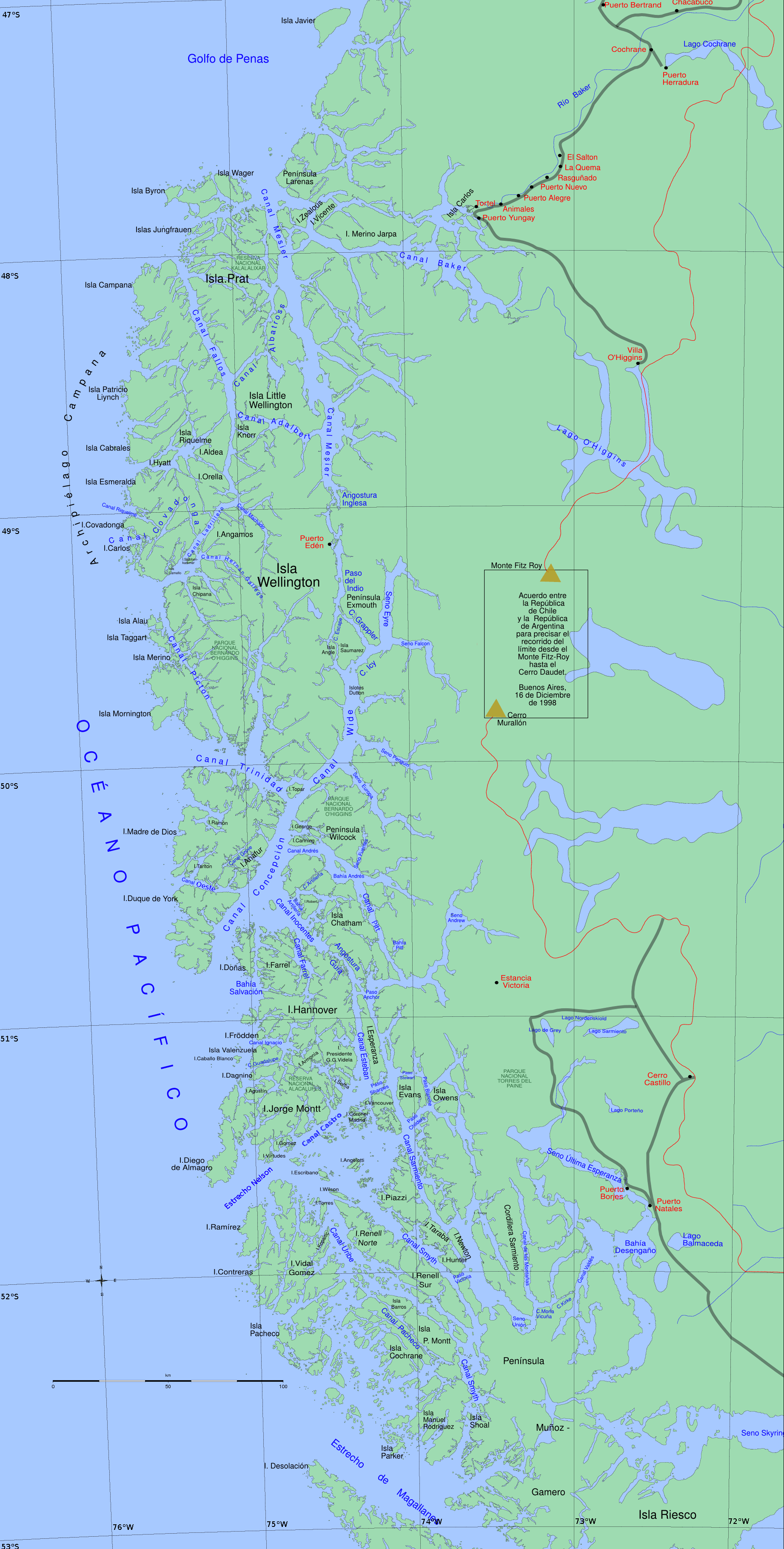
Map of the Chilean zone

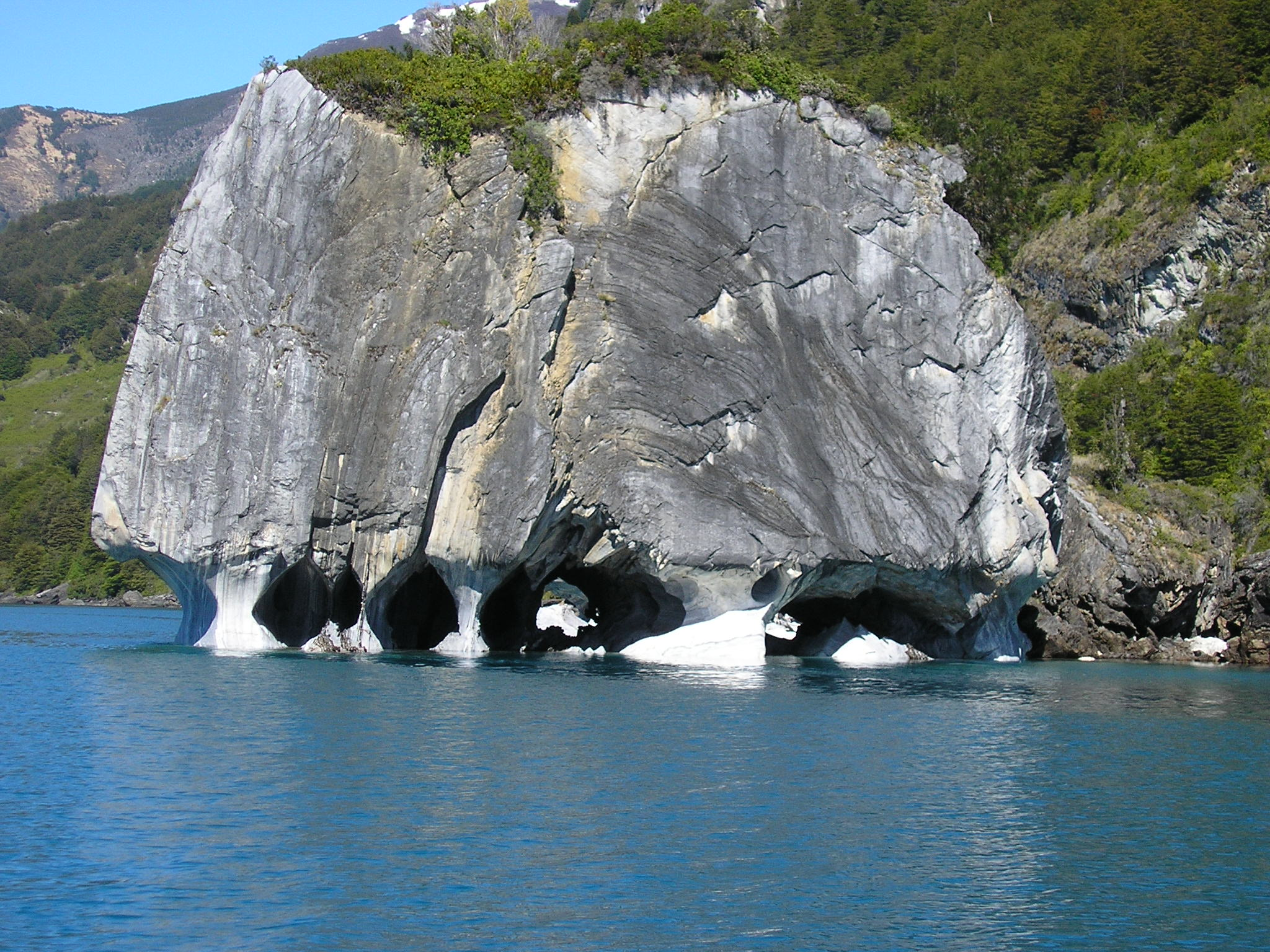
Folded and weathered marble at General Carrera Lake

== See also ==
- Lake Musters
