= Aysén Region =

Region of Chile

Aysén del General Carlos Ibáñez del Campo Region Región Aysén del General Carlos Ibáñez del Campo
- Region of Chile
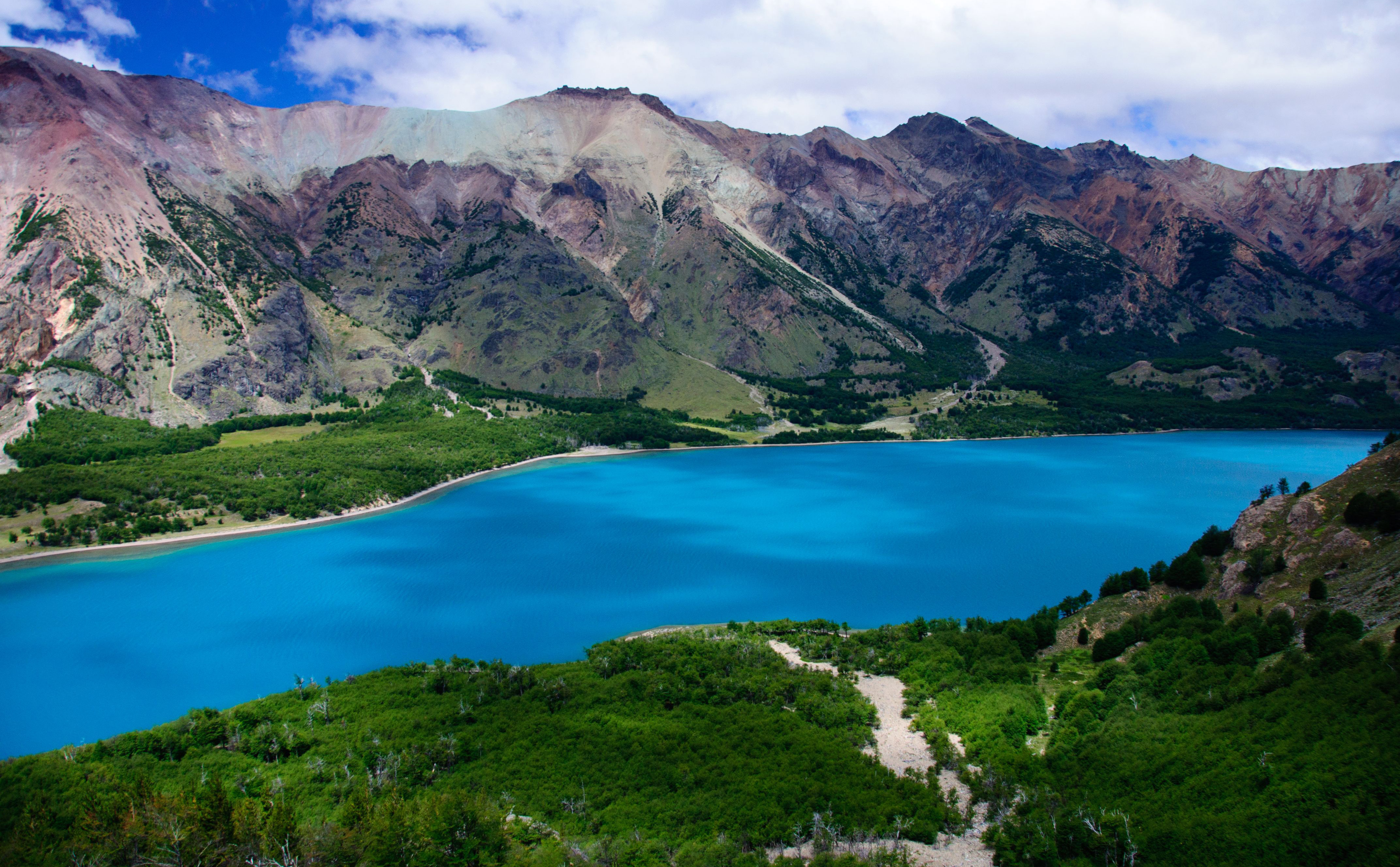
- Patagonia National Park

- Flag Seal Coat of arms

- Map of Región Aysén del General Carlos Ibáñez del Campo
- Coordinates: 43°34′12″S 72°03′58″W
- Country: Chile
- Capital: Coyhaique
- Provinces: List: Coyhaique; Aysén; General Carrera; Capitán Prat

Government
  - Governor: Marcelo Santana (UDI)
  - Presidential delegate: Luz Vicuña (RN)

Area
  - Total: 108,494.4 km^{2} (41,889.9 sq mi)
  - Rank: 3
- Highest elevation: 4,058 m (13,314 ft)
- Lowest elevation: 0 m (0 ft)

Population (2024 census)
  - Total: 100,745
  - Rank: 16
  - Density: 0.928573/km^{2} (2.40499/sq mi)

GDP (PPP)
  - Total: $2.131 billion (2014)
  - Per capita: $19,851 (2014)
- ISO 3166 code: CL-AI
- HDI (2022): 0.816 very high
- Website: Official website (in Spanish)

The Aysén del General Carlos Ibáñez del Campo Region (Spanish: Región de Aysén, pronounced [ajˈsen], or Región de Aysén del General Carlos Ibáñez del Campo), often shortened to Aysén Region or Aisén, is one of Chile's 16 regions. It is the third-largest region in area and the least populous, with a population of 102,317 as of 2017. The capital of the region is Coyhaique, the region's former namesake. The region's current namesake is the former President of Chile, General Carlos Ibáñez del Campo.

The landscape is marked by several glaciations that formed many lakes, channels and fjords. The region contains icefields including the Northern Patagonian Ice Field and the Southern Patagonian Ice Field, the world's third largest after those in Antarctica and Greenland. The northern half of the region feature a north-south string of volcanoes. While the western part of the region is densely vegetated and mountainous, the eastern reaches contain open grasslands and much flat and rolling terrain.

Aysén Region was the last major area to be effectively incorporated into the Republic of Chile, with the first permanent settlements emerging in the second half of the 19th century and the inland part being settled at the turn of the century. Until the construction of Route 7 (the Carretera Austral, or Southern Highway) in the 1980s, the only overland routes from north to south through the region were extremely primitive tracks.

== Etymology ==
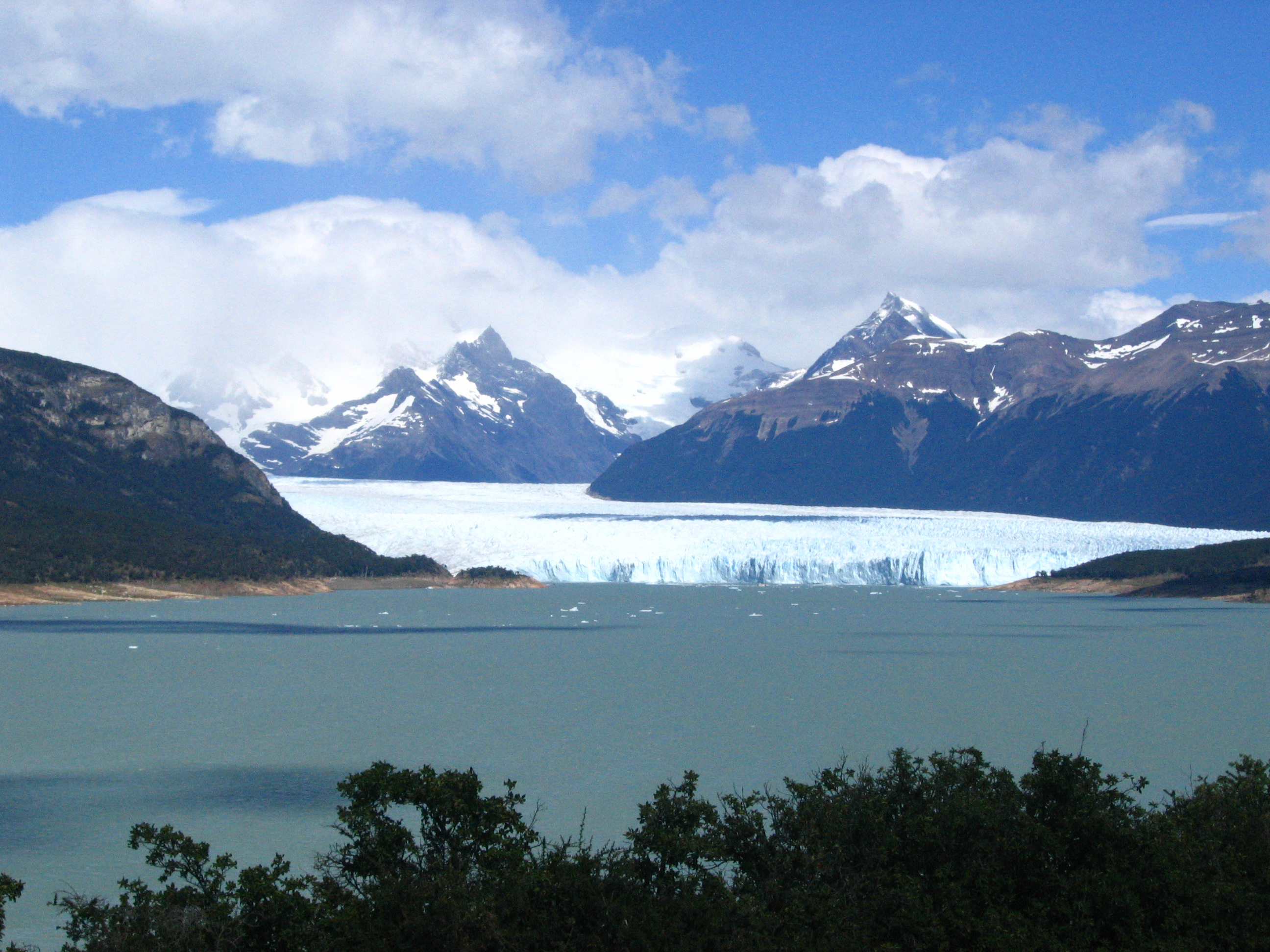
The fjords and glaciers of the region are among the possible origins of the name Aysén/Aisén

There is no certainty about the origin of the name Aysén, which has been used to designate the region since at least the 18th century, although several theories exist. One proposes that it comes from a Huilliche word achén or aichirrn, meaning "twisted" or "crumbled," a typical characteristic of the fjords in the area. Another suggests it derives from a word of Chono origin meaning "that which goes further inland," referring to the Aysén Fjord as seen from the coast of the Moraleda Channel.

Another possible origin, proposed by Kémel Sade, is a compound word from the Gününa Küne or Aonikenk language that could be translated as "rocks where there is water," alluding to the numerous water sources compared to the more eastern territory inhabited by these tribes.

One of the most controversial proposals is that the region takes its name from the English words "ice end". This idea is attributed to the captain of HMS Beagle, Robert FitzRoy, who during his expedition along the region's coast together with Charles Darwin around 1835 may have marked the area on his maps with these words. However, the name Aysen already appears on maps by the Spanish cartographer José de Moraleda, produced in the early 1790s.

During the period of colonization of the territory, the grave pronunciation with a definite article was common: el Aisen.

Although contemporary Spanish orthography prefers the spelling "Aisén" with i, the name of the region is often written with y. In both cases, the words are pronounced with the same semivowel sound for y/i, since the use of y corresponds to an archaic feature of Spanish orthography that is still preserved in the toponymy of some Spanish localities. The use of both spellings is widespread, although "Aysén" is locally preferred.

Both the Military Geographic Institute (IGM), responsible for regulating Chilean toponymy, and the National Statistics Institute used the word Aisén until the beginning of the 21st century; however, in 2010 the IGM decided to use the name Aysén, as well as "Coyhaique" instead of "Coihaique" for the regional capital, which also presents this dual spelling.

Regarding the designation "General Carlos Ibáñez del Campo," Decree Law No. 712 of 1974 gave the region this name due to "the need to pay tribute to the memory of General Carlos Ibáñez del Campo for his outstanding administration and constant struggle to uplift our Nation." (La necesidad de rendir homenaje a la memoria del General Carlos Ibáñez del Campo por su destacada administración y constante lucha por levantar nuestra Nación).

== History ==
=== Pre-Hispanic settlements ===
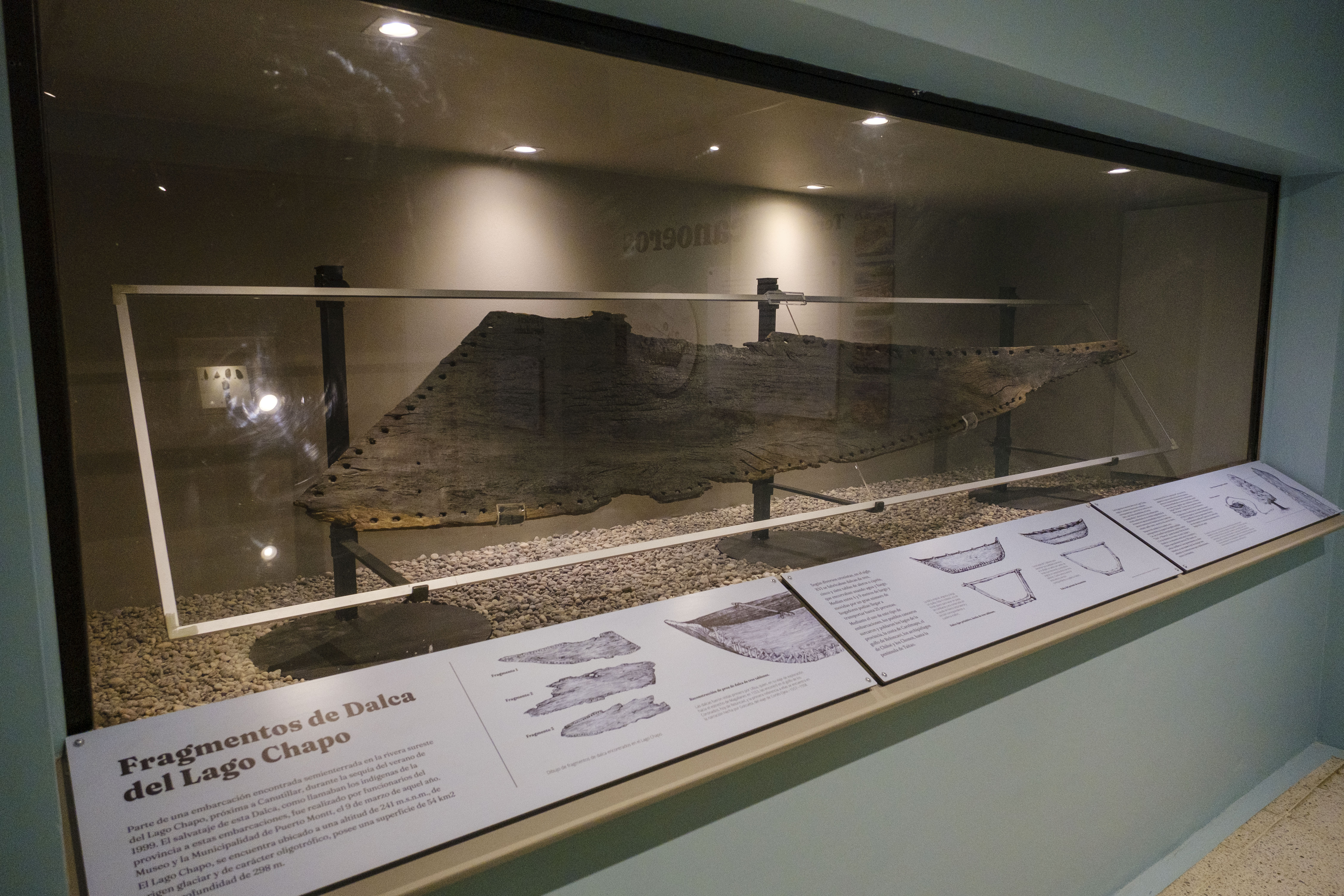
Fragment of a dalca, a type of boat formerly used by the Chono people in the channels of Aysén.

Archaeology in the Aysén Region has so far shown that the earliest settlements came from east of the Andes. Some evidence indicates that approximately 12,600 years ago, hunter-gatherers widely distributed throughout the Americas reached this territory, occupying the continental portion of Patagonia as far south as the Strait of Magellan. An important migration is thought to have occurred about 9,400 years ago, with these people becoming established and altering the existing pattern of development. Later, around 5,000 years ago, new populations entered from Magallanes, while others arrived along the coast, causing a demographic increase that eventually led to the emergence of multiple distinct groups.

During the period of Spanish colonial exploration in the 16th and 17th centuries, various nomadic canoe peoples were reported in the area. They were known by different names, and their relationships with one another are unclear. Among them were the Chono and the Kawésqar, also known as Alacaluf. On the mainland, the nomadic Aónik'enk, also known as Tehuelche or Patagonians, were prominent. Following contact with Europeans, these peoples began to disappear as a result of disease, slave raids, and forced migrations to Chiloé, followed later by disease, alcoholism, and killings carried out by hunters and adventurers.

=== Explorations ===
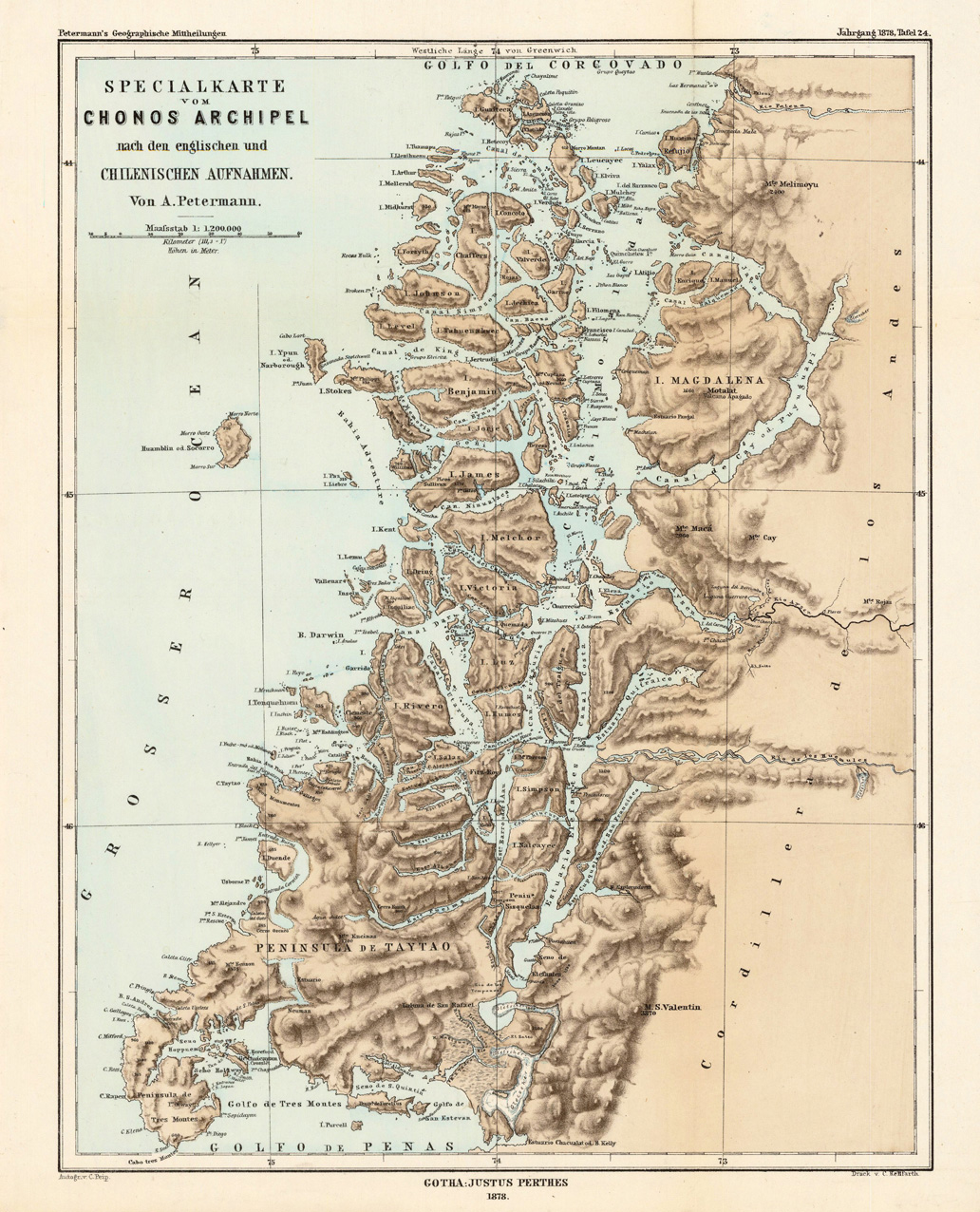
Map of the Chonos Archipelago in 1878 by A. Petermann.

Aysén was one of the last areas of what is now Chile to be explored, colonized, and incorporated into the country. The first person to visit these lands was Hernando de Magellan, who named the lands he saw after crossing the strait the “Province of Trapananda.” He observed a rugged coastline with high mountains, which he called the “Lands of December” (Tierras de Diciembre). Later, Pedro de Valdivia sent an expedition in 1553 under Francisco de Ulloa. Ulloa reached the Taitao Peninsula, becoming the first navigator to set foot in these lands.

During the colonial period, Spanish explorers barely traveled through the channels of Aysén, and those who did were unsuccessfully searching for a route to the mythical City of the Caesars.

The Trapananda region (present-day Aysén) was incorporated into the domains of Chiloé. This geographical area, located between the Chiloé Archipelago and the Strait of Magellan, was considered the final area to be fortified for the Spanish Empire. These domains extended as far as Cape Horn.

Between 1557 and 1679, twelve religious expeditions were undertaken to explore the region.

On old maps, the Patagonian region between the 48th and 50th parallels south appeared to be occupied almost exclusively by a large island called “Campana,” separated from the mainland by the “Channel of the Calén Nation.” This nation was believed to have existed until the 18th century between the 48th and 49th parallels south.

In 1741, the British ship HMS Wager was wrecked in the Guayaneco Archipelago. Following the incident, Spain increased its interest in the region, expanding expeditions to the Ofqui Isthmus and sending Franciscan and Jesuit missionaries, who relocated canoe peoples.

In 1743, Mateo Abraham Evrard led an expedition to Wager Island.

Between 1762 and 1767, and again in 1798, the Jesuit J. Vicuña visited the region. Juan Levien received a land title between the 43rd and 48th parallels south after assisting José de Moraleda.

In 1749, King Ferdinand VI of Spain ordered the construction of Fort San Fernando de Tenquehuén on the Taitao Peninsula. It was later dismantled. Previously, the English admiral George Anson had promoted the establishment of a British settlement on Inche Island.

In 1792, an expedition led by Francisco de Clemente y Miró, together with Luis Lasqueti, traveled to Inche Island in the Chonos Archipelago.

Fishermen and farmers from Chiloé sailed along the Aysén coast, particularly around the Guaitecas Islands. They established temporary settlements to hunt sea lions and sea otters and to extract Guaitecas cypress wood. The first permanent settlement on these islands was the town of Melinka, founded in 1859 and the oldest settlement in the region.

Several scientific expeditions also visited the area. Notable among them was the expedition of Robert FitzRoy aboard HMS Beagle, accompanied by Charles Darwin, between late 1834 and early 1835, when they explored parts of the Chonos Archipelago. In 1857, the Chilean Navy organized an expedition led by Lieutenant Francisco Hudson, who was shipwrecked and died. Five years later, Captain Francisco Vidal Gormaz was sent to navigate the coasts of continental Chiloé and the Guaitecas Islands. In 1870, the Chilean Navy commissioned Enrique Simpson to explore the western coast of Patagonia in search of a passage to the inland valleys. He reached the river that was later named after him.

Apart from these expeditions, the Chilean presence was almost nonexistent, unlike in the Magallanes area farther south, where the government was carrying out a colonization policy. During the border dispute with Argentina over control of Patagonia, little attention was paid to the uninhabited lands of Aysén. Instead, efforts focused on defining territorial claims around the Strait of Magellan and Tierra del Fuego. The Chile–Argentina border through the Aysén area was established by the 1881 Treaty, but numerous disagreements arose over the following years. Chile therefore hired the German geographer Hans Steffen to explore the area and assist with defining the borders. Ultimately, the disputes between Chile and Argentina were submitted to the British Crown, which determined the division of the disputed territory through an arbitration award.

=== Colonization ===
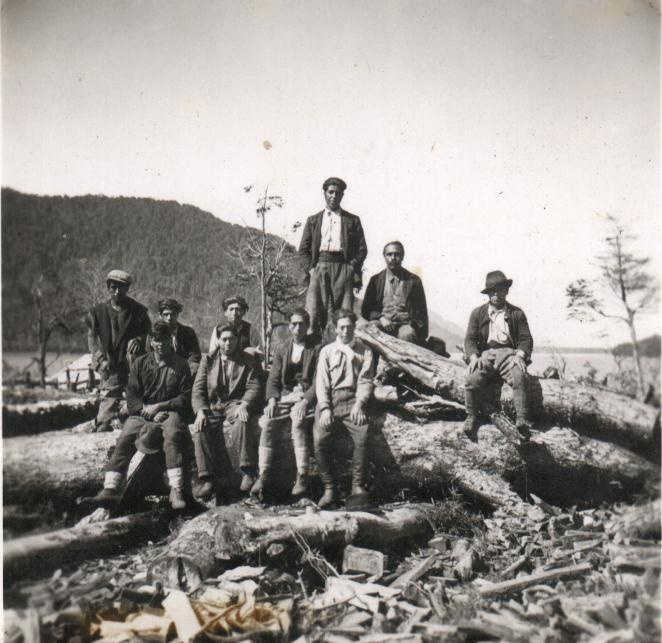
1930s seasonal workers from Chiloe

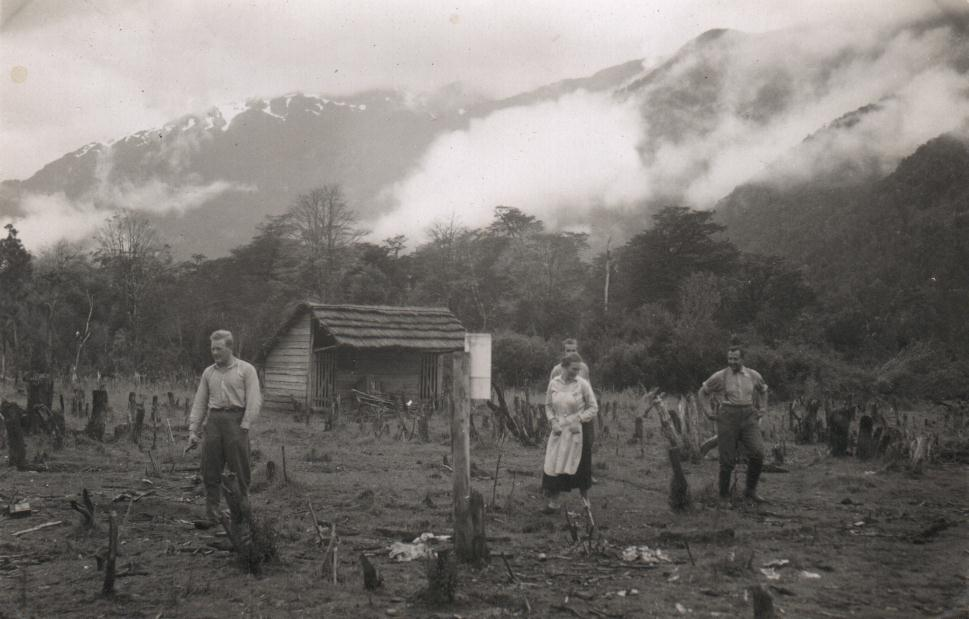
German immigrants in Puyuhuapi clearing the area by burning vegetation.

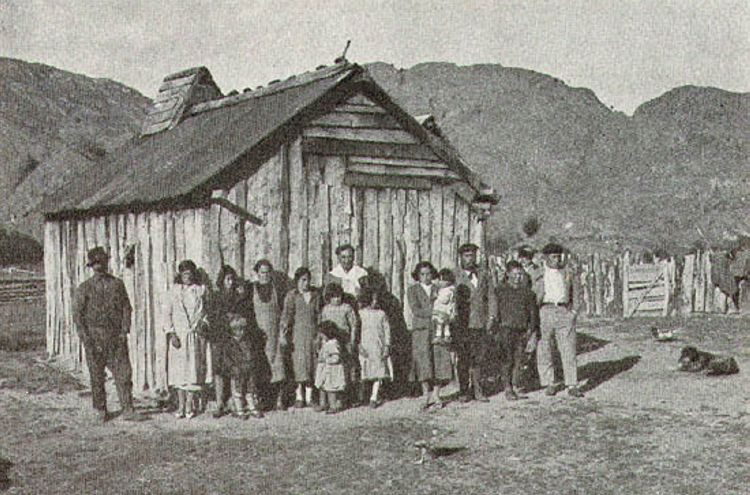
A group of settlers on the Baker River

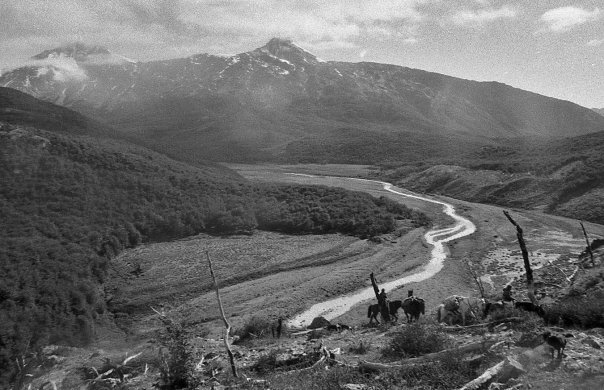
Aysén valleys destroyed by fires, around 1940

The settlement of Aysén was initially carried out mainly by colonists from Chiloé. Around 1880, the first settlement on the mainland was established: a group of houses for workers at a cypress sawmill in Aysén Fjord.

The Chilean state made its first attempt at colonization during the same decade. In 1888, around twenty families from Chiloé reached the mouth of the Palena River and settled on Los Leones Island, at the same location where Puerto Raúl Marín Balmaceda would later be founded. In January 1889, the government of José Manuel Balmaceda therefore created the Palena colony (Lower Palena), which was administered by the Intendancy of Llanquihue.

The Chilean Civil War of 1891, the assumption of the presidency by Jorge Montt, and subsequent negotiations with Argentina to resolve the border problems that had arisen after the 1881 boundary treaty—which were not concluded until 1902—as well as the settlers' isolation and remoteness, led the Chilean state to abandon its colonization efforts in the area during the following years. By 1900, most of the settlers had left, and the colony was practically abandoned.

The publication of the 1902 arbitration award paved the way for the Chilean government to begin exploiting the lands under its control. In 1903, the government of Germán Riesco leased large areas of land to various livestock companies. Among the most important was the Sociedad Industrial de Aysén, which occupied the Aysén, Simpson, and Mañihuales valleys. The Anglo-Chilean Pastoral Co. received a concession of more than 500,000 hectares around the Cisnes River valley, although with less success. Farther south, the Sociedad Explotadora del Baker received concessions covering more than 800,000 hectares, but the difficult terrain and the distance from populated areas led to its failure and the deaths of more than 50 workers during the winter of 1906.

It was not until 1920 that a new lumber settlement, Tortel, was established on the coast. A significant flow of settlers consisted of Chileans coming from Argentina, who settled in several valleys and around Lake Buenos Aires, coming into conflict with the interests of the large ranching companies. The conflict escalated and led to an open confrontation in 1917, known as the Chile Chico War, when the government leased land inhabited by settlers to a Swedish rancher and subsequently attempted to evict them.

The settlers' resistance and its impact on Chilean society led to a reduction in the privileges of the large ranchers, who remained in the eastern parts of the region. The state decided to support small landownership instead. The colonization drive, however, caused significant environmental damage to the region because large areas of native forest were burned to make the land suitable for livestock. This destroyed ecosystems and accelerated soil erosion, damage that can still be seen today.

In 1924, Puerto Aysén was officially founded as the first port serving the region's emerging livestock industry. Five years later, inland, Baquedano (present-day Coyhaique) was founded on the former grounds of the SIA. It was not until the 1930s that colonization of the Aysén coast began to intensify, with the founding of Puyuhuapi in 1935 by German immigrants, Puerto Raúl Marín Balmaceda in 1940, and Puerto Cisnes in 1952. Entering through the region's rivers during the 1940s, settlers began occupying lands farther inland, notably in the settlements of La Junta, Campo Grande, Villa Mañihuales, and along the banks of the Simpson River.

=== Incorporation of the territory ===
Due to the complete absence of any government presence in the area throughout the 19th century, the status of Aysén was never of great importance. According to the 1861 law that created it, the southern boundary of the Province of Llanquihue was the northern boundary of the Territory of Magallanes—that is, the 47th parallel south. However, in 1863, the southern boundary of the Department of Carelmapu, the southernmost department of Llanquihue, was established at Comau Fjord (excluding the Chiloé Archipelago). Later, in 1885, the area between Comau Fjord and the Rayas River (north of where the city of Chaitén would later be founded, opposite Talcán Island) was assigned to the Department of Quinchao, a boundary that was subsequently reaffirmed in 1891 through the Law of Autonomous Commune (Ley de Comuna Autónoma). Nevertheless, the maritime governments of Chiloé and Magallanes were separated at the 47th parallel south, approximately where the Tres Montes Peninsula is located. These differences caused considerable confusion, and it was not until 1894 that the government, by decree, determined that the territory between the 42nd and 47th parallels south that had not been assigned by previous provisions to the Province of Chiloé was part of the Department of Llanquihue.

On June 7, 1915, the 7th Subdelegation of the Department of Llanquihue, called “Valle Simpson,” was created. It covered the lands between the Rayas River and the 47th parallel south and constituted the first formal administrative organization over part of Aysén. The 1920 census counted a total of 514 people in the areas under the SIA (228 in Puerto Aysén and 158 in Coyhaique) and 1,146 independent settlers. During this period, some public services began to be established, such as post offices in Aysén, Baquedano, and Valle Simpson, where there was also a school. Despite this, almost the entire economy and development of the region depended on the exchange of goods with neighboring and easily accessible Argentine settlements on the other side of the border.

As the region's population grew and a general reform of the administrative system was undertaken, the Territory of Aysén was created on December 30, 1927, with Puerto Aysén as its capital; two years later, it was elevated to the status of a province. However, the new division included only the mainland, leaving the Guaitecas and Chonos archipelagos in the Department of Castro, part of the Province of Chiloé. The territory itself was divided into four communes-subdelegations: Yelcho, Aysén, Lago Buenos Aires, and Baker. Under the new organization, various public offices, such as courts, notaries, and police stations, were established during the 1930s. It was not until 1936 that the inhabitants of Aysén were included in the electoral registers.

In 1930, the population reached 8,700, concentrated mainly in the Commune of Aysén (6,835). Puerto Aysén, the only actual urban center, reached 2,051 inhabitants. The demographic transformation that the region began to experience, as entire families settled there rather than merely isolated workers, was reflected in the increase in the female population, which accounted for 45% of the total in 1930—an important increase compared with the average of 20% recorded ten years earlier. Puerto Aysén began to develop, particularly thanks to improvements in maritime transportation to Puerto Montt, which made it no longer dependent on border trade. By contrast, the settlement of Balmaceda, near the Argentine border, began a period of decline as trade shifted toward the Pacific through the port and access was prohibited within 5 km of the border, an area where the community was located. Many inhabitants began moving to Baquedano, renamed Coyhaique in 1938, and made a commune in 1947.

=== Organization and regionalization ===
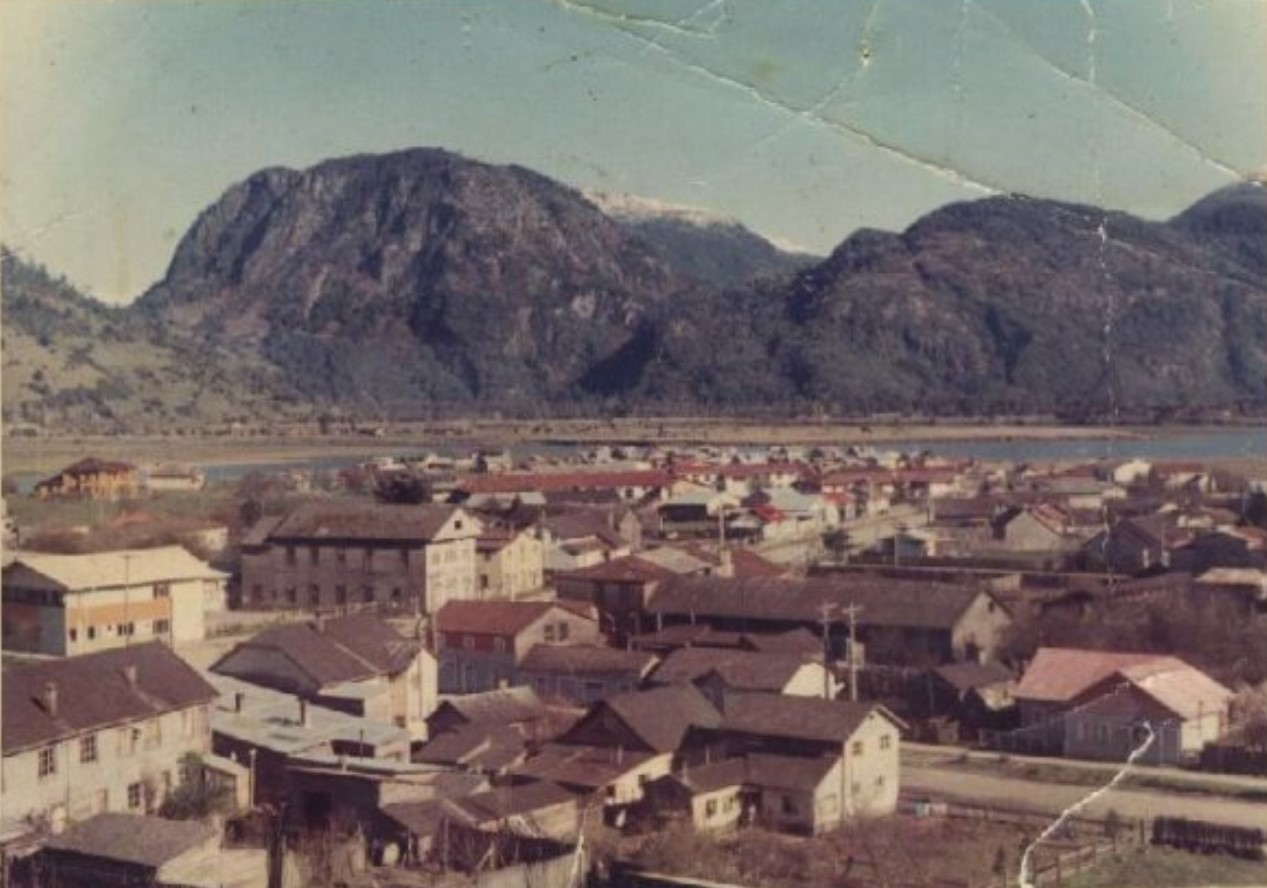
View of Puerto Aysén in the 1950s from Mirador Hill.

Successive administrative reforms transferred the northern sector of Aysén to the Province of Chiloé. Thus, the Yelcho territory was transferred to the Department of Quinchao in 1936, and later to the newly created Department of Palena in 1959. That same year, the former Province of Aysén was reorganized, creating the Departments of Aysén, Coyhaique, and Chile Chico, and renaming Lake Buenos Aires as General Carrera Lake.

Meanwhile, the lack of knowledge about the area during the process of defining the borders generated a new dispute with Argentina during the 1960s. The lands around Laguna del Desierto, which had been unknown at the time of the arbitration, were claimed by Argentina during this period. In 1965, a confrontation between Chilean Carabineros and Argentine gendarmes ended with the death of Lieutenant Hernán Merino, further straining relations between the two countries. An arbitral award initiated following the 1984 treaty between the two countries ultimately awarded the territory to Argentina in 1994.

The dispute over Laguna del Desierto led the Chilean government to attempt to strengthen its sovereignty over the territory of Aysén. Villa O'Higgins was founded on the shores of the lake of the same name, and various proposals were put forward to improve transportation within the region. In 1969, President Eduardo Frei Montalva inaugurated Balmaceda Airport in order to improve the operation of the nascent flights to and from Aysén. It was not until the military dictatorship that, in 1976, the Military Labor Corps began work on connecting Aysén with the rest of the country through the Carretera Austral (Southern Highway), which has continued to open in sections to this day.

As part of the regionalization process carried out throughout the country, the former Province of Aisén was converted into the “XI Region,” with Coyhaique as its capital, following the publication of Decree Law 575 on July 13, 1974. A few months later, the region was given the name “Aysen del General Carlos Ibáñez del Campo” [sic], and in 1975 the Guaitecas Islands and part of the Palena River basin, which until then had belonged to the Los Lagos Region, were incorporated into it.

=== 21st century ===
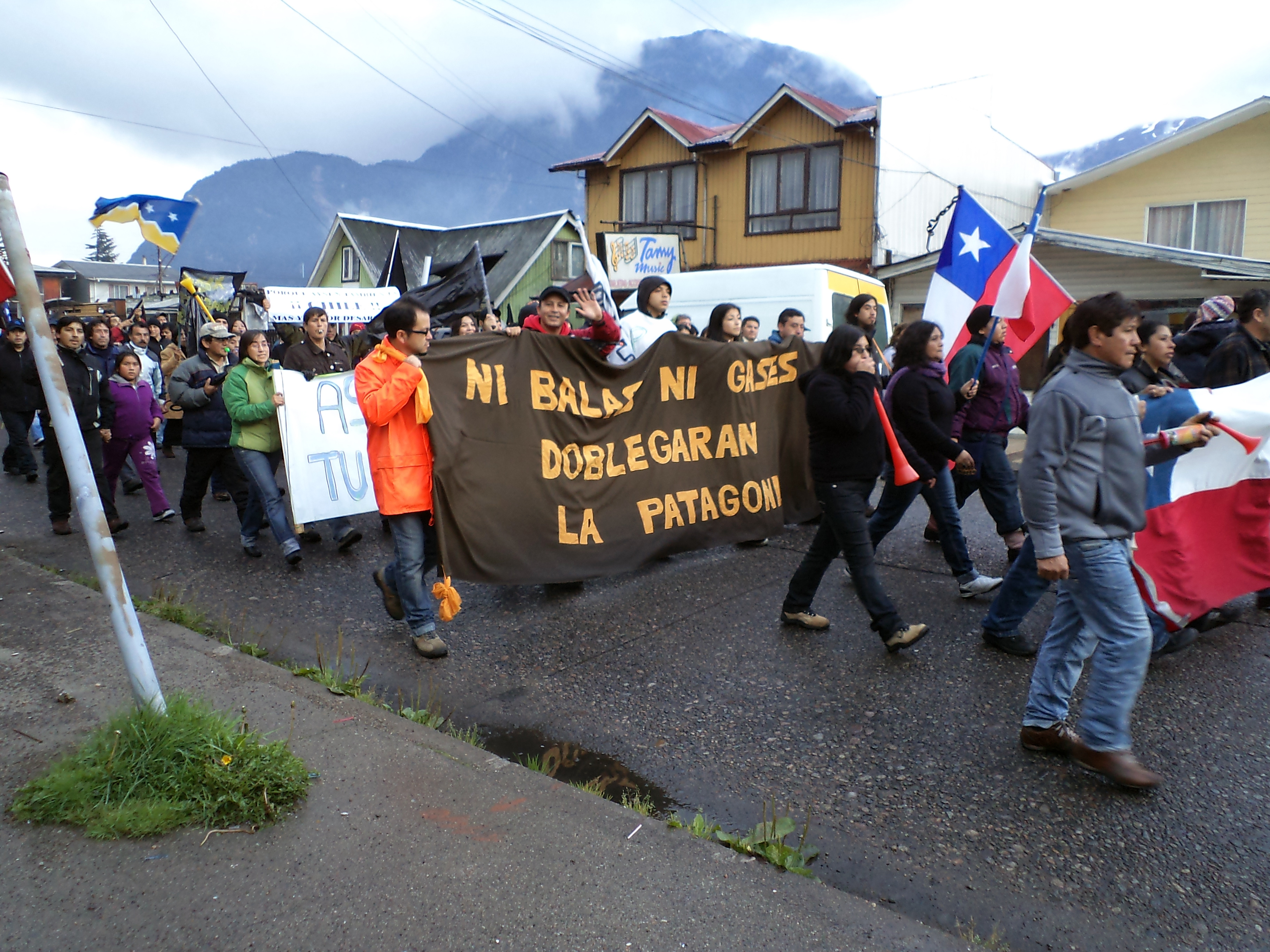
A march in Puerto Aysén during the 2012 protests calling for improved living conditions in the region.

Toward the end of the 20th century, the population of the Aysén Region grew substantially, increasing from 66,361 in 1982 to 91,492 in 2012, although it remained the least populated region in the country. Meanwhile, the regional economy began to develop tourism as an important source of income.

After a series of minor earthquakes, on April 21, 2007, a magnitude 6.2 earthquake struck Aysén Fjord. Although the earthquake caused only minor damage to infrastructure, a landslide triggered a tsunami that swept away homes along the fjord and caused the deaths of 10 people.

In February 2012, a series of protests began in the region demanding that the government of Sebastián Piñera improve living conditions in the area, which had been significantly affected by the high costs of basic services, food, and fuel, as well as inadequate medical services and unemployment. The protests also emphasized Chile's high levels of centralization, the isolation experienced by the region, and the limited attention it received from Santiago.

== Demography ==
Region XI, Aysen del General Carlos Ibanez del Campo, is the least populated of the country. According to the 2024 census there were only 100,745 inhabitants in an area of 106,990.9 km². The population density is 0.92 inhabitants per km². Between 2000 and 2005, the average annual growth rate was estimated at 1.35 per 100 inhabitants.

The largest cities according to the 2024 census are Coyhaique (population 57,823), Puerto Aysen (23,170), Puerto Cisnes (5,137), Chile Chico (4,905), Cochrane (3,458), Río Ibáñez (2,723) and Guaitecas (1,598).

== Climate ==
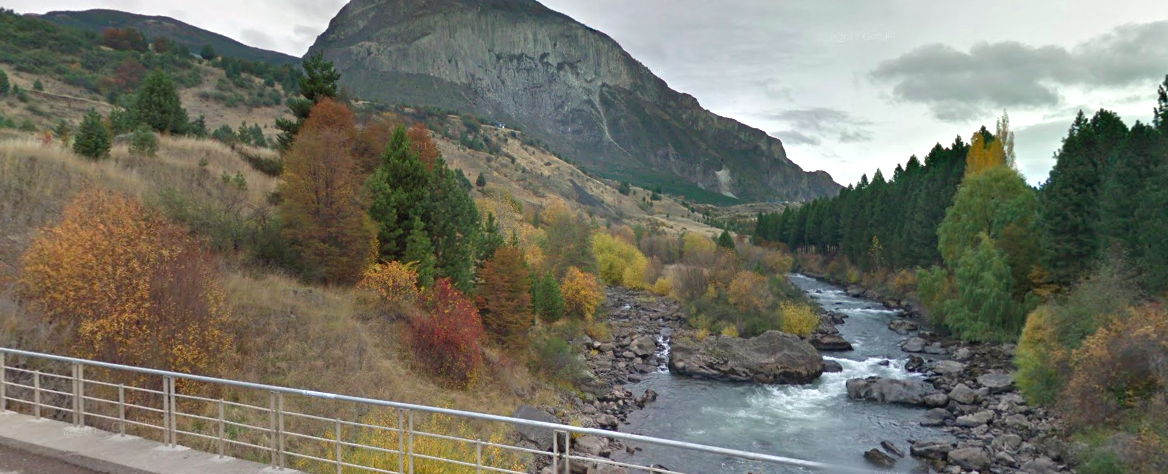
Fall foliage near Coyhaique in April, when autumn is nearing its peak.

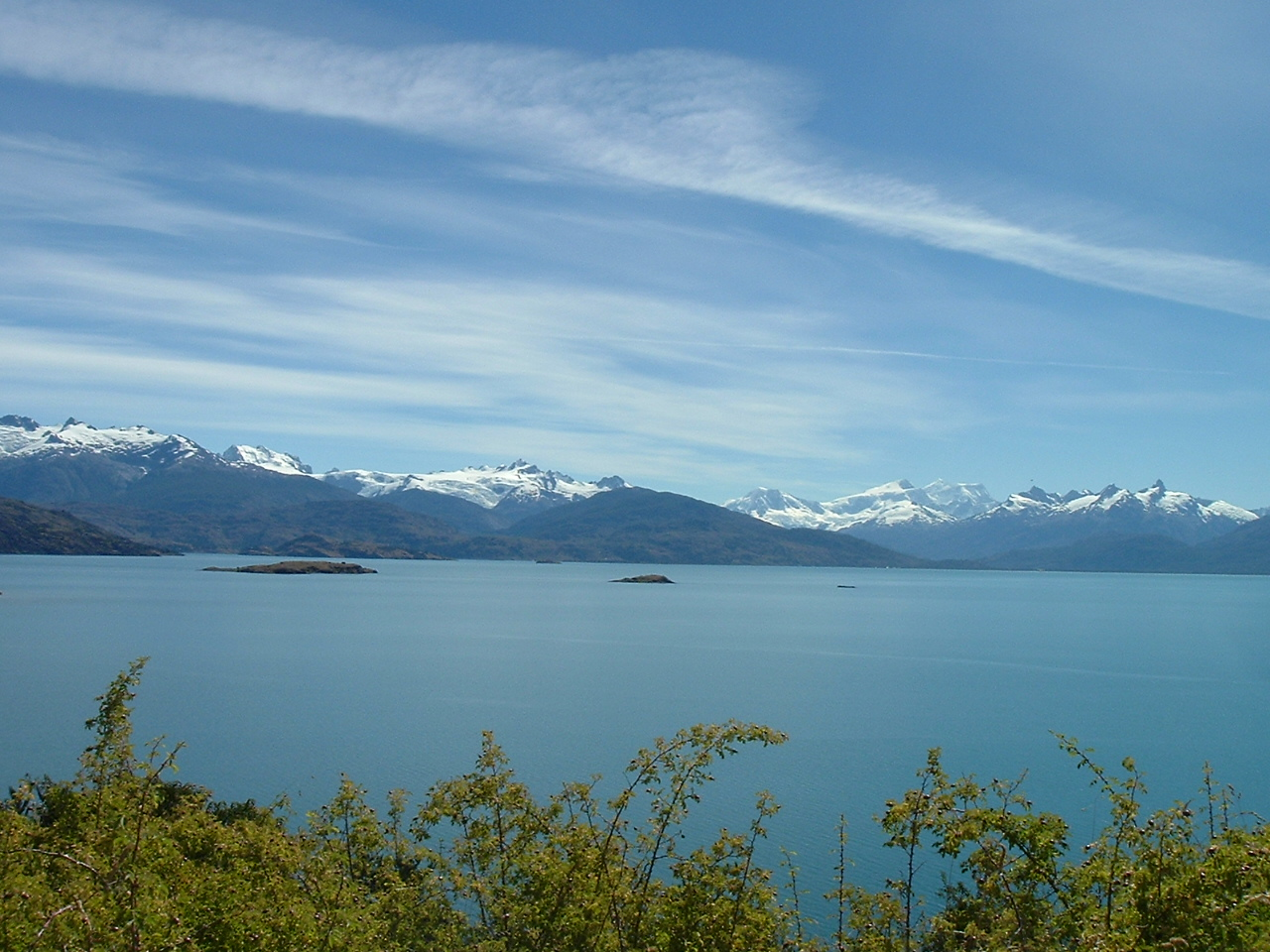
Lago General Carrera

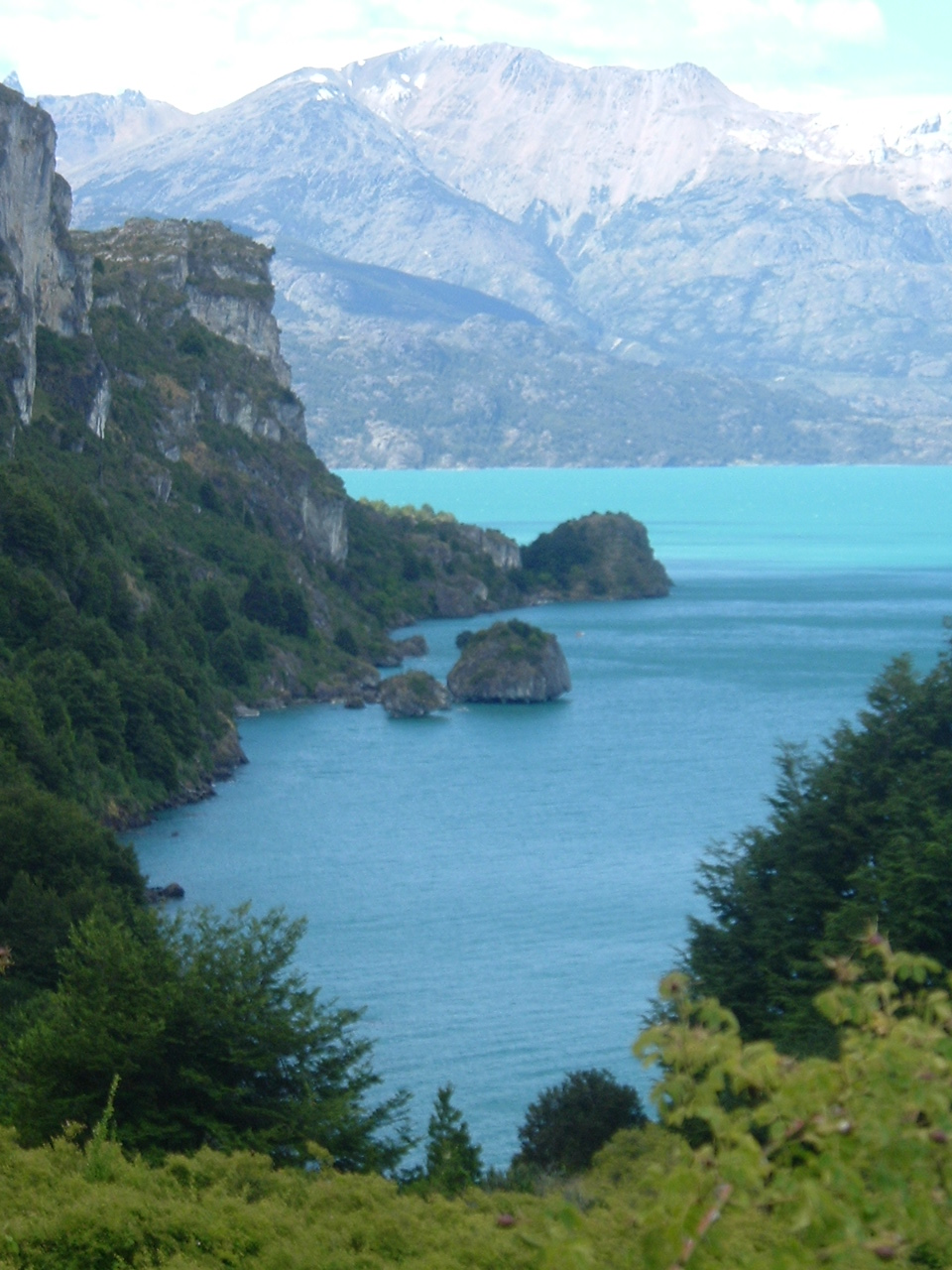
Marble Cathedral and Marble Chapel, on General Carrera Lake, Aysén Region

Aysén Region climate's is classified as a cool oceanic climate with low temperatures, abundant precipitation and strong winds. The relief found throughout the region results in different types of climate zones in the western and eastern parts. There are four distinct climate zones found within the region. Coastal areas to the west have a cool temperate climate. The coastal areas receive abundant precipitation throughout the year with mean annual precipitation that can reach 4,000 millimetres (157 in). For example, Puerto Aysen receives 2,940 mm (116 in) of precipitation per year while San Pedro Island receives 4,266 mm (168.0 in). Most of the precipitation are associated with strong winds from the northwest and the north. The winter months are usually the wettest months. Mean annual temperatures are between 8 and 9 °C (46.4 and 48.2 °F) with January being the warmest month. Temperatures decrease with latitude although owing to maritime influence which is reinforced with strong westerly winds throughout the year, temperatures are not extremely low compared to inland areas. As a result, mean temperatures rarely fall below 4 °C (39.2 °F) in the coldest months, while the diurnal range is small, averaging 5 to 7 °C (9.00 to 12.60 °F). Owing to the high precipitation year-round, relative humidity is high, averaging 87% with no months averaging below 80%. High cloud cover dominates the coastal areas year round.

In more inland areas to the east (about 40 km (25 mi) to the east of the coastal areas), precipitation is much lower, averaging 730 mm (29 in) in Cochrane to 1,200 mm (47 in) in Coyhaique. Precipitation is the highest from May to August, which receives 50% of the annual precipitation. During periods of cold temperatures, precipitation can fall as snow during these months. Being located inland and farther away from the maritime influence, the climate is more continental than coastal areas. Mean temperatures average between 8 and 10 °C (46.4 and 50.0 °F) which tends to be 1 or 2 °C (1.80 or 3.60 °F) lower than coastal areas at the same latitude. With lower precipitation, relative humidity is lower, averaging between 71% and 74% in Cochrane and Coyahique respectively. Cloud cover is lower and there are more clear days in inland areas than coastal areas.

Corresponding to the Northern Patagonian Ice Field and the Southern Patagonian Ice Field, which are located at higher altitudes, temperatures are cold enough to maintain permanent ice fields. These two ice fields receive abundant precipitation year-round, particularly in the west facing slopes of the Andes that descend to the ocean and fiords. The climate is very windy. No meteorological stations exist in the ice fields so it is estimated that the average high, average low and mean temperatures are below 0 °C (32.0 °F) in all months to maintain permanent ice fields.

The easternmost parts of the region have a cold steppe climate. Precipitation is significantly lower than the other parts of the region with mean monthly precipitation below 40 mm (1.6 in). Precipitation is concentrated from May to August where these months are responsible for 55% to 65% of the total annual precipitation. Snowfall can occur during these months owing to colder temperatures. Mean annual precipitation ranges from 300 mm (12 in) in Chile Chico to 612 mm (24.1 in) in Balmaceda. Mean temperatures are lower than areas to the east, averaging between 6 and 8 °C (42.8 and 46.4 °F). Mean summer temperatures can exceed 15 °C (59.0 °F) in Chile Chico, which permits agriculture, similar to the one in the central parts of the country. This is due to the moderating influence of General Carrera Lake which prevents temperatures from dropping too low. The vegetation is mostly shrubs owing to the low temperatures and precipitation. Relative humidity is lower, with mean annual values varying between 62% and 71%.

== Economy ==
The primary sector dominates in the regional economy, which focuses on the exploitation and processing of marine, mining, forestry, and animal resources. Aquaculture is also an important activity and the region contributes 80% of Chile's salmon output.

The archipelago and fjord region in the west is primarily oriented towards the exploitation and cultivation of marine resources. Since the 1980s, the extraction of sea urchins and locos have featured prominently in the economy of Guaitecas Archipelago. In 1985 the discovery of merluza fishing grounds in Moraleda Channel sparkled a fishing boom. In the 1990s, salmon aquaculture became an important economic activity and has remained so.

An industrial park, devoted mainly to producing frozen and, to a lesser extent, canned, products has developed around Puerto Chacabuco, Puerto Aisén, and Puerto Cisnes.

Although mining in the region, based on polymetallic deposits of zinc, gold, and silver, makes a small contribution to Chile's total mining GDP, it is significant in regional exports. A 1996 study found that the mining potential of the continental part of the region rely on small skarn deposits and epithermal gold while noticing that the metamorphic basement had some potential for mineral exploration given that it was poorly known.

Exploitation of forests and the production of yard timber, plywood, and panels for furniture is mostly geared to export markets. Animal husbandry focuses on beef cattle, sheep, and sheep's wool, part of which is exported.

The region contains about 15,240 ha of Sphagnum bogs, and since an exploitation boom in the 2010s extraction of Sphagnum in Chile is regulated by law since 2018. Due to shortcomings of the 2018 law a 2024 law establish that harvesting of Sphagnum can only be done with land-management plans approved by Servicio Agrícola y Ganadero.

The commune that concentrates most of the region's Sphagnum bogs —28.5%— is O'Higgins. Given Sphagnum's property to absorb excess water and release it during dry months overexploitation of Sphagnum may threaten the water supply in the archipelagoes of Aysén Region.

== Government and administration ==
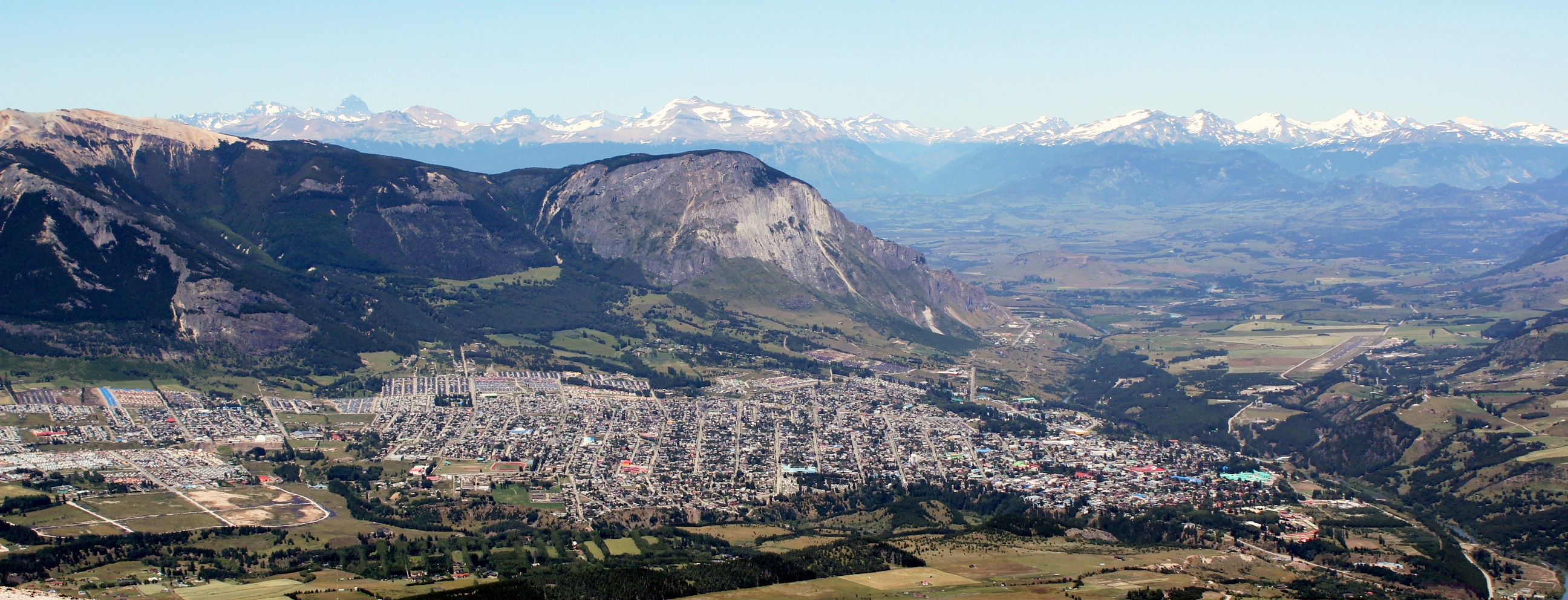
Coyhaique

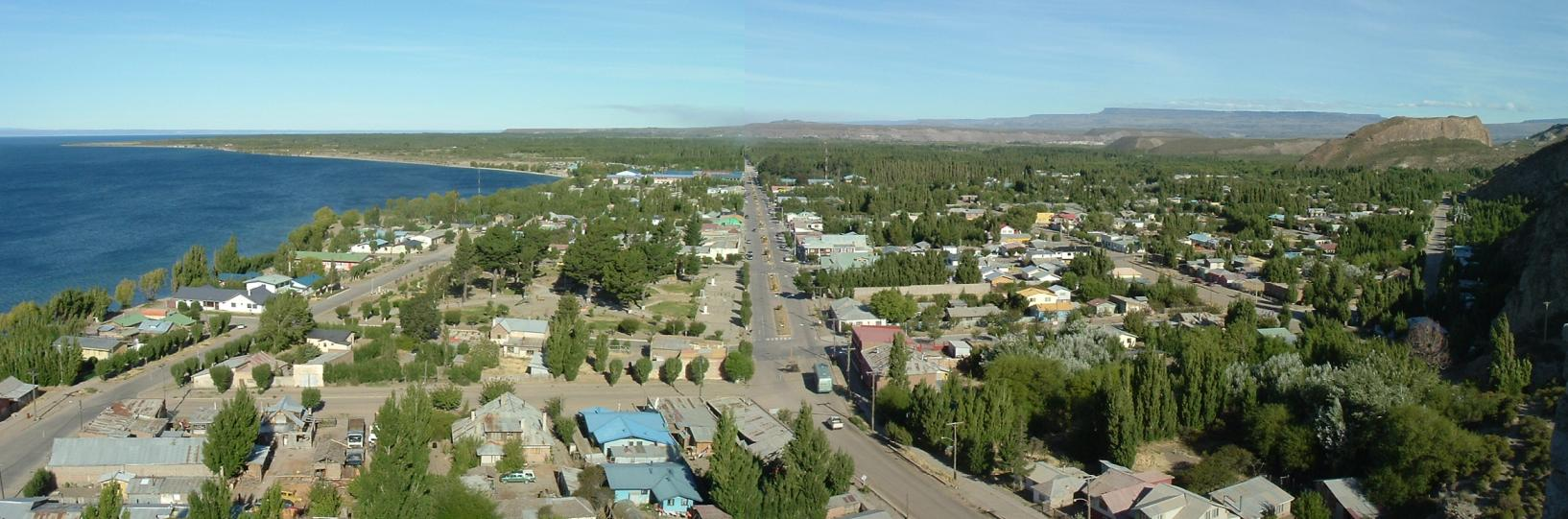
Chile Chico

Aysén del General Carlos Ibáñez del Campo Region is subdivided into 4 provinces in which each province is divided into municipalities (communes). There are a total of 10 municipalities in Aysén Region.

Aysén Province (capital: Puerto Aysén)
Aysén	Cisnes	Guaitecas
Capitán Prat Province (capital: Cochrane)
Cochrane	O'Higgins	Tortel
Coyhaique Province (capital: Coyhaique)
Coyhaique		Lago Verde
General Carrera Province (capital: Chile Chico)
Chile Chico		Río Ibáñez, Chile

According to a 2021 study Aysén Region is one of the three Chilean regions that are most prone to suffer nepotism and elite capture.

== Culture ==
The Aysén region of Chile, represents a cultural exchange mainly between Argentina and the Chiloé Archipelago which form the main settler groups that inhabit the area. The Gaucho is an important symbol of the region shaping the cuisine, dance, and music of Aysén rather than the Huaso of Central Chile. The main difference between the Guacho and Huaso is the former is involved in cattle and sheep herding, while the latter tends to be more oriented around farming. The settler heritage of the region arising from Argentina and Chiloé have also led to a unique dialect of Spanish distinct from Central Chile, especially in the areas along the border with Argentina. It is the blend of these cultures and geographic isolation that make Aysén a region distinct from the national identity of Chile which to a large degree developed around the center of the country.

== See also ==
- Aisén (disambiguation)
