= List of National Monuments of Chile in Aysén Region =

This is a list of National Monuments of Chile in Aysén del General Carlos Ibáñez del Campo Region. There are 17 National Monuments in Aysén.

== Monuments ==
	Monument name	Date listed	Province	Commune	Type	Image
1	Capilla de Mármol	22 June 1994	Río Ibáñez	General Carrera	SN	Capilla de Mármol
2	Estero de Quitralco	7 November 1996	Aysén	Aysén	SN	
3	Isla de Los Muertos	23 May 2001	Tortel	Capitán Prat	MH	
4	Pueblo de Caleta Tortel	23 May 2001	Tortel	Capitán Prat	ZT	Pueblo de Caleta Tortel
5	Puente Presidente Ibáñez	26 February 2002	Aysén	Aysén	MH	Puente Presidente Ibáñez
6	Escuela Pedro Quintana Mansilla	19 April 2005	Coyhaique	Coyhaique	MH	
7	Escuela Antigua de Cerro Castillo	5 February 2008	Río Ibáñez	General Carrera	MH	
8	Campamento Minero Puerto Cristal	5 August 2008	Río Ibáñez	General Carrera	MH	
9	Bodegas Portuarias del Río Ibáñez (now Bodegas de la Ilustre Municipalidad de Río Ibáñez)	30 January 2009	Río Ibáñez	General Carrera	MH	
10	Oficina de Tierras y Colonización de Puerto Aysén (now Segunda Comisaría de Carabineros de Puerto Aysén)	30 January 2009	Aysén	Aysén	MH	
11	Las Construcciones de la Sociedad Industrial de Aysén. La pulpería	3 November 2009	Coyhaique	Coyhaique	MH	
12	Las Construcciones de la Sociedad Industrial de Aysén. Casa de trabajadores	3 November 2009	Coyhaique	Coyhaique	MH	
13	Las Construcciones de la Sociedad Industrial de Aysén	3 November 2009	Coyhaique	Coyhaique	MH	
14	Las Construcciones de la Sociedad Industrial de Aysén. Bodega de fertilizantes	3 November 2009	Coyhaique	Coyhaique	MH	
15	Las Construcciones de la Sociedad Industrial de Aysén. La casa de administración	3 November 2009	Coyhaique	Coyhaique	MH	
16	Casona Fundacional Estancia Alto Río Císnes	3 November 2009	Lago Verde	Coyhaique	MH	
17	Casa Ludwig	6 August 2011	Cisnes	Aysén	MH	

Notes:
- "SM" stands for "Santuario de la Naturaleza" (Nature Sanctuary); "MH" for "Monumento Histórico" (Historic Monument); and "ZT" for "Zona Típica" (Typical/Picturesque Zone).
