= Pablo Galilea =

Chilean engineer and politician

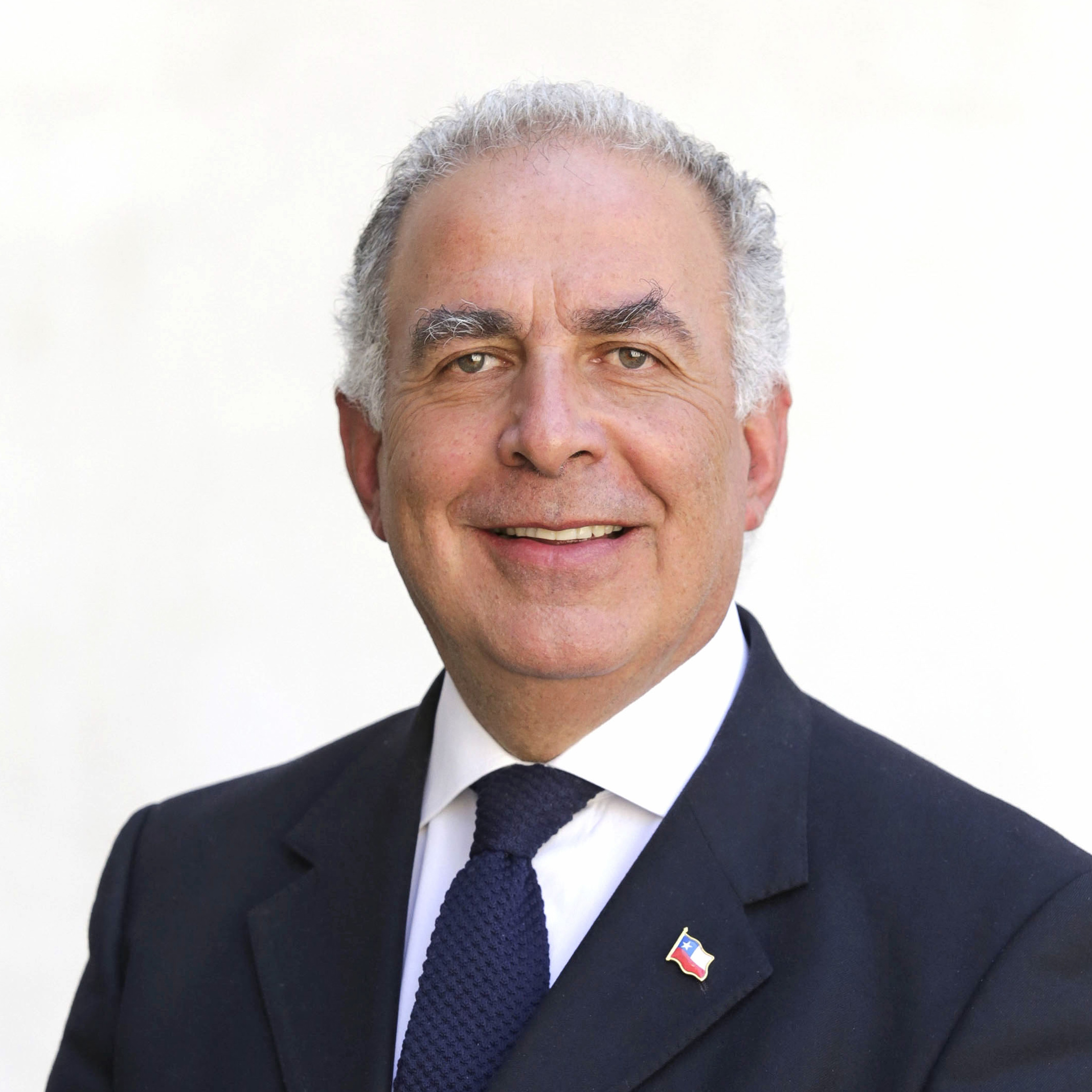

Member of the Chamber of Deputies
- In office 11 March 1998 – 11 March 2010
- Preceded by: Valentín Solís
- Succeeded by: David Sandoval

Personal details
- Born: 30 January 1963 (age 63) Coyhaique, Chile
- Party: Renovación Nacional
- Education: Austral University of Chile
- Occupation: Politician

Pablo Alberto Galilea Carrillo (Coyhaique, Chile, January 31, 1963) is a Chilean commercial engineer and politician, member of Renovación Nacional (RN). He was a deputy for district No. 59, corresponding to the communes of the Aysén Region, between 1998 and 2010, and undersecretary of fisheries in the first government of Sebastián Piñera between 2010 and 2014.

From March 2018 until May 29, 2020, he served as provincial governor of Coyhaique.

== Biography ==
He completed his basic studies at Escuela No. 1 Pedro Quintana Mancilla and secondary education at the Liceo San Felipe Benicio, both in the city of Coyhaique. Later he entered the Faculty of Economic and Administrative Sciences of the Austral University of Chile, where he graduated as a commercial engineer in 1986. From 1987 to 1990 he was manager of several companies in the private sector.

During his university days, he was a candidate for president of the student federation of his university, as well as a leader of several student movements. In Coyhaique he was founder of Renovación Nacional, later being president of the Youth Renovación Nacional in that city between 1989 and 1991. He was elected councilor for Coyhaique between 1992 and 1996, and in that last year he was regional president of RN.

In 1997 he was elected deputy representing district No. 59, comprising the communes of the Aysén Region, being later re-elected in 2001 and 2005. In 2009, he ran again for the same district, but was not elected.

On March 11, 2010, he took over as undersecretary of fisheries in the first government of Sebastián Piñera. He held his position throughout the Piñera administration, until March 11, 2014.

During the second government of Sebastián Piñera in 2018, he was appointed governor of the province of Coyhaique.
