= El Toqui mine =

Zinc-gold mine in Chile

El Toqui
- Location in Chile
- Location: Aysén Region, Chile; 45°02′05″S 71°56′34″W
- Products: Copper, gold, silver, lead
- Company: Sociedad Contractual Minera El Toqui

El Toqui mine is a polymetallic zinc-gold mine in Chile. Besides silver and lead are also mined in El Toqui. The mine is owned by Laguna Gold through its wholly owned subsidiary company Sociedad Contractual Minera el Toqui. Laguna Gold purchased the mine from Nyrstar in 2016. Nyrstar had owned the mine since its 2011 purchase of Breakwater Resources which had in turn purchased it from Barrick Gold Corporation in 1997.

The mine is powered by a 4 Mw diesel power plant and a 2 Mw hydroelectric power plant.

As of 2025 the mine was exporting zinc concentrate to Lianyungang in China through the port of Chacabuco in Aysén Fjord.

== See also ==
- Cutter Cove, a polymetallic copper-gold-zinc mine near the Strait of Magellan last active in 1974
- Los Domos, a nearby gold mine project
