= Alumysa =

Alumysa was a proposed aluminium smelter to be built in Puerto Chacabuco in Aysén Fjord, Chile. The project began to be planned in the early 1990s, it presented its environmental impact assessment in 2001 and was suspended in August 2003. The project was opposed by salmon farm companies operating in the area for the water pollution they claimed the Alumysa would produce. The project was being developed by the Canadian mining company Noranda. Alumysa was planned to import aluminium oxides to produce 440,000 tons of aluminium annually. Noranda has cited a lack of stable rules as the reason for the withdrawal of the project. Other proposed reasons for the suspension of the project include that production cost turned out to be higher than originally thought given a rise in the cost of energy and the fact the international aluminium market was by the mid-2000s more competitive with countries in Middle East and Russia having constructed aluminium smelters that used cheap energy.

== See also ==
- Canadian mining in Latin America and the Caribbean
- El Toqui, polymetallic mine in Aysén Region
- HidroAysén, a hydropower project in Aysén Region cancelled in 2017
- List of copper smelters in Chile
- Los Domos, a gold mine project in Aysén Region
