= David Sandoval =

Chilean politician

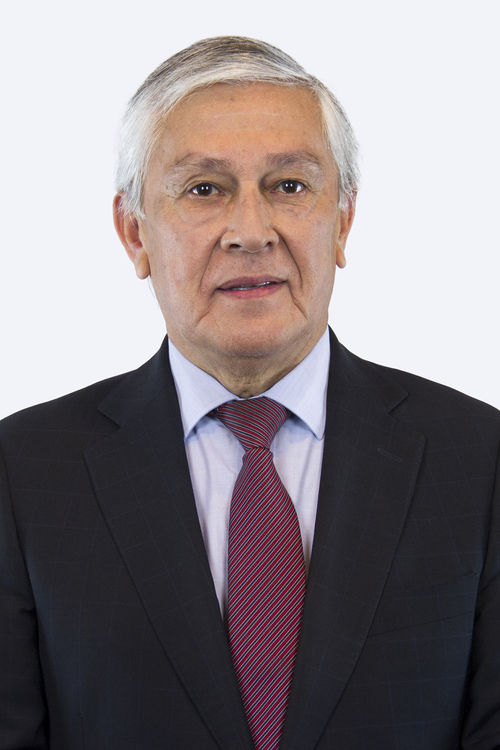

Member of the Senate
- In office 11 March 2018 – 11 March 2026
- Preceded by: Creation of the Circunscription
- Constituency: 14th Circunscription (Aysén Region)

Member of the Chamber of Deputies
- In office 11 March 2010 – 11 March 2018
- Preceded by: Pablo Galilea
- Succeeded by: Dissolution of the District

Mayor of Coyhaique
- In office 6 December 2000 – 6 December 2008

Mayor of Cochrane
- In office 1989 – 6 December 2000
- Appointed by: Augusto Pinochet (originally)
- Succeeded by: Patricio Ulloa

Mayor of Chile Chico
- In office 1986–1989
- Appointed by: Augusto Pinochet

Personal details
- Born: 20 October 1952 (age 73) Coyhaique, Chile
- Party: UDI (2003–)
- Other political affiliations: RN (–2001)
- Spouse: Luisa Acuña Vogt
- Children: Three
- Parent(s): David Sandoval; Ana Plaza Guzmán
- Education: University of Chile
- Occupation: Politician
- Profession: Geographer

David Sergio Sandoval Plaza (born 20 October 1952) is a Chilean politician who currently serves as a member of the Senate of his country.

== Biography ==
He was born on 20 October 1952 in Santiago. He is the son of David Sandoval Albarrán and Ana Plaza Guzmán.

He is married to Luisa Acuña Vogt and is the father of three children: Andrés, Pamela, and Lucas.

In 1973, he obtained the title of General Accountant from the Instituto Comercial de Aplicaciones de Santiago. He later entered the University of Chile, where he earned a degree in Geography in 1980.

He worked at the Calicanto Savings and Loan Association and at the Coca-Cola bottling company.

After obtaining his professional degree, he moved to Cochrane, where he worked in the private sector. He later left this position after being appointed Municipal Secretary of the Mayor of Cochrane, Lorenzo Ruedas.

== Political career ==
On 12 June 1986, he was appointed Mayor of the commune of Chile Chico by the military regime. On 11 August 1989, in accordance with the legislation in force at the time, he was appointed Mayor of the commune of Cochrane by the Regional Development Council of the XI Region of Aysén del General Carlos Ibáñez del Campo, remaining in office until 1992.

In the first democratic municipal elections of 1992 and again in 1996, he was elected Mayor of Cochrane, representing National Renewal, completing a total of eight years as mayor of the municipality.

In 2000, he was elected Mayor of Coyhaique for National Renewal. In July 2001, he resigned from the party.

In 2004, he was re-elected Mayor of Coyhaique, this time representing the Independent Democratic Union, a position he held until 2008.

In 2017, he ran for the Senate of Chile. In the general elections held on 17 November of that year, he was elected Senator for the 14th Senatorial District, Aysén del General Carlos Ibáñez del Campo Region, with 7,320 votes, equivalent to 20.51% of the valid votes cast, obtaining the highest vote share in the district.
