= Presidente Ibáñez Bridge =

Coordinates: 45°24′16.7″S 72°41′4.2″W

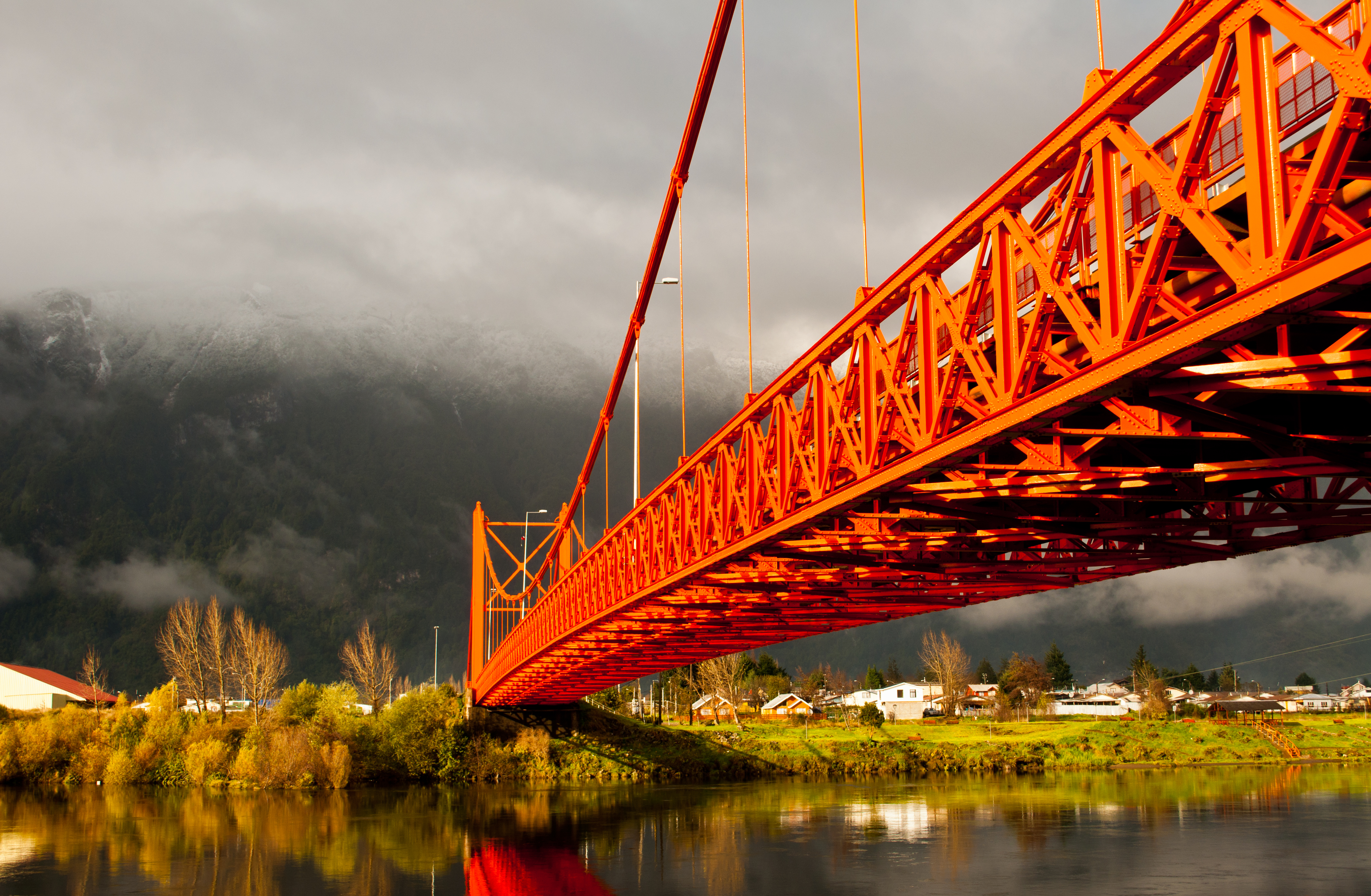
Presidente Ibáñez Bridge.

The Presidente Ibáñez Bridge (Spanish: Puente Presidente Ibáñez) is a single-span suspension bridge that crosses the Aysén River. It is in Puerto Aysén, Aysén del General Carlos Ibáñez del Campo Region, Chile. The bridge was declared a National Monument of Chile in 2002.

Work on the bridge began in 1961, during the government of President Jorge Alessandri, and was completed five years later during the government of Eduardo Frei Montalva, in 1966.

The bridge has two 25-meter-high metal towers, which rest on reinforced concrete bases. It also features eight steel suspension cables and 22 vertical suspender rods on each side. The bridge carries Chile Route 240.
