= GXQ =

GXQ may refer to:

- Division code for Ganxian District, a district in Ganzhou, Jiangxi Province, China
- Postal code for Għaxaq, Malta
- IATA code for Teniente Vidal Airfield, an airport serving Coyhaique, Aysén Region, Chile
