= Simpson River =

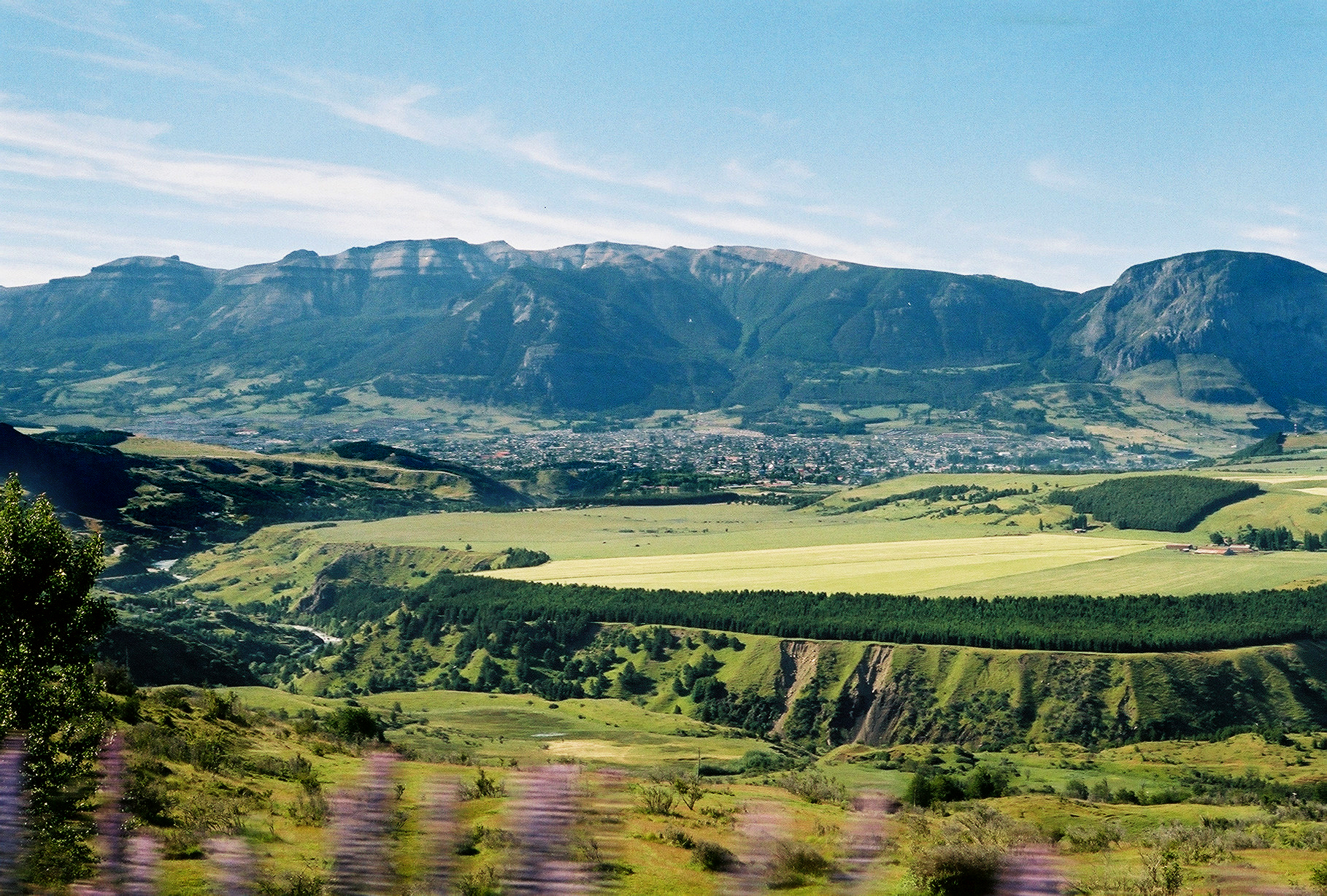
- Coihaique in the distance

Location
- Country: Chile

Physical characteristics
- Mouth: Aisén River
  - coordinates: 45°24′21″S 72°29′53″W
- Length: 88 km (55 mi)
- Basin size: 3,712 km^{2} (1,433 sq mi)
- Discharge
  - average: 47.2 m^{3}/s (1,670 cu ft/s)

Simpson River is a river of Chile located in the Aysén del General Carlos Ibáñez del Campo Region. The river originates east of the Andes mountains. It forms the western boundary of the city of Coihaique, which is bordered on the north by the Coihaique River, a tributary of the Simpson. In its inferior course, the river flows through Río Simpson National Reserve, which is named after the river. In this area, the river roughly parallels the Route CH-240, which connects Coihaique with Puerto Aisén and Puerto Chacabuco.

The river is named after navy hydrographer Enrique Simpson who explored the area in the 1870s.

== Tributaries ==
The Blanco River gushes through canyons in the northeastern part of Reserva Nacional Cerro Castillo. The river corridor is a veritable geological wonder with a myriad of canyons composed of dark basalt, limestone, shale and sandstone. There is also the wonderful sight of Cerro Castillo (2675 m), highest peak in the region, thus named because it resembles a medieval castle.
