= Coyhaique =

City and Commune in Aysén, Chile

Coyhaique Coihaique
- City and Commune
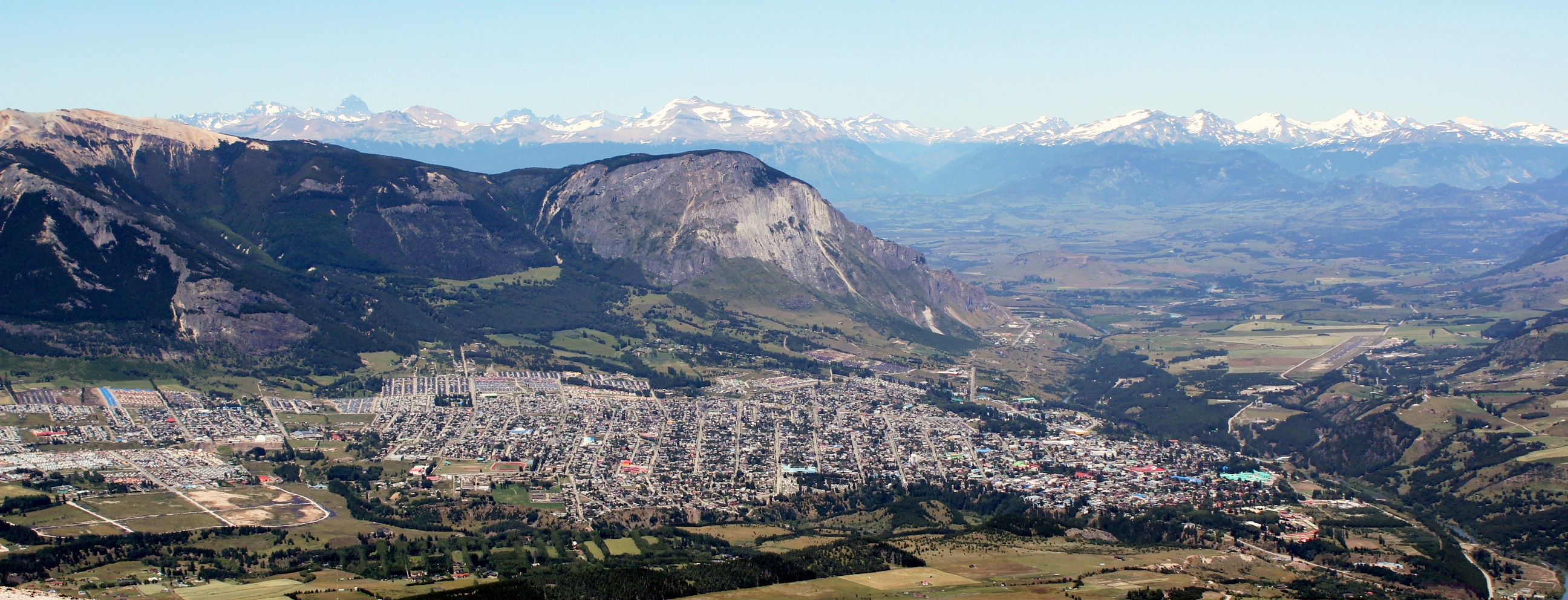
- Panoramic view of the city

- Flag Coat of arms Location of the Coihaique commune in Aisén Region Location in Chile Coyhaique (Chile)
- Coordinates (city): 45°34′S 72°04′W
- Country: Chile
- Region: Aysén
- Province: Coyhaique
- Founded as: Baquedano
- Founded: October 12, 1929

Government
  - Type: Municipality
  - Alcalde: Carlos Gatica Villegas (PDC)

Area
  - Total: 7,320.5 km^{2} (2,826.5 sq mi)
- Elevation: 302 m (991 ft)

Population (2024 Census)
  - Total: 57,823
  - Density: 7.8988/km^{2} (20.458/sq mi)
- Demonym: Coyhaiquinos/as

Sex
  - Men: 28,170
  - Women: 29,653
- Time zone: UTC−3 (CLT)
- Postal code: 5950000
- Area code: 56 + 67
- Climate: Cfb
- Website: Official website (in Spanish)

Coyhaique (Spanish pronunciation: [koˈʝajke]), also spelled Coihaique in Patagonia, is the capital city of both the Coyhaique Province and the Aysén Region of Chile. Founded by settlers in 1929, it is a young city. Until the twentieth century, Chile showed little interest in exploiting the remote Aisén region. It lies east of the Andes mountain range, in Chilean Patagonia, at an average altitude of 310 m above sea level, at the confluence of the Simpson and Coyhaique rivers.

The city was founded on October 12, 1929 under the name Baquedano, in honor of the Chilean general Manuel Baquedano. Its name was changed to the current one in 1934 to distinguish it from another locality of the same name in the Antofagasta Region. Its establishment aimed to facilitate the colonization of the area, as well as to support the operations of the Sociedad Industrial de Aysén, which had maintained its facilities in the locality since 1906—currently protected as a National Historic Monument.

Shortly after its founding, the city experienced rapid growth, becoming a municipality in 1948 and the regional capital in 1974, within the framework of the regionalization process promoted by the military dictatorship.

Its communal territory covers more than 7,000 km² and includes the localities of Balmaceda, El Blanco, Villa Ortega, Villa Frei, Valle Simpson, Alto Baguales, Ñirehuao, and Lago Largo, among others. Within its urban area are located the headquarters of the Regional Government of Aysén and the regional council, the Regional Presidential Delegate, the Court of Appeals, as well as the corresponding regional ministerial secretariats and the main public services.

The city is connected to the rest of the region by various roads, mainly the Carretera Austral, opened in the 1980s—and to the rest of Chile via Balmaceda Airport, which handles almost all of Aysén’s air traffic.

== Etymology ==
The name Coyhaique corresponds to the Spanish adaptation of a term in the Aonikenk or Tehuelche language, derived from qoj (‘lagoon’) and ajke (‘camp’), meaning “camp by the lagoon.” This name originally referred to several places and was assigned to this one by non-Indigenous explorers.

For many years, the city’s official name was written with an “i” (Coihaique), but the form Coyhaique continued to be preferred by local authorities and residents, as is also the case with Aisén/Aysén. In the mid-2000s, the orthography used by the Military Geographic Institute was changed, officially establishing the spelling Coyhaique.

== History ==
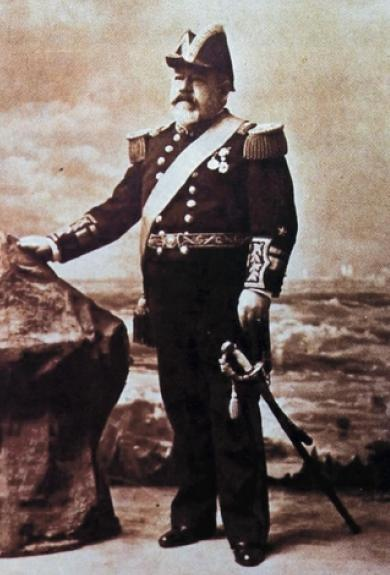
Captain Enrique Simpson Baeza led hydrographic expeditions to the Aysén Region; during the third of these, on December 19, 1872, he reached the Coyhaique area

=== Occupation of the territory ===
At the end of the 19th century, the occupation of the area began by Chileans who arrived mainly from two origins. On one hand, settlers came from Araucanía, via Argentine Patagonia, to the valleys of the Aysén, Simpson, and Cisnes rivers, and to the Lake General Carrera basin. On the other hand, many colonizers of the maritime coast and the Guaitecas Islands came from the Chiloé Archipelago. At the dawn of the 20th century, larger-scale economic activities began, led by livestock companies, which allowed the region to be permanently settled.

The first recorded visit to the area that today constitutes the city of Coyhaique corresponds to Captain Enrique Simpson Baeza, who on December 19, 1872, observed part of the area after navigating up the Aysén River for eighty days as part of his third hydrographic expedition.

As part of the colonization process promoted by the Chilean state following the 1902 Arbitral Award, issued by British King Edward VII to set the border with the Argentine Republic, the occupation and settlement of the territory through private initiative was encouraged by leasing large tracts of land. Thus, in 1903, the valleys of the Coyhaique, Mañihuales, and Ñirehuao rivers were granted on a twenty-year concession to Luis Aguirre, a resident of Punta Arenas. He later transferred his rights to the Sociedad Industrial de Aysén (S.I.A.), an entity formed by Magellanic capitalists led by Mauricio Braun.

Shortly after acquiring the land, clearing began for livestock use, a process that involved slash-and-burn or forest fires over vast areas of native forest, in some cases lasting years. In 1906, the company established its main facilities at a place known as “Pampa del Corral”, at the confluence of the Simpson and Coyhaique rivers, several of which are now protected as a historical monument. The site was strategically located, with overland connections to Puerto Aysén and the settlement of Balmaceda.

As part of its obligations, the S.I.A. was required to build works such as roads and to settle one hundred immigrants of Saxon origin in the territory. However, despite its economic successes, the company failed to fulfill this commitment. During the same period, many private individuals—known as free settlers—occupied parts of the lands leased by the company, mainly in the Simpson River Valley.

In the early 1920s, the Chilean state, prompted by figures such as diplomat and poet Víctor Domingo Silva—set aside its initial disinterest and intervened more decisively in the area, creating the Territory of Aysén in 1927, with its capital in Puerto Aysén. Shortly thereafter, in 1928, at the initiative of Intendant Luis Marchant González, the establishment of the town of Baquedano was ordered. The founding ceremony took place on October 12, 1929, although the settlement was effectively consolidated later.

=== Creation of Balmaceda ===
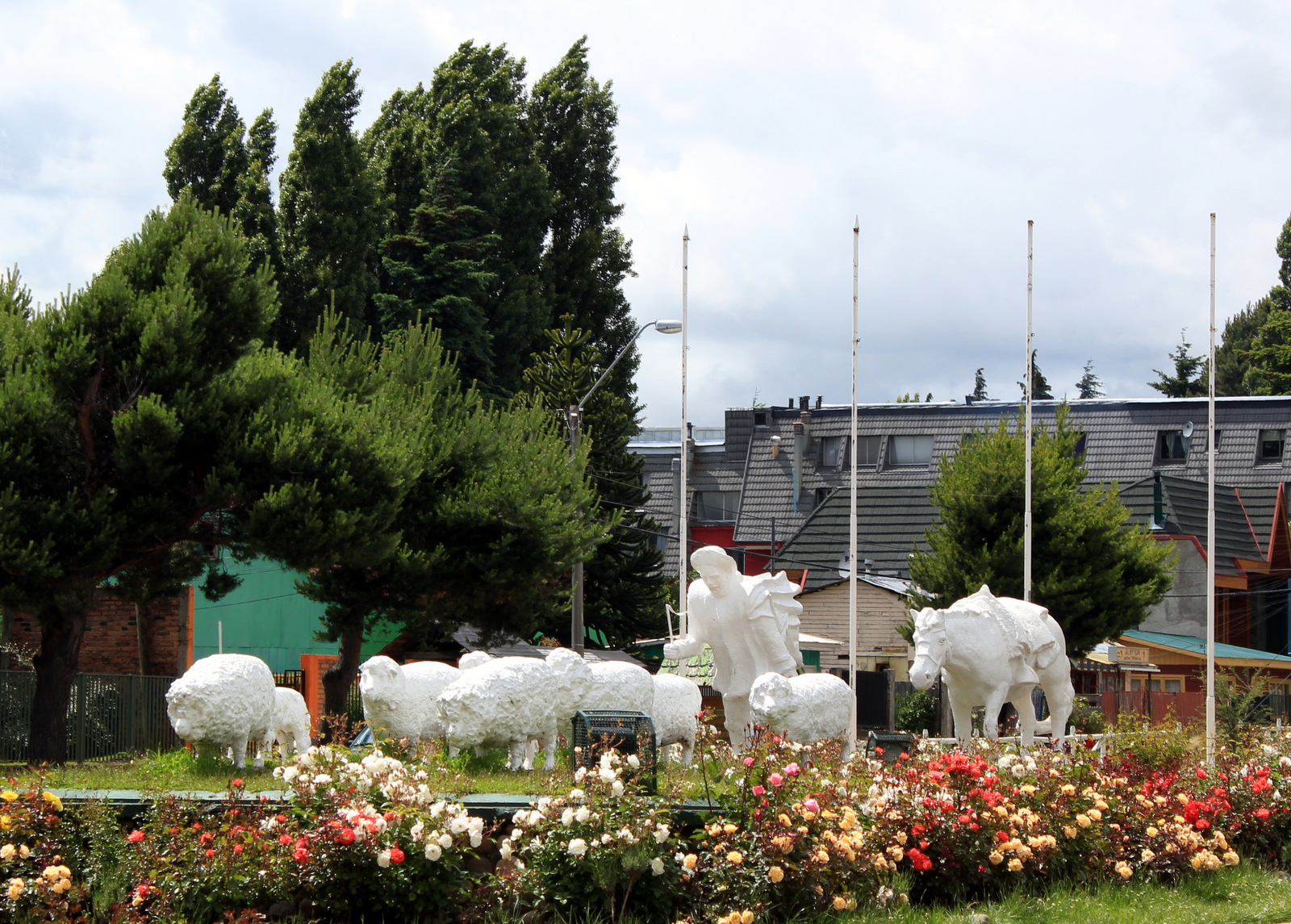
The Monumento al Ovejero (Monument to the Shepherd) (1944) is an urban landmark of the city. Created by sculptor Germán Montero Carvallo, it was donated by the city of Punta Arenas, where another version of the same monument exists.

The establishment of an urban center in the central zone of the territory enabled rapid growth, eventually eclipsing the town of Balmaceda (founded in 1917) and, at the same time, creating an urban base in the region’s main livestock area. By the mid-1930s, the large leasing companies began to withdraw, as did spontaneous individual colonization, allowing the development of the new city. From then on, state action to settle population and invest in public works became dominant, a situation that continues in the Aysén Region to this day.

The 1940 Chilean census recorded more than 4,000 inhabitants in the Coyhaique delegation—compared to 5,790 in the Puerto Aysén delegation. This sustained growth allowed for the establishment of the municipality, which was formalized on July 1, 1947. Later, in 1959, Law No. 13,375 created the Department of Coyhaique, at a time when the city had already surpassed the port as the region’s main population center.

In the 1970s, coinciding with the crisis in livestock farming, economic activity came to depend largely on public investment, with urban areas becoming the center and engine of regional activity. On May 21, 1971, television arrived in the city with the opening of Channel 8 of Televisión Nacional de Chile, initially an independent station that later formed a small regional network.

=== Regional capital ===
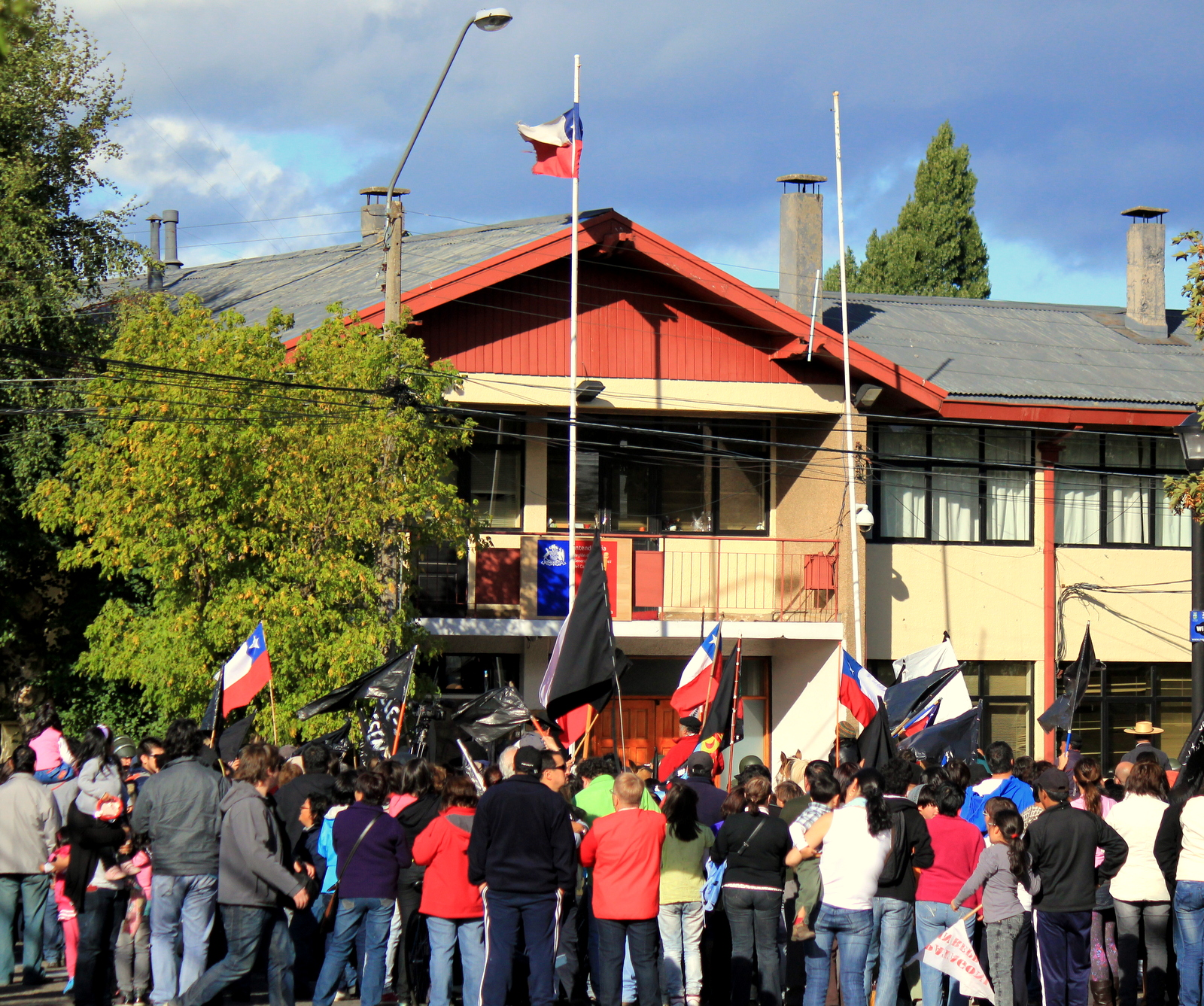
Demonstration in front of the Regional Intendancy during the protests in the Aysén Region in 2012

In 1974, as part of the administrative reorganization initiated by the military dictatorship following the coup d’état, the regional capital was transferred from Puerto Aysén to Coyhaique. Likewise, in 1976, Augusto Pinochet Ugarte and the Chilean Army strongly promoted the construction of the Carretera Austral, which significantly created, improved, and developed the region’s road connectivity, allowing for the first time—overland access for many families across much of the area.

At the beginning of the 21st century, the city is seen to have grown steadily, while its isolation from the rest of Chile has been substantially reduced. Partly due to perceived neglect by the government in Santiago and the high cost of living resulting from ongoing connectivity problems, a series of protests occurred in February 2012, disrupting the city’s usual tranquility.

== Geography ==
The commune of Coyhaique spans an area of 43,297 km^{2} (16,717 sq mi). It is surrounded by rivers (Simpson and Coyhaique) and by mountains. The mountains may be snow-covered throughout the year, thus Coihaique is sometimes called the city of eternal snow.

=== Climate ===
Under the Köppen climate classification, Coyhaique has an oceanic climate (Cfb), though it is considerably less wet than coastal settlements like Puerto Montt or Puerto Aysén since the coastal mountains provide shielding from the westerly winds. Temperatures are moderate during the months of November through April, while from May until October, temperatures are chilly and accompanied by the possibility of snowfall.

Climate data for Coyhaique (Teniente Vidal Airfield) 1991–2020, extremes 1952–present
Month	Jan	Feb	Mar	Apr	May	Jun	Jul	Aug	Sep	Oct	Nov	Dec	Year
Record high °C (°F)	35.6 (96.1)	35.7 (96.3)	31.5 (88.7)	25.2 (77.4)	20.4 (68.7)	18.6 (65.5)	16.2 (61.2)	19.0 (66.2)	23.1 (73.6)	27.5 (81.5)	31.0 (87.8)	32.2 (90.0)	35.7 (96.3)
Mean daily maximum °C (°F)	19.5 (67.1)	20.1 (68.2)	17.4 (63.3)	13.6 (56.5)	9.4 (48.9)	6.0 (42.8)	5.8 (42.4)	8.3 (46.9)	11.5 (52.7)	13.9 (57.0)	15.9 (60.6)	18.0 (64.4)	13.3 (55.9)
Daily mean °C (°F)	14.2 (57.6)	14.3 (57.7)	12.2 (54.0)	9.1 (48.4)	6.0 (42.8)	3.1 (37.6)	2.7 (36.9)	4.6 (40.3)	6.9 (44.4)	9.0 (48.2)	10.9 (51.6)	12.9 (55.2)	8.8 (47.8)
Mean daily minimum °C (°F)	8.9 (48.0)	8.5 (47.3)	6.9 (44.4)	4.6 (40.3)	2.6 (36.7)	0.2 (32.4)	−0.4 (31.3)	0.9 (33.6)	2.2 (36.0)	4.0 (39.2)	5.9 (42.6)	7.8 (46.0)	4.3 (39.7)
Record low °C (°F)	0.0 (32.0)	−1.0 (30.2)	−8.0 (17.6)	−8.4 (16.9)	−11.0 (12.2)	−25.2 (−13.4)	−18.0 (−0.4)	−13.4 (7.9)	−8.8 (16.2)	−7.3 (18.9)	−4.2 (24.4)	−2.3 (27.9)	−25.2 (−13.4)
Average precipitation mm (inches)	57.8 (2.28)	46.7 (1.84)	72.8 (2.87)	97.2 (3.83)	121.8 (4.80)	140.4 (5.53)	118.7 (4.67)	117.0 (4.61)	61.1 (2.41)	70.6 (2.78)	61.7 (2.43)	57.3 (2.26)	1,023.1 (40.28)
Average precipitation days (≥ 1.0 mm)	7.7	6.8	9.1	10.5	13.4	14.2	12.6	12.9	9.4	8.6	8.3	7.6	121.2
Average relative humidity (%)	59	60	64	71	80	82	81	74	67	61	59	59	68
Mean monthly sunshine hours	250.6	224.5	191.5	137.1	79.5	54.5	72.5	114.1	156.8	208.1	224.6	238.6	1,952.4
Source 1: Dirección Meteorológica de Chile (humidity 1970–2000)
Source 2: NOAA (precipitation days 1991–2020)

== Demographics ==
Historical population
Year	Pop.	±% p.a.
1970	23,695	—
1982	37,305	+3.85%
1992	43,297	+1.50%
2002	50,041	+1.46%
2017	57,818	+0.97%
2024	57,823	+0.00%
Source: "Censo de Población y Vivienda". National Statistics Institute.

According to the 2002 census of the National Statistics Institute, Coyhaique has 50,041 inhabitants (25,453 men and 24,588 women). Of these, 44,850 (89.6%) lived in urban areas and 5,191 (10.4%) in rural areas. The population grew by 15.6% (6,744 persons) between the 1992 and 2002 censuses.

== Administration ==
As a commune, Coyhaique is a third-level administrative division of Chile administered by a municipal council, headed by an alcalde who is directly elected every four years. The 2012-2016 alcalde is Alejandro Huala Canumán (PS). He was preceded by Omar Muñoz Sierra (UDI) from 2008 to 2012 and David Sandoval Plaza (also UDI), who served from 2000 to 2008.

Within the electoral divisions of Chile, Coyhaique is represented in the Chamber of Deputies by René Alinco (PDC) and the former mayor David Sandoval as part of the 59th electoral district, which includes the entire Aysén Region. The commune is represented in the Senate by Antonio Horvath Kiss (RN) and Patricio Walker Prieto (PDC) as part of the 18th senatorial constituency (Aysén Region).

== Society and culture ==
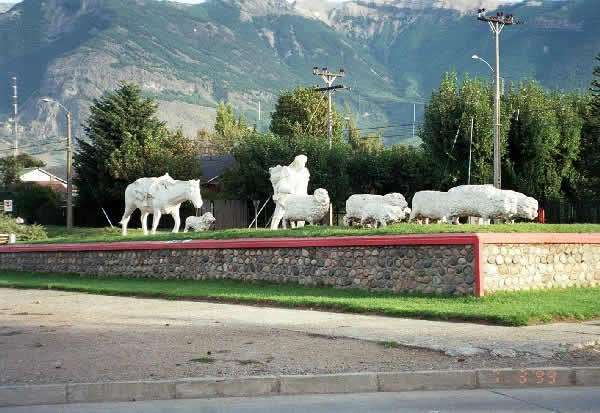
Monument to the shepherd

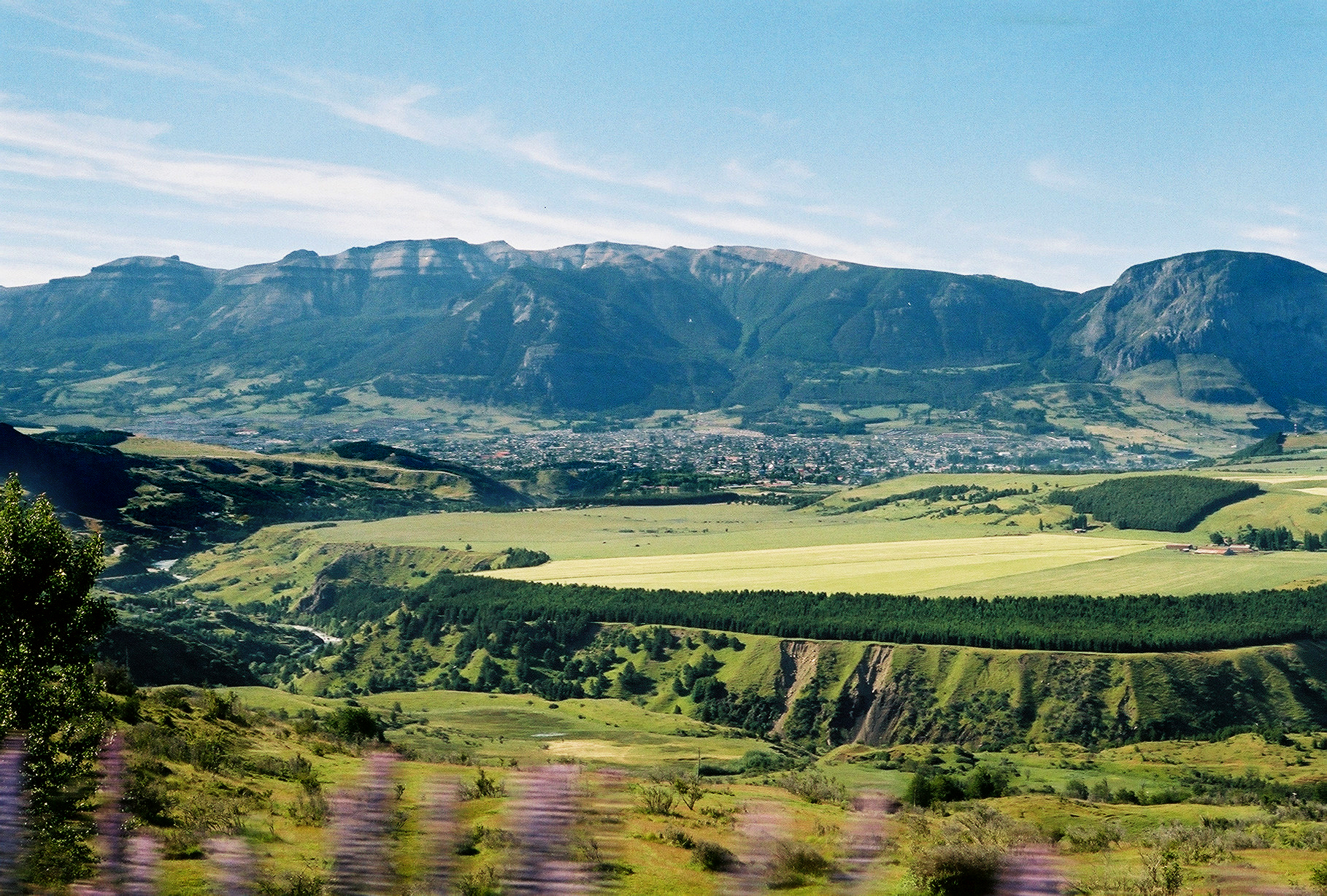
View of Coihaique

The town square is laid out in the shape of a pentagon in honor of the Carabineros, the national police force. A Carabinero general was one of the town's founders. Novelist and poet, Ivonne Coñuecar, is from Coyhaique and was awarded the Santiago Municipal Literature Award in 2019. Since 2015 Coyhaique hosts the FIMP, Festival Internacional de Música de la Patagonia, a major initiative in this field.

== Economy ==
In 2018, the number of registered companies in Coyhaique was 1,965. The Economic Complexity Index that same year was 1.62, while the economic activities with the highest Revealed Comparative Advantage (RCA) Index were Extraterritorial Organizations and Bodies (83.36), Extraction of Other Metal Ores (62.36), and Livestock Brokerage and Fairs (23.23).

=== Renewable energy ===
As a measure to mitigate air pollution in the commune, authorities included Coyhaique in the “Comuna Energética” (Energy Community) plan of the Ministry of Energy, with the purpose of promoting energy efficiency and the use of renewable energy, by developing a local energy strategy plan aimed at replacing the use of fossil fuels and firewood, mainly for household heating, while encouraging the use of thermal energy derived from electric power generation produced by wind energy. There are projects for the creation of wind farms, as well as for domestic wind turbines. The Alto Baguales Wind Farm, owned by Edelaysen, was inaugurated in 2001 and features turbines from the German company Enercon, with a total gross generation capacity of 3.8 MW.

== International relations ==
The city of Coyhaique hosts a number of international relations institutions, such as the Regional Unit of International Affairs (URAI) of the Regional Government of Aysén, responsible for analyzing and managing the region’s bilateral and multilateral relations with Latin America and the rest of the world; the International Affairs Commission of the Regional Council of Aysén; the regional office of the National Migration Service; the regional office of the General Directorate for Export Promotion (ProChile); and the Department of Migration and International Police of the Investigations Police.

In the field of higher education internationalization, the main actor in Coyhaique is the International Relations Unit of the University of Aysén.

== Transport and tourism ==
Travellers arrive by air through the local airport, by sea through ships that dock at Puerto Chacabuco (near Puerto Aysén, about one hour to the west of Coyhaique), and by road. Two border crossings near Coyhaique allow entry into Argentina. Fly fishing is popular along its rivers and lakes.

LAN has three daily flights from Santiago to Balmaceda Airport, located 40 km (25 mi) from Coyhaique. Other airlines also provide services. Connections from Balmaceda airport to points further south in Chile will often require a connection in Puerto Montt.

Its sole ski resort, El Fraile, provides two ski lifts and a couple of tracks but no on-site lodging.

Hotspots

- Simpson and Coyhaique Rivers, well known for fly fishing
- Piedra del Indio, an Indian-shaped rock besides the Simpson River
- Happy Stone, a large rock in the middle of a plain where young people go to party

== Pollution ==
A 2018 study by the World Health Organization (WHO) looking at 4,357 cities in 108 countries worldwide showed Coyhaique to have the worst air quality in the Americas and ranked it 139th unhealthiest in the world.

This is mostly due to wood smoke from fires the residents light for warmth in the winter months of June and July. Because the city is located between two mountainous ridges, the smoke cannot be dispersed down the valley and away and heat inversion compresses it into a dense cloud of smoke.

In May 2016, the Chilean government also declared Coyhaique "saturated" by harmful fine particles (PM2.5) which are linked to cardiopulmonary diseases and lung cancer.
