= Chilean corvette Chacabuco (1866) =

19th c. ship of the Chilean Navy

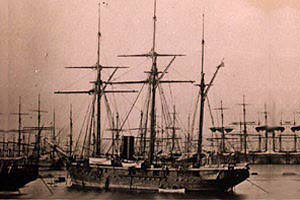

Chile
- Name: Chacabuco
- Namesake: Battle of Chacabuco
- Builder: Ravenhill, London, United Kingdom
- Launched: 1866
- Commissioned: 1868
- Fate: Scrapped 1890

General characteristics
- Class & type: Corvette
- Displacement: 1101
- Length: 216 ft 6 in (66.0 m)
- Beam: 33 ft 4 in (10.2 m)
- Draught: 18 ft 0 in (5.5 m)
- Installed power: 1.200 HP
- Propulsion: Maudsley return connecting rod engine
- Speed: 9 kn
- Complement: 200
- Armament: 3 Armstrong guns 7 in, 2 guns 70 lb, 4 guns 40 lb

The Chilean corvette Chacabuco was a late 19th-century ship of the Chilean Navy. Commanded by Enrique Simpson in the early 1870s, the ship participated in the exploration of the fjords and archipelagoes of Aysén Region in northern Patagonia. These travels led to the re-discovery of San Rafael Lake and the establishment of Aysén Fjord as the principal gateway to the interior of Aysén Region. In 1876 Chacabuco transported governor of Magallanes Diego Dublé Almeyda to the Falkland Islands bringing back sheep, thus initiating the Patagonian sheep farming boom of the late 19th century. From 1879 onwards the corvette fought in the War of the Pacific.

Puerto Chacabuco in Aysén Fjord is named after the ship.
