= List of National Monuments of Chile by region =

The National Monuments of Chile (Spanish: Monumentos Nacionales de Chile) are structures, items and places which are recognized by the National Monuments Council (Consejo de Monumentos Nacionales) for representing the country's cultural heritage. They are all protected by law.

As of June 2012, 1,269 structures, items and places have been recognized as National Monuments of Chile.

== Tabular listing ==
Region	Number of monuments	Earliest declared	Latest declared	Example
Arica y Parinacota	28	13 July 1967	6 April 2009	Aduana de Arica
Tarapacá	73	6 July 1951	27 January 2009	Salar de Huasco
Antofagasta	81	6 July 1951	13 March 2009	Iglesia de San Francisco de Chiu Chiu
Atacama	35	27 May 1952	28 August 2008	Locomotora Copiapó
Coquimbo	52	28 November 1961	23 March 2011	Catedral de La Serena
Valparaíso	161 (Note: Includes the Colección Pictórica de la Presidencia de la República (Picture Collection of the Chilean Presidency), shared between the Valparaíso and Metropolitana de Santiago regions.)	25 January 1929	4 November 2011	Ex-Intendencia de Valparaíso
Metropolitana de Santiago	404	6 July 1951	19 March 2012	Palacio de La Moneda
Libertador General; Bernardo O'Higgins	67 (Note: Includes Predio Alto Huemul, shared between the O'Higgins and Maule regions.)	11 November 1954	27 January 2009	Centro Cultural Agustín Ross Edwards
Maule	54	26 July 1971	5 February 2010	Plaza de Armas de Curicó
Bío Bío	59	24 March 1926	23 April 2012	Fuerte Tucapel (re-construction)
La Araucanía	96	4 August 1986	3 August 2011	Viaducto de Malleco
Los Ríos	33	23 March 1926	25 November 2010	Canyons at Fuerte Niebla (Castillo de Niebla)
Los Lagos	64	24 March 1926	17 December 2010	Zona Típica de Puerto Varas
Aysén del General; Carlos Ibáñez del Campo	17	22 June 1994	6 August 2011	Zona Típica de Caleta Tortel
Magallanes y la Antártica Chilena	45	2 January 1968	1 June 2011	Cueva del Milodón
Total	1,269	23 March 1926	23 April 2012	
