= Enrique Simpson =

Chilean admiral (1835–1901)

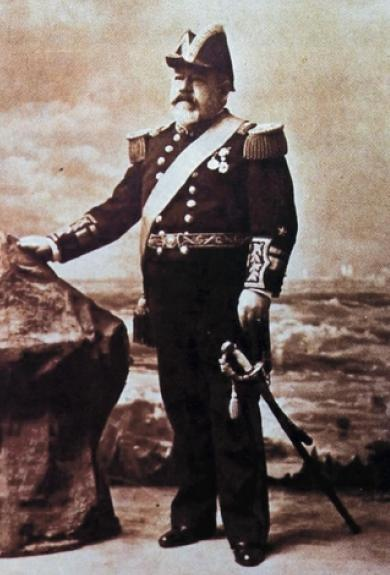
- Simpson during the 19th century
- Born: Enrique Simpson Baeza; 1835; Valparaíso, Chile
- Died: May 17, 1901 (aged 65–66); Valparaíso, Chile
- Father: Robert Winthrop Simpson
- Military career
- Allegiance: Chile
- Branch: Chilean Navy
- Service years: 1851–1898
- Rank: Counter admiral
- Commands: Chacabuco; Almirante Cochrane
- Conflict: Revolution of 1859: War of the Pacific; Battle of Pisagua
- Other work: Explorer

Enrique Simpson Baeza (1835, Valparaíso, Chile – 17 May 1901, Valparaíso, Chilean) was a Chilean naval officer and explorer. Simpson mapped the archipelagoes and coast of Aysén Region aboard of the corvette Chacabuco in the 1870s. Among his major achievements is the re-discovery of San Rafael Lake and the realization that Aisén Fjord provides the best access to the interior of Patagonia from the Pacific.

Simpson River is named after him.
