= Teniente Vidal Airfield =

Teniente Vidal Airport
- IATA: GXQ; ICAO: SCCY

Summary
- Airport type: Public
- Serves: Coyhaique, Chile
- Elevation AMSL: 1,020 ft / 311 m
- Coordinates: 45°35′40″S 72°06′24″W

Map
- Location of Teniente Vidal Airport in Chile

Runways
Direction	Length		Surface
Direction	m	ft	Surface
03/21	1,548	5,079	Asphalt
- Source: Landings.com Google Maps GCM

Teniente Vidal Airport (Spanish: Aeródromo Teniente Vidal, IATA: GXQ, ICAO: SCCY) is an airport serving Coyhaique, capital of the Aysén Region of Chile. The airport is 3 kilometres (1.9 mi) southwest of Coyhaique.

The runway has an additional 260 metres (850 ft) of unpaved overrun on the northeast end. There is a mountain nearby to the southeast, and rising terrain nearby northwest.

The Balmaceda VOR-DME (Ident: BAL) is located 25.3 nautical miles (46.9 km) southeast of the airport.

== See also ==
- Transport in Chile
- List of airports in Chile
