= Puerto Chacabuco =

Coordinates: 45°28′S 72°49′W

- Town
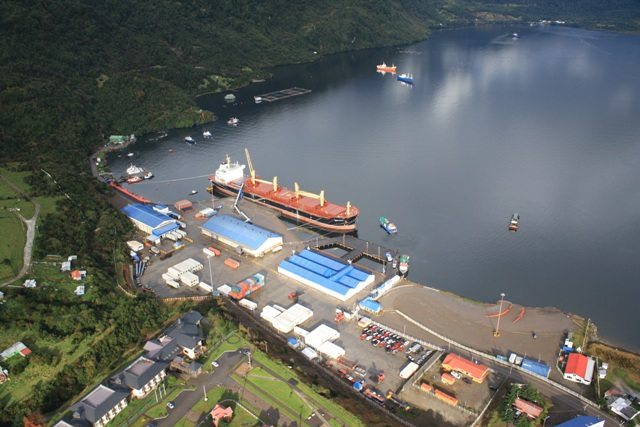

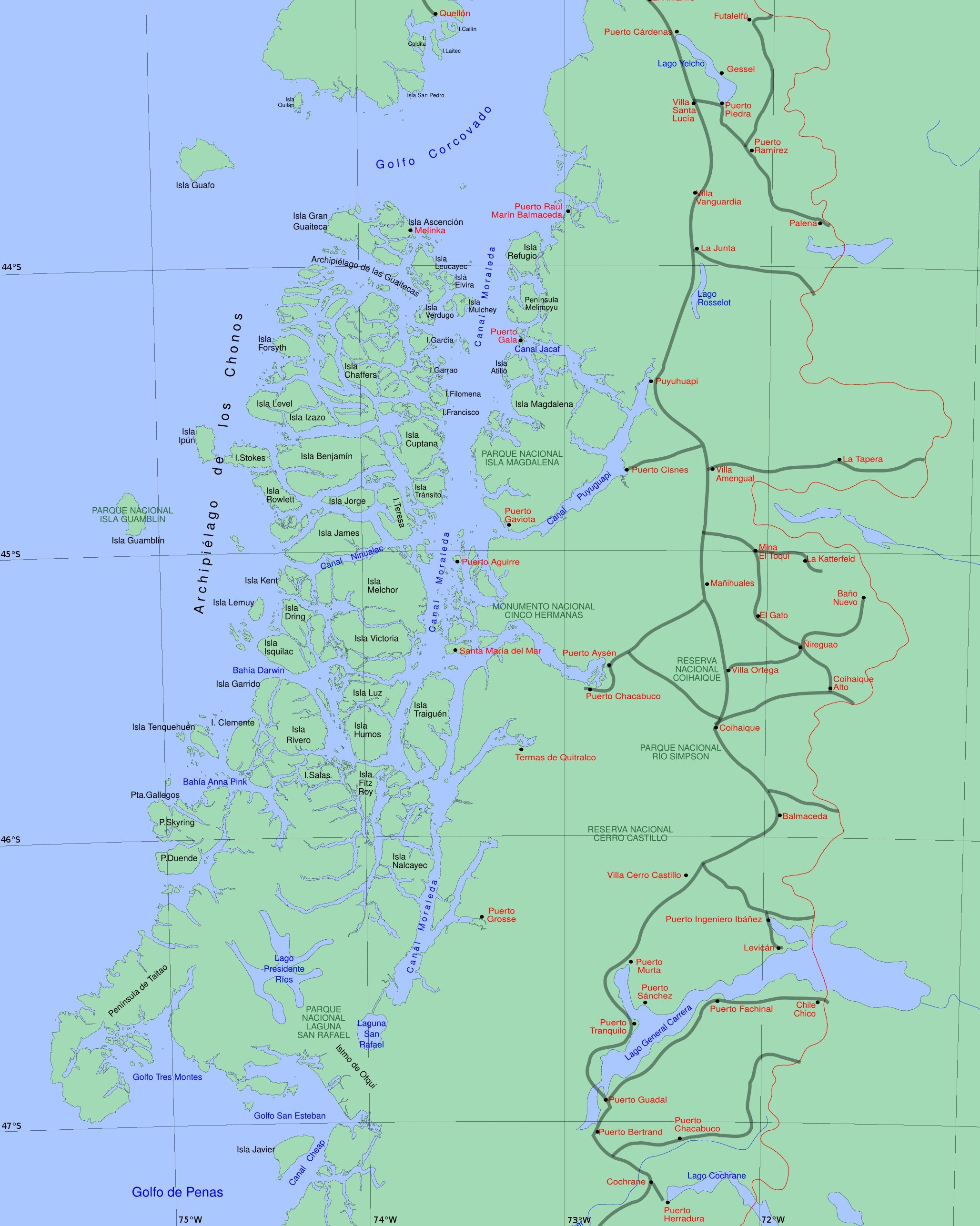
- Puerto Chacabuco, in the middle of the map
- Region: Aisén
- Province: Aisén
- Municipalidad: Aisén
- Comuna: Aisén

Government
  - Type: Municipalidad
  - Alcade: Óscar Catalán Sánchez

Population (2017)
  - Total: 1,239

Sex
  - Men: 619
  - Women: 620
- Time zone: UTC−04:00 (Chilean Standard)
  - Summer (DST): UTC−03:00 (Chilean Daylight)
- Area code: Country + town = 56 + ?
- Climate: Cfb

Puerto Chacabuco is a Chilean town in Aisén commune. Administratively it belongs to Aysén Province in Aysén del General Carlos Ibáñez del Campo Region and is located at the head of Aisén Fjord. It is the main port of the region, a port of call for ships sailing to the Laguna San Rafael National Park and the terminus of a Navimag ferry service from Puerto Montt. The town is the site of important fish and shellfish processing plants.

Puerto Chacabuco is named after the corvette Chacabuco with which Enrique Simpson explored the fjords and archipelagoes of Aysén Region in the 1870s. The ship is in turn named after the Battle of Chacabuco in 1817 during the Chilean Independence War.

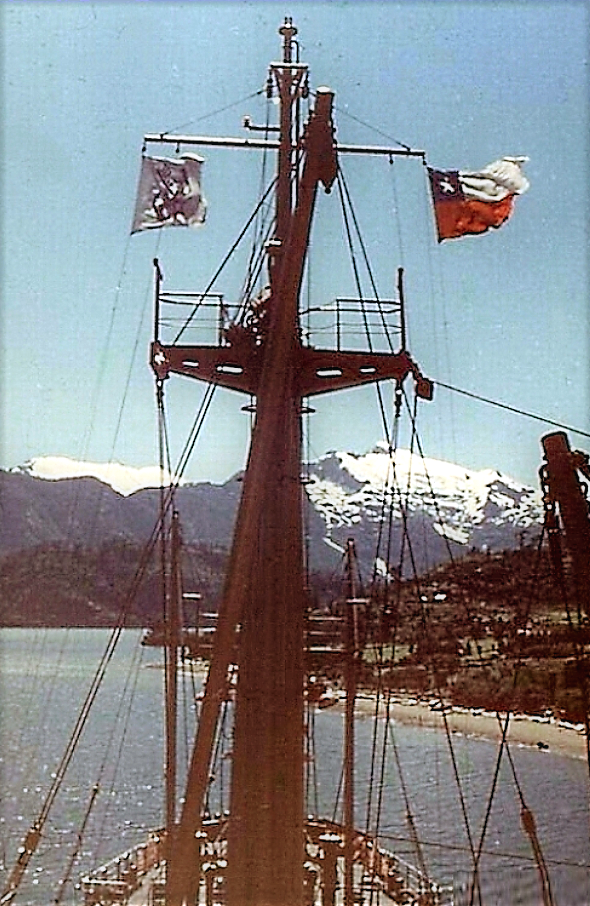
The cargo ship Lechstein NDL in Puerto Chacabuco - 1960

Before the great burnings of the Patagonian forests and the eruption of Mount Hudson volcano in 1991, Puerto Aisén was the main port in the Aisén Fjord, but the ashes and earth erosion decreased the navigability of Aisén River and the port had to be moved further to the coast where Puerto Chacabuco now stands.

From the 1990s up to August 2003 there were plans for building an aluminium smelter in the town.

An electric tug with 3.6 MWh battery (with diesel backup) started operating in 2025.

== See also ==
- Aquaculture in Chile
