= Aisén Fjord =

Fjord in Chile

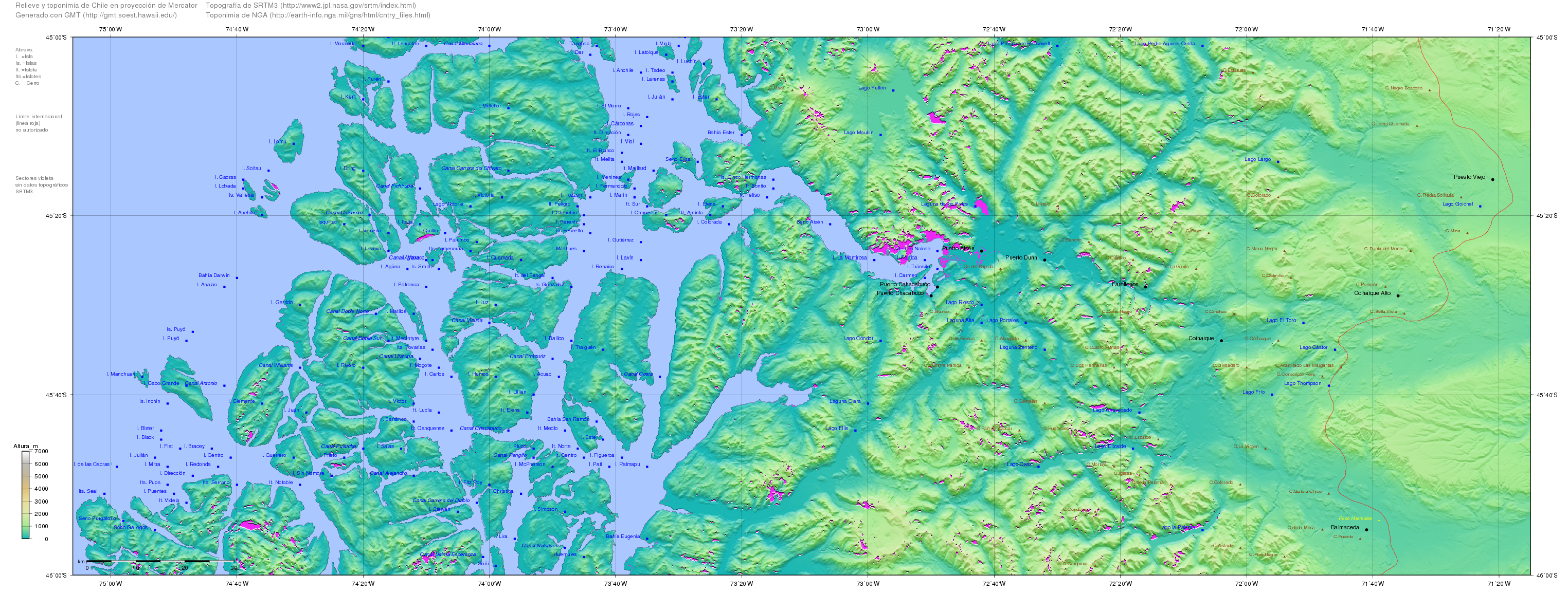

Aysén Fjord is an ~70 km long fjord stretching east from a skerry-guarded (skjærgård) region called Moraleda Channel (Spanish: Canal Moraleda), which is a body of water separating the Chonos Archipelago from the mainland of Chile. It is located at 45.26°S 73.00°W and is connected indirectly to the open coast of the Pacific Ocean via the Darwin Channel. The Aysén River discharges at the head of Aysén Fjord.

Puerto Chacabuco is situated by the shores at the head of this fjord. Puerto Aysén lies on the Aysén River approximately 4 km above the head of Aysén Fjord. It serves as the capital for the Aysén Province.

The region is heavily influenced by a wide tidal reach (up to 8 meters). It lies near the West Wind Drift, a major oceanic surface current which encounters the west coast of Chile at 41° S latitude. The West Wind Drift splits into the northward flowing branch which meets the Humboldt Current and the southward flowing Cape Horn Current, providing ample heat to drive vaporization of the sea water, which results in onshore precipitation of 4,000 – 7,000 mm per year in the Chilean Andes. The moisture is driven onshore by prevailing westerly winds, the Roaring Forties.

The fjord was explored by Enrique Simpson in 1870 in the Chacabuco who discovering its usfullness to access more inland locations.

From the 1990s up to August 2003 there were plans for building an aluminium smelter in the Puerto Chacabuco at the fjord's head. The project was opposed by salmon farm companies operating in the fjord for the water pollution they claimed the smelter would produce.

Between January 22 and April 22, 2007, the area around the fjord experienced a series of minor earthquakes.
