= Coyhaique Province =

Province in Aysén, Chile

Coyhaique Province Provincia de Coyhaique
- Province
- Seal Location in the Aysén del General Carlos Ibáñez del Campo Region Location in Chile
- Coordinates: 45°00′S 72°00′W
- Country: Chile
- Region: Aysén
- Capital: Coyhaique
- Communes: Coyhaique; Lago Verde

Government
  - Type: Provincial

Area
  - Total: 12,942.5 km^{2} (4,997.1 sq mi)

Population (2024 Census)
  - Total: 58,602
  - Density: 4.5279/km^{2} (11.727/sq mi)
- Time zone: UTC−4 (CLT)
  - Summer (DST): UTC-3 (CLST)
- Website: www.gobernacioncoihaique.gov.cl

Coyhaique Province (Spanish: Provincia de Coyhaique) is a province in the Aysén Region of Chile. Its capital is Coyhaique. Spread over an area of 12,942.5 km^{2} (4,997.1 sq mi), it had a population of 58,602 inhabitants as per the 2024 Chilean census. The province was established by law on 14 July 1974.

== History ==
The region was populated by several indigenous groups such as the Tehuelche, Alacalufe and Chono, who were nomadic, and used the streams for transportation along the Andes mountain. As the Spanish colonialists arrived inteh region, the indigenous population declined. It was repopulated only in the 19th century, when forests were cleared to establish cattle ranches.

The Aysén Region was established on 10 July 1974, as per Law No. 575, which reorganised Chile into thirteen regions. It was named is divided into four provinces–Coyhaique, Aysén, General Carrera and Capitán Prat, which are further divided into ten communes.

The name Coyhaique or Coihaique originated from the Tehuelche language words "koi" meaning "pond" and "aiken" meaning "camp", roughly translating to a "place with ponds or lagoons".

== Geography ==
Coyhaique Province is one of the four provinces of the Aysén Region in Chile. It spans an area of 12,942.5 km^{2} (4,997.1 sq mi). The province is situated in Chilean Patagonia, east of the Andes mountain range. Coyhaique, which lies at the confluence of the Simpson and Coyhaique rivers, serves as the capital of the region. About 55.7% of the land area of the province belongs to the Aysen River basin.

=== Climate ===
The province has a maritime coastal climate towards the west and cold climate towards the eastern border with Argentina. The temperatures are mild with an average annual temperature of 9.13 °C (48.43 °F), and drops below freezing in the winter. The region receives only about 3.35 cm (1.32 in) rainfall on average annually.

== Administration ==
Coyhaique is a second-level administrative division of Chile, governed by a governor. It is further sub-divided into two communes (comunas), Coyhaique and Lago Verde,

== Demographics ==
According to the 2024 Chilean census, the Coyhaique province had a population of 58,602 inhabitants, and is the most populous of the provinces in the Aysen region. The population consisted of 30,005 females (51.2%) and 28,597 males (48.8%). About 19.3% of the population was below the age of 15 years, 68.2% belonged to the age group of 15–64 years, and 12.5% was aged 65 years or older. The province had an urban population of 46,854 inhabitants (80%) and a rural population of 11,748 inhabitants (20%). Most of the residents were born in Chile, accounting for 56,097 inhabitants (95.7%). Non-indigenous people formed the majority of the population with 43,512 inhabitants (74.3%), while 15,073 inhabitants (25.7%) identified themselves as belonging to indigenous groups. Roman Catholics formed the largest religious group with 24,208 adherents (51.5%), followed by 14,858 inhabitants (31.6%) indicating no religious affiliation, and Evangelicals or Protestants with 6,752 adherents (14.4%).
