= Los Domos =

Gold mining project in Chile

Coordinates: 46°44′0.22″S 71°45′13.46″W

Los Domos is a gold mine project in Aysén Region, Chile. The company Southern Gold SpA has been exploring the area since the late 2010s. In 2019 a consultant of Southern Gold SpA declared to the inhabitants of the nearby town of Chile Chico that prospecting was expected to last four years, employ 35 people and involve a total of 85 exploration drilling sites. In February 2023 an enquiry was launched by the Superintendency of the Environment about whether to sanction or not Southern Gold SpA for breaching the deadline for registering its works in the national environmental impact assessment system. The project site lies close to Patagonia National Park.
