= National monuments of Chile =

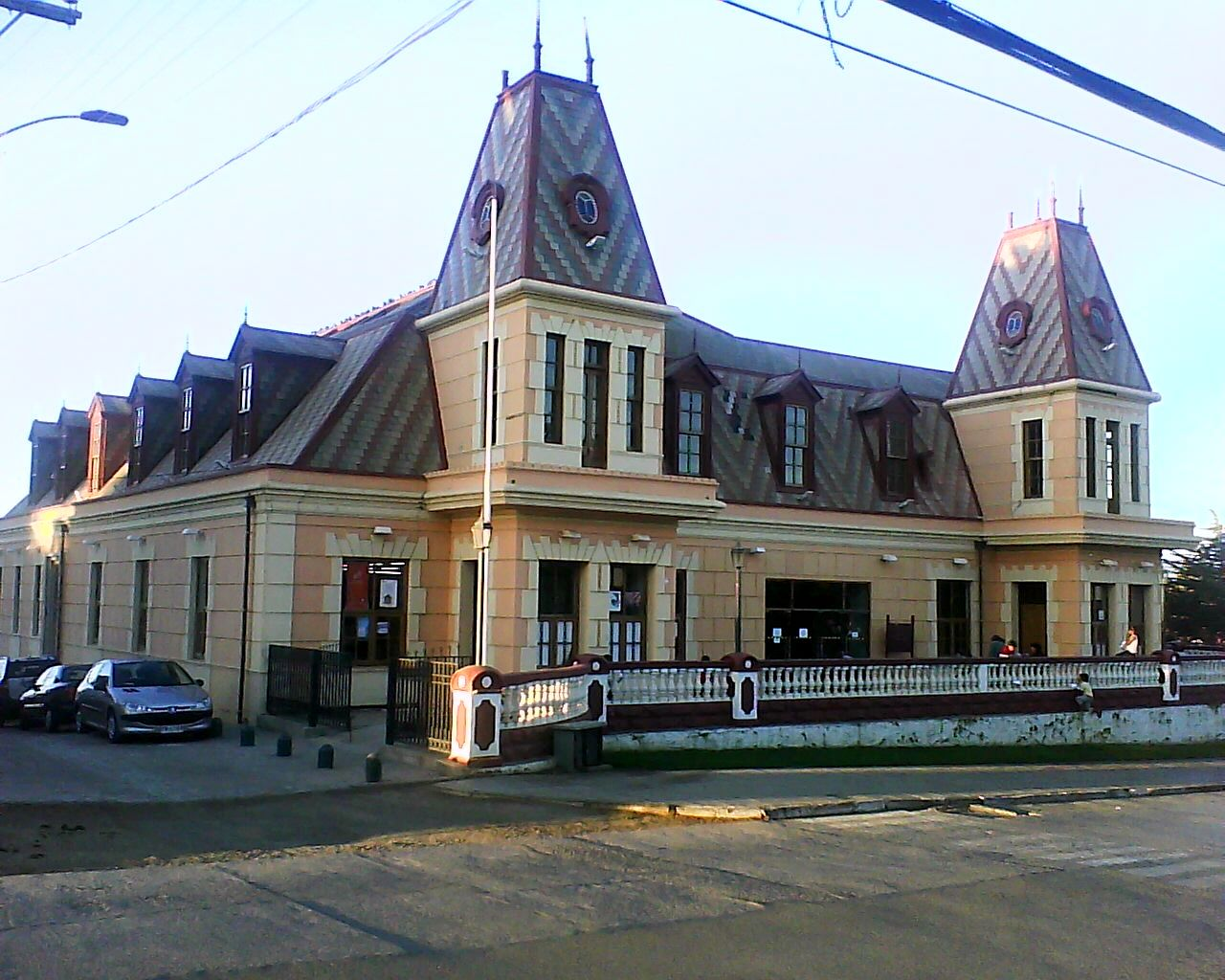
Agustín Ross Cultural Centre, a historic monument in Pichilemu

The National Monuments of Chile (Spanish: Monumentos Nacionales de Chile [MN]) are those places and properties, moveable or fixed, protected by the State of Chile under the 1970 Law No. 17,288 for the protection of National Monuments. This protection is managed by the Council of National Monuments (Spanish: Consejo de Monumentos Nacionales [CMN]) owing to the historical, artistic, scientific or commemorative value of those properties designated as national monuments, which represent the country's cultural heritage.

There are five categories of national monuments:

- Historical monuments
- Typical (or picturesque) zones
- Nature preserves
- Archeological monuments
- Public monuments

== Definition and categories of national monuments ==
Law 17,288 concerning national monuments stipulates that national monuments include the following:

- Places, ruins, constructions or objects of historical or artistic character
- Burial sites or cemeteries or other remains of indigenous peoples
- Objects or works of anthropo-archaeological, paleontological or natural origin
  - Under or on the surface of the national territory or underwater within its jurisdictional waters
  - Whose conservation is of interest to history, art or science
  - Under the custody and protection of the State
- Nature preserves
- Monuments, statues, columns, pyramids, fountains, plaques, trophies, inscriptions and, in general, objects with a commemorative character that are destined to remain in a public place.

As of May 2024 there are over 1,857 national monuments. They are grouped into the following categories:

- Historic monuments (1,606)
- Typical (or picturesque) zones (149)
- Nature sanctuaries (102)
- Archaeological monuments (counts are not provided)
- Public monuments (counts are not provided).

=== Historic monuments ===
Historic monuments are defined by Chile's Law 17.288 of National Monuments as places ruins, constructions and objects formally declared by the council to be of interest due to their historic or artistic quality or interest, or due to their antiquity.

In the register of the National Monuments Council, there are 1,606 historic monuments as of May 2024. These include the following sites:

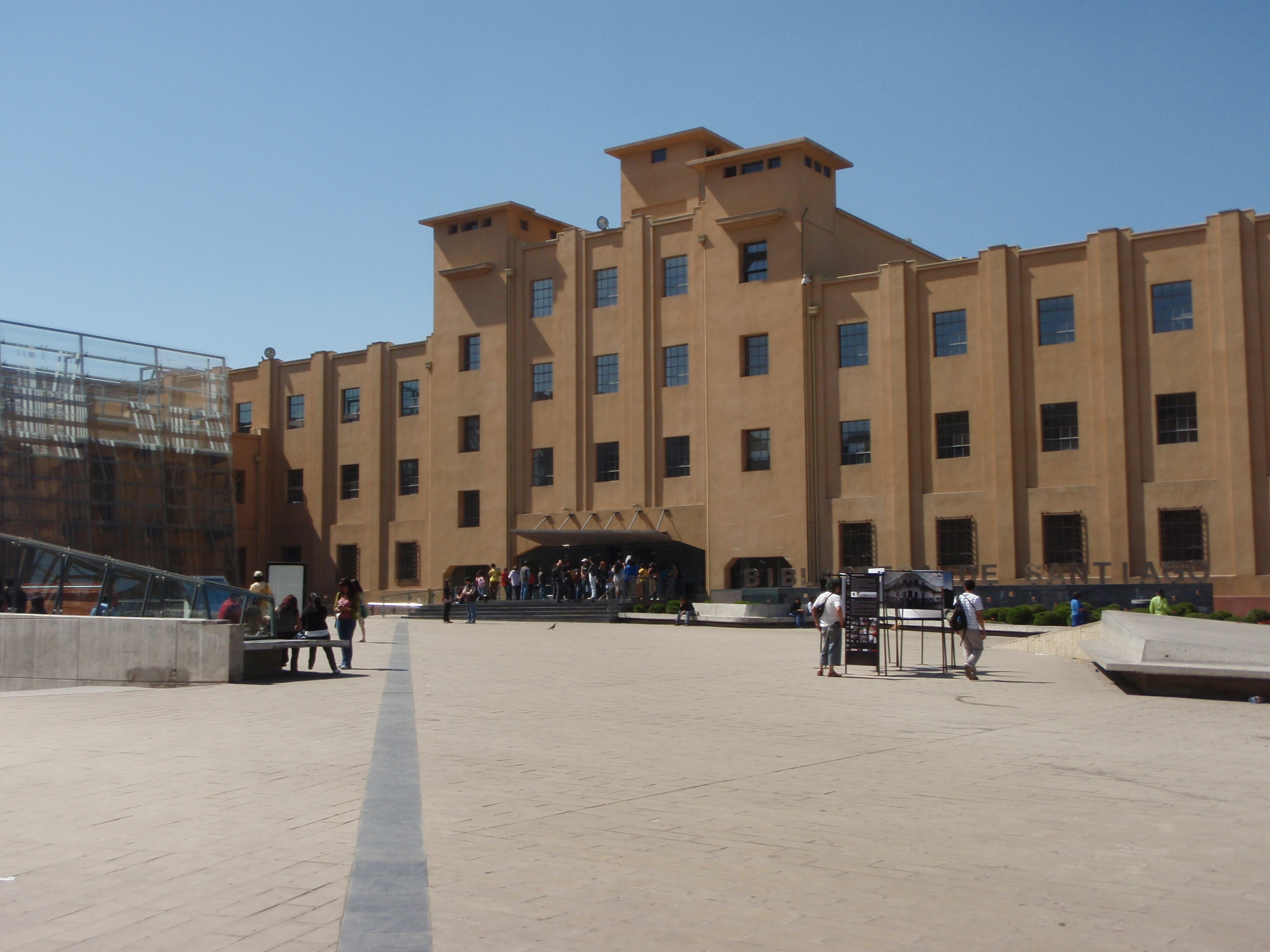
Biblioteca de Santiago (Library of Santiago) built 1928-1945. Formerly the State Procurement building.

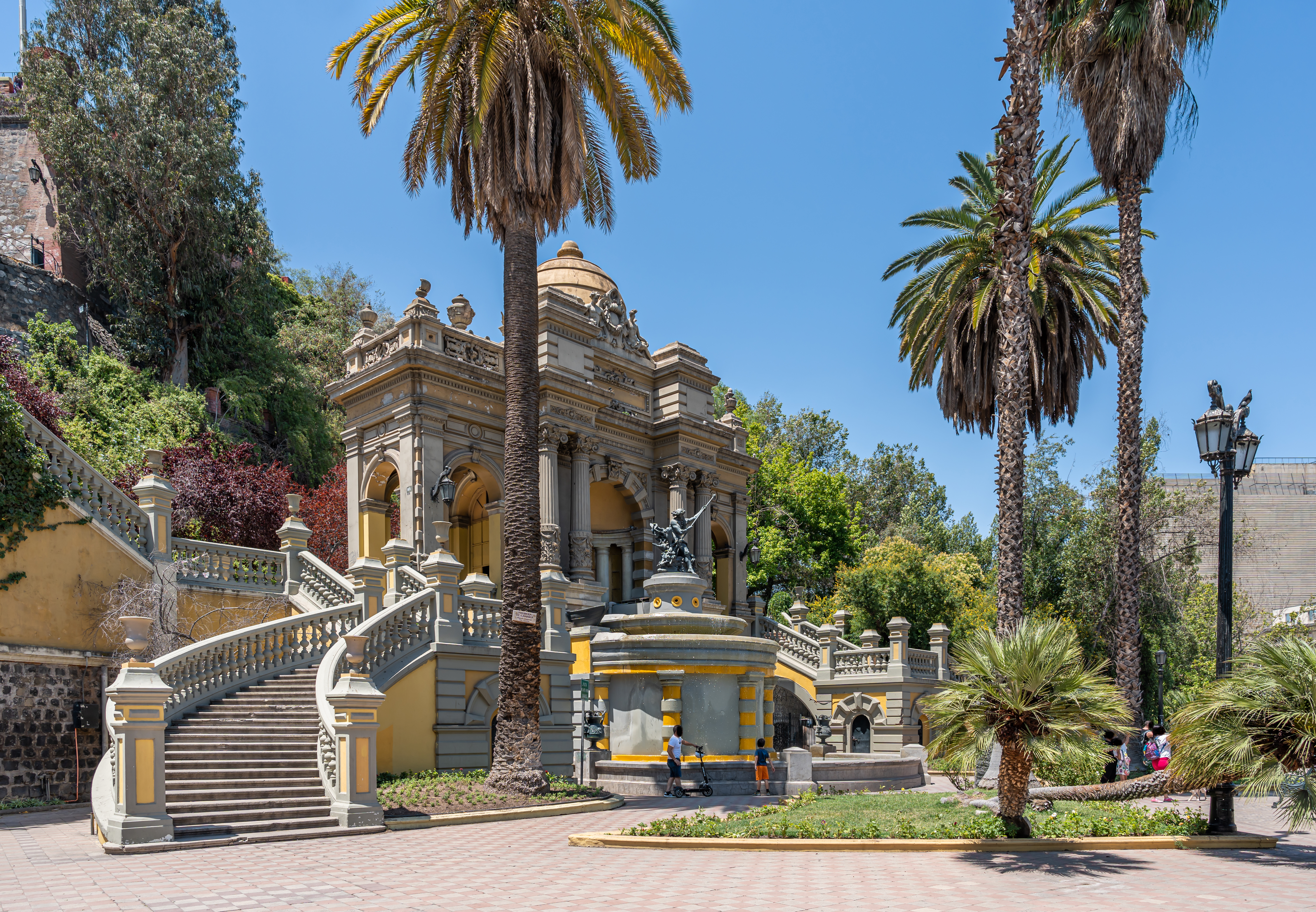
Side view of Santa Lucia Hill (Cerro de Santa Lucía). The site was significant to indigenous inhabitants before it was named for Santa Lucía in 1541.

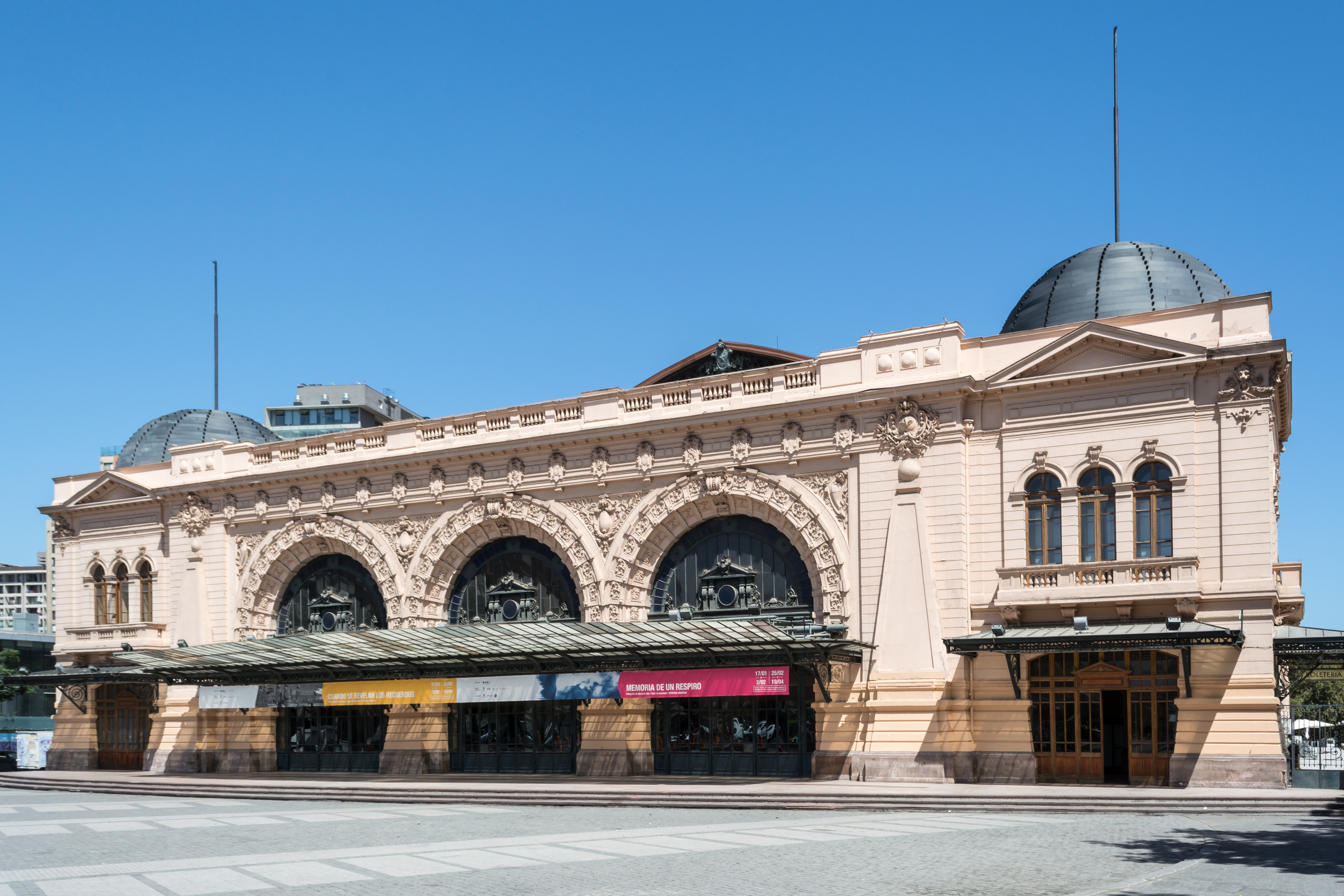
Mapocho Station Cultural Centre. Built in 1905, it was a train station until 1987.

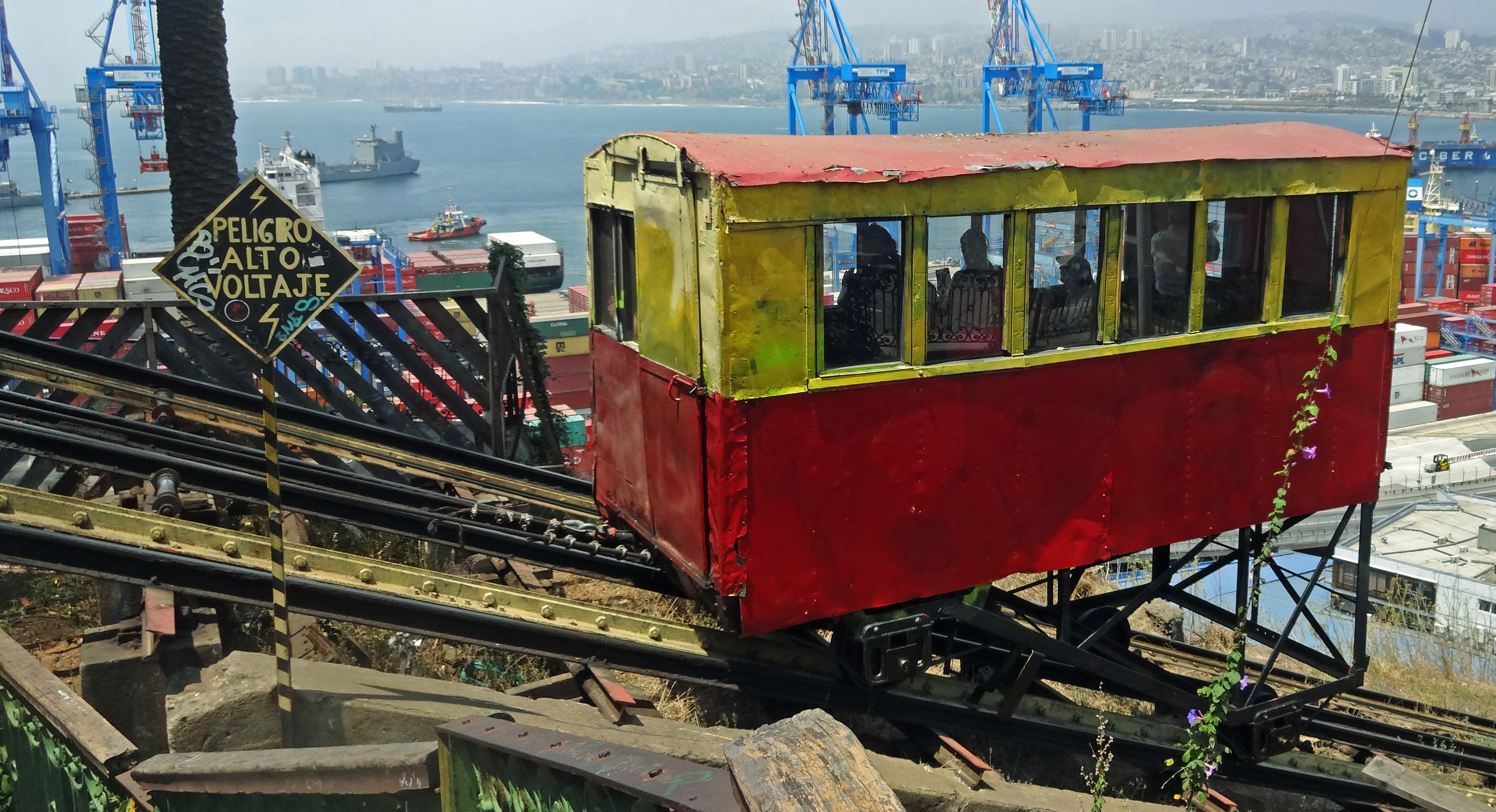
Funicular railways of Valparaiso. Most began operation in the early 1900s.

=== Typical or picturesque zones ===
Urban or rural properties that form a unit and are notable for their style, materiality or construction technique, or that contain historic or archeologic monuments, are designated as typical or picturesque zones by Chile's Law 17,288 of National Monuments.

In the register of the National Monuments Council, as of May 2024, there are 149 typical zones. These include:

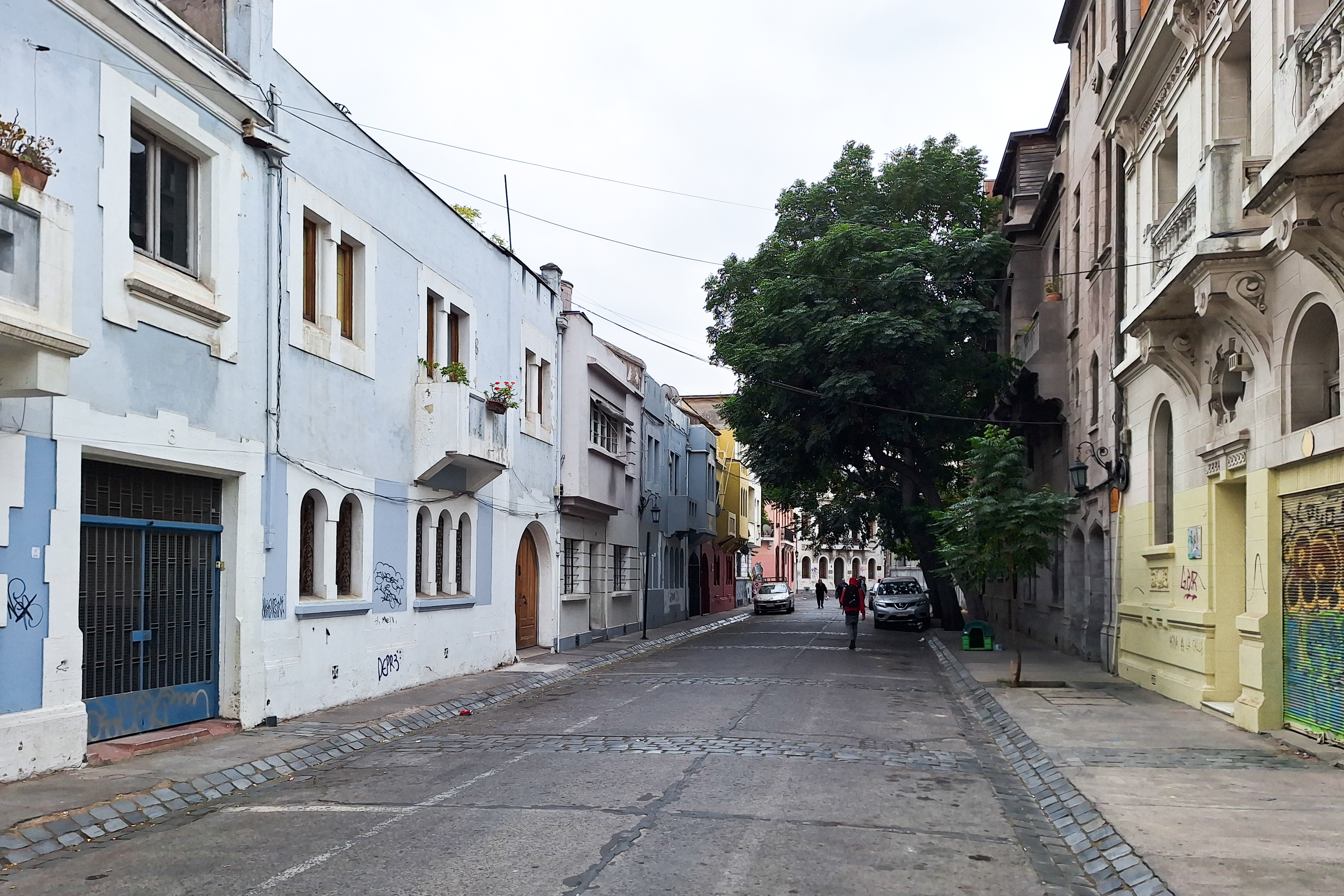
Concha y Toro neighborhood in Santiago, known for the medieval layout of its streets.

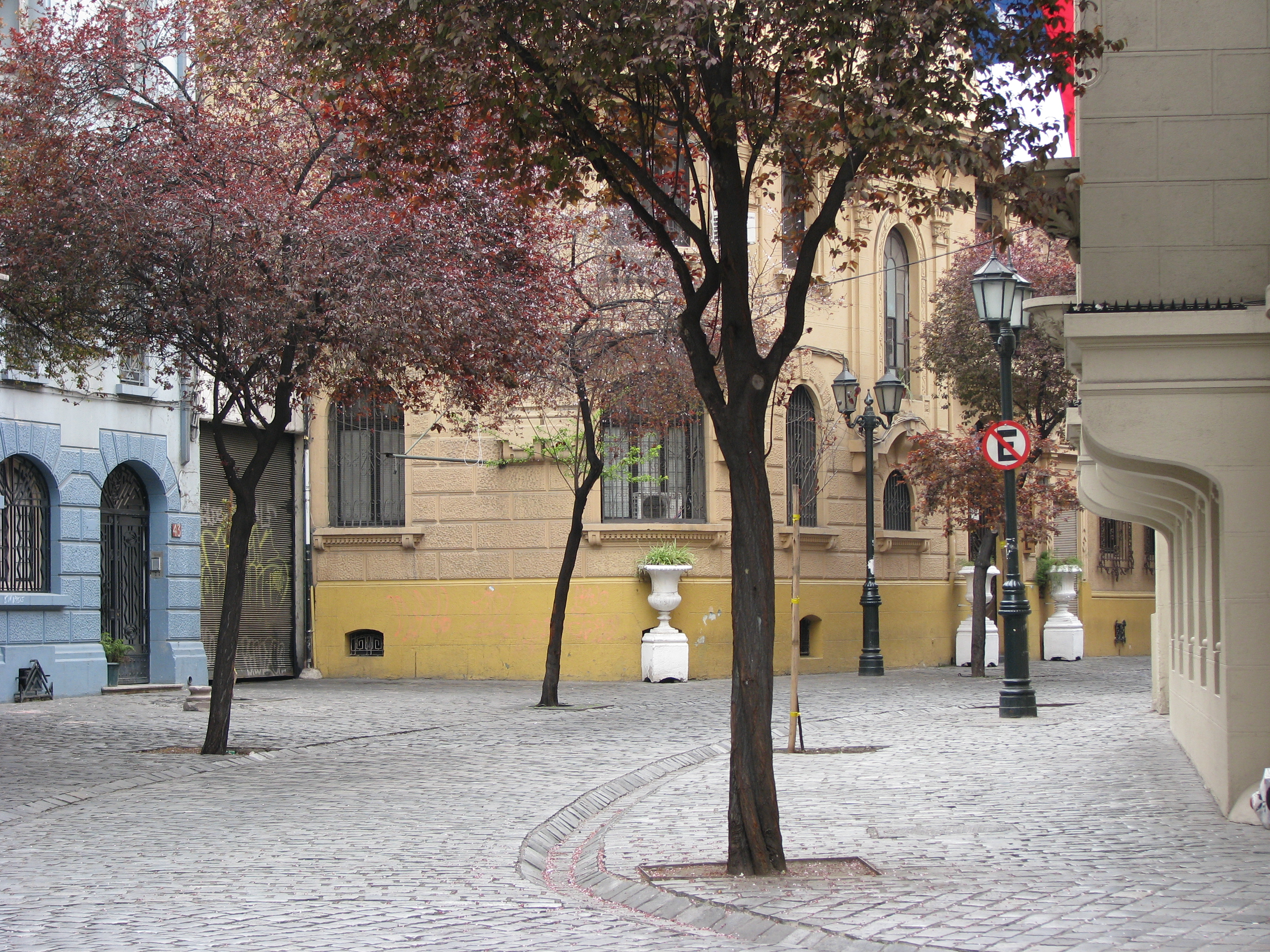
Paris-London neighborhood, known for European-influenced architecture.

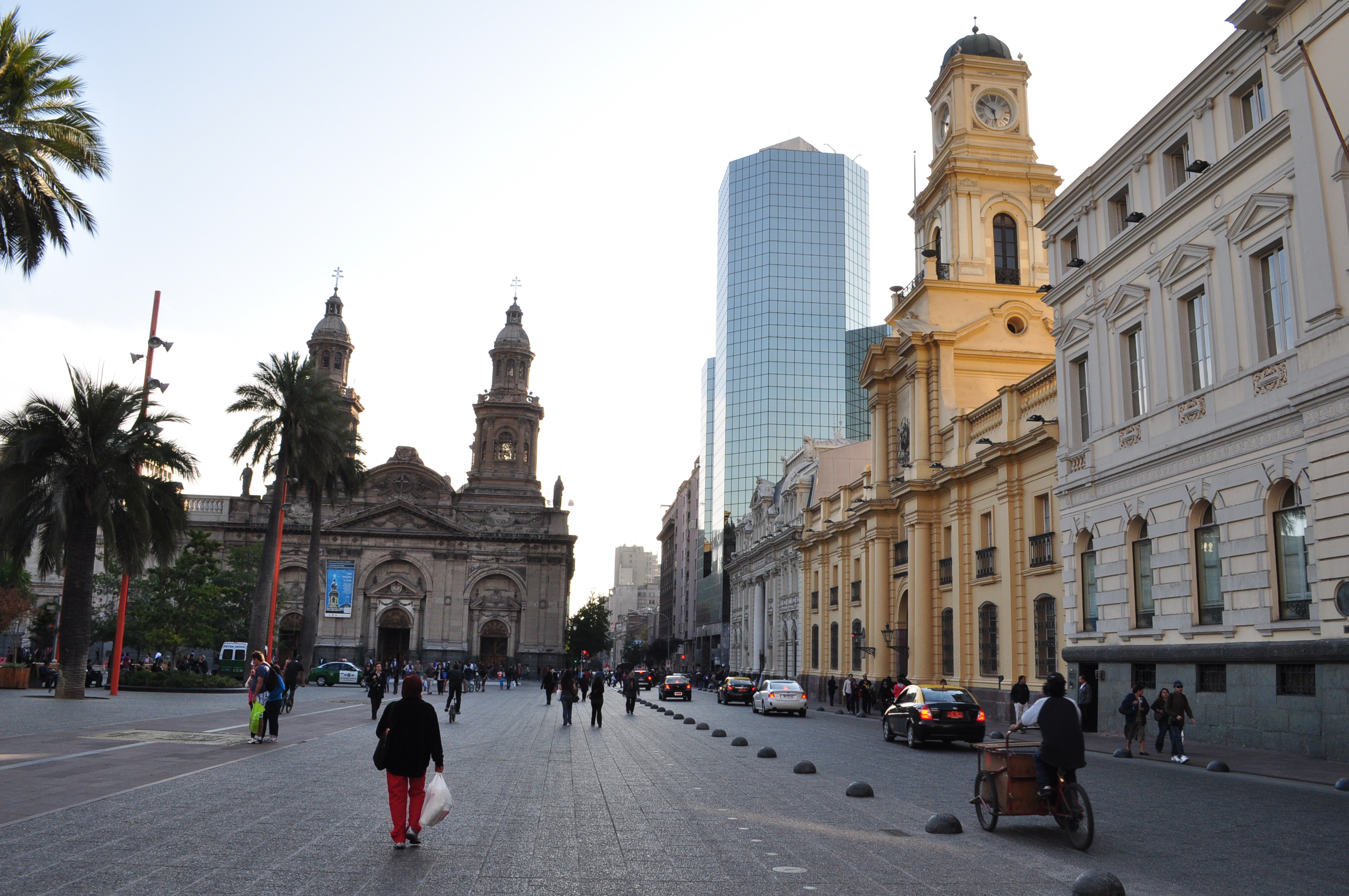
The area near the Plaza de Armas contains many 18th and 19th century monuments.

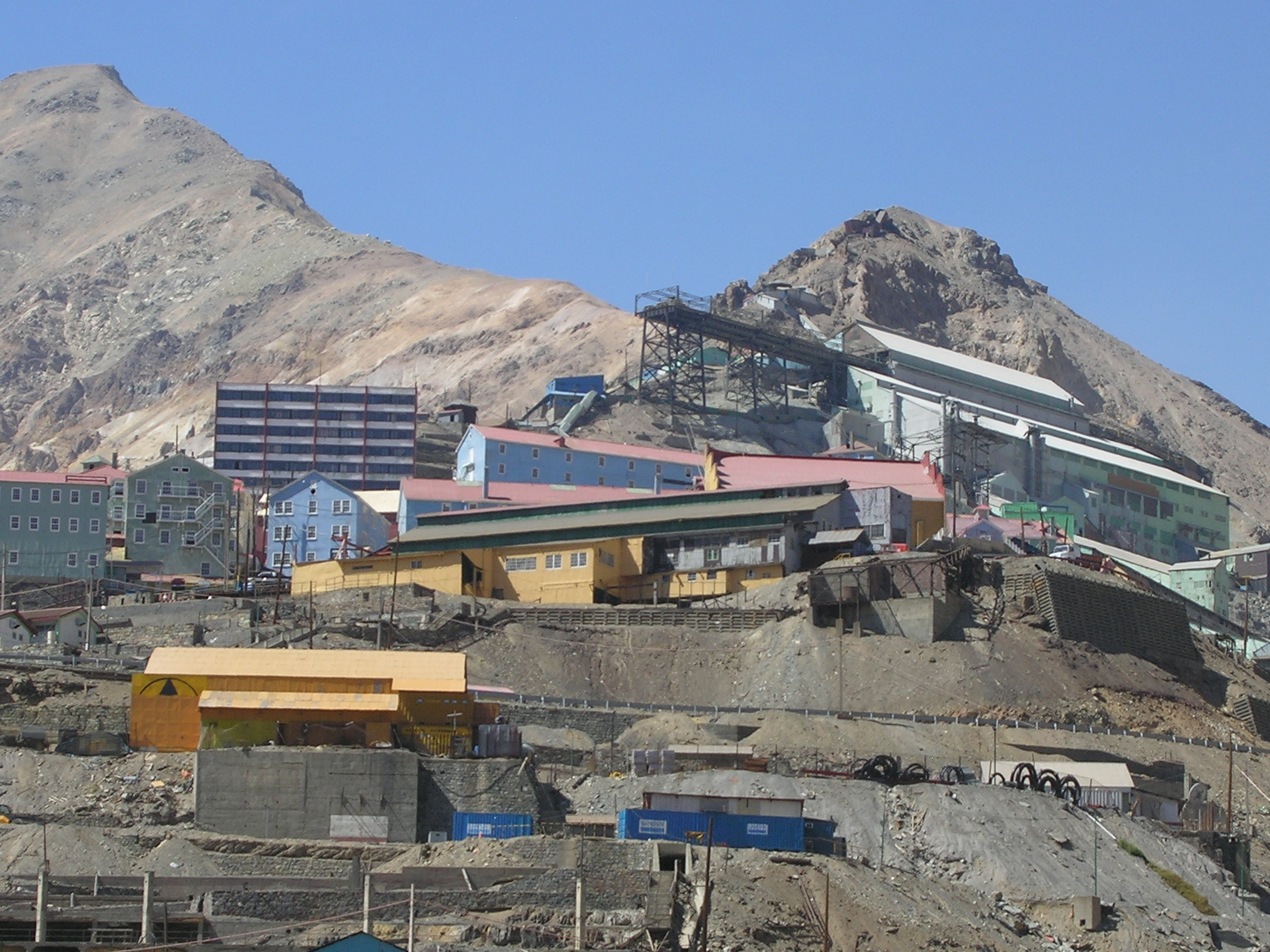
Sewell is an uninhabited mining town and a UNESCO World Heritage site.

=== Nature preserves ===
Article 31 of Chile's Law 17,288 of National Monuments deals with nature preserves and scientific research. It declares as nature preserves all terrestrial or marine sites whose conservation could be of interest for science or for the State, because the sites could offer special possibilities for research in geology, paleontology, zoology, botany or ecology, or due to their natural formations.

The examples that follow are some of the 102 nature preserves that have been designated.

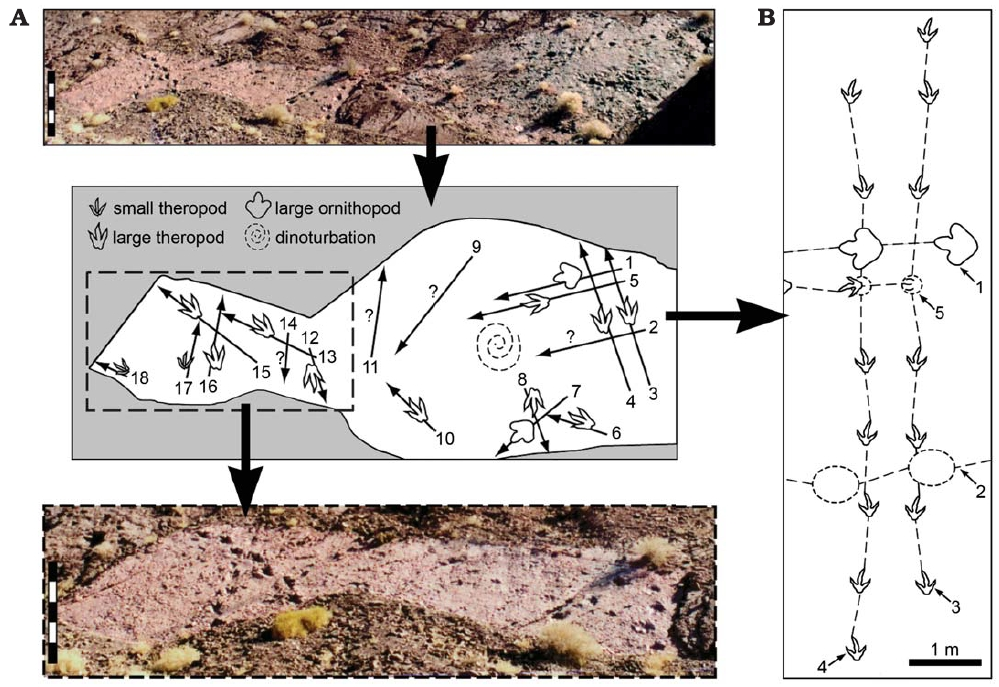
Chacarilla formation, a geologic site with dinosaur tracks.

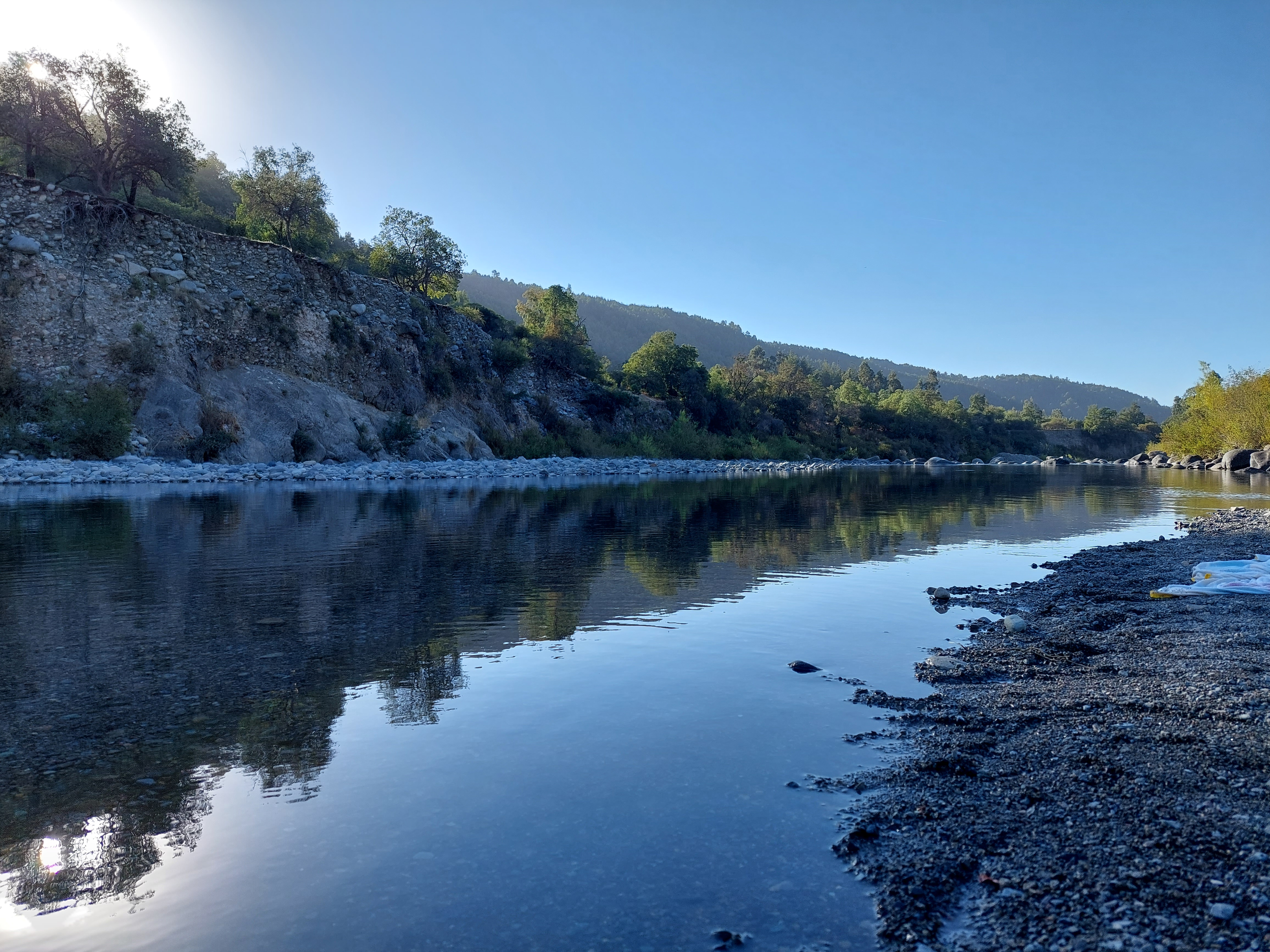
Maule region of the Canyon of the Achibueno River

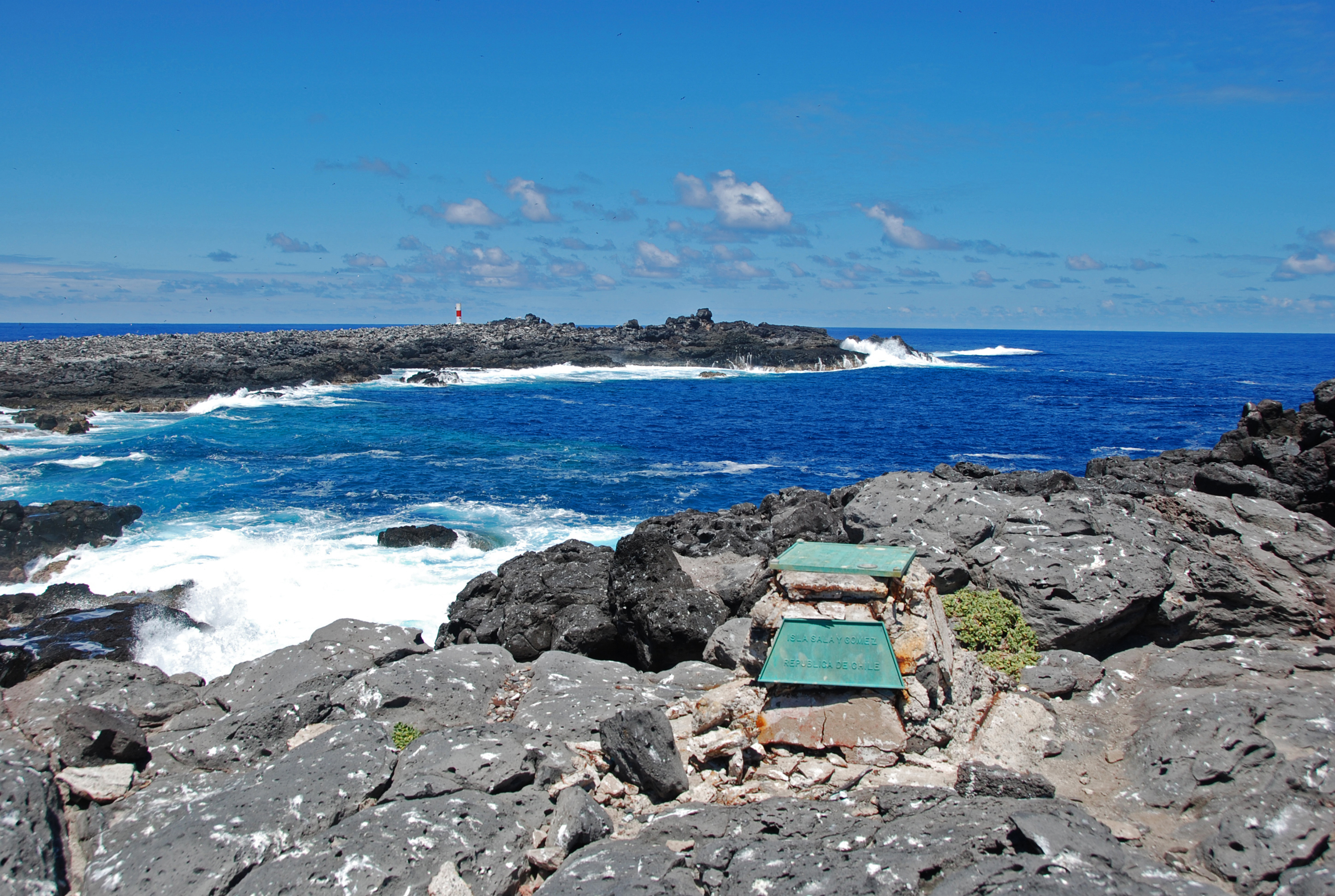
Salas y Gomez island, adjacent to Easter Island (Rapa Nui)

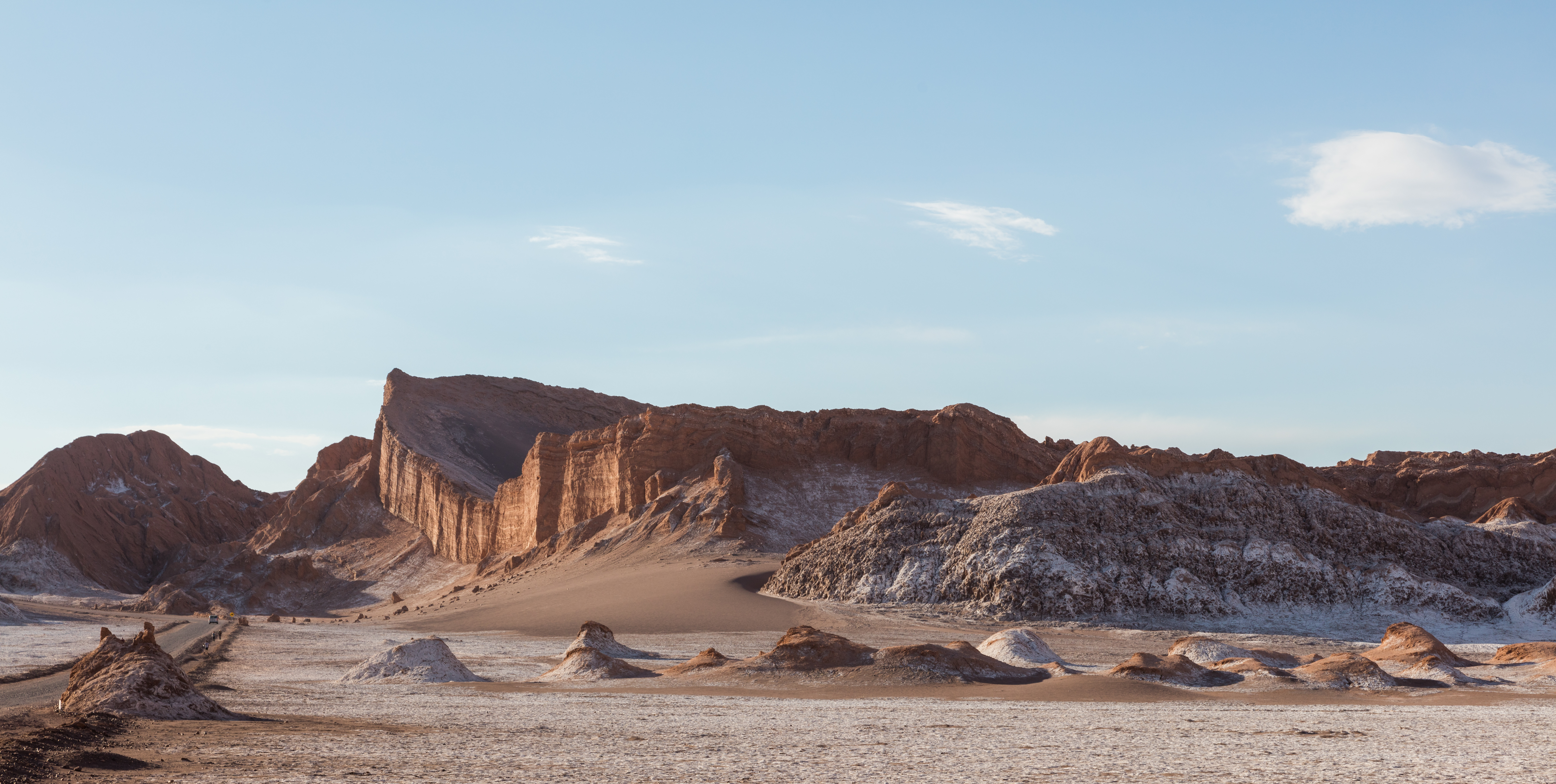
Amphitheater formation at the Valley of the Moon in the Atacama Desert

=== Public monuments ===
Law 17,288 defines public monuments as commemorative objects in public places. The National Monuments Council is trying to create a register in which all public monuments can be listed, using information from the local authorities.

=== Archaeological monuments ===
Article 21 of Law 17,288 designates places, ruins, and anthropo-archaeologic objects under or on the surface of the national territory as archaeological monuments.

Archaeological monuments include:

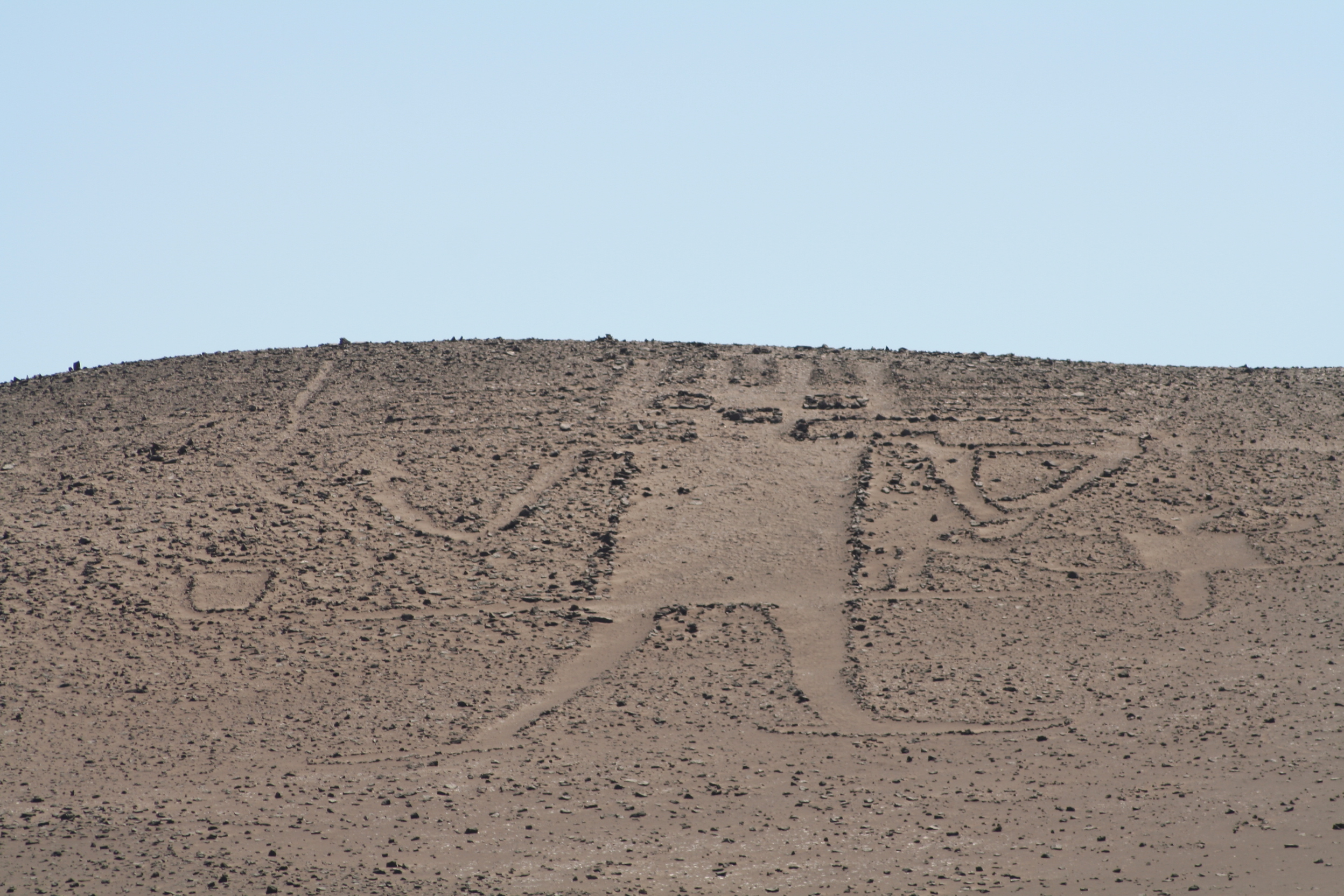
Geoglyph known as the Atacama Giant

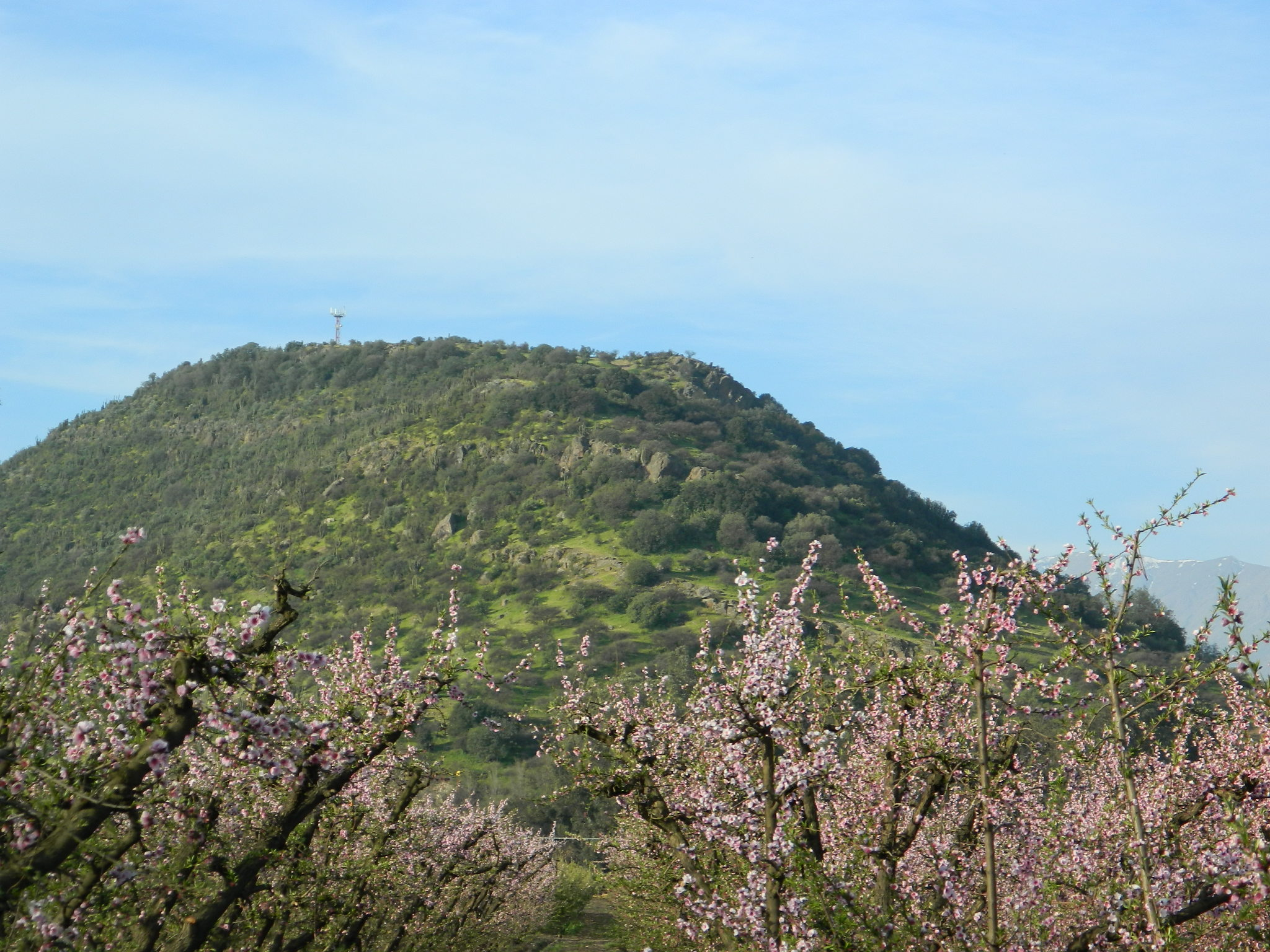
La Compañía fortress

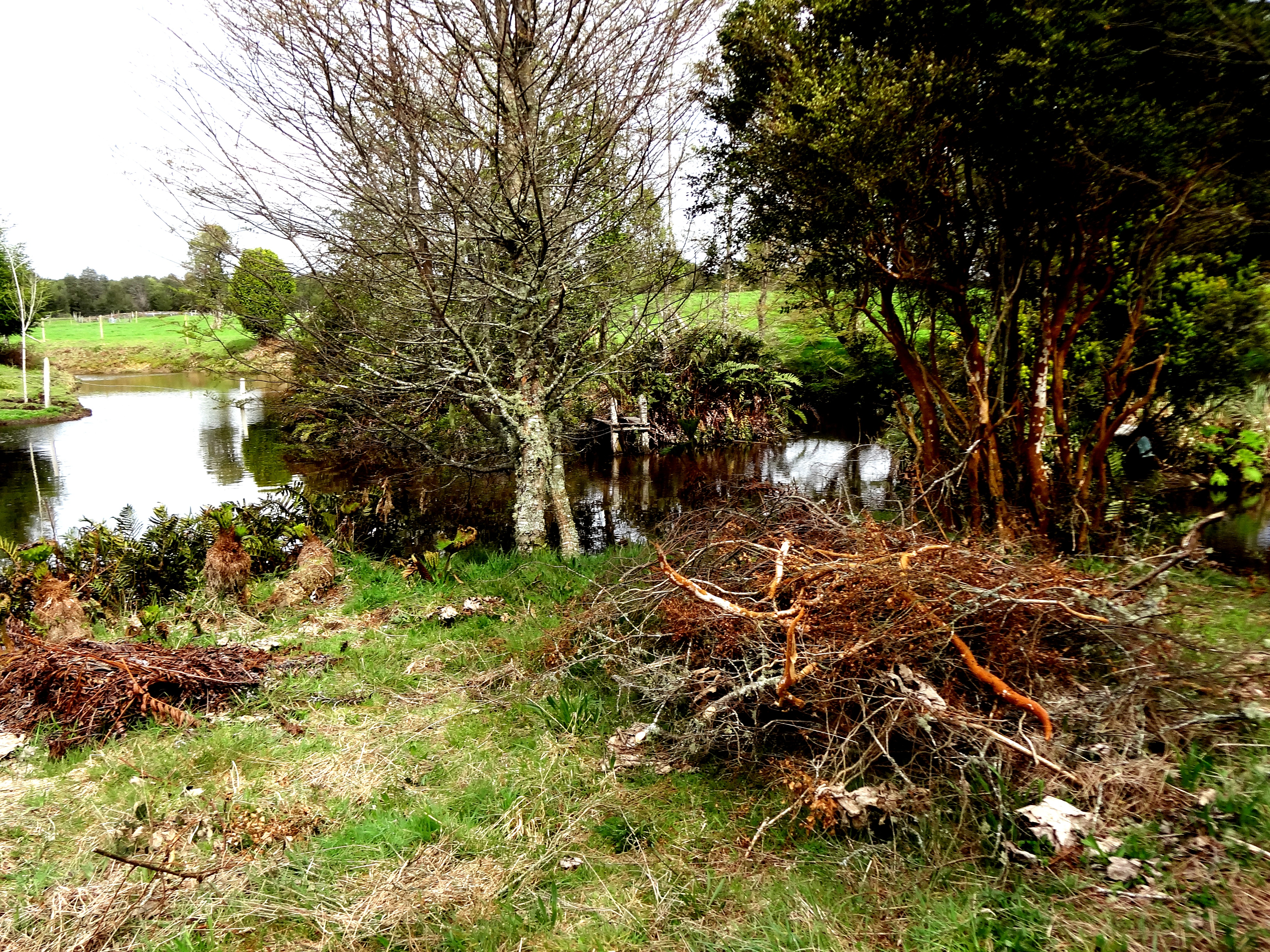
Monte Verde archelogical site, described as the most significant in South America.

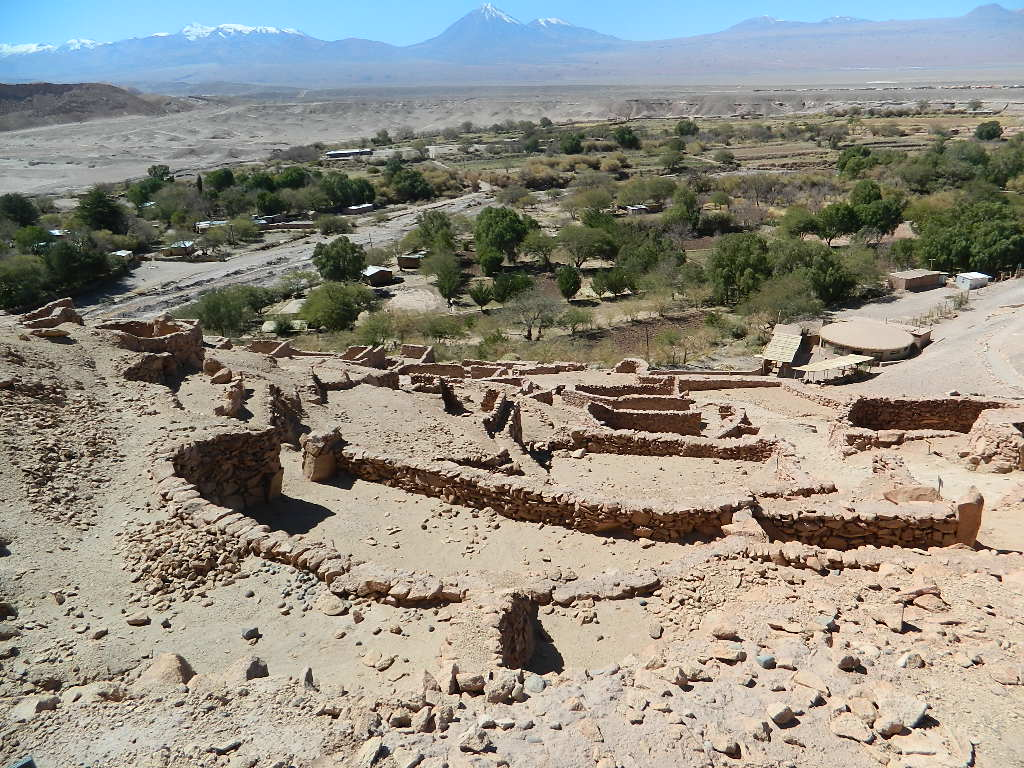
Fortress of Quitor

== See also ==
- List of National Monuments of Chile by region
