= Aysén River =

Coordinates: 45°24′30″S 72°48′00″W

Aisén River
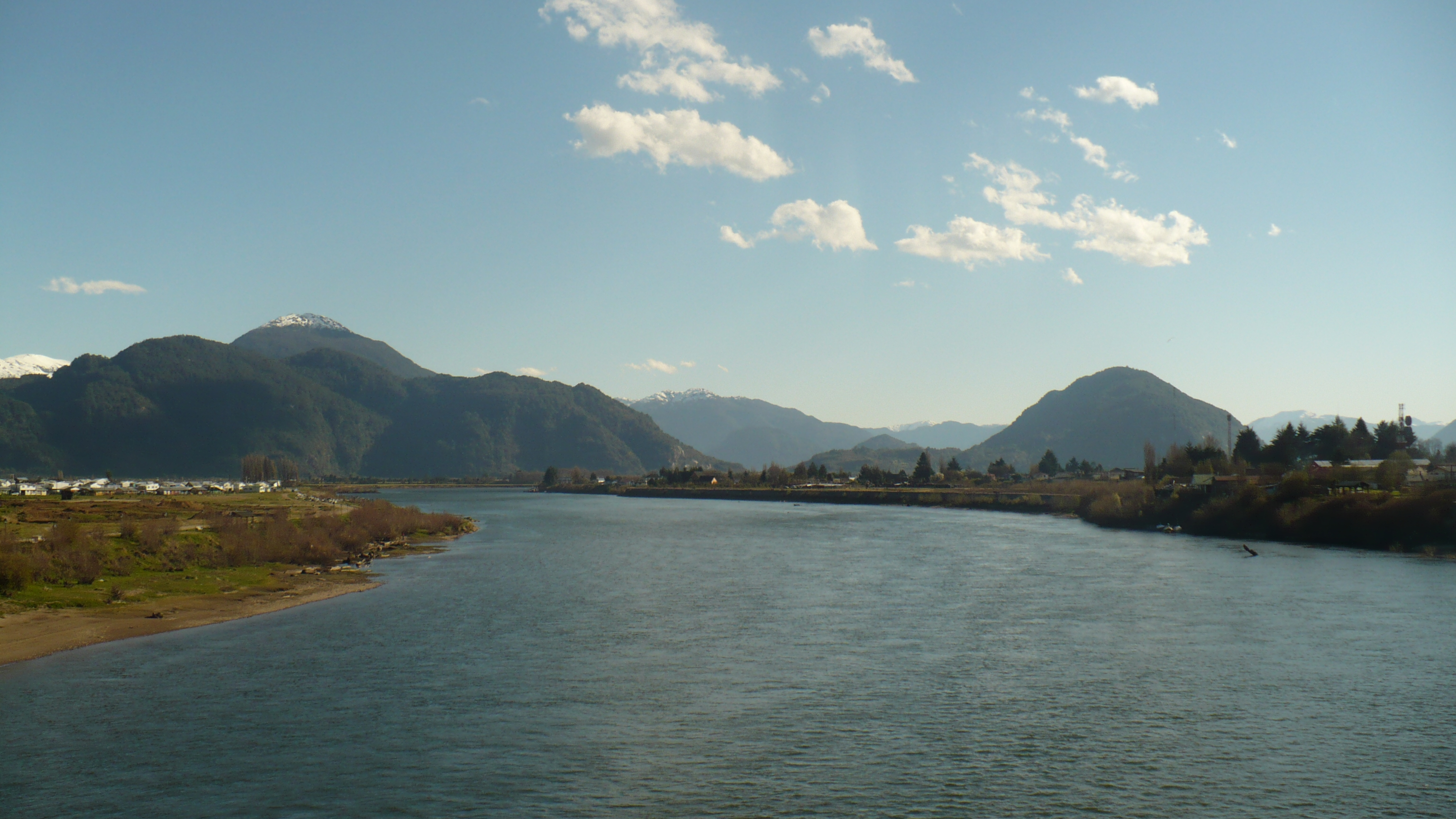

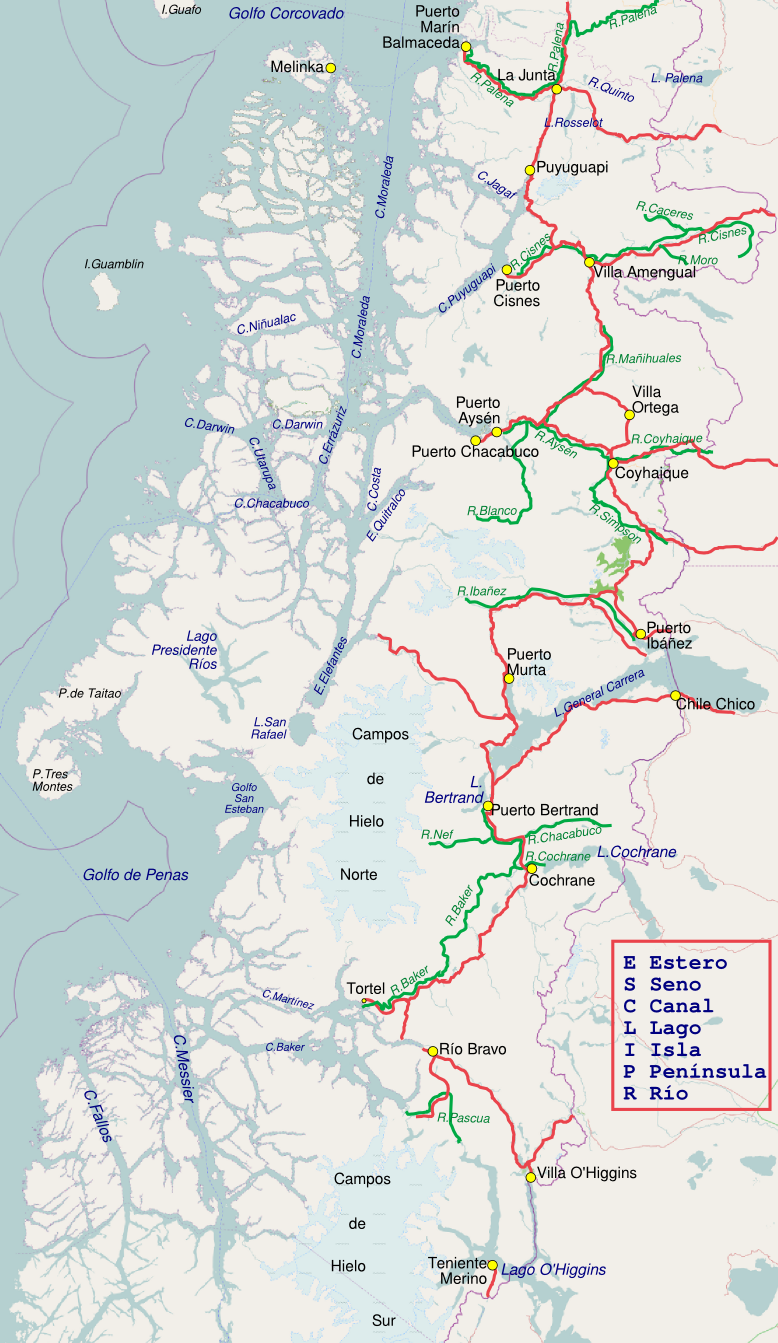
- Aysén River in the Aysén Region

Location
- Country: Chile

Physical characteristics
- Mouth
  - location: Aisén Fjord
- Length: 26 km (16 mi)
- Basin size: 11,427 km^{2} (4,412 sq mi)

Aisén River, also spelled Aysén, is a river of Chile located in the Aysén del General Carlos Ibáñez del Campo Region. The Aisén begins at the confluence of the Simpson River and the Mañiguales River.

Puerto Aisén is located close to its mouth.
