= List of lakes of Chile =

The following is a list of lakes in Chile. It consists of lakes of varying types and origins but the majority of the lakes (especially those in southern Chile) are glacial in origin. The watershed or catchment area is the geographical area of land that drains into the lake.

== Lakes by area ==
Note: The lakes are ordered by their area within the political boundaries of Chile. Dams and reservoirs are not included.

Lakes with an area of more than 30 km^{2}
Name	Area in Chile (km^{2})	Total area (km^{2})	Max. depth (m)
General Carrera	970	1850	586
Llanquihue	871	871	317
O'Higgins	554	1013	836
Ranco	442	442	199
Presidente Ríos	352	352	N/D
Greve	240	240	150
Rupanco	235	235	274
del Toro	202	202	320
Todos los Santos	178.5	178.5	337
Villarrica	176	176	165
Cochrane	175.25	325	460
Puyehue	165.4	165.4	123
del Laja	128.1	128.1	135
San Rafael	123	123	140
Panguipulli	117	117	268
Yelcho	116	116	238
Calafquén	114.9	114.9	212
Sarmiento	86.2	86.2	312
Riñihue	77.5	77.5	323
Yulton	62	62	N/D
Colico	54.96	54.96	374
Caburgua	52.27	52.27	327
Palena	51	135	300
Maihue	47.2	47.2	207
Chapo	45.3	45.3	298
Cami	39	645	449
Grey	38.6	38.6	410
Lanalhue	32.05	32.05	24
Pirihueico	30.4	30.4	145

== Lakes by natural region ==
=== Lakes in Norte Grande ===
- Chungará Lake
- Cotacota Lagoons
- Laguna de Cotacotani
- Laguna Lejía
- Quantija Lagoon
- Miscanti Lagoon

=== Lakes in Norte Chico ===
- Conchucha Lagoon
- Embalse Corrales (man-made)
- Laguna Verde
- Tranque Puclaro (man-made)

=== Lakes in Zona Central ===
- Colbún Lake (man-made)
- Laguna del Inca
- Laguna del Laja
- Peñuelas Lake (man-made)
- Rapel Lake (man-made)

=== Lakes in Zona Sur ===

- Budi Lake
- Caburgua Lake
- Calafquén Lake
- Chapo Lake
- Colico Lake
- Conguillio Lake
- Constancia Lake
- del Las Rocas Lake
- Galletué Lake
- Gris Lake
- Huilipilún Lake
- Huishue Lake
- Icalma Lake
- Lanalhue Lake
- Llanquihue Lake
- Lleulleu Lake
- Maihue Lake
- Neltume Lake
- Laguna Verde
- Panguipulli Lake
- Pellaifa Lake
- Pirihueico Lake
- Pullinque Lake
- Puyehue Lake
- Riñihue Lake
- Ranco Lake
- Rupanco Lake
- Tagua Tagua Lake
- Tinquilco Lake
- Todos los Santos Lake
- Villarrica Lake

=== Lakes in Zona Austral ===
- Azul Lake
- Blanco Lake
- Chaiguata Lake
- Caro Lake
- Chico Lake
- Cochrane Lake (in Chile and Argentina)
- Copa Lake
- Cucao Lake
- Del Toro Lake
- Dickson Lake
- El Parrillar Lake
- Espolón Lake
- Fagnano Lake (in Chile and Argentina)
- Geike Lake
- General Carrera Lake (in Chile and Argentina)
- Greve Lake
- Grey Lake
- La Paloma Lake
- Laguna Blanca (Chile)
- Laguna Abascal
- Laguna San Rafael
- Laguna Verde
- Navarino Lake
- Nordenskiöld Lake
- O'Higgins Lake (in Chile and Argentina)
- Palena Lake (in Chile and Argentina)
- Pehoe Lake
- Pilushejan Lake
- Pingo Lake
- Presidente Rios Lake
- Reñihue Lake
- Roosevelt Lake
- Sarmiento Lake
- Windhond Lake
- Yelcho Lake
- Yulton Lake

== See also ==
- List of lakes
- List of rivers of Chile
- List of volcanoes in Chile
