= Environmental issues in Chile =

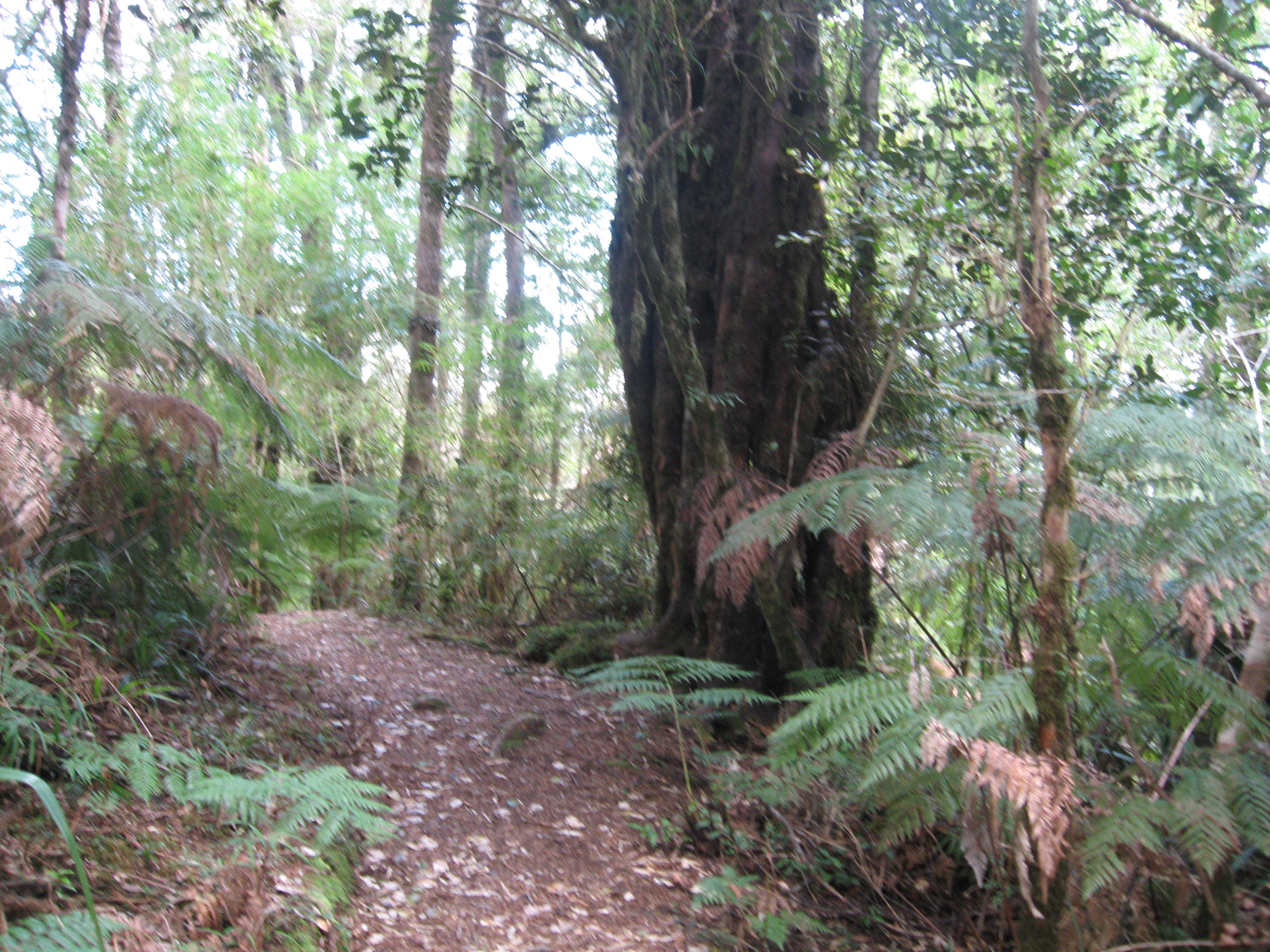
Valdivian temperate rainforest in the Oncol Park.

Environmental issues in Chile include deforestation, water scarcity, pollution, soil erosion, climate change, and biodiversity loss, especially in its industry-heavy "sacrifice zones". The country of Chile is a virtual continental island that spans over (2,600 miles) 4,200 kilometers. It is bounded by the Pacific Ocean on the west, the Andes Mountains on the east, and the Atacama Desert in the north; it is home to several important eco-regions, such as the Chilean Winter Rainfall-Valdivian Forests, a biodiversity hot-spot that harbors richly endemic flora and fauna, and the Tropical Andes, which stretches into northern Chile. The country has a wide variety of climates due to its large size and extreme geographical features including glaciers, volcanoes, rain forests, and deserts. Chile faces many environmental issues that impact both its people and economy.

== Prominent issues ==
There are a series of environmental issues in this country, with a dynamic and diversified economy. Chile's main environmental problems are deforestation and the resulting soil erosion.

Air pollution from industry and transportation and water pollution are especially acute in urban centers. In 1996, Chile's industrial carbon dioxide emissions totaled 48.7 million metric tons. Untreated sewage poses the major threat to the nation's water quality. As of 2001, Chile had 928 cu km of renewable water resources. While 99% of its urban dwellers have pure drinking water, only 58% of its rural dwellers have the same access. Chile is one of the major mining countries of the world and big-scale mining also represents an important environmental challenge. Severe water shortages affecting many local communities were due not only to persistent drought but to structural problems in the policies governing the exploitation of natural resources, including privatized water management; this led to major protests.

== Deforestation ==
From 1985 to 1995, Chile lost nearly 2 million hectares of native forest; these forests were destroyed for pulp, and made way for industrial tree farms. As a result, Chile now has the world's largest expanse of radiata pine tree farms and some of the world's most endangered native forests. Chile had a 2018 Forest Landscape Integrity Index mean score of 7.37/10, ranking it 43rd globally out of 172 countries.

=== Tree cover extent and loss ===
Global Forest Watch publishes annual estimates of tree cover loss and 2000 tree cover extent derived from time-series analysis of Landsat satellite imagery in the Global Forest Change dataset. In this framework, tree cover refers to vegetation taller than 5 m (including natural forests and tree plantations), and tree cover loss is defined as the complete removal of tree cover canopy for a given year, regardless of cause.

For Chile, country statistics report cumulative tree cover loss of 2,394,152 ha (23,941.52 km^{2}) from 2001 to 2024 (about 12.5% of its 2000 tree cover area). For tree cover density greater than 30%, country statistics report a 2000 tree cover extent of 19,214,323 ha (192,143.23 km^{2}). The charts and table below display this data. In simple terms, the annual loss number is the area where tree cover disappeared in that year, and the extent number shows what remains of the 2000 tree cover baseline after subtracting cumulative loss. Forest regrowth is not included in the dataset.

Annual tree cover loss in Chile, 2001–2024. View chart definition.
Tree cover extent in 2000 minus cumulative tree cover loss in Chile, 2001–2024 (loss-only residual; does not account for gain). View chart definition.

Annual tree cover extent and loss
Year	Tree cover extent (km2) (Note: This residual measure does not include forest regrowth.)	Annual tree cover loss (km2)
2001	191,416.11	727.12
2002	190,634.68	781.43
2003	189,805.88	828.80
2004	188,948.61	857.27
2005	187,879.45	1,069.16
2006	186,960.17	919.28
2007	185,743.75	1,216.42
2008	184,512.91	1,230.84
2009	183,627.33	885.58
2010	182,712.37	914.96
2011	181,719.14	993.23
2012	179,971.26	1,747.88
2013	178,948.83	1,022.43
2014	177,755.53	1,193.30
2015	176,694.45	1,061.08
2016	175,556.66	1,137.79
2017	173,408.56	2,148.10
2018	172,639.62	768.94
2019	171,852.28	787.34
2020	171,146.60	705.68
2021	170,430.51	716.09
2022	169,751.64	678.87
2023	168,678.26	1,073.38
2024	168,201.71	476.55

=== REDD+ forest reference levels and monitoring ===
Under the UNFCCC REDD+ framework, Chile has submitted both subnational and national forest reference emission level/forest reference level benchmarks. On the UNFCCC REDD+ Web Platform, the 2016 and 2023 submission packages are both listed as having assessed reference levels, and both packages list a national strategy, safeguards information, and a reported national forest monitoring system.

The first assessed submission, technically assessed in 2017, covered temperate native forests in five administrative regions—Maule, Biobío, La Araucanía, Los Ríos and Los Lagos—as an interim subnational step toward a national benchmark. It covered four REDD+ activities: reducing emissions from deforestation, reducing emissions from forest degradation, conservation of forest carbon stocks, and enhancement of forest carbon stocks. The technical assessment reported an aggregate assessed value of 159,826 t CO2 eq per year, based on reference periods of 2001–2013 for activities involving land-use change and 2001–2010 for activities in forests remaining forests.

A second submission, assessed in 2024, expanded coverage to the national level and to 12 administrative regions, increasing coverage of native forest lands from 41 per cent in the earlier benchmark to 99.3 per cent. It retained the same four REDD+ activities and the same two reference periods, and the technical assessment reported an assessed combined FREL/FRL of 18,052,357.14 t CO2 eq per year after revision during the assessment process. The technical assessment states that the updated benchmark covers native forests only, excluding exotic forest plantations, and includes above-ground biomass, below-ground biomass, and deadwood, together with CO2 for all four activities and methane (CH_{4}) and nitrous oxide (N_{2}O) from fire-related forest degradation.

== Threatened wildlife ==
There are endangered species in Chile, including the South Andean deer huemul, tundra peregrine falcon, Darwin's rhea (puna rhea), Chilean woodstar, ruddy-headed goose, and green sea turtle. As of 2001, 16 species of mammals in a total of 91 were considered endangered. Of 296 breeding bird species, 18 were threatened with extinction. Also threatened were four types of freshwater fish and 268 plant species.

From 2013 to at least 2023 Chile has been the country in the world with most registered fatal whale collisions with ships. La large number of these collisions have happened near major ports in the regions of Antofagasta, Coquimbo and Valparaíso.

== Water pollution ==
Much of Chile's water resources are privatized due to the 1981 Water Code which created a market based on water rights. Water is treated as an asset where once an individual or private company receives water rights, they can choose to sell or rent water. The concentration of water resources in the hands of a few corporations has resulted in Chile having the highest water rates in Latin America. Nearly 90% of the water rights for hydroelectric production are owned by three companies. There are more water rights that have been issued than there are reserves in some parts of the country which has led to the drying up of groundwater resources. This shortage has particularly affected the rural and indigenous population of Chile.

The mining industry has had a considerable impact on the environment of Chile. One region in particular that been significantly impacted is that of the Atacama Desert, which is considered one of the driest regions in the world. Mining requires a large quantity of water, with much of this water coming from groundwater supplies. Dust from mining operations can also accelerate the melting of snow deposits on the Andean glaciers. This puts a considerable strain on snow melt water supplies which harms the rural communities living in the Atacama. Another source of pollution results from the mining of lithium within some of the lakes in the region. This has the potential to affect local flamingo population as they are reliant on the lakes as a source of shrimp.

The Dominga mining project can severely hurt ecosystems. In January 2023 the project was rejected by the committee of ministers in Chile. As the materials supposed to be provided by the project are necessary for sources of energy like electric vehicles and solar panels, the issue raised questions about the right ways of energy transition, like promoting walking or public transit instead of electric cars.

== Air pollution ==
Increased economic activity has resulted in a degradation of Chile's air quality. Santiago, the capital city of Chile, is surrounded by mountain ranges which facilitates the accumulation of pollutants from car emissions and industrial development over the region. Hospitals become overcrowded as a result of respiratory-related problems each year in Santiago. The air pollution in Santiago has resulted in an average of 20,000 people suffering from respiratory problems every year. It is common to use wood for heating in the southern portion of Chile, which tends to experience cold temperatures, as it is less costly than gas or electricity.

== Arica ==
The port city of Arica's water is severely contaminated by arsenic, mercury, cadmium and lead due to Chilean company Promel accepting 20,000 tonnes of toxic waste from Swedish mining conglomerate [Boliden AB] from 1984-1985. Despite contradicting Sweden's international obligations according to the Decision-Recommendation (C(83)180) of the Organization of Economic Cooperation and Development, the toxic waste was marked as "nonhazardous" when shipped to Chile, where Arica's health authorities allowed the import. The waste was then not processed for safety by Promel, sitting exposed for decades and still un-contained as of June 2021. An estimated 12,000 residents of Arica have experienced serious health impacts including anemia, cancer, respiratory issues, birth defects, miscarriages, and infertility. The Swedish Supreme Court refused to hear the case in 2013. In 2021 the United Nations called for the hazardous waste to be removed to Sweden and safely disposed of, saying the environmental consequences in Arica are an unaddressed human rights violation.

== Sacrifice Zone: Valparaíso ==
The Valparaíso Province is home to the country's largest private and public ports: Quintero and Valparaíso. This area has a high concentration of polluting industries including copper smelters, thermoelectric plants, and power plants. The Province of Valparaíso is known as a national Sacrifice zone, having high concentrations of heavy metals and other pollutants.

=== History ===
Traditionally the people of the Valparaíso Province found their living through artisanal fishing and agriculture. In the past several decades the region's main economy is tourism, in 2016 there was an estimated 1.498,295 tourists visiting the area.

The largest ports in the country are located in the Valparaíso Region. The port of Valparaíso is also home to the Chilean Navy base. High rates of emissions, black and Brown carbon (BC and BrC), come from truck and ship activities in this port. The public transportation in the city of Valparaíso is run off of diesel fuel.

=== Industries in the area ===
Quintero Puchuncaví have 15 polluting industries in the region. Many of these industries were built in the early 1960s and have been expanded upon since then. Industries include: Concón oil refinery run by Empresa Nacional del Petróleo (ENAP) and Ventanas Power Plant (the largest power plant in Chile) run by AES Andes, Ventanas Division Copper Smelter operated by the world's largest producer of copper Codelco, and Nehuenco Power Plant operated by Colbún S.A.

=== The ocean ===
There have been several oil spills offshore of the Valparaíso region. In 2014 there was a spill which resulted in 37,000 liters of oil being dumped into the ocean after two tankers, the LR Mimosa and the Monobouy Terminal, connection broke. in 2015 Doña Carmela leaked 500 liters of oil, and in 2018 the ship Ikaros leaked slurry oil. Once a prosperous fishing economy and now, residents of Quintero Puchuncaví say no one will buy their fish which are contaminated by heavy metals. Many fishermen have lost their jobs because of the pollution, and fisheries have been ruined.

=== Reformation efforts ===
In 1992 there was a judicial appeal filed by several women from Puchuncavi against the ENAMI smelter Ventanas, this was filed against the refinery for the toxins it emitted. Chile's National Human Rights Institute considers Quintero and Puchuncaí a sacrifice zone, and after a pollution related health crisis in 2018 there has been an uproar for the right to a clean and healthy environment. This event lead to a suite against the state for violating Article 19 No. 8 of the Chilean Constitution, the right to live in a pollution free environment, plaintiffs include FIMA and the Terram Foundation. The case is still pending, as of April 2019.

=== Government intervention ===
In response to the protests against the pollution of industries in the Valparaíso region the government created the National Commission of the Environment (CONAMA) The Plan of Decontamination of Windows which dealt locally with the emissions from Codelco, has been attempting to reduce emissions from the refinery. in 1965 the Interregal Regulatory Plan of Valparaíso stated that Quintero Bay was risky for human settlement. Despite this there has been an expansion of industrial and housing development.

=== Local organizations and movements ===
There are many movements in the region which have organized against the negative health impacts of the polluting agents. ASOREFEN (former Workers’ Association Enami Codelco Refinery Ventanas or Regional Association of Ex Officials of Enami Ventanas) is a group of former employees of Codelco's Ventanas refinery, organized against the company's pollution. Many of the people within it are referred to as Men in Green, which is the people who were first directly exposed to the toxins, usually from working in close contact with them.

Cabildo Abierto Quintero-Puchuncavi is a local organization fighting for the decontamination of the sacrificial zone.

Women of Zones of Sacrifice in Resistance of Puchuncaví-Quintero, an organization established in 2016 in response to health crisis' like the La Gerda school poisoning. These women came together with the ideology of Latin American ecofeminism, to fight against being in a sacrifice zone.

Dunas de Ritoque is a local environmental NGO in Quintero Puchuncaví, fighting for the preservation of the environment. Other Organizations involved in the health crisis of the Valparaíso Province include: FIMA, Ecosystems, Institute of Political Ecology (IEP), Oceana, CODEFF, Terram Foundation, Greenpeace and Sustainable Chile.

== Habitat fragmentation ==
In the Maulino forest fragmentation appears to not affect overall plant diversity much, and tree diversity is indeed higher in fragments than in large continuous forests.

Fragmentation of Valdivian temperate rainforests into non-contiguous areas is known to reduce the abundance of monitos del monte in a given area, but has little or no impact on whether it occurs in an area or not.

== See also ==
- Valdivia Pulp Mill controversy
- VLCC Metula oil spill
- Pascua Lama mining project
- Environmental Water Quality Chile
- Mosacat
