= Water resources management in Chile =

- Withdrawals by sector 2000: Domestic: 11%; Agriculture: 63%; Industry: 25%
- Renewable water resources: 922 km^{3} (221 cu mi)
- Surface water produced internally: 884 km^{3} (212 cu mi)
- Groundwater recharge: 140 km^{3} (34 cu mi)
- Overlap shared by surface water and groundwater: 140 km^{3} (34 cu mi)
- Renewable water resources per capita: 54,868 m^{3}/a (1,937,600 ft^{3}/a)
- Wetland designated as Ramsar sites: 159,154 ha (393,280 acres)
- Hydropower generation: 40%

Water Resources Management (WRM) in Chile is widely known for its 1981 Water Code—written after General Augusto Pinochet took control through a military coup d'état. Free-market mechanisms became the economic philosophy in WRM, including the development of water markets and tradable water permits. A major reform to the 1981 Water Code was signed in 2005 to address social equity and environmental protection concerns. Water resources management in Chile is shared among the private sector which provides investment for infrastructure and distribution, and agencies provide regulatory oversight, maintain records, and issue water rights. Chile is negotiating formalized agreements with both Bolivia and Argentina to manage shared resources and water storage projects. Chile is also supported in rural water supply with $150 million in loans by the World Bank and the Inter-American Development Bank.

Chile has three distinct hydrological regions:

1. The dry northern regions, including the Atacama Desert, one of the driest places on earth
2. The central regions are temperate and support the largest population centers of Santiago and Valparaíso
3. The sparsely populated southern provinces receive large quantities of rain and snow.

There are a number of important rivers in Chile. The longest river in Chile, the Loa River, is located in the Atacama Desert. The largest river by volume, the Rio Baker is found in the Aysén Region, of Patagonia, and the Biobío, a source of hydropower, and the Maipo supplies Santiago with water.

Water quality is quite good in Chile and is recognized for outstanding water supply and sanitation systems. The National Commission of the Environment (CONAMA) set a goal to treat 95% of wastewater by 2010. Point source pollution from mining effluent and nonpoint source agricultural runoff is a problem as untreated water discharges into lakes, rivers, and aquifers. Chile has improved in this area since the 1980 declaration to 'live in a pollution-free environment'.

Chile has increased exports of fruits and wine requiring improvements and growth in irrigation technology and management. Future hydroelectric projects on the Baker River are in planning stages and should help Chile cope with its energy demands. Hydroelectric projects generate 40% of Chile's electricity. Copper mining is a major contributor to Chile's GDP and requires large volumes of water; thus creating contention between domestic uses for water and the needs to meet export demands of copper and fruits. Many glaciers exist in Chile and climate change is increasing the rate of melting. As melting continues, experts agree that hydropower, irrigation, and water supply for human consumption may be diminished.

== Water resources management history ==
Beginning in 1855, the State Civil Code granted licenses to private parties for exclusive use of water. Nearly one hundred years later, Chile adopted the 1951 Water Code that provided a system of water rights administration very similar to that practiced in the Western United States in that the government granted provisional water rights that became protected property rights after being used. In 1967, a new water code was enacted to replace that of 1951 and was part of agrarian law reform. The 1967 Water Code was intended to empower landowners to receive water and attempted to redistribute water as a component of the governments strategy to reform agrarian policy. The 1967 Water Code strengthened Government control of water and enabled redistribution of large estates and the expropriation of land and water rights to be reallocated and without any compensation to the previous holders. Land expropriated prior to 1974 was divided into small farms and the rights to land and water were granted to the current occupants, including approximately 48,000 small farmers. These reforms in part, and a deteriorating economic situation led to the military overthrow of Allende in 1973. The new military government of General Augusto Pinochet began adopting free-market economic policies and then signed a new constitution in 1980. The 1981 Water Code was soon to follow.

=== The Chilean water management model and 1981 Water Code ===
Protected by Chile's 1980 Constitution, the 1981 Water Code established the framework by which the allocation and management of water resources are employed in Chile. Internationally known as the "Chilean Model", the Chilean experience in water resources management is characterized by its use of free-market forces and water markets to reallocate water to high-value use. Although private water rights existed in Chile prior to 1981, the previous water codes restricted the creation and operation of an efficient water market. When the Water Code was being drafted in the late 1970s and early 1980s, the government was concerned with irrigation and agriculture. The framers of the 1981 Water Code sought to achieve the efficiencies of market reallocation of water within agricultural and irrigation markets. As Hernan Buchi, ex-Finance Minister of Chile (1985–1989), stated, "the objective of the governmental action in this field was to create solid water use rights in order to facilitate the proper operation of the market as an allocation mechanism".

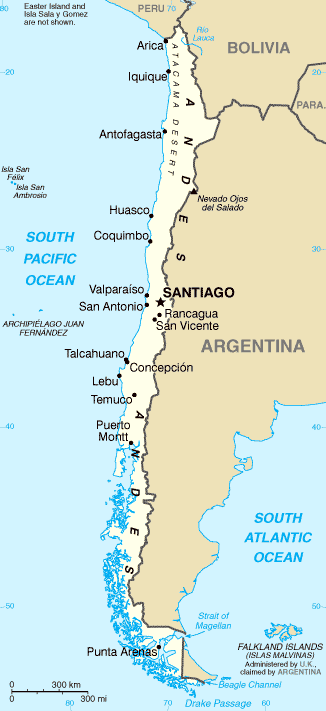
Map of Chile

In his book on Chilean water law, "The Siren Song", Carl. J. Bauer provides a balanced critique of the Chilean model with both positive attributes and areas where the model has not worked so well. The problems include poor "environmental protection, river basin management, public interest, social equity, coordination of multiple uses, and resolution of water conflicts". Furthermore, Bauer writes that the legal and institutional framework has become unable to deal with problems related to the model. He goes on by saying that, "the current framework is characterized by a combination of elements that reinforce each other to maintain the status quo:

1. strong and broadly defined private economic rights
2. tightly restricted regulatory authority
3. a powerful but erratic judiciary untrained in public policy issues and holding a narrow and formalistic conception of the law".

With support from World Bank and Inter-American Development Bank economists and opposition from command and control proponents, the Chilean model is widely studied and documented for its methods that are at the same time innovative and ideologically divisive. The 1981 Water Code ushered Chile into a regulatory environment based on free-market water management and away from the command and control methods that had failed prior to 1981 to effectively allocate water resources and capture economic gains. Bauer proposed that together with the 1980 constitution, the 1981 water code has been successful in achieving many of its original priorities, especially those strengthening private property rights. Original priorities of the Chilean model according to Bauer include, but are not limited to: "1) security of private property rights to encourage private investment in water use and infrastructure allowing new mining in northern Chile and the planting of high-value fruits and vegetables for export. 2) Tightly restricted government regulation of water use and water management. 3) Freedom to trade water rights to allow reallocation of water resources from low-value use to high-value use where transaction costs are low and water is scarce. 4) Autonomy of private canal users' associations from the government. This has encouraged organizations to improve their administrative and technical capacity. These associations primarily operate in the agricultural sector. 5) Creation of non-consumptive water rights to encourage hydropower developments".

Summarized below, power sharing and divided responsibility are hallmarks of the 1981 Water Code:

- The executive power of the government is charged with the authority to plan, regulate, and promote the appropriate use of all water.
- Private stakeholders have greater power to invest in both domestic and agricultural water uses, water system maintenance, and play a role in the management of water supply and sanitation.
- Under the Ministry of Public Works, the Water Directorate carries out all measurement, research, and is authorized to grant water use rights.
- The Water Cadastre under the Water Directorate records all water rights and transactions.

=== 2005 Water Code reform ===
The reform of the 1981 Water Code was passed in 2005 to address social equity and environmental concerns. For example, while efficiencies were gained and investment increased, the allocation of water rights without limits started to create problems such as the monopolizing of water rights for surplus, speculation, and to prevent competition into various markets. Details of the reform involved fifteen years of meetings, negotiation, disputes, and concessions. Throughout the political struggle to reform the Water code, the government's position on water markets became more favorable and they proposed reforms in response to strong political opposition from conservative political parties and private sector business interests.

Major aspects of the 2005 reform include: 1) Giving the President authority to exclude water resources from economic competition in cases where necessary to protect the public interest. 2) Obliging the General Directorate of Water Resources (DGA) to consider environmental aspects in the process of establishing new water rights, especially in terms of determining ecological water flows and protecting sustainable aquifer management. 3) Charging a license fee for unused water rights and limiting requests for water use rights to genuine needs, as a deterrent against hoarding and speculation.

Important dates during the fifteen-year water code reform process:

- 1992 The government introduced the first reform project
- 1996 The government made amendments and introduced a second project
- 1997 Water reform approved by Chamber of Representatives
- 1999 Reform was approved in Senate Committees
- 2000 Reform was approved (in general) by the Senate
- 2004 Reform was approved (in detail) in Senate Committees
- 2005 Final project was approved unanimously in both chambers to address social equity and environmental sustainability concerns

Source: Peña, Humberto. Ministry of Public Works : Chile

=== Water Markets ===
New water rights are granted by the General Water Directorate (DGA). When competition for solicited water rights arises, they are allocated through an auction with rights awarded to the highest bidder. An example of average annual water volumes traded between 1993 and 1998 in the Maipo and Mapocho regions recorded transfers of 821 L per/s and 161 L per/s respectively.

Water trading is not a common practice in most areas of Chile and individuals do not have expectations that they can resolve their water allocation problems through water market transfers. This is due to problematic distribution between markets, cultural norms that couple land and water rights together, the urbanization of irrigated land, and high transaction costs in many areas including expenses in titling unregistered rights, information costs, costs to modify infrastructure, and the opportunity cost of time invested in the transaction.

While not widespread throughout Chile, water markets have been well documented in the areas where they have been implemented. Studies have shown active trading for water use rights in the Limari Valley, where water is scarce with a high economic value, especially for the emerging agricultural sector. Trading between sectors has transferred water to growing urban areas in the Elqui Valley and the upper Mapocho watershed, where water companies and real estate developers are continuously buying water and accounted for 76% of water rights traded between 1993 and 1999. In contrast, water markets and trading has been more limited in the BioBio, Aconcagua and Cachapoal Valleys.

The prevailing sentiment from the IDB and the World Bank is that water markets in Chile have been a success. In some regions of Chile, water markets have been successful at achieving the original objectives of reallocating water to higher-value uses and capturing economic efficiencies through trading. Humberto Peña, the former Director of the General Water Directorate (DGA) in Chile, offers an opposing opinion while claiming that the scarcity of trading implies that water markets do not effectively redistribute water.

In water pricing, two elements need to be distinguished: the price of untreated water at the source, and the price of treated water delivered to the final user. In most countries the use of water at the source is free and the price of water recovers part or all of the costs of treating and delivering it. Chile is an exception however; as the 1981 Water Code not only confirmed private property rights to water resources, but also allowed their sale, thus creating a water market and allowing the establishment of prices for water resources. Supply and demand were supposed to determine the allocated water and its price at the source. Price increases that range from 41% to 240% between 1986 and 2000 are only one indicator that market forces are at play in determining what activities are high-value and those that are not.

Water tariffs that are charged by utilities to treat and supply water to residential and commercial users have to be clearly distinguished from the pricing of water resources.

See:Water tariffs in Chile

== Water resource base ==
=== Surface and groundwater resources ===
Chile is characterized by irregular distribution of rainfall totals among three distinct climate regions: the Atacama Desert in the northern region, the temperate and Mediterranean central region, and the cold and rainy southern region. The dry Atacama Desert region receives an average of 44.5 mm of precipitation annually while the southern regions receive 3000 mm of annual precipitation on average. According to FAO, average annual precipitation is 1,522 mm with an annual volume of 1,152 km^{3}. From this total volume, 884 km^{3} will runoff while 268 km^{3} will evaporate from rivers, lakes and reservoirs.

Maipo River
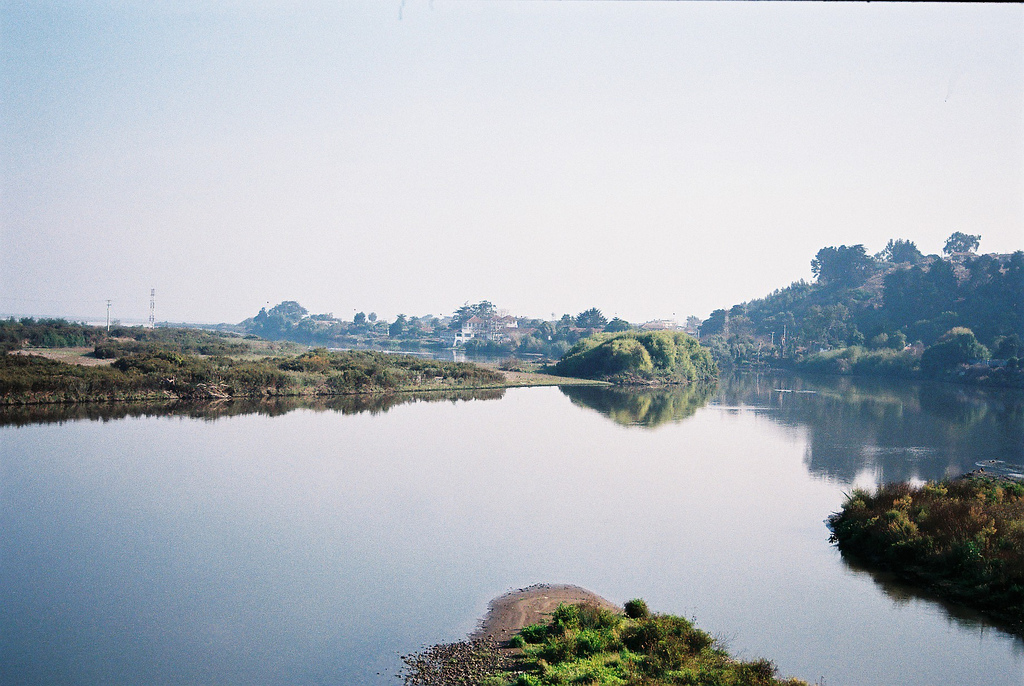
- Primary river running through the Santiago Metropolitan Region in Chile

Chile's rivers are generally short, running from the Andes in the East to the Pacific in the West. The most important rivers in Chile are the Loa River in the Northern Atacama Desert, the country's longest river with a length of 420 km that has suffered pollution from copper mining; the Baker River in Patagonia, the country's largest river in terms of discharge that is the site of Chile's largest planned hydropower plant with a capacity of 2,400 Megawatts; the Biobío River, the country's second longest river that became famous for the construction of controversial Pangue Dam in 1996; the Maule River in the central part of Chile that is well known for its agriculture, including its irrigated vineyards, as well at the literature and poetry it has inspired; and the Maipo River that provides the capital Santiago with drinking water and is also a major source of water for irrigation.

Groundwater usage from aquifers in Chile is notably much less than of surface water. As of 1999, only 1.455 km3 was pumped out of aquifers that are recharged by nine prominent watersheds in Chile.

The table below further distinguishes among fifteen administrative regions of Chile and their main hydrological characteristics.

Regions I through XV correspond to Northern Chile (drier) down to Southern Chile (wetter) respectively. NOTE: *Region XIV is between IX and X; ** Region XV is northernmost.

Administrative Region	Population (2002 census data)	Surface km^{2}	Main Rivers	Average annual rainfall (mm)	Average annual runoff (mm)	Per capita average annual renewable water resources m^{3}
I - Tarapacá	428,594	58,698	Azapa River, Vítor River and Camarones River	93.6	7.1	972
II - Antofagasta	493,984	126,444	Loa River	44.5	0.2	51
III - Atacama	254,336	75,573	Salado River	82.4	0.7	208
IV - Coquimbo	603,210	40,656	Elqui River, Choapa River and Limarí River	222	18	1,213
V - Valparaíso	1,539,852	16,396	Petorca River, La Ligua River and Aconcagua River	434	84	894
Metro Region(MR) - Santiago Metropolitan	7,003,122	15,349	Maipo River	650	200	438
VI - O'Higgins	780,627	16,341	Cachapoal River, Claro River and Tinguiririca River	898	362	7,578
VII - Maule	908,097	30,325	Mataquito River and Maule River	1,377	784	26,181
VIII - Biobío	1,861,562	36,929	Itata River, Biobío River and Laja River	1,766	1,173	23,270
IX - Araucanía	869,535	31,842	Imperial River and Toltén River	2,058	1,476	54,050
X - Los Lagos	716,739	67,013	Valdivia River, Bueno River, Maullín River, Puelo River, Yelcho River and Palena River	2,970	2,423	226,543
XI - Aisén	91,492	109,025	Palena River, Cisnes River, Aisén River, Baker River, Bravo River and Pascua River	3,263	2,828	3,369,942
XII - Magallanes and Antártica Chilena	150,826	132,033	Serrano River, Natales River, Hollemberg River, Gallegos River, Chico River and Azopardo River	2,713	2,338	2,046,684
XIV* - Los Ríos	356,396	18,429	Lingue River, Valdivia River, Cruces River, Bueno River, Pilmaiquén River			
XV** - Arica and Parinacota	189,644	16,873	Cosapilla River, Lluta River, Silala River, Lauca River, Camarones River			

Administrative Region	Population (2002 census data)	Surface km^{2}	Average annual rainfall (mm)	Average annual runoff (mm)	Per capita average annual renewable water resources m^{3}
Totals from above	approx. 16,601,707	800,923	1,522	922.3	44,495
Global average	n/a	n/a	1,050***		6,984
Latin America & Caribbean avg.	n/a	n/a	1,556		27,673

Source for tables above: FAO (2000) data updated with 2002 census figures; ***The Global Precipitation Climatology Project (GPCP) (2006)

=== Storage capacity ===
Buenos Aires Lake
- General Carrera Lake
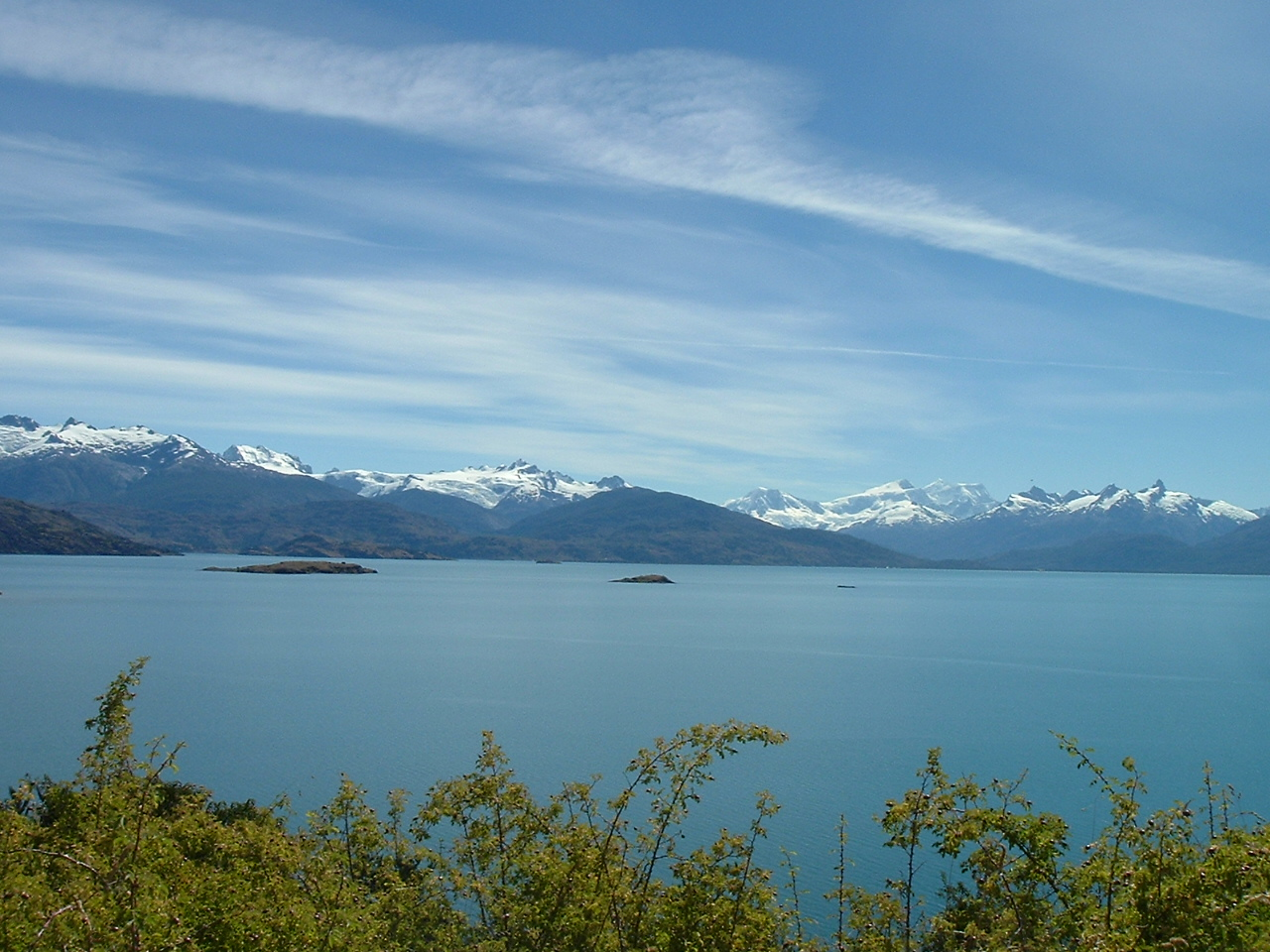

- Location within Chile Location within South America
- Location: Patagonia, Argentina; Chile
- Coordinates: 46°26′S 71°43′W

Artificial storage. Chile has an artificial reservoir capacity of 4.66 km^{3}, of which 4.2 km^{3} is stored behind large dams. Approximately 0.5 km^{3} is stored behind smaller public works dams. A majority of the stored water in these reservoirs is located within three of the fifteen regions. Regions IV, VI, and VII (from table above) account for approximately 80% of Chile's artificial surface water storage.

(See also List of lakes in Chile)

Natural storage. Chile has a large number of natural lakes with an approximate capacity of 7 km^{3}. The southern regions are home to numerous lakes and lagoons, some shared with Argentina. Population density is very low in southern Chile (0.1 to 0.6 persons/km^{2}), therefore demand for water and development of the water resources is minimal.

=== Droughts and floods ===
In the central and most populous regions of Chile rainfall is highly variable, resulting in occasional floods and droughts. In early 2008 one of the worst droughts to hit Chile in decades forced the government to declare an emergency. 50 farming districts in central Chile were affected and farmers were forced to irrigate with dwindling groundwater. Some reservoirs for hydroelectric dams were at an all-time low. While 2008 was one of the worst droughts on record for the central regions, southern regions such as La Araucania, Biobío, and Los Rios Region also received torrential rain for more than three consecutive days in September 2008 causing severe flooding and the declaration of another emergency.

=== Water quality ===
In Northern regions of Chile, point source pollution from mining effluent is a problem. Because there is not much water in rivers, dilution of contaminants is greatly reduced. In Central Chile industrial pollution is an issue. Very often these discharges go untreated directly into river basins, lakes, and irrigation channels. Nonpoint source pollution from agricultural runoff including nitrates from fertilizers and untreated sewage is contaminating underground waters. The severity of the problem has yet to be thoroughly quantified.

== Water resources management by sector ==
=== Drinking water and sanitation ===
Excerpts drawn from:

In Chile, water is safe to drink, with ~99% of water service providers complying with bacteriological and disinfection norms. In a 2006 report on water quality management in Chile, the authors reported that in 2000, 99.1 percent of the urban population and 72.3 percent of the rural population had access to drinking water.

Water quality in Chile has steadily increased after the 'right to live in a pollution-free environment' mentioned above was written into the 1980 Constitution, however, water pollution is still a concern. This is mostly due to point-source discharges of untreated domestic and industrial wastewaters. In the early 1990s, domestic and industrial wastewater discharge totaled approximately 43 cubic meters per second (1,520 ft^{3}/s) with domestic contamination representing 56% of this total and industrial effluent at 44%. The problem was compounded by a lack of chlorination systems among water service providers. Therefore, 20% of water service providers in 1991 did not comply with bacteriological norms. From its inception in 1990, the Superintendencia de Servicios Sanitarios (SISS) put greater attention and effort towards increasing the number of adequate chlorination systems. By 2006, improvements were made regarding chlorination systems and only 1% of water service providers were non-compliant. Furthermore, compliance with disinfection norms increased from 89% to more than 99% in 2006 through similar effort.

Improvements have also been made in wastewater treatment over recent decades as the National Commission of the Environment (CONAMA) set in motion a policy that has seen treatment programs for raw domestic wastewaters increase to 80% in 2006 and 95% by 2010. CONAMA also sought to expand industrial wastewater treatment to 50% of these discharges by 2006. As of 2006, nonpoint source pollution, mainly from agriculture, had not yet been quantified.

=== Irrigation ===
Created in 1975, the National Commission on Irrigation (La Comisión Nacional de Riego (CNR)) is tasked with developing, improving, and maintaining irrigation and drainage infrastructure in Chile. In 1992, CNR estimated 1.8 million hectares (4.7 million acres) of land were under irrigation while total potential capacity for surface irrigation in Chile stood around 2.5 million hectares (6.8 million acres). Irrigated area in Chile accounts for 82% of total cultivated area while the remainder of agriculture uses rainwater.

CNR includes 730,000 hectares of "eventual" irrigated land in their figure of 1.8 million hectares. Only 3% of surface area in Chile is agricultural land, and this sector accounts for only 4.8% of Chile's GDP. Employment in the agricultural sector in 2005 stands at 13.2% of the total labor force. The primary crops grown in Chile are grapes, apples, peaches, wheat, corn, and oats. Most of Chile's crops are grown in the central regions considered the agricultural heartland due to its temperate growing climate.

Chile made a conscious decision to produce high-quality products for the international market, therefore, increasing their annual exports. To achieve this, improvements in irrigation and water management systems were implemented to grow grapes, other fruits, cereals, and vegetables. Additionally, over two decades of research and examination by Humberto Peña has revealed the use of wells in agriculture has increased sixfold. A 1986 law provided subsidies for irrigated lands and was later revised to specifically target poorer farmers. Because of these policies, production increased by $353 million, while water-use efficiency was also drastically improved. Surplus water is used for other purposes such as replenishing natural water bodies to support ecosystem services.

=== Hydropower ===
Baker River
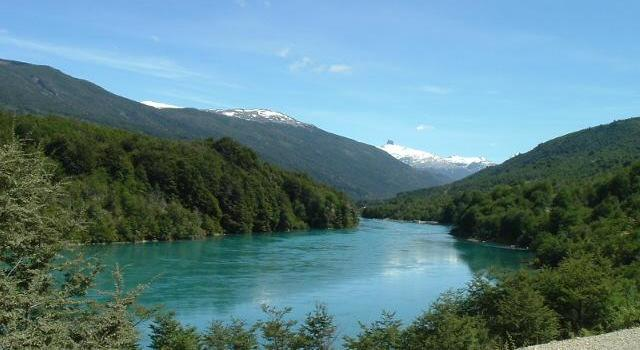

The 1980 Constitution specified for the creation of water rights for non-consumptive use (hydropower) of water and this encouraged hydroelectric power developments. Initially, this created dispute between consumptive-use (irrigation) and electricity generators as to when release of water should be scheduled. The Supreme Court eventually ruled in favor of non-consumptive use because it has a higher value and greater potential to create economic growth.

Existing dams. Dam Capacity in Chile is roughly 4.66 km^{3} while hydropower represents ~40% of the total electricity production. This equates to approximately 4.8 GW of annual hydropower production. In 1992, Chile extracted 63 km^{3} of water throughout the country and of this total, 67.8% was used to generate hydroelectric energy.

Planned dams. In 2009 hydroelectric projects are being developed by electric companies, Endesa and Colbún. The two companies formed a joint venture called HidroAysén. The Aysén project proposes to build five dams on the Baker River and Pascua River at a cost of US$4 billion with an installed capacity of 2,400–2,750 MW. The HidroAysén project is being opposed by the Natural Resources Defense Council (NRDC), Ecosistemas, the Citizen Coalition for Aysen Life Reserve, and Chilean celebrities. The opposition argues the project would be environmentally devastating, lead to more destructive projects, ruin pristine ecosystems, and that alternatives such as conservation policies remain to be instituted.

=== Water Use in Copper Mining ===
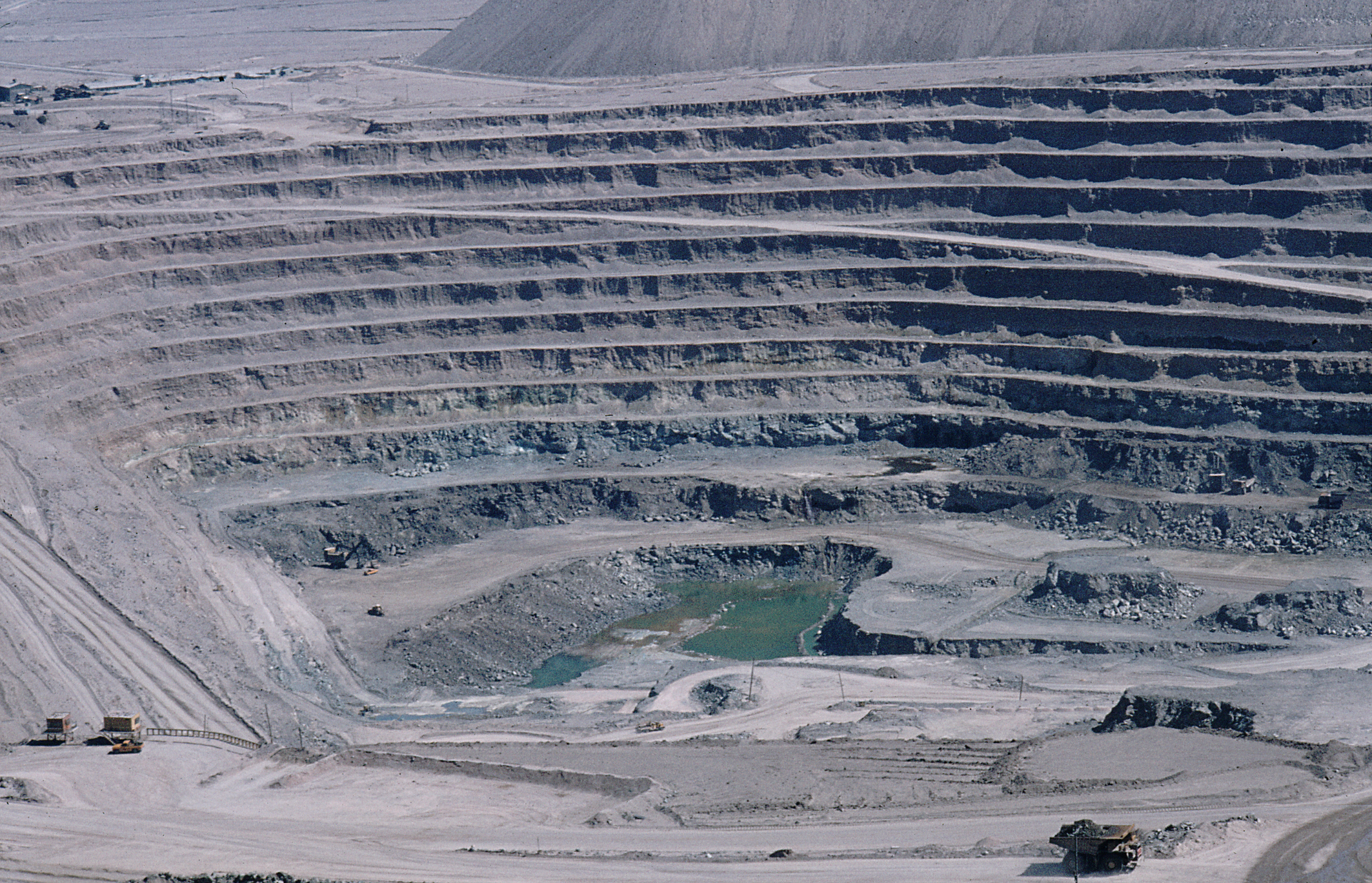
Chuquicamata (Chile). The largest open pit copper mines in the world.

Chile has emerged as the world's number one copper producer and exports have tripled since the early in 1980s. Primarily mined and processed in the Atacama Desert, copper mining historically uses large quantities of water. In 2008 and 2009, copper miners have reduced water use on the heels of Chile's worst drought in decades. Water being key ingredient in various stages of copper extraction, miners will consume 11.5 m^{3}/s (410 ft^{3}/s) of water on average, down from 15 m^{3}/s (530 ft^{3}/s) in 2000. Growing competition for water between mining, cities and farmers has led to an increase in the value of water in Chile.

== Legal and institutional framework ==
=== Legal framework ===
The 1981 Water Code designated water as national property for use by the public and is uniquely noteworthy for establishing transferable water use rights and innovative use of market mechanisms to distribute water rights to users. Reform of the 1981 Water Code began in 1992, and over the course of thirteen years, politicians conducted over 300 long and laborious meetings, engaged in over 50 technical and legal studies, and met with stakeholders several hundred times before the reform was finalized and passed in 2005.

A relevant sidenote, US trained free-market economists instrumental in re-writing Chilean laws in the 1970s known as the "Chicago Boys", advised the Chilean government that market mechanisms could perhaps motivate users to save water, sell their surplus, and transfer water rights to higher value users in other sectors.

In 2014 senators led by Senator Pedro Araya from the dry Antofagasta region launched an initiative to amend the constitution to "nationalize water resources".

=== Institutional framework ===
General Water Directorate (DGA)- The DGA is a regulatory body under the Ministry of Public Works. Their management tasks include facilitating the operation of the system, maintaining hydrological data and a water cadastre, enforces national water policy, and keeping track of water rights information.

Maintained by the DGA, the Water Cadastre contains information on all water use rights granted by the DGA. Additionally, the water cadastre contains hydrological and water quality data, information on water user associations (WUA's), water withdrawals, and all other transactions. According to Robert R. Hearne and Guillermo Donoso, this cadastre does not imply legal title and often is incomplete.

Water Works Directorate (DOH)- Under the Ministry of Public Works, the DOH is responsible for the direction of the Rural Water Supply Program. Additionally, the DOH provides assistance in the construction and maintenance of major water supply including irrigation and drainage infrastructure.

National Commission of the Environment (CONAMA)- This commission serves as a coordinator of national environmental policy, water quality, and environment conservation. In the case of water quality management, CONAMA has established emission standards for discharges of wastewaters into sewerage systems, surface and groundwater and enforcement policies, penalties and fines for non compliance.

Superintendent of Sanitary Services (SISS)- This is a regulation and auditing agency of providers of drinking water and sanitation services in urban areas. SISS sets rates for sanitary services for the economy ministry, oversees compliance with norms, and regulates the control of environmental waste.

National Irrigation Commission (CNR)- Created in 1975, CNR is a legal body under public law. The primary objective of CNR is to develop and improve irrigation and drainage infrastructure throughout Chile.

A historical snapshot of Legal and Institutional Changes in the Water Sector (1977–2005):

Year	Social Area	Productive and Service	Environmental Area
1977	-	Formation of SENDOS	-
1981	-	Water Code is passed	-
1985	-	Electricity privatization	-
1988	-	Water Supply and Sanitation Tariff Law	-
1989	Specific Subsidies for Drinking water	-	-
1990	-	Formation of the SISS	-
1993	Native Peoples Law	-	Protection of wetlands
1994	Promotion for Irrigation for small farmers	Law on Concessions	Basic Environment Law and creation for the system for evaluation of environmental impact
1998	Strengthening the rights of drinking water and sanitation system users	Strengthening regulation for the privatization of water supply and sanitation companies	Regulation of industrial discharges to sewers
1999	Strengthening the rights of electricity consumers	Strengthening regulation of electricity sector	Surface water quality standards
2000	-	-	Standards for industrial discharges to surface waters
2003	Consumer Protection Law	Sports Fishing Bill	
2005: Reform of 1981 Water Code	Sought to limit competition to protect public interest	Charged license fee for unused water rights; instituted measures against hoarding and speculation	General Directorate of Water Resources (DGA) considers establishing environmental rights for water resources

Source: Peña, Humberto. Ministry of Public Works : Chile

=== International agreements ===
With Argentina. In 1991, an environmental treaty between Chile and Argentina was signed and within the treaty there is a "Protocolo de acuerdo" or framework agreement regarding shared water resources between the two countries. The framework agreement seeks to regulate the 'non-transfer" of pollution through waterways (rivers, aquifers, lakes, pipes) from one country to the other. This agreement, while it has not yet become effective is still considered by the FAO to be a global framework on negotiating this kind of agreement. In May 2009, representatives from Argentina and Chile met to formalize a request to their respective Ministers of Foreign Affairs. The request asks that the objectives of the 1991 protocol of shared water resources be complied with. Objectives in Article I of the protocol state, "the parties shall agree that the actions and programs concerning the use of shared water resources be undertaken under the concept of integrated management of the watersheds."

With Bolivia. Historically, there had not been agreements regarding water resources with Peru or Bolivia. Furthermore, Bolivia and Chile have been feuding over the use of the Silala waters for many years. Bolivian officials allege that because the Silala waters are born from 94 springs in Bolivia, it should be compensated by Chile for their use of the water. Chile and Bolivia were reported to be close to an initial agreement following a meeting in Santiago on April 3, 2009. The agreement would require Chile to pay for 50% of the Silala waters, to be paid by Chile's state copper company Codelco and by Ferrocarril Andino, a Chilean group investing in rail. Additionally, Bolivia's foreign relations minister David Choquehuanca has proposed a daily extraction fee totaling about US$6 million per year. Talks have continued in May 2009 to advance details of the international water sharing agreement.

== Environmental issues ==
=== Potential climate change impacts ===
See also Glaciers of Chile

Grey Glacier
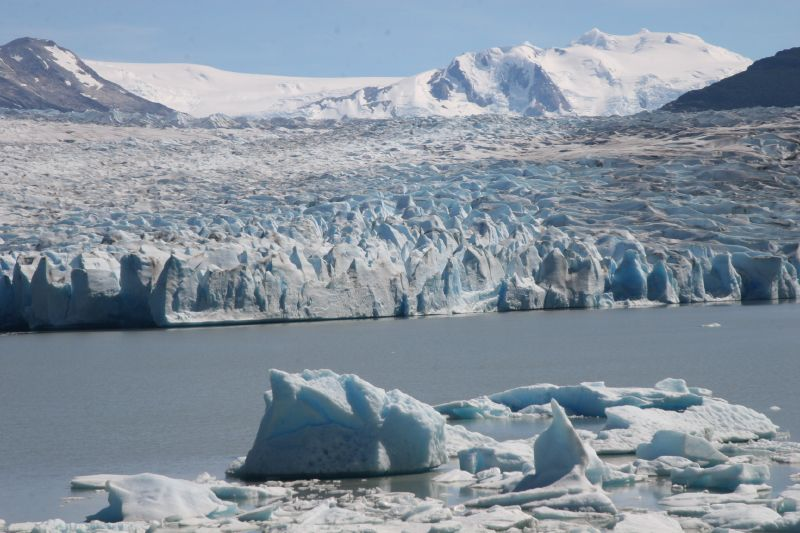
- Grey Glacier
- Interactive map of Grey Glacier
- Type: Mountain glacier
- Location: Chile
- Coordinates: 50°57′S 73°15′W
- Area: 270 km^{2}
- Length: 28 km
- Terminus: Glacial lake

According to the British Foreign and Commonwealth office, Chile is the planet's ninth most vulnerable country to climate change. This office adds, "glacial melt, shifts in rainfall patterns, expanding deserts, and greater frequency in El Niño will have an impact on water supply."

Much of Chile is dominated by the Andes Mountain range and many high altitude glaciers. With rising temperatures, the IPCC warns of increased melting for many of these glaciers, with some of them disappearing as early as 2020–2030. The Third Assessment Report from the IPCC indicate a critical situation for glaciers in neighboring countries such as Bolivia and Peru. The IPCC report goes on to say that glaciers in Chile are drastically reducing their volume at an increasing rate and that changes in temperature and humidity are the primary cause. In an article from Science Daily in March 2008, the news agency reports that, "if the inter-tropical glaciers of Chile, Argentina, and Colombia disappear, water availability and hydropower generation will be affected." Of the thirty test glaciers monitored in the Andes by the World Glacier Monitoring Service (WGMS) only Chile's Echaurren Norte glacier thickened between 2005 and 2006.

Offnews, a sustainable development news forum from Buenos Aires, has aggregated climate change reports and predictions from the IPCC, the World Economic Forum, the UN Economic Commission for Latin America and the Caribbean, the University of Chile, and the Chilean government. Projections in the reporting of Offnews indicate that most of Chile will see a sharp reduction in rainfall. The one exception to reduced rainfall is in northern Atacama desert where increased rainfall is projected.

=== Aquatic ecosystems ===
The 1981 Water Code did not account for environmental issues such as ecological flows for rivers and lakes and ambient water quality, however, the 2005 reform began to address minimum flows to protect aquatic species. It is not clear that lower flows in rivers adversely affect populations of aquatic species, but the Organisation for Economic Co-operation and Development (OECD) has analyzed the status of species in Chile and report that 41 of 44 vertebrate freshwater species are encountering conservation problems. Possible reasons include low environmental flows, climate change impacts, and mining effluents, but direct links have not been established. There are seven UNESCO biosphere reserves, nine Ramsar (convention on wetlands) sites, and three World Heritage Sites in a network of protected areas in Chile.

Ramsar sites in Chile:

- Carlos Anwandter Sanctuary
- Surire salt pan, (Spanish): Salar de Surire
- Huasco salt pan
- Tara salt pan and the Sistema hidrológico de Soncor in the Los Flamencos National Reserve
- Laguna del Negro Francisco and Laguna Santa Rosa in the Nevado Tres Cruces National Park
- El Yali wetlands
- Santuario de la Naturaleza Laguna Conchalí
- Bahía Lomas

=== Virtual export of water ===
In a Global Water Partnership article, the transfer of virtual water out of Chile when exporting copper and fruit is substantial at around 1,900 million m^{3} per year. This equates to approximately 1.4 times the amount of drinking water produced per year in the country.

== External cooperation ==
In 2004, the World Bank approved a US$50 million loan to support a US$90 million project for rural infrastructure services. The Infrastructure for Territorial Development Project for Chile aims to increase the effective and productive use of sustainable infrastructure services by poor rural communities. 30% of the project cost or approximately US$27 million is appropriated to water, sanitation, and flood protection projects. The project is scheduled to close in June 2010.

In 2007 the Inter-American Development Bank (IDB) approved US$100 million loan for a US$200 million project to improve potable water and sanitation services in rural communities throughout Chile. More specifically, disposal and treatment of wastewater will be upgraded with new treatment facilities in rural areas, and improved potable water distribution systems will be constructed. Institutional strengthening is a major component of the program. The Ministry of Planning will determine technical and economic feasibility of eligible project proposals and the program will be carried out by the Subsecretary of Regional Development.

== See also ==
- Environmental Water Quality Chile
- Geothermal power in Chile
- Irrigation in viticulture
