= Water supply and sanitation in Chile =

- The flag of Chile

Data
- Water coverage (broad definition): (improved water source) 96% (2010)
- Sanitation coverage (broad definition): (improved sanitation) 96% (2010)
- Share of collected wastewater treated: 82% (2006)
- Continuity of supply: 100%
- Average urban water use (L/person/day): 196 (2006)
- Average urban water and sanitation tariff (US$/m^{3}): n/a
- Share of household metering: 96% (2006)
- Annual investment in WSS: US$23.1/capita (2006)
- Share of self-financing by utilities: High
- Share of tax-financing: n/a
- Share of external financing: Low

Institutions
- Decentralization to municipalities: No, central government regulation
- National water and sanitation company: None
- Water and sanitation regulator: Yes
- Responsibility for policy setting: Ministry of Public Works
- Sector law: Yes (1988, amended in 1998)
- No. of urban service providers: 20
- No. of rural service providers: n/a

Water supply and sanitation in Chile were once considered efficient and equitable but in 2022 Chile struggled to reliably provide water throughout the country due to drought. Chile's water resources have been strained by the Chilean water crisis, which was partially caused by a continuing megadrought that began in 2010, along with an increased demand for agricultural and other commercial interests.

Chile began rationing water in April 2022. Chile's water and sanitation sector distinguishes itself in a few key ways. First, all urban water companies are privately owned or operated (the only exception is SMAPA), and water was defined as a private commodity in the 1980 Constitution of Chile. Second, the Chilean government instituted a subsidy for water costs in 1990 for citizens located in impoverished regions. Third, Chile became the first Latin American Country to achieve 100% of its population using basic water sanitation in 2016.

== Access ==
In 2015, 99% of the population of Chile had access to "improved" water, of which 99.6% were in urban and 93% in rural areas, and over 180 thousand people lacked access to "improved" water. For sanitation in Chile, in 2015, 99% of the population had access to "improved" sanitation, with 100% and 90%, in urban and rural areas, respectively. Around 170 thousand still lacked access to it.

According to the 2010 data from the WHO/UNICEF Joint Monitoring Programme (JMP) (see below), Chilean urban areas with improved water coverage stood at 96% coverage and improved sanitation was also 96%, which is one of the highest levels in Latin America.

		Urban (89% of the population)	Rural (11% of the population)	Total
Water	Improved water source	99%	75%	96%
Water	Piped on premises	99%	47%	93%
Sanitation	Improved sanitation	98%	83%	96%
Sanitation	Sewerage (2006 JMP survey & census data)	89%	5%	78%

One of the reasons for the high coverage rates in Chile is the early effort to extend and improve infrastructure (see below). As a result, in 1990, 97% of the urban population was already connected to water, and 84% of the population to sanitation.

== Service quality ==
Since 1990 Service quality has been controlled by SISS. The agency examines if the services comply with the Chilean norm NCH 409, which was modified for the last time in 2005 and includes standards concerning water quality, water pressure, and continuity between others.

At the beginning of the 1990s, there were several problems regarding the chlorination systems of some water service providers. Consequently, in 1991 20% of the companies did not comply with the bacteriological norms. In 2006, this share had dropped to about 1%. In the same period, compliance with disinfection norms increased from 89% to more than 99%.

Water supply is continuous (24/7), both in urban and concentrated rural areas where water pressure is adequate.

The sector currently undergoes a complete wastewater treatment investment program to treat 100% of all collected municipal wastewater in 2012. This share has increased from 8% in 1989 to 82% in 2006.

== Water use ==
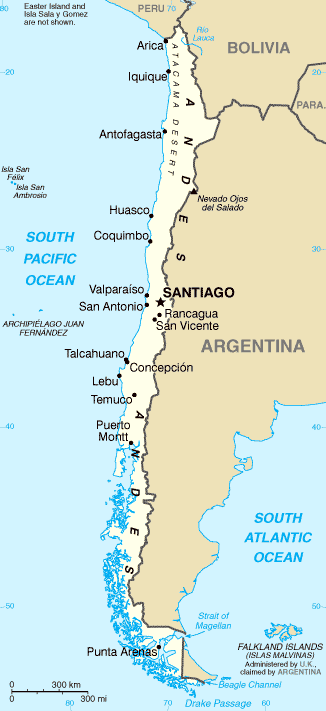
Map of Chile

Water use has gradually decreased since 1998. An estimated 96% of water consumption is measured, resulting in precise information concerning water consumption. In 2006, the total water consumption was 958 million m^{3}. Therefore, each customer used on average of 19.9 m^{3} per month, resulting in 196 litres daily p/capita. Water consumption is highest in the capital region, ranging from 44m³/month (Aguas Cordillera) to 125m³/month (Aguas de Manquehue).

== History and recent developments ==
The Chilean water supply and sanitation sector today are recognized with one of the best coverage and quality levels in Latin America. One of the reasons was a gradual and lasting extension of infrastructure which began in the 1970s. In the 1990s, most utilities improved their economic efficiency and became self-financing companies, some of which have been transferred to the private sector.

=== Before 1977: A fragmented sector structure ===
Before 1977, urban water and sewer services in Chile were provided by a multitude of public entities. The largest entity was the Sanitation Department (Dirección de Obras Sanitarias, DOS) of the Ministry of Public Works, which was in charge of service provision in towns outside of the two largest cities, Santiago and Valparaíso. In these two cities, municipal utilities were responsible for service provision. The Ministry of Agriculture and the Ministry of Housing and Urban Development also had water and sanitation departments. To guarantee its operation, the service was directly subsidised by the national government.

=== 1977–1988: The National Water Company SENDOS ===
In 1977, the national public water and sanitation company SENDOS (Servicio Nacional de Obras Sanitarias) was created, which had 11 regional branches. The municipal utilities in Santiago and Valparaíso were corporatized and modernized. During that time employment in the utilities was significantly reduced.

The public utilities for Santiago and Valparaíso, EMOS (Empresa Metropolitana de Obras Sanitarias) and ESVAL (Empresa Sanitaria de Valparaiso) were strengthened through loans from the World Bank during that period. In parallel, the government of General Augusto Pinochet privatized the electricity and telecommunications sector.

Water coverage during this period increased substantially from 78% in 1976 to 98% in 1988. Sewer coverage increased from 52% in 1976 to 82% in 1988.

=== 1988–1998: Corporatization and regulation ===
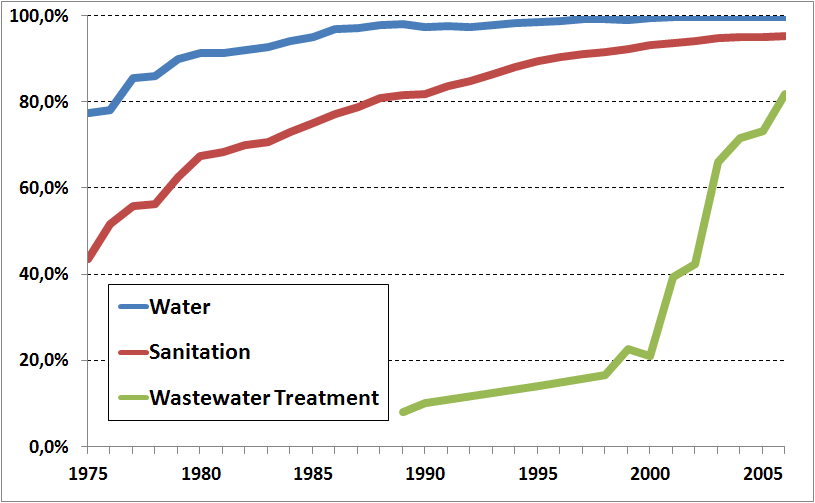
Coverage rates of urban Chile (1975–2006). Source of data: SISS

In 1988, the Chilean people denied General Augusto Pinochet a new term in a referendum, thus passing a key step in the country's transition to democracy. Unlike the privatization and liberalization in other infrastructure sectors, reform of the water and sanitation sector was thus not imposed by the military government but initiated in a climate of democracy.

Between 1988 and 1990, a number of legal reforms and the creation of new institutions had two principal objectives:

1. The service providers should become self-financing through higher tariffs which represent the real costs of the services and more efficient performance
2. Water supply and sanitation coverage and quality should become universal

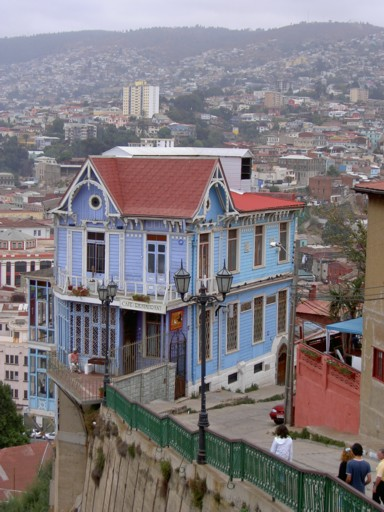
Valparaiso

Therefore, in December 1988 The General Water and Sanitation Law (Ley General de Servicios Sanitarios) allowed the granting of 13 regional concessions to public, private or mixed shareholding companies in each of Chile's regions. In 1990 the regulatory agency SISS (Superintendencia de Servicios Sanitarios) was created through a separate law. An innovative model of tariff regulation was borrowed from the Chilean electricity and telecommunications sector: Efficient cost levels were estimated for an imaginary model company and used as a benchmark to set tariffs for the utilities. Means-tested subsidies (i.e. subsidies that are granted only to those that demonstrably have limited means) were also introduced at the same time to cushion the effect of the tariff increase on the poor. The legal framework with some modifications is still in force today.

Initially, the regional companies remained public, but the intent was to prepare them for privatization. During that period they achieved financial self-sufficiency, were granted tariff increases, improved their efficiency and increased coverage. The regional companies were also transformed into private law companies (Sociedades Anónimas). Investments increased from less than 80 million US dollars annually on average during the 1980s to US$260m in 1998. However, regional utilities still did not have sufficient resources to expand wastewater treatment.

=== 1998-2004: Privatization ===
Under the government of Christian Democrat President Eduardo Frei, the law was amended in 1998 to promote private-sector participation. The stated motive was to increase efficiency, improve service quality and mobilize capital to extend wastewater treatment. Subsequently, all regional branches of SENDOS, as well as the water and sanitation companies of Santiago and Valparaiso, were privatized. Staffing was further reduced, new complaints management procedures were introduced and the share of collected wastewater treated increased significantly.

Contrary to the case of many other Latin American cities where the private sector was asked to provide services, the Chilean service providers were financially self-sufficient when the private sector took responsibility for them. The public companies had been prepared to gradually improve efficiency and profitability since the legal reforms of 1988–1990. This may explain the stable process of private sector participation compared to other Latin American cases. A factor that explains the continuity of sector policies during various administrations is the fact that all Presidents since Chile's return to democracy in 1990 belonged to the same Coalition of Parties for Democracy.

The privatization was carried out in stages, beginning with the five largest of the 13 regional water companies serving more than 75% of users. Because of the staging, it is possible to compare the performance of the privatized and public utilities at that time. This comparison shows that from 1998 to 2001 private companies invested substantially more than public companies and - unlike the public companies - increased their labor productivity significantly. Tariffs increased for both types of companies, but more so for the privatized ones. However, according to one study, "in Chile a social consensus emerged that has made the higher water rates acceptable given the improvements in service quality and the addition of new services such as wastewater treatment."

The participation of the private sector occurred in two different ways. From 1998 to 2001, when the biggest companies were privatized, the majority of their shares were sold to private actors. The government then decided to not continue to sell parts of the companies, but to transfer the operation rights of the companies to private actors for 30 years between 2001 and 2004. This latter way of private sector participation, also known as a concession, differs substantially from selling shares of the companies because the infrastructure remains the property of the Chilean state. All seven companies which were privatized in the second way merged in 2005, assuming the name ESSAN.

According to the World Bank's Private Participation in Infrastructure database, investment commitments by the private sector in Chile's water and sanitation sector reached US$5.7 billion in 1993–2005 through 20 projects, with US$4 billion of commitments made in 1999 alone through 4 projects. 7 projects were divestitures, 10 were concessions and 3 were greenfield projects in wastewater treatment plants.

The Socialist Presidents Ricardo Lagos (2000–2006) and Michelle Bachelet (2006–2010, 2014–2018) maintained the basic institutional structure of the sector established under previous governments based on private service provision, means-targeted subsidies and regulation by a public, autonomous regulator.

=== Further changes in ownership ===
In 2011, the state-holding company Corfo sold its stakes in the three largest water companies—Aguas Andinas, Esval and Esbio—on the stock exchange, primarily to individual local and foreign shareholders. The sale of the 30% stake in Aguas Andinas alone brought the state revenues of US$984 million. The sale of the stakes in the two other companies brought US$564 million in revenues. However, the planned sale of shares in a fourth water company, Essal, was suspended because of low prices offered. In 2015, Antofagasta plc, which had won the concession for the local water supply in Antofagasta in 2003, sold its shares to the publicly owned Colombian multi-utility Empresas Públicas de Medellín (EPM)for US$965 million.

== Responsibility for water supply and sanitation ==
=== Policy and regulation ===
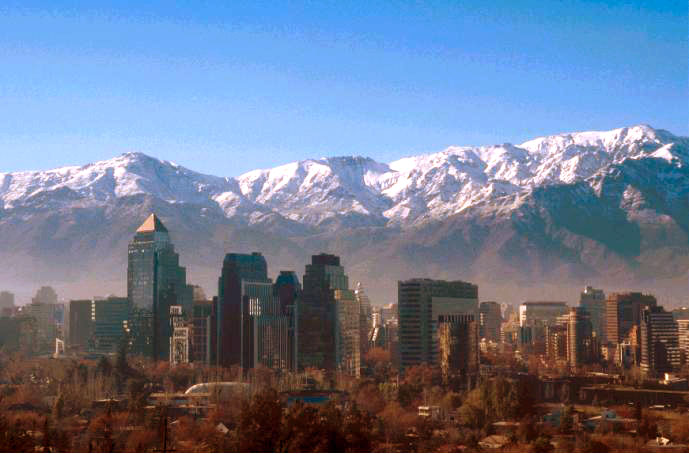
Santiago de Chile

Responsibility for sector policy in Chile is vested primarily in the Ministry of Public Works, which grants concessions and promotes rural water supply and sanitation through its Department of Sanitation Programs. The responsibility for regulation is shared between the Superintendencia de Servicios Sanitarios (in Spanish) SISS, the economic regulator in urban areas, and the Ministry of Health which controls drinking water quality standards in both urban and rural areas.

==== Regulation in urban areas ====
The SISS controls water and sanitation services in urban areas according to financial and quality norms (see above). To guarantee political independence, it is a decentralized organization with its own budget. The SISS has the right to impose fines on the service providers in case of violation of norms, which directly flow into the regulator's budget. Furthermore, it receives user complaints, assesses their validity and acts on them. The agency has databases of all 53 urban service providers.

The water and sanitation regulatory system in Chile is considered by the WHO to be a model not only for Latin America, but also for Europe. One of its innovative features is the use of a hypothetical efficient model enterprise to assist in determining if tariff increases requested by service providers are justified.

==== Rural areas ====
In the Chilean rural areas, the Ministry of Health and the Ministry of Economy are responsible for supervising water cooperatives and water committees. In rural areas there is no independent regulator, such as the SISS in urban areas. Since 1994, the Direction for Water Works (DOH) is in charge of executing the national program of Rural Potable Water (APR). Unlike urban service providers, the rural water supply and sanitation sector has not been subject to regulation like urban services. Currently, the Government of President Bachelet has submitted before the Chilean Congress a Bill to give this sector a new institutional framework. According to Law 19,549 of 1998, urban concessionaires have to provide technical and administrative assistance to water committees and cooperatives in their respective region.

=== Service provision ===
The responsibility for service provision is different in urban and rural areas.

==== Urban areas ====
Water supply and sanitation services in Chile's urban areas is provided by 53 entities. To prevent monopolization, the providers were classified into three categories according to the percentage of the population served by them. No person or society is allowed to possess more than 49% of the companies within one category:

Category	Criterion	Number of companies	Total category share of population
Bigger companies	Serve more than 15% of total population	2	50.5%
Medium-sized companies	Serve between 4 and 15% of total population	6	34.3%
Smaller companies	Serve less than 4% of total population	45	15.2%

The three largest companies are

- Aguas Andinas, serving the capital Santiago, majority-owned by the Spanish company Aguas de Barcelona,
- the Empresa de Servicios Sanitarios del Bio-Bío ESSBIO in the sixth region and eighth region around Concepción, majority-owned by the Latin American Investment Fund Southern Cross, and
- The Empresa Sanitaria de Valparaíso (ESVAL) in the Valparaíso Region owned by various institutional investors.

Together, the three companies serve 63% of urban water customers in Chile.

Until 2011, the Chilean state held 36% of water and sanitation companies through its Production Development Corporation (CORFO). Today, this share has substantially decreased. As shown in the following table which shows the situation of 2006, the majority of the sector was still owned by Chilean actors.

Organization	Percentage	Country of origin
CORFO	35.7%	Chile
Aguas de Barcelona	17.0%	Spain
Southern Cross Group	10.7%	Argentina
Grupo Hurtado Vicuña/Fernández León	8.8%	Chile
Grupo Luksic	5.3%	Chile
Grupo Solari	5.0%	Chile
Municipality of Maipú	2.3%	Chile
Iberdrola	2.0%	Spain
Others	13.2%	

The Ontario Teachers' Pension Plan from Canada is a major shareholder of the private water utilities Essbio and Esval.

==== Rural areas ====
In rural areas, local water cooperatives and water committees provide water supply services. In concentrated rural areas (i.e. rural communities with 150 to 3,000 inhabitants with a concentration of not less than 15 houses per km of water network), there was a significant development due to the national program of Rural Potable Water (APR). However, most isolated housings in Chile still lack adequate water connections.

== Efficiency ==
Non-revenue water ("water losses") in Chilean water companies was on average 34% in 2006, an unusually high level for a sector that is so modern in so many other aspects. The level of non-revenue water is higher than in Germany, France or the United Kingdom (see, for example, water losses in Germany). Indeed, non-revenue water in Chile increased from 29% in 1999 to 34% in 2006, and then decreased to 33% in 2021 showing a minimal improvement in water efficiency. The regulator considers a level of 15% efficient.

In 2006, on average one employee of the urban water supply and sanitation providers served 418 clients, resulting in 2.4 employees per 1000 connections, below the Latin American average of 5.

== Financial aspects ==
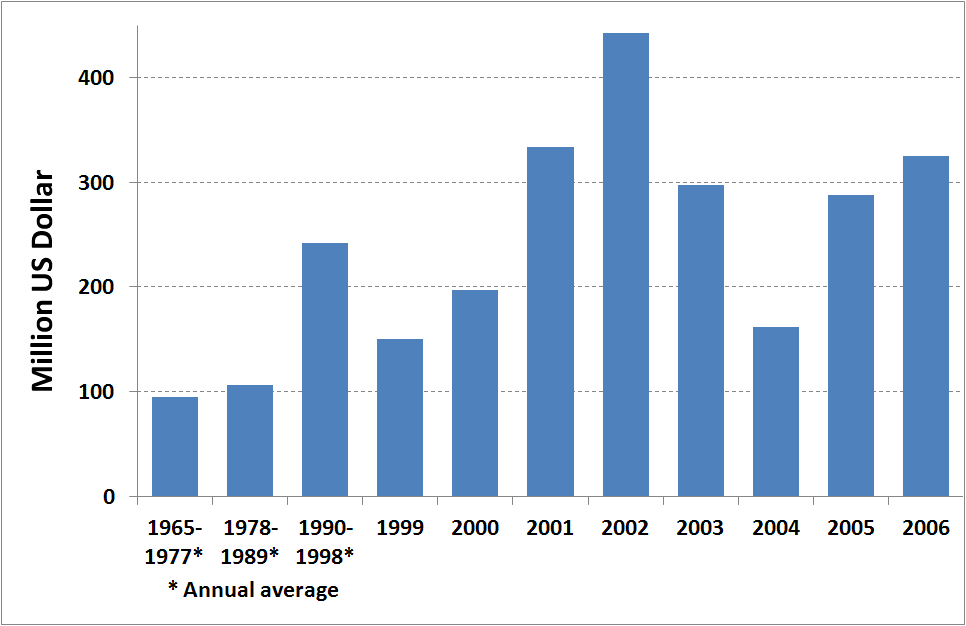
Annual investment in the Chilean urban water supply and sanitation sector. Source of data: SISS, Cariola/Alegria (2004)

Tariff level Water tariffs in Chile differ substantially between regions, reflecting differences in the cost of supplying water. Tariffs in urban areas varied between US$0.8 (Aguas Manquehue in Chicureo) per cubic meter and US$4.1 (Aguas Patagonia in Coyhaique) per cubic meter in 2006. In rural areas, tariffs only cover operation and maintenance costs

Affordability On average, the water and sanitation bill accounted for 1.14% of household income according to a 1998 survey by the National Statistical Institute. They varied between 0.77% for the highest (wealthiest) quintile and 2.35% for the lowest (poorest) quintile.

Financing and Subsidies Urban water and sanitation systems do not receive direct subsidies and are financed through the capital market, and ultimately through user fees. However, Chile has an innovative system of means-tested subsidies that allows qualifying poor households to receive a subsidy administered by the municipalities to pay parts of their water and sanitation bills. Rural water systems receive a partial investment subsidy that is defined in the Ley del Subsidio al Agua Potable y Saneamiento. By law, the subsidy can cover 25-85 percent of a household's water and sewer bill up to 15 m^{3} per month. The client pays the rest of the bill. Beyond 15 m^{3}, households are charged full price. The subsidy is meant to target only those households that are unable to buy water at a subsistence level and is based on willingness to pay. In 1998, about 13% of households benefited at a level of ~$10 per month. The total cost of the program in 1998 was US$36 million. Opponents argue this subsidy program can act as a regressive policy and actually hurt the poor because a false assumption is made that high consumption is positively correlated to high income. On the contrary, poor families do not have access to efficient methods of using water in cooking, cleaning, and washing.

Investment Since the sector was prepared for self-sufficiency, investment increased significantly from an annual average of about US$100m in the period 1965 to 1989 to an annual average of US$242m in the period 1990 to 1998, when the first company was privatized. According to SISS, since 1998 the annual investment ranges between US$151m (1999) and US$443m (2002). Total investment in 2006 was US$325m.

== External support ==
=== Interamerican Development Bank ===
The IDB supports the water and sanitation sector in Chile through two technical assistance grants:

- TC0207000 : Local Development Access to Basic Water and Sanitation Services
- CH-T1004 : Water Services for Disperse Rural Communities

=== World Bank ===
- Chile Infrastructure for Territorial Development

The World Bank supports the water and sanitation sector through a US$90m project approved in 2005, of which about 30% will be used for rural water supply and sanitation. The project is being executed by the Vice-Ministry of Regional Development in the Ministry of Interior. Investments are being undertaken in Coquimbo, Maule Region, Bio-Bio Region, Araucania Region, and Los Lagos Region.

- Chile - Ministry of Public Works DPL

Approved June 14, 2007, 20% of a US$30 million loan was appropriated and spent in the general water, sanitation, and flood protection sectors.

== See also ==
- Water pollution in Chile
- Electricity sector in Chile
- Environmental Water Quality Chile
- Industry Friendly Laws Leaving All Of Chile Without Water
