= Mosacat =

Environmental activist group

Mosacat is an environmental activist group in Chile. The group was a response to Google's data centres in Santiago and Cerrillos worsening local drought conditions. The application was approved unusually quickly, since projects involving water use typically undergo a lengthy review process.

Mosacat obtained a copy of the documentation filed by the company and attached post-it notes to pages that discussed water use. The group determined that the local government was unaware that the project was not simply using wastewater, but freshwater for its cooling systems. Dataluna, the investment firm that was Google's local partner for the project, also denied it used freshwater.

Tania Rodríguez, one of the Mosacat's founding members, was recognized as part of Time 100 AI in 2024. Early members mobilized through previous activism regarding illegal mining. They set up protest signs, advocated for an additional question about whether the local community was in favour of data centres in a 2019 referendum, and filed a lawsuit against the company. The outcome was Google being ordered to halt its activities by an environmental judge.

== See also ==
- Environmental issues in Chile
- Opposition to AI data centers
