= Opposition to AI data centers =

Protests against construction of new AI data centers in Milan

AI data centers have been subjected to political and grassroots opposition amid a drive in construction during the AI boom of the 2020s.

== Motivations ==
Organized opposition to AI data centers has been driven by concerns about their impact on nearby residents, in the form of increased energy use, energy costs, noise pollution, air pollution, and water waste. Concerns have also been raised regarding the displacement of Indigenous communities and the destruction of forests and agricultural lands. The International Energy Agency has reported that the growing pipeline of data-centre projects is straining planning and regulatory systems and delaying grid connections and other approvals.

== France ==
=== Marseille ===
In France, local opposition materialised in response to proposed data centre developments, especially in and around the city of Marseille. Opposition came from activists, such as "Clouds Were Under Our Feet" group, residents, and local politicians. Issues raised related to energy use, environmental impact, and limited local benefits (such as the creation of a few jobs only).

== India ==
=== Visakhapatnam, Andhra Pradesh ===
After the announcement of Google's 1 GW AI data centre project in Visakhapatnam, several citizen groups have raised concerns including the Human Rights Forum. The state government has since approved over 6.5 GW of AI data centre projects in the city and citizens have held multiple protests over lack of transparency, land grab, environmental concerns, water and energy shortages. A "People's Convention on AI Data Centers" was held on 6th September 2026 with various demands including imposition of a moratorium.

=== Thane, Maharashtra ===
Citizen groups in Thane, including Wake Up Thanekar, held multiple demonstrations against proposed Amazon 428 MW data centre.

== Philippines ==
On June 12, 2026, on Philippine Independence Day, activists held protest actions against a planned 1,600-hectare Pax Silica AI industrial hub in New Clark City in Capas, Tarlac. In August 2026, farmers and Indigenous Aeta communities started a petition to stop the building of the AI industrial hub, raising issues of potential displacement from ancestral lands, environmental degradation, and negative effects to farmers' livelihoods. Opposition to the initiative have also come from environmental activists, faith groups, and progressive groups. Concerns have been raised on issues concerning agriculture, water, electricity, and national sovereignty.

In September 2026, activists marched to Clark Freeport Zone at Barangay Balibago in Angeles City to protest the planned AI hub in New Clark City. The protesters cited the impact the data hub will have on farmers, Indigenous groups, the environment, and sovereignty.

== United States ==
=== Protests ===
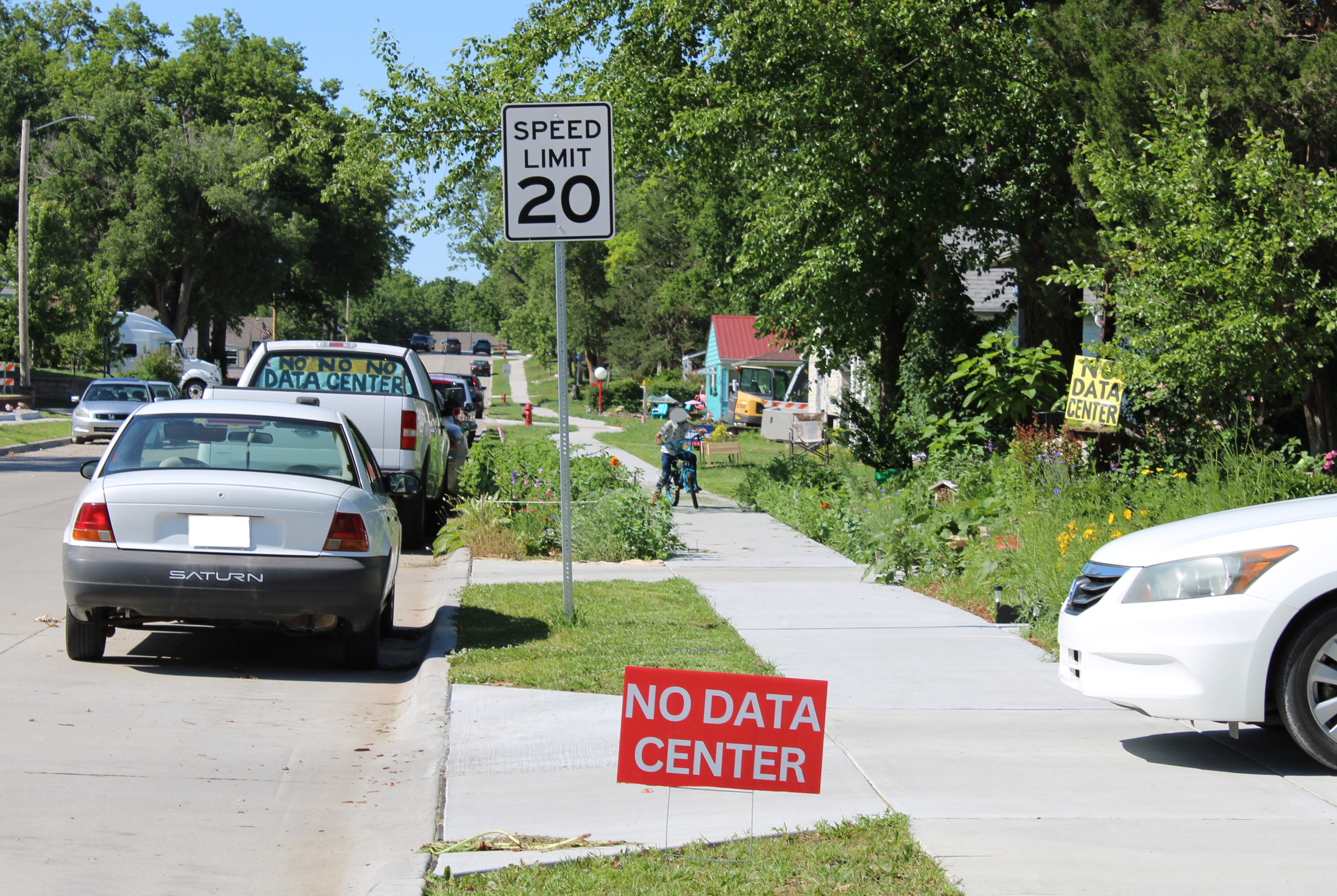
Anti-data-center sentiment in a rural Kansas neighborhood (2026)

There have been protests against AI data centers at least since 2022. In June 2025, a poll of Americans said that only 14% would support a data center being built in their community to support artificial intelligence projects. A Gallup poll conducted in March 2026 showed that 70% of respondents in the US oppose the construction of new AI data centers in their neighborhood. In July 2026, 142 protests across 42 states in the US were held.

==== Goodyear and Buckeye, Arizona: Tract proposal ====
In Goodyear and Buckeye, Arizona, a $14 billion project by developer Tract was withdrawn after local authorities blocked necessary rezoning in response to pressure from resident organizers. Opponents' stiff resistance is due to concerns over building heights, noise pollution, and the potential strain on local utilities. However, the company announced a revised project near the Buckeye airport in August 2024, with the backing of local officials and the mayor.

==== Peculiar, Missouri: Diode Ventures Harper Road Technology Park proposal ====
In Peculiar, Missouri, residents from the group "Peaceful Peculiar" organized to stop a data center proposal from Diode Ventures called Harper Road Technology Park.

Citing concerns around noise and light pollution, health, environmental impacts, jobs, property values, and energy use, organizers attended local planning and zoning meetings in large numbers and lobbied councilors to reject the proposal. Ultimately, the city council unanimously rejected the proposal in September 2024.

==== Chesterton, Indiana: Provident Realty Advisors proposal ====
In Chesterton, Indiana, the Texas-based company Provident Reality Advisors applied for a $1.3 billion construction of a data center complex on the Brassie Golf Club property. Provident Realty Advisors wanted to purchase the 200 acres owned by PPM Chesterton LLC in 2024 order to build a data center complex, with eight buildings and an end user of a hyperscaler. The Town Council of Chesterton released a statement saying that they would never support this project, at least not at the scale and location it was planned for. They cited fears of added noise for locals, electrical or water management concerns, the intrusiveness of a data center built next to houses, and more. Provident released a statement shortly after rescinding their plan, because it was clear than the town of Chesterton would not support them.

==== Cascade Locks, Oregon: Roundhouse Digital Infrastructure proposal ====
Startup data center developer Roundhouse Digital Infrastructure had planned to build out a 10-megawatt data center using a vacant industrial building and nearby 10-acre site in the Port of Cascade Locks, Oregon. After significant organized community opposition, the project was abandoned.

==== Fort Worth, Texas: WUSF 5 Rock Creek East proposal ====
In September 2024, the City Council of Fort Worth, Texas approved a zoning change that would allow construction of a data center. In responses, neighbors mounted opposition citing concerns about traffic, light pollution, energy consumption, water use, and noise issues if the data center were to be built. In response to extensive public comments opposing a tax break for the data center, a city councilor withdrew his motion to approve the tax break. As of April, 2026, the future of the project is still uncertain.

==== Santa Clara, California: GI partners proposal ====
GI partners sought to build a new AI data center in Santa Clara, California, which is already home to many data centers, by acquiring a conditional permit use that would have allowed the developer to knock down a property and replace it with a data center. To obtain this permit they were required to go before members of the Planning Commission. Ultimately, the project was delayed with the Planning Commission requiring GI partners to do more public outreach.

==== Salem, Oregon: Verrus proposal ====
A $5.1 billion dollar data center proposal was discussed at a Salem City Council meeting. Verrus company representatives left the meeting after learning protestors brought a guillotine to a demonstration outside the meeting. The city council voted unanimously to develop a moratorium policy on future data center proposals to be presented by December 2026.

==== Virginia ====
===== Richmond: DC Blox proposal =====
After residents organized to lobby the municipal government to block the proposal to avoid noise pollution and higher energy use, commissioners denied the company's permit.

===== Catlett Station: Headwaters site proposal =====
In Catlett, Virginia, developer Headwaters proposed construction of a data center complex just north of the town in 2020. In response, a residents' organization called "Protect Catlett" was formed to oppose the project. Arguments against the data center involved its impacts on water and power availability, its noise as a residential disturbance, and its destruction of historic and community heritage buildings. Arguments in favor cited job creation and $20 million in local tax revenue if the project were to go through. Protect Catlett utilized town halls and public comments to mobilize opposition to the project. They also dedicated time to educating other residents about the project's negative impacts and canvassing door-to-door in order to garner even more opposition to the project. Ultimately, after fervent opposition from most town residents, the project was canceled by the town and the developer.

===== Culpeper County: Culpeper Acquisitions proposal =====
Culpeper Acquisitions, LLC, proposed a massive $12 billion data center project in Culpeper County, Virginia, designed to feature 4.6 million square feet of space across nine multi-story buildings. Coalition to Save Culpeper (C2SC) is an activist organization formed to resist the development of the project. C2SC has been active on many fronts including, messaging on social media, reaching out to local officials, and organizing meetings to bring community members with aligned interests together. Ultimately, the project was delayed due to unanimous denial by the Culpeper County Planning Commission on June 12, 2024, which was driven by intense opposition from C2SC. C2SC was successful in their mission largely because they were able to get so many people from the community behind it, and put enough pressure on local officials to take action.

===== Midlothian: Province Group proposal =====
In late October 2025, the Powhatan County Board of Supervisors in Virginia voted unanimously to approve the $3 billion data center, despite the county's Planning Commission having unanimously recommended denial several days earlier. The reasoning behind their support for the center is that it will generate substantial tax revenue, reducing the county's reliance on residential property taxes. This appeal of lowering residential property taxes is the major selling point for the center's development. The developer, California-based Province Group, incentivized the Board by being agreeable to its conditions for building the center. The center is still on track for development, but faces local resistance, though little information is available on specific groups opposing it.

===== Warrenton: Amazon proposal =====
Citizens for Fauquier County (CFFC) advocates to "preserve the natural, historic and agricultural resources" of their county. Historically, this has meant opposing the building of a dam or lights in front of fast food stores. This group has recently mobilized in opposition of a plan to build data centers for Amazon. They first filed a suit to stop the construction in 2023 and it has been in litigation ever since. The case hinges on opposition to a 2021 zoning amendment which allowed data centers to be built in town. CFFC's lawyer, Dale Mullen, argues that this amendment violates state law, which requires such amendments to state their "public purpose". They argue that the permit for the Amazon data center was "void from the beginning". The CFFC also organized to vote out town council members who approved the first data center and were up for reelection, replacing them with candidates who opposed the data center. In May 2025, after attending town council meetings to speak out against the data center, the planning commission voted 4–1 to remove the zoning amendment allowing data center construction in town, citing public opposition. Currently, CFFC is advocating along with Piedmont Environmental Group, for phasing out data center tax breaks at the state level.

=== Impact ===
In 2025, local opposition to AI data centers led to the delay or cancellation of projects totaling US$156 billion.

=== Legislation in the United States ===
Legal limits and moratoriums on the construction of new data centers have been proposed at the municipal, state and federal levels in the United States.

==== Municipal actions ====
Many cities have passed resolutions establishing moratoriums. On April 8, 2026, voters in the Wisconsin town of Port Washington approved a ballot referendum limiting the construction of data centers, the first such referendum in the country. The city council of Holyoke, Massachusetts voted 9-4 to ban the construction of any AI data centers using more than 12 Megawatts of power. Monterey Park City Council passed three ordinances banning data center development, and in June 2026, residents voted 90% in favor of banning data center development in their community. Seattle City Council voted in June 2026 to approve a one-year moratorium on data center development. Socorro City, New Mexico adopted a one-year moratorium also in June.

==== State-level actions ====
As of July 2026, state legislation limiting or proposing moratoriums on data centers has been introduced in fifteen states, with legislation passing in one state, failing in six states and being vetoed in one. On April 15, 2026, the Maine state legislature passed a moratorium on new data centers pending further assessments, and a few days later Governor Janet Mills vetoed the legislation. On June 4, 2026, the New York State Legislature passed legislation that would impose a one-year moratorium on new large data centers.

On July 14, Governor Kathy Hochul issued an executive order establishing the first statewide data-center moratorium in the United States. The order paused certain state environmental permits for data centers capable of consuming 50 megawatts or more while state regulators develop environmental standards.

On August 10, the governor of Texas announced a moratorium on approval of new data centers until an audit of connections to the state's electric grid is completed.

==== Federal-level actions ====
Several pieces of legislation have been introduced that could restrict AI data centers, but none have yet advanced out of committees to a vote that could turn them into law:

- Clean Cloud Act (November 2025): would set an emissions performance standard for electricity used by cryptomining facilities and data centers and utilize revenue generated to help save on utility bills.
- Artificial Intelligence Data Center Moratorium Act (March 2026): would restrict construction of AI data centers that have peak power loads in excess of 20 megawatts or liquid cooling systems as well as facilities used for developing and operating AI models at scale until Congress passes comprehensive AI legislation.
- Data Center Tax Accountability and Disclosure Act (July 2026): would require large AI data centers to publicly disclose key information about their energy and water consuption, emissions, backup generation and other operational impacts, as well as restrict the use of a tax break related to capital expenses.
- Ratepayer Protection Act (July 2026): would require states to consider adopting a federal standard directing data centers to pay the full cost of new power generation and transmission upgrades needed to serve them.
- Protecting Ratepayers Act (July 2026): would require that new and existing data centers to get their energy and water from independent sources.
- No AI Data Centers on Federal Lands Act (July 2026): would permanently bar AI data centers on federal land.
- Data Center Bill of Rights (August 2026): would establish a set of authorities for local communities to reject the construction of data centers.

== See also ==
- Luddites – 19th-century English anti-automation group
- AI build-out financing – How data centre buildout is being financed
- NIMBY
- YIMBY
- Wanganui Computer Centre bombing – 1982 protest and bombing in New Zealand
- Mosacat – activist group in Chile
