= Cay (volcano) =

Mountain in Chile

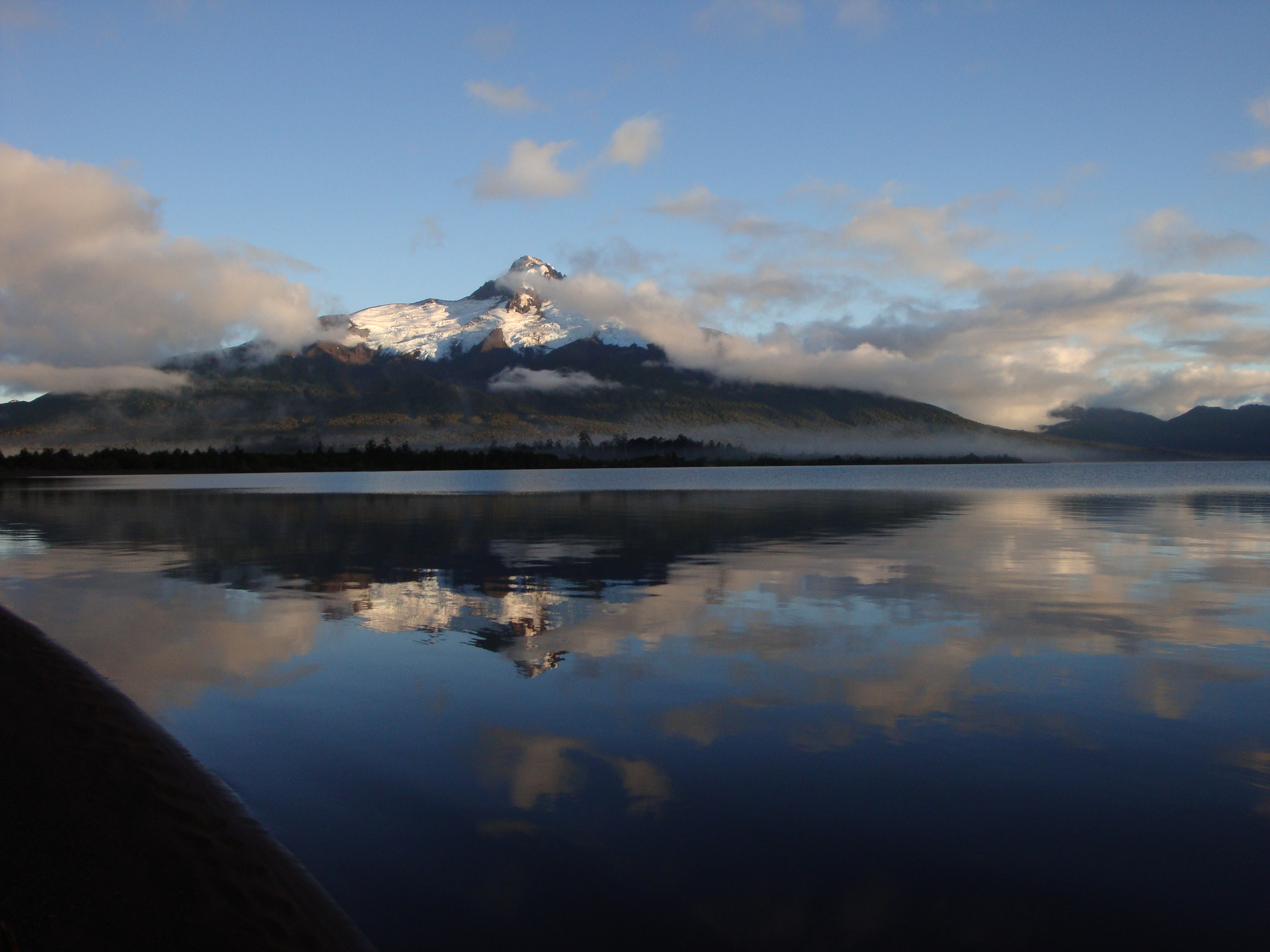
- Cay volcano as viewed from the shoreline of Yulton Lake.

Highest point
- Elevation: 2,090 m (6,860 ft)
- Coordinates: 45°03′45″S 72°59′09″W

Geography
- Location: north of Aisén Fjord, and west of Yulton Lake, Aysén del General Carlos Ibáñez del Campo Region, Chile
- Parent range: Andes

Geology
- Mountain type: Stratovolcano
- Volcanic zone: South Volcanic Zone
- Last eruption: Unknown

Cay is a stratovolcano in the South Volcanic Zone of the Andes in Aysén del General Carlos Ibáñez del Campo Region, Chile. The volcano is located 15 km northeast of the larger Maca Volcano and about 230 km of the Chile Trench at the intersection of NW-SE and NE-SW faults of the Liquiñe-Ofqui Fault Zone.

The volcano is composed from basalt and dacite and there is no evidence of Holocene activity. Below 1000m, several parasitic cones lie on the southwest flank of the volcano.

== See also ==
- Geology of Chile
- HidroAysén
- List of volcanoes in Chile
