= Colico Lake =

Lake in the La Araucanía Region of Chile

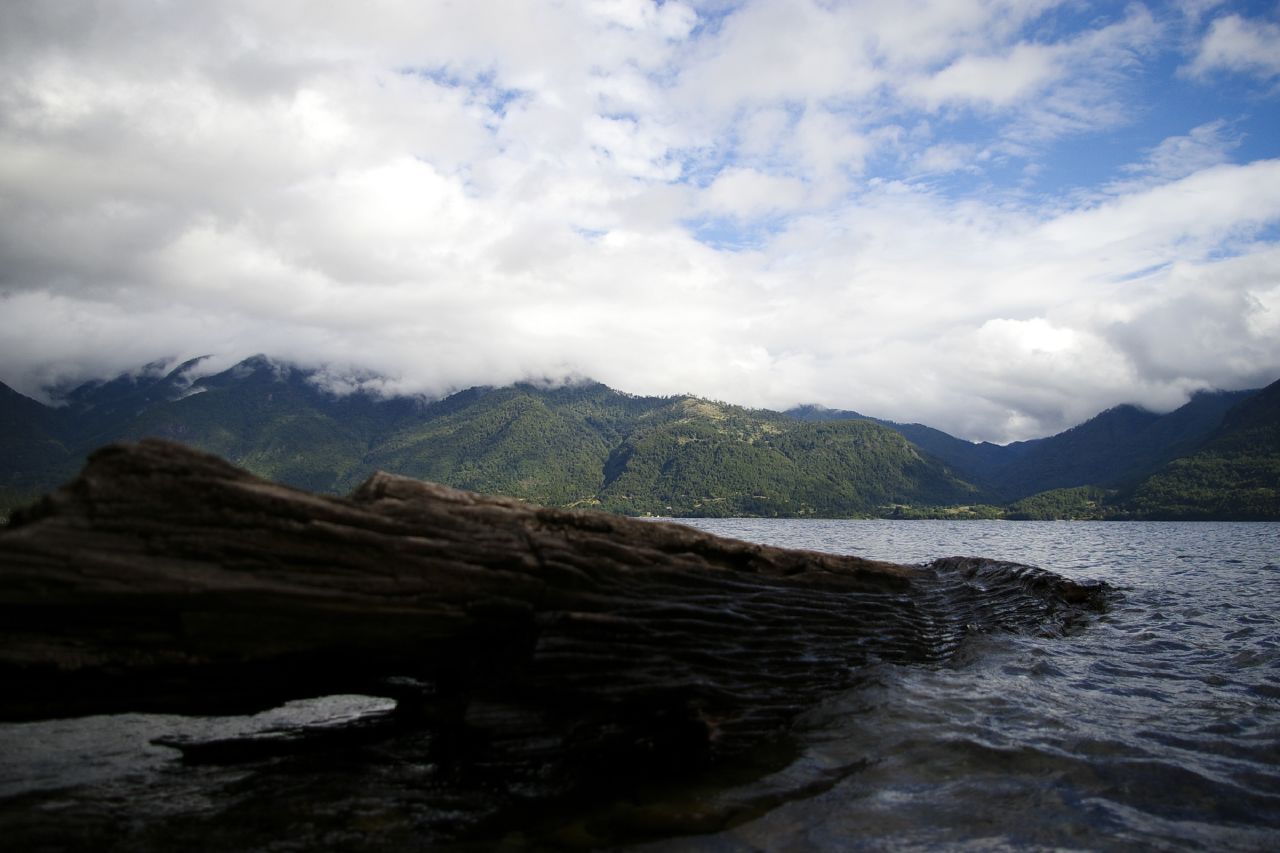

- Location within Chile

- Location: Cautín Province
- Coordinates: 39°05′08″S 71°58′22″W
- Primary inflows: Trafampulli River
- Primary outflows: Colico River
- Catchment area: 8,660 km^{2} (3,340 sq mi)
- Basin countries: Chile
- Max. length: 19 kilometres (12 mi)
- Max. width: 5 km (3.1 mi)
- Surface area: 54.96 km^{2} (21.22 sq mi)
- Average depth: ~ 173 m (568 ft)
- Max. depth: 374 m (1,227 ft)
- Water volume: 9.5 km^{3} (2.3 cu mi)
- Shore length^{1}: 52.3 km (32.5 mi)
- Surface elevation: 473 m (1,552 ft)
- Settlements: Puerto Puma
- ^{1} Shore length is not a well-defined measure.

Colico Lake is located in the La Araucanía Region of Chile. The neighboring Caburgua Lake lies to the east of the lake and the Villarrica Lake to the south. The lake is the second deepest entirely within chilean borders (next to Grey Lake). Colico Lake is the deepest non-cryptodepression in Chile.

Species of fish in the lake include Rainbow trout and pejerrey. Nearby flora includes trees such as coigue and oak, and shrubs such as Chilean firebush, hummingbird fuchsia, and quila.
