= Huishue Lake =

Lake in Chile

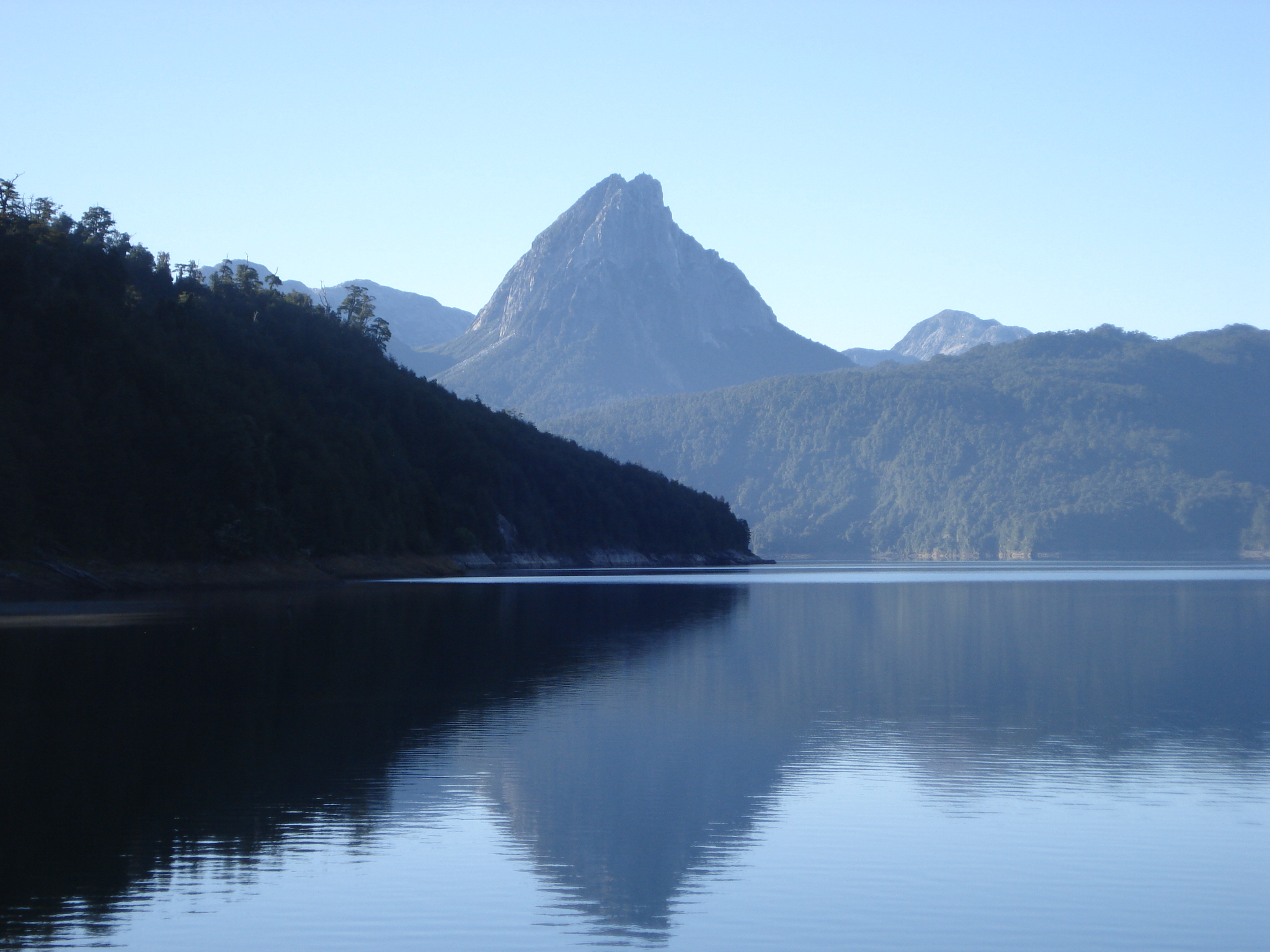
- View of Huishue lake with a granitic glacial horn in the background.

- Location within Chile
- Location: Lago Ranco, Chile
- Coordinates: 40°26′21″S 71°59′47″W
- Primary outflows: Melpue River
- Basin countries: Chile
- Surface area: ~15.1 km^{2} (5.8 sq mi)
- Surface elevation: ~ 500 m (1,600 ft)
- Settlements: nearest town Llifén (30 km)

Huishue Lake (Spanish: Lago Huishue, Spanish pronunciation: [ˈwiswe]), Mapudungun for bad place to live, is located in the Andes of the Lago Ranco commune in southern Chile. More precisely the lake is located 10 km south of Maihue Lake (the drainage basin to which it belongs), 15 km northeast of Puyehue Volcano and 10 km west of the Chile-Argentina border.

Around the year shift of 1948-1949 Chilean poet Pablo Neruda hid in the Fundo Huishue forestry estate from the then illegalized persecution of communists. Neruda left Huishue March 1, 1949 and fled Chile via the Ipela Pass to his exile in Argentina and then Europe.

Huishue Lake on the map

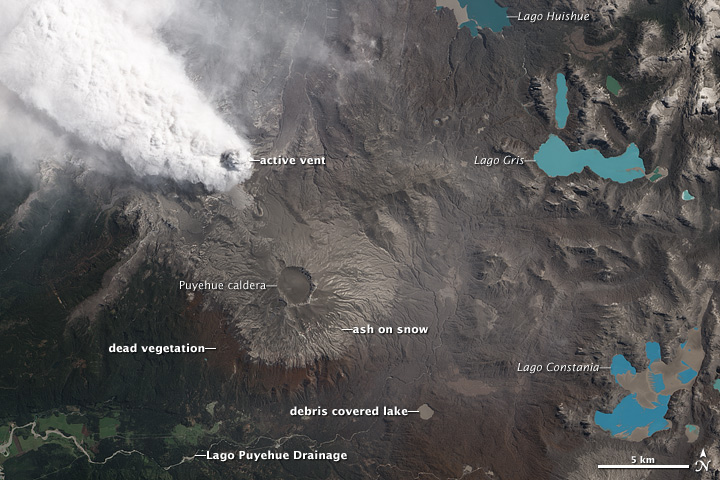
2011 eruption of Puyehue-Cordón Caulle
