= Yulton Lake =

Lake in Chile

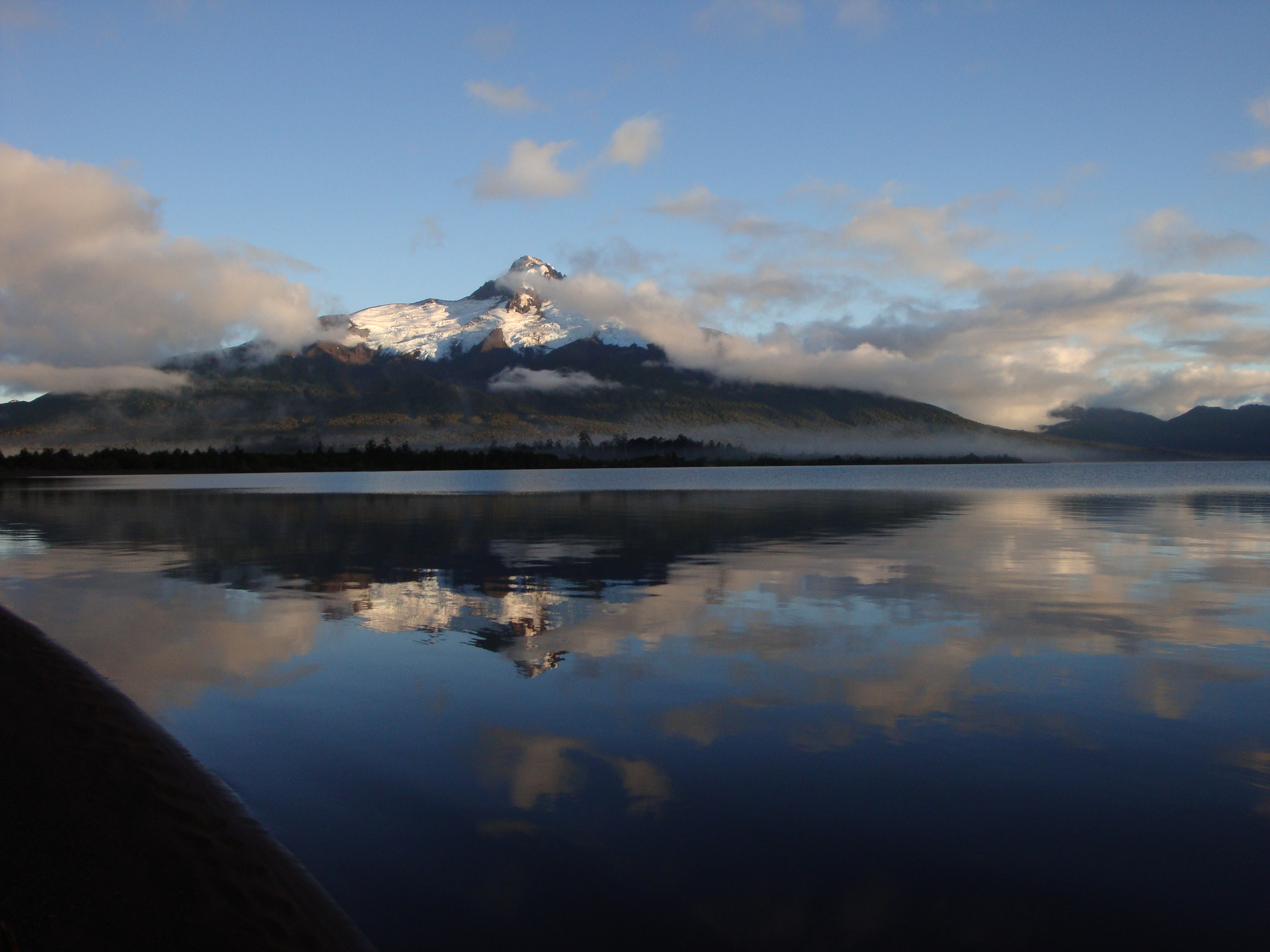
- Cay Volcano in the distance.

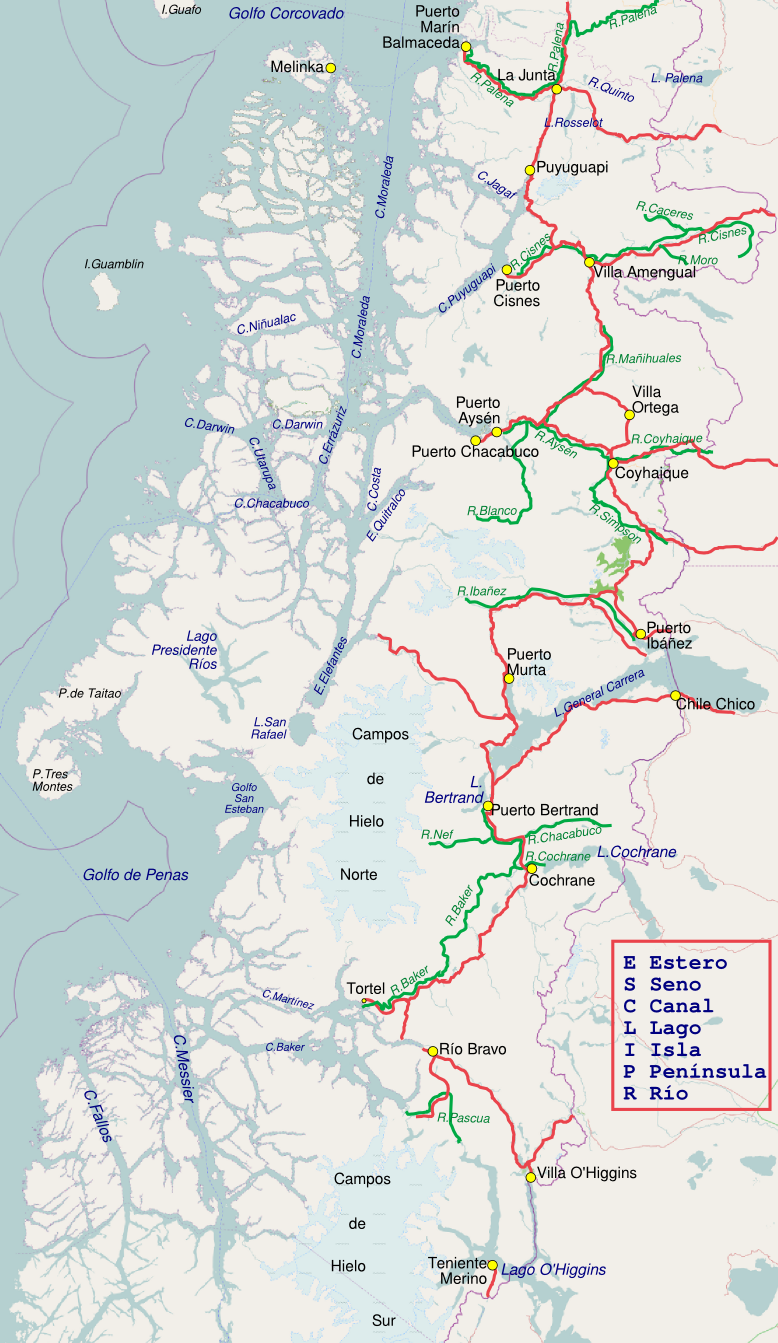
- Yulton Lake, on the map approximately in the middle between Puerto Cisnes and Puerto Aysén

- Location within Chile
- Interactive map of Yulton Lake
- Location: Aysén Province
- Coordinates: 45°06′19″S 72°55′05″W
- Catchment area: 2,100 km^{2} (810 sq mi)
- Basin countries: Chile
- Max. length: 14 km (8.7 mi)
- Max. width: 10 km (6.2 mi)
- Surface area: 62 km^{2} (24 sq mi)
- Average depth: < 80 m (260 ft)
- Water volume: < 4.96 km^{3} (1.19 cu mi)
- Surface elevation: ~300 m (980 ft)

Yulton Lake, situated 4 km east of Cay Volcano and 15 km east of Maca Volcano, is a volcano-dammed lake in Aysén del General Carlos Ibáñez del Campo Region, Chile.
