= Greve Lake =

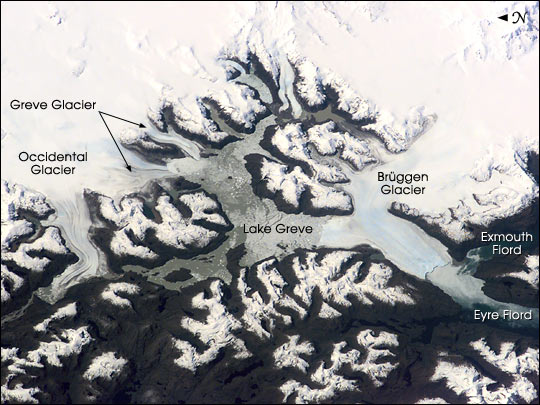

- Location within Chile
- Interactive map of Greve Lake
- Location: Última Esperanza Province
- Coordinates: 49°0′S 73°56′W
- Type: Proglacial lake
- Basin countries: Chile
- Surface area: 240 km^{2} (93 sq mi)
- Average depth: 123.3 m (405 ft)
- Max. depth: 150 m (490 ft)
- Water volume: 29.59 km^{3} (7.10 cu mi)
- Surface elevation: 150 m (490 ft)

Greve Lake (Spanish: Lago Greve) is an ice dammed lake in Chile formed by the advance of Brüggen Glacier. It is fed by several glaciers. Lautaro volcano is located in its vicinity.
