= CODEFF =

Chilean non-governmental organization

Comité Nacional Pro Defensa de la Flora y Fauna
- Purpose: Environmentalism, Conservation, Ecology
- Location: Santiago, Chile
- Region served: Chile
- Method: Lobbying, research, consultancy
- Website: www.codeff.cl

CODEFF or Comité Nacional Pro Defensa de la Flora y Fauna is a Chilean non-governmental organization working on issues regarding the conservation, research and restoration of the environment. CODEFF has created a series of protected areas including Área Costera Protegida Punta Curiñanco.
