= Grey Lake =

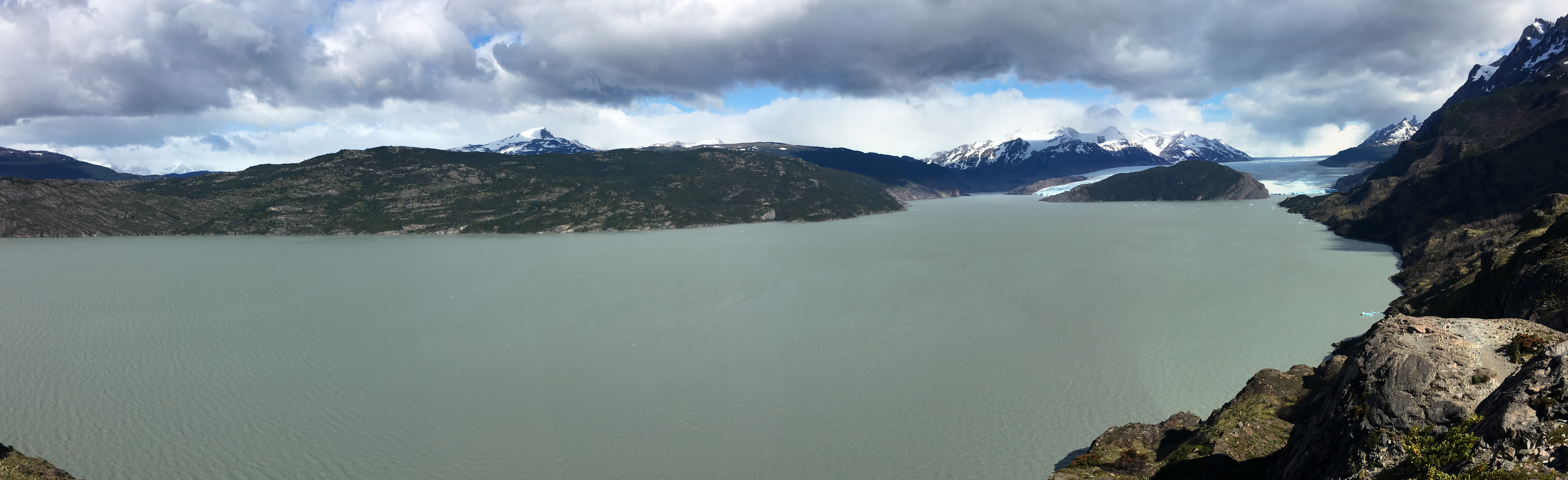
- Grey Glacier

- Location within Southern Patagonia
- Location: Magallanes Region, Última Esperanza Province
- Coordinates: 51°04′S 73°09′W
- Type: glacial lake
- Primary inflows: Grey Glacier
- Primary outflows: Grey River
- Basin countries: Chile
- Max. length: 16.5 km (10.3 mi)
- Max. width: 1.37 km (0.85 mi) to 4.25 km (2.64 mi)
- Surface area: 38.6 km^{2} (14.9 sq mi)
- Average depth: 65.4 m (215 ft)
- Max. depth: 410 m (1,350 ft)
- Water volume: 2.524 km^{3} (0.606 cu mi)
- Surface elevation: 45 m (148 ft)

Grey Lake is a glacially fed lake in Torres del Paine National Park, southern Chile.

The southern Patagonian mountains are reflected on the calm surface waters of Grey Lake.

== Gallery ==
Grey Lake, in the Torres del Paine National Park

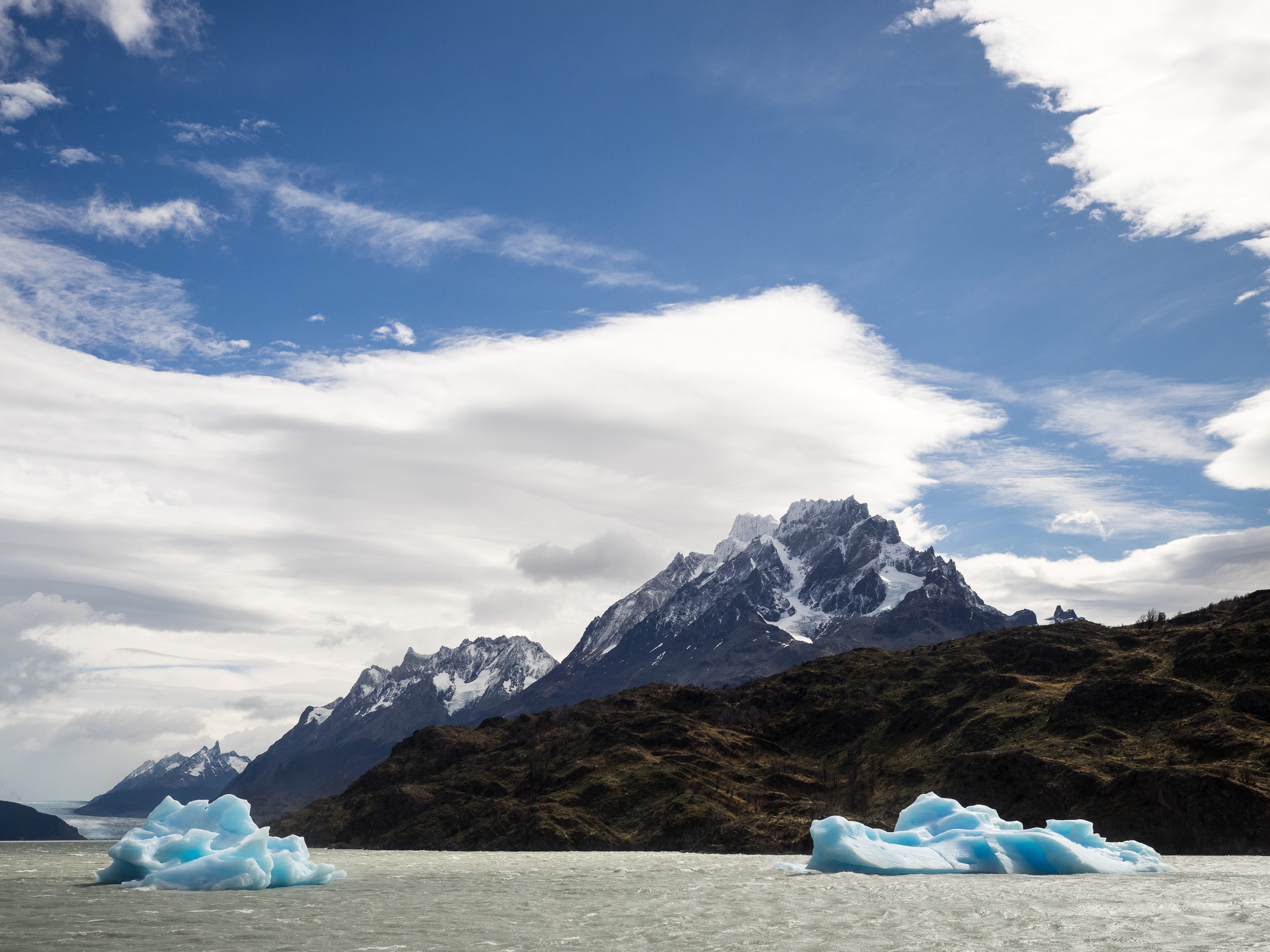
A bergy bit iceberg on Grey Lake from Grey Glacier

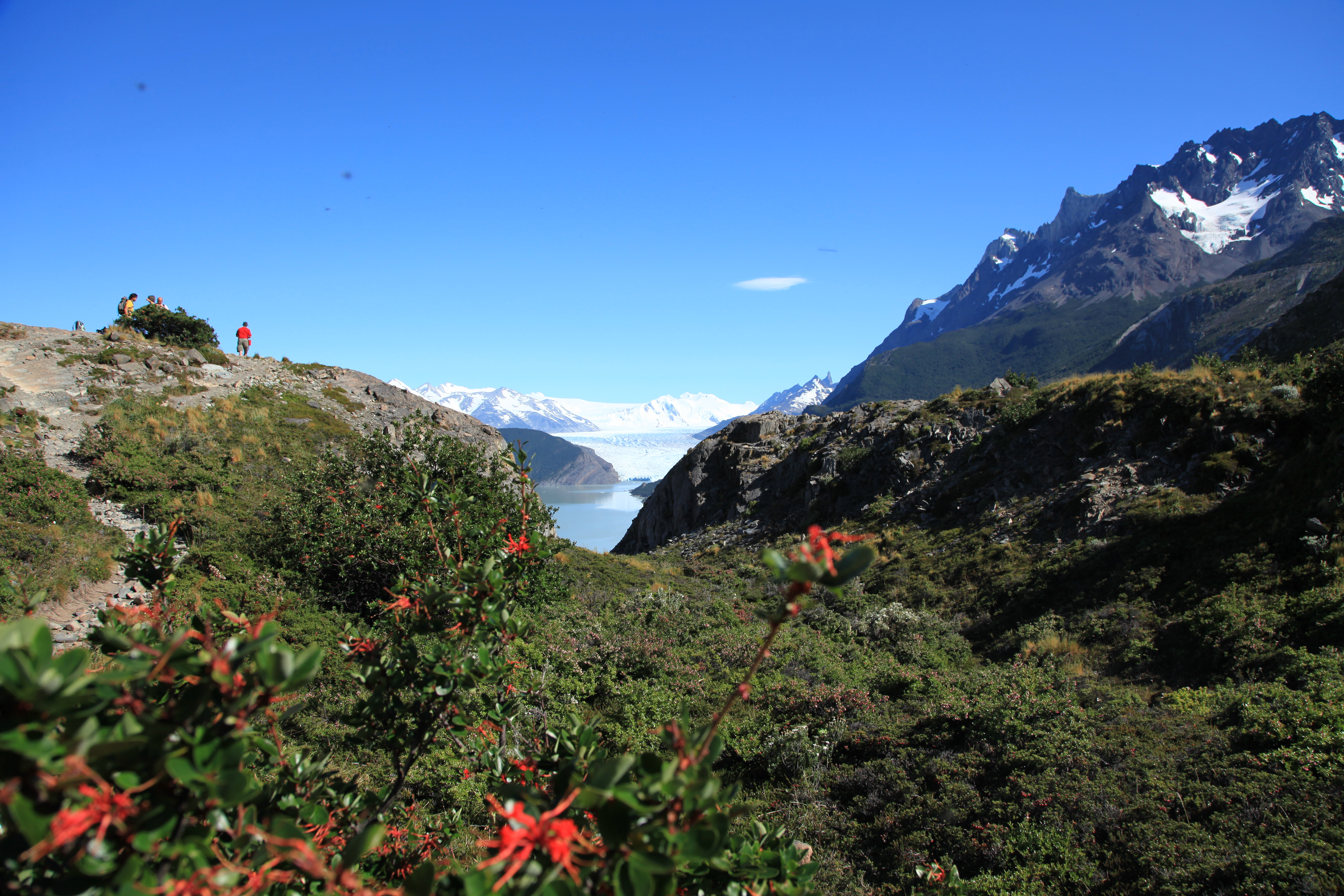
Firebush (Embothrium coccineum) near Grey Lake
