= Environmental Water Quality Chile =

Chile's privatization of water has led to many environmental problems. Since water tends to flow towards money it is being over-allocated to industries such as mining and agriculture. Of course, the ecosystem itself cannot commit any money to securing water rights and the DGA has no powers for legislation, all it can do is monitor the worsening situation. This is especially true in the northern Atacama Region. In some regions of the north the Atacama regional governor has given out water permits totaling 16,000 cubic meters per second where it has been shown that replenishment rates are near 4,000 cubic meters per second. This imbalance causes water scarcity, which combined with warmer temperatures and less rainfall, has stressed local ecosystems immensely. In the Metropolitan Region of Santiago there has been an increase in wildfires and the country is hard pressed to keep up with mitigation efforts. In 2009 there were at least 290 fires, up from 143 in 2008, burning about 1035 hectares of land.

Besides lowering the amount of water available, mining and other industrial activities release a large amount of hazardous chemicals and heavy metals such as chrome, lead, copper, mercury, and nickel into rivers and municipal sewage systems. These metals are known to cause cancers and other neurological diseases. It is estimated that only between 5 and 15 percent of sewage is actually treated, while the remainder is pumped raw into streams and the ocean itself. Solid industrial waste is often sent to landfills where it is exposed to precipitation and surface runoff. This ultimately ends up in streams, or worse, the groundwater aquifer where drinking water is obtained.

In 2000 an assessment determined that a one-time investment of $1.4 million by the industrial firms would generate an annual savings of $1.9 million and a 32 percent reduction in pollution. The assessment showed that it is possible to reduce pollution and save money, if the companies are willing or if the government takes stronger action. It is unlikely companies will take this action their own since the Chilean government is severely lacking in environmental regulation enforcement. That it not to say that there are no incentives for companies to treat industrial wastewater, however. The Santiago water and sewage utility – a private company – imposes charges based on the concentration of industrial effluent and places limits on the maximum amount of major pollutants. It charges the companies a large amount if their waste levels are too high, a stronger incentive to reduce pollution. This demonstrates that companies are receptive to incentives and penalties if they are implemented. If enough social pressure is put on the government perhaps legislation can be enacted to reduce the environmental impact from major industries that have been given much leniency thus far.
