= Chamber of Deputies of Santa Cruz =

Legislative body of Santa Cruz Province, Argentina

Type
- Type: Unicameral

Leadership
- President (Vice Governor): Fabián Leguizamón since 10 December 2023
- First Vice President: Fabiana Barrientos (PSC) since 10 December 2023
- Second Vice President: Mario Piero Boffi (PSC) since 10 December 2023

Structure
- Seats: 24 deputies
- Political groups: Government (13): For Santa Cruz (13); Opposition (11): Union for the Homeland (10); Civic Coalition ARI (1)
- Length of term: 4 years
- Authority: Constitution of Santa Cruz

Elections
- Voting system: Parallel voting
- Last election: 13 August 2023
- Next election: 2027

Website
- camaradelpueblo.gob.ar

The Chamber of Deputies of Santa Cruz Province (Spanish: Cámara de Diputados de la Provincia de Santa Cruz) is the unicameral legislative body of Santa Cruz Province, in Argentina. It convenes in the provincial capital, Río Gallegos.

It comprises 24 legislators, 10 of whom are elected in a single province-wide multi-member district through proportional representation using the D'Hondt method, while the remaining 14 are elected in single-member districts roughly corresponding with the province's municipalities. Elections also use the ley de lemas. The entirety of the Chamber's members are renewed every four years. In addition, party lists employ vertical gender parity.

Its powers and attributions are established in the provincial constitution. The Chamber of Deputies is presided by the Vice Governor of Santa Cruz, who is elected alongside the governor every four years. Since 2023, Fabián Leguizamón of SER Santa Cruz has been vice governor of Santa Cruz, serving alongside Governor Claudio Vidal.

== Electoral districts ==
14 of the 24 members of the Chamber of Deputies are elected in single-member constituencies roughly corresponding to the municipalities of Santa Cruz.

District	Map	Department
Caleta Olivia y Cañadón Seco		Deseado
El Calafate, El Chaltén y Tres Lagos		Lago Argentino
Gobernador Gregores		Río Chico
Las Heras		Deseado
Los Antiguos y Lago Posadas		Lago Buenos Aires
Perito Moreno		Lago Buenos Aires
Pico Truncado, Koluel Kaike y Jaramillo-Fitz Roy		Deseado
Piedrabuena		Corpen Aike
Puerto Deseado		Deseado
Puerto San Julián		Magallanes
Puerto Santa Cruz		Corpen Aike
Río Gallegos		Güer Aike
Río Turbio		Güer Aike
Veintiocho de Noviembre		Güer Aike
