= National Route 3 (Argentina) =

Highway in Argentina

Coordinates: 34°41′7.9″S 58°33′37.8″W

Map of Argentina, showing Route 3, in red

Ruta Nacional 3 ("National Route 3") is an Argentine highway on that runs north-south on the eastern side of the country, between the capital and the southernmost part of the country. It starts at Avenida General Paz (A001) in Buenos Aires, crosses the provinces of Buenos Aires, Río Negro, Chubut, Santa Cruz, ending at the bridge over Lapataia River in Tierra del Fuego. It is 3,045 kilometres (1,892 mi) long.

The road is interrupted between km 2674 and 2696 by the Magellan Strait, which forces access between Santa Cruz and Tierra del Fuego Provinces through Chile, over Ruta CH-255 and Ruta CH-257, paved 57 kilometres (35 mi) north of the strait and paved and treated 148 kilometres (92 mi) south of it. The Magellan Strait itself is crossed by a ferry where it is 4.65 kilometres (2.89 mi) wide, taking twenty minutes.

National Decree 1931 of 3 August 1983 named the part of the road south of National Route 22 (starting at km marker 719) Comandante Luis Piedrabuena.

== Cities ==
These are the main (over 5,000 inhabitants) cities and towns joined by this route, North to South. In the provinces of Santa Cruz and Tierra del Fuego towns under 5,000 inhabitants are marked in italics.

=== Buenos Aires Province ===
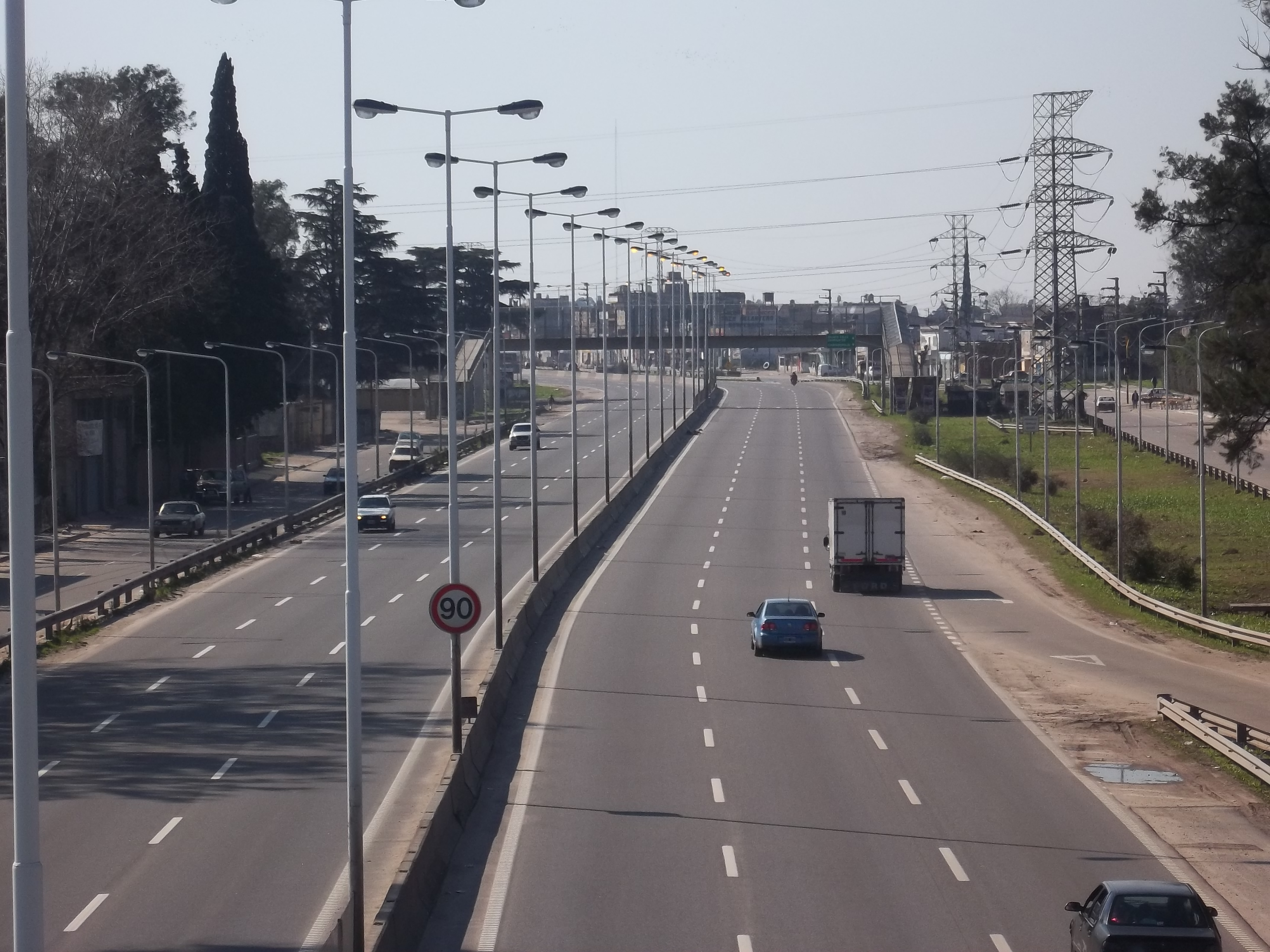
National Route 3 freeway along the southwestern Greater Buenos Aires suburb of González Catán.

Length: 949 kilometres (590 mi) (from km marker 14 to 963).

- La Matanza Partido: San Justo (km 17), Isidro Casanova (km 19), Gregorio de Laferrere (km 26), González Catán (km 32), Virrey del Pino (km 38).
- Marcos Paz Partido: no towns over 5,000 people.
- Cañuelas Partido: Cañuelas (km 63-66).
- Monte Partido: San Miguel del Monte (km 109-112)
- General Belgrano Partido: no towns over 5,000 people.
- Las Flores Partido: Las Flores (km 187).
- Azul Partido: Azul (km 299).
- Benito Juárez Partido: Benito Juárez (km 399-401).
- Adolfo Gonzales Chaves Partido: Adolfo Gonzales Chaves (km 450).
- Tres Arroyos Partido: Tres Arroyos (km 491-496).
- Coronel Dorrego Partido: Coronel Dorrego (km 593).
- Coronel Rosales Partido: no towns over 5,000 people.
- Bahía Blanca Partido: access to Port of Ingeniero White (km 677) over National Route 252, Bahía Blanca (km 681-695), access to General Daniel Cerri (km 698).
- Villarino Partido: no towns over 5,000 people.
- Patagones Partido: Carmen de Patagones (km 962).

=== Río Negro Province ===
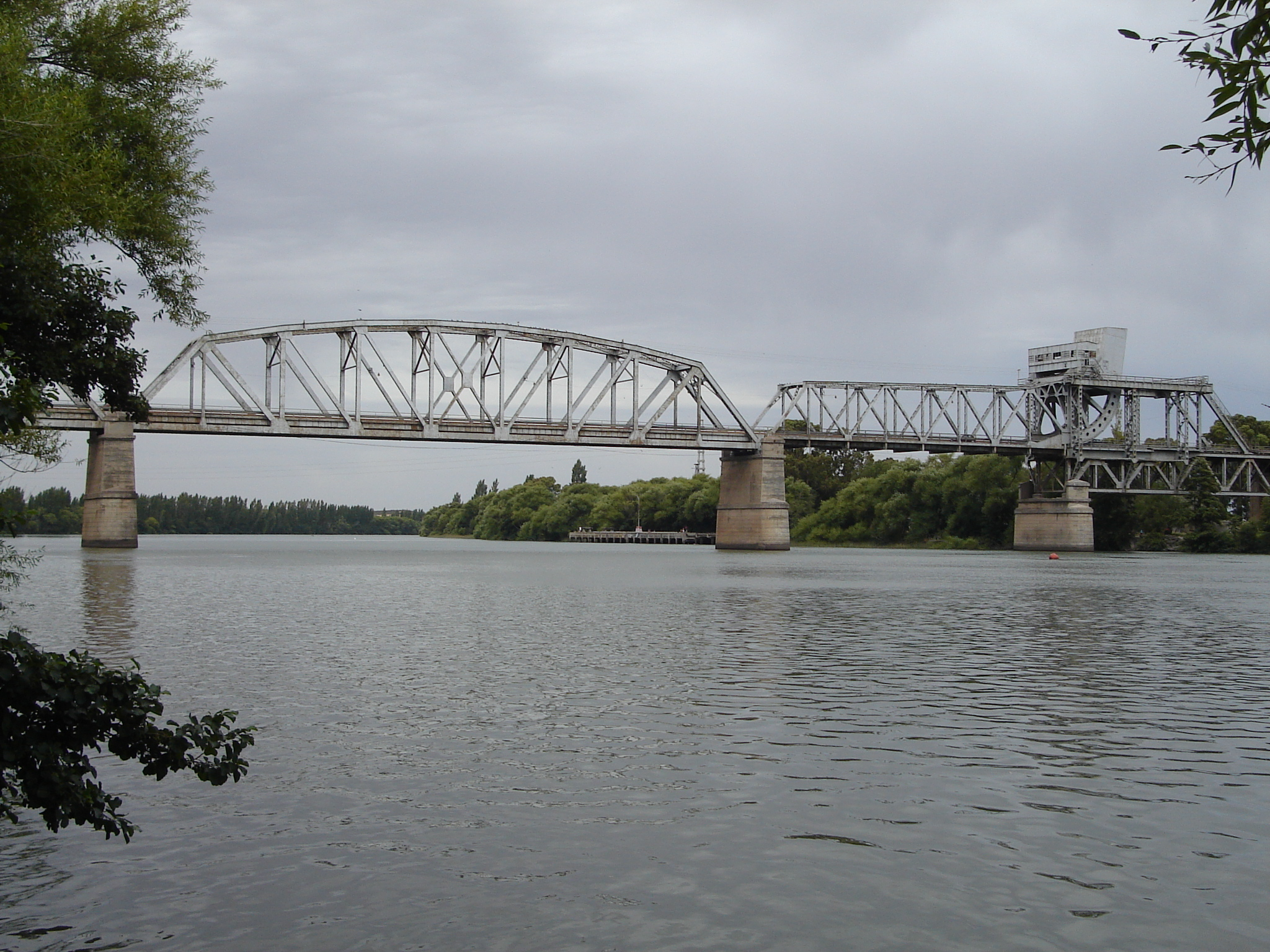
National Route 3 over the Río Negro, between Río Negro and Buenos Aires Provinces.

Length: 339 kilometres (211 mi)(km 963-1304)

- Adolfo Alsina Department: Viedma (km 966).
- San Antonio Department: access to San Antonio Oeste (km 1139) and Sierra Grande (km 1265).

=== Chubut Province ===
Length: 552 kilometres (343 mi) (km 1304-km 1856)

- Biedma Department: access to Puerto Madryn (km 1394).
- Rawson Department: Trelew (km 1451) and access to Rawson (km 1456).
- Gaiman Department: no towns over 5,000 people.
- Florentino Ameghino Department: no towns over 5,000 people.
- Escalante Department: Comodoro Rivadavia (km 1831-1838) and Rada Tilly (km 1843).

=== Santa Cruz Province ===
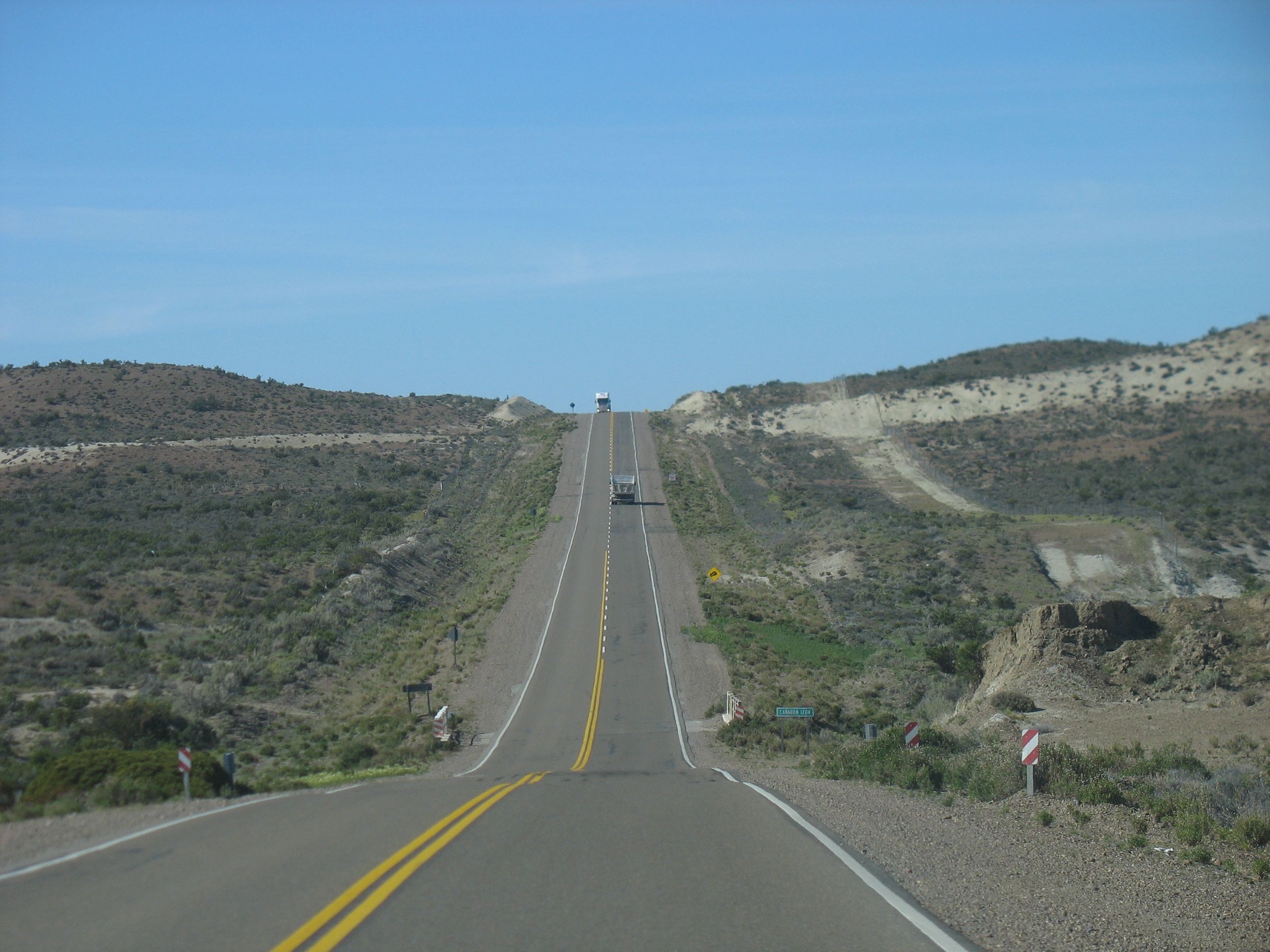
Stretch of National Route 3 through Cañadón León, Santa Cruz Province.

Length: 818 kilometres (508 mi) (km 1856-km 2674)

- Deseado Department: Caleta Olivia (km 1908-1911).
- Magallanes Department: access to Puerto San Julián (km 2252).
- Corpen Aike Department: Comandante Luis Piedrabuena (km 2372).
- Güer Aike Department: Río Gallegos (km 2607-2609).
- Chilean border: Route 255 (Ruta 255) (km 2674).

=== Tierra del Fuego Province ===
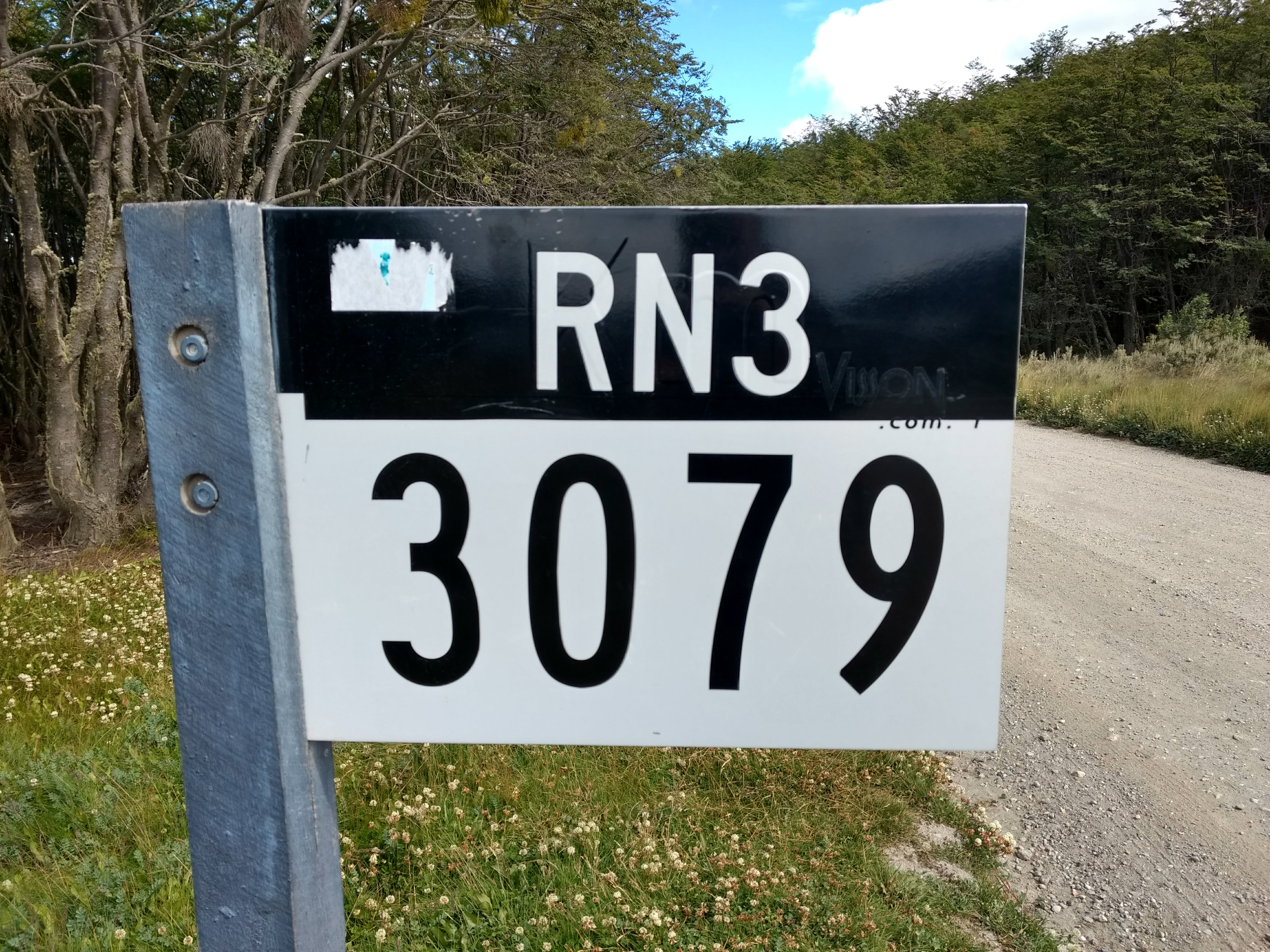
Last kilometer sign of National Route 3

Length: 363 kilometres (226 mi) (km 2696-km 3059).

- Hito 1 (No public access to Y-685 via Chilean border via left turn) (km 2696).
- Río Grande Department: access to San Sebastián (Chile) (km 2740), Río Grande (km 2818) and Tolhuin (km 2934).
- Ushuaia Department: Ushuaia (km 3036-3041).

== Tolls ==
In 1990 administration and maintenance of the most-travelled roads was transferred to private companies, with rights to collect tolls dividing the areas in "Corredores Viales" ("road corridors"). "Servicios de Mantenimiento de Carreteras" (Semacar) company, took charge of Corridor number 1, which includes Route 3 between km markers 19 and 677, in Buenos Aires Province, from the joining with Provincial Route 4 in San Justo to Bahía Blanca, with tolls collected in Cañuelas (km marker 78), Azul (km marker 263) and Tres Arroyos (km marker 523).,

In 2003 the concession contracts expired, which led to a modification of corridor numbers and a call for a new public bid. Corridor Vial number 1 was given to "Empresa Rutas al Sur" and runs from km marker 62 to 677 which corresponds to the crossing of Provincial Route 6 in Cañuelas until it joins National Route 252 in Grünbein.
