= Monte Aymond, Argentina =

Monte Aymond
- Village
- Location within Santa Cruz Province Location within Argentina
- Coordinates: 52°06′07″S 69°32′04″W
- Country: Argentina
- Province: Santa Cruz
- Department: Güer Aike
- Elevation: 164 m (538 ft)

Population (2001 Census)
  - Total: 22
- Time zone: UTC−3 (ART)
- CPA Base: V
- Area code: +54 2966
- Climate: Dfc

Monte Aymond is a village located in the Güer Aike Department of Santa Cruz Province of Argentina. It is located on National Route 3, 67 km (42 mi) from Río Gallegos and 8 km (5.0 mi) from the border crossing with Chile, dubbed Paso Integración Austral. The area has services such as telephony and shops, in addition to police assistance (Argentine National Gendarmerie and Carabineros de Chile) on both sides of the border.
