= Gil, Dorrego =

Place in Buenos Aires, Argentina

Gil
- Locality
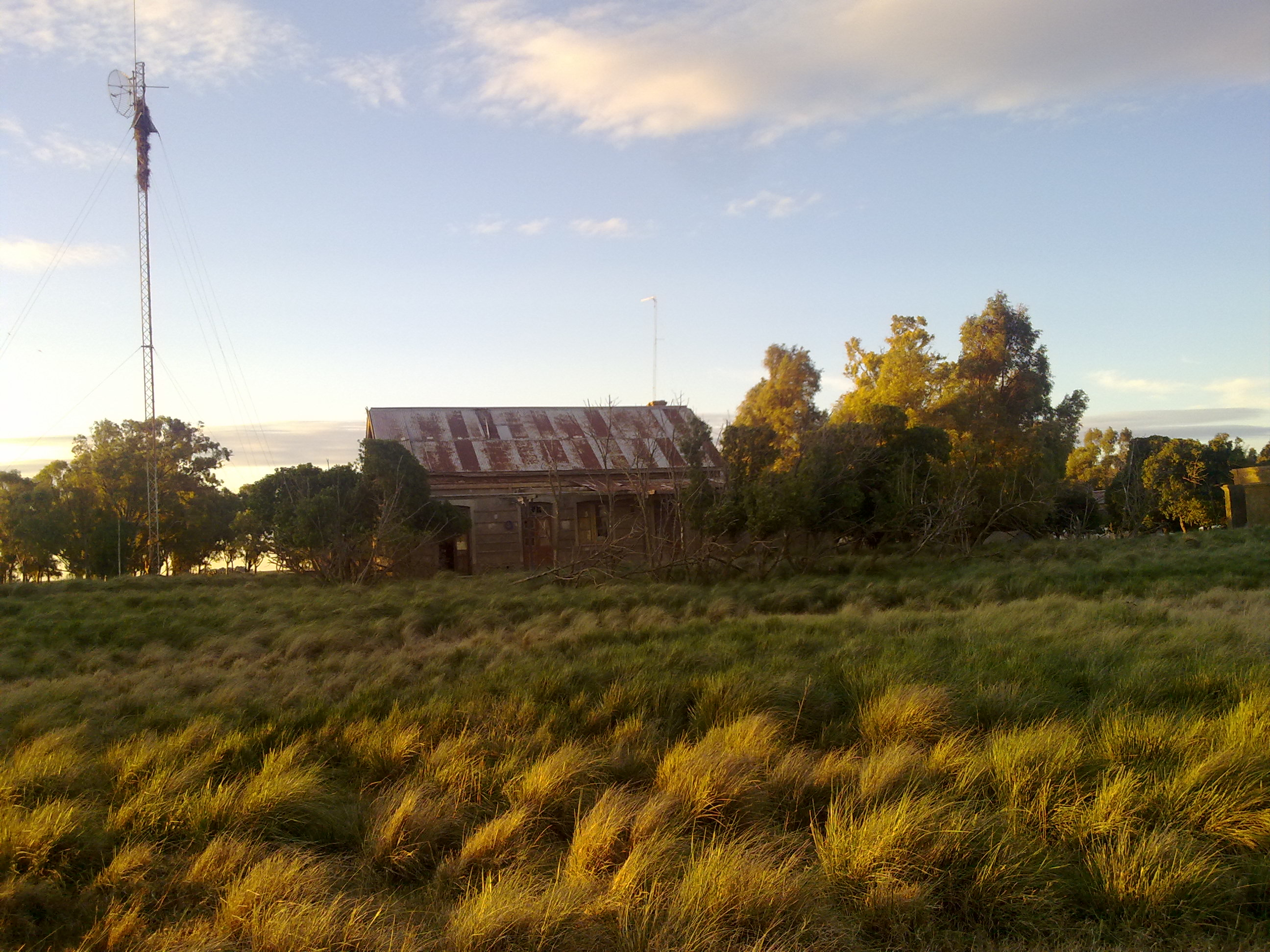

- Location in Argentina
- Coordinates: 38°47′32″S 60°54′18″W
- Country: Argentina
- Province: Buenos Aires
- Partido: Coronel Dorrego
- Founded: 1929
- Elevation: 52 m (171 ft)

Population (2010)
  - Total: Dispersed rural population

Language
- Time zone: UTC-03:00
- Postal code: 8151
- Telephone code: 02921

Gil is a rural area in Coronel Dorrego Partido, in the Province of Buenos Aires, Argentina.

== Location ==
It is located 40 km southeast of the city of Coronel Dorrego, via a rural road that branches off from National Route 3.

== History and population ==
The opening of the railway station of the Defferrari - Coronel Dorrego branch of the Buenos Aires Great Southern Railway in 1929 led to the formation of the town. The subsequent closure of railway services in 1961 caused a population decline.

In the Argentine censuses of 2001 and 2010, it was counted as a dispersed rural population.
