= Piedrabuena (disambiguation) =

Piedrabuena may refer to:

- Piedrabuena, a municipality in Ciudad Real, Castile-La Mancha, Spain
- Luis Piedrabuena (1833–1883), an Argentine Navy commander and lifeboat captain
- Comandante Luis Piedrabuena, a town in Santa Cruz Province, Argentina
- Piedrabuena Bay, a site in the Filchner Ice Shelf where the Argentine base Belgrano I was located, until 1980
- ARA Piedrabuena (D-29), an Argentine Navy destroyer of the 1970s and 1980s, (formerly USS Collett, an Allen M. Sumner class destroyer)
