= Laguna del Carbón =

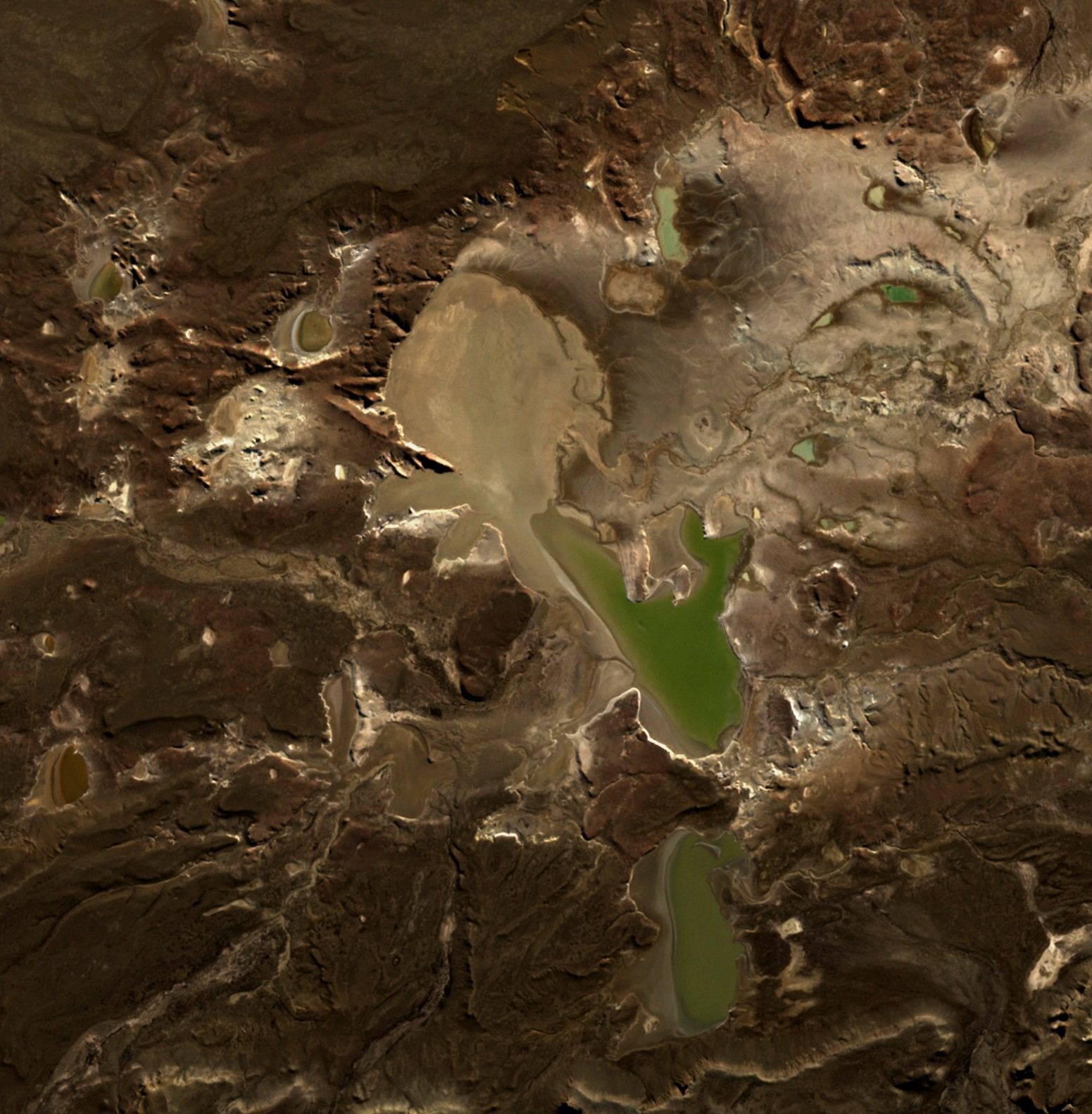

- Location in Santa Cruz Province and in Argentina Laguna del Carbón (Argentina)
- Interactive map of Laguna del Carbón
- Location: Corpen Aike Department, Santa Cruz Province, Argentina
- Coordinates: 49.5762°S 68.3514°W
- Lake type: Endorheic salt lake
- Primary outflows: Terminal (evaporation)
- Basin countries: Argentina
- Max. length: 5 km (3.1 mi)
- Max. width: 2 km (1.2 mi)
- Surface area: 9 km^{2} (3.5 sq mi)
- Surface elevation: −105 m (−344 ft)

Laguna del Carbón (Spanish for "coal lagoon") is a salt lake in Corpen Aike Department, Santa Cruz Province, Argentina. This salt lake is located 54 kilometres (34 miles) from Puerto San Julián, within the Gran Bajo de San Julián (Great San Julián Depression), an endorheic basin situated between the San Julian Bay and the Chico River. At 105 metres (344 ft) below sea level, Laguna del Carbón is the lowest point of the Americas, and the seventh-lowest point on Earth.

As in several other locations in Patagonia, dinosaur fossils have been found in the area.

== See also ==
- Badwater Basin – The lowest point in North America.
