= Puerto de Punta Quilla =

- Municipality and town
- Location within Santa Cruz Province Location within Argentina
- Coordinates: 50°6′56″S 68°24′52″W
- Country: Argentina
- Province: Santa Cruz Province
- Department: Corpen Aike Department
- Time zone: UTC−3 (ART)

Puerto de Punta Quilla is a town and municipality in Santa Cruz Province in southern Argentina.
