= Oriente, Buenos Aires =

Oriente
- Town
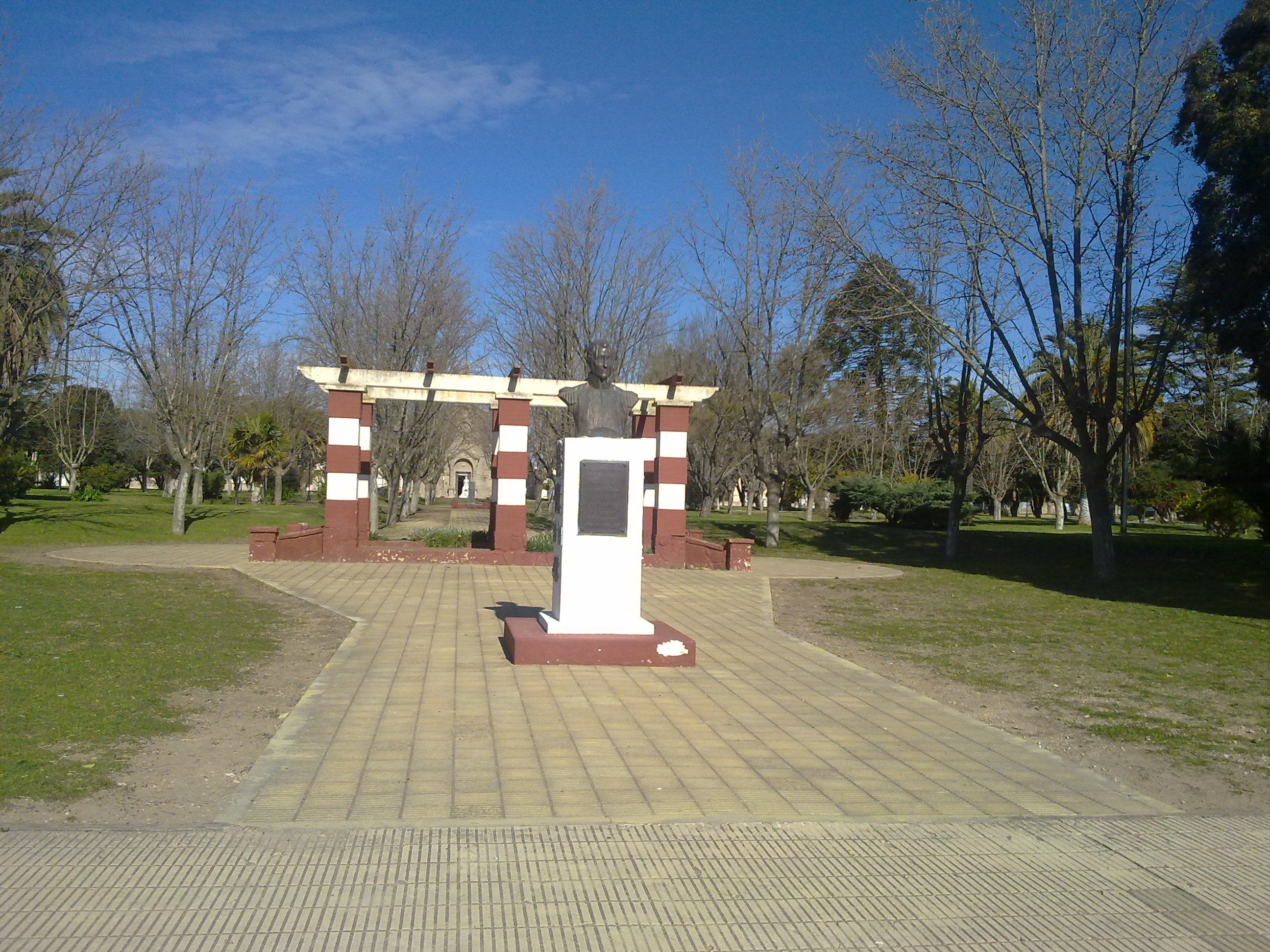

- Location within Buenos Aires Province
- Coordinates: 38°44′30″S 60°36′48″W
- Country: Argentina
- Province: Buenos Aires
- Partidos: Coronel Dorrego
- Established: October 10, 1911
- Elevation: 51 m (167 ft)

Population (2001 Census)
  - Total: 1,976
- Time zone: UTC−3 (ART)
- CPA Base: B 7509
- Climate: Dfc

Oriente is a town located in the eastern end of the Coronel Dorrego Partido in the province of Buenos Aires, Argentina.

== Geography ==
Oriente is located roughly 90 km (56 mi) from the regional seat of Coronel Dorrego.

== History ==
Oriente was founded on October 10, 1911, as an agricultural town. A railway station was also constructed in Oriente upon its founding. The town was founded following a public request, and a year later, in 1912, the first 79 lots in the town were auctioned for sale. Oriente was declared a city in 1975.

In the late 1910s, a large hydroelectric water plant, the Oriente Hydroelectric Power Plant, began operation. The project involved a 6 m (20 ft)-tall, 60 m (200 ft)-wide dam, with the goal of providing power to a nearby cement plant, with the excess power being given to, among other places, Oriente, which was 3 km (1.9 mi) away. The plant was damaged beyond repair by a flood in 1981.

== Economy ==
The economy of Oriente is primarily agriculture-based, due to the town's location on a fertile plain, part of the larger Pampas region. There is also a lesser focus on tourism.

== Population ==
According to INDEC, which collects population data for the country, the town had a population of 1,976 people as of the 2001 census.
