= Isla Pavón =

Island in Santa Cruz Province, Argentina

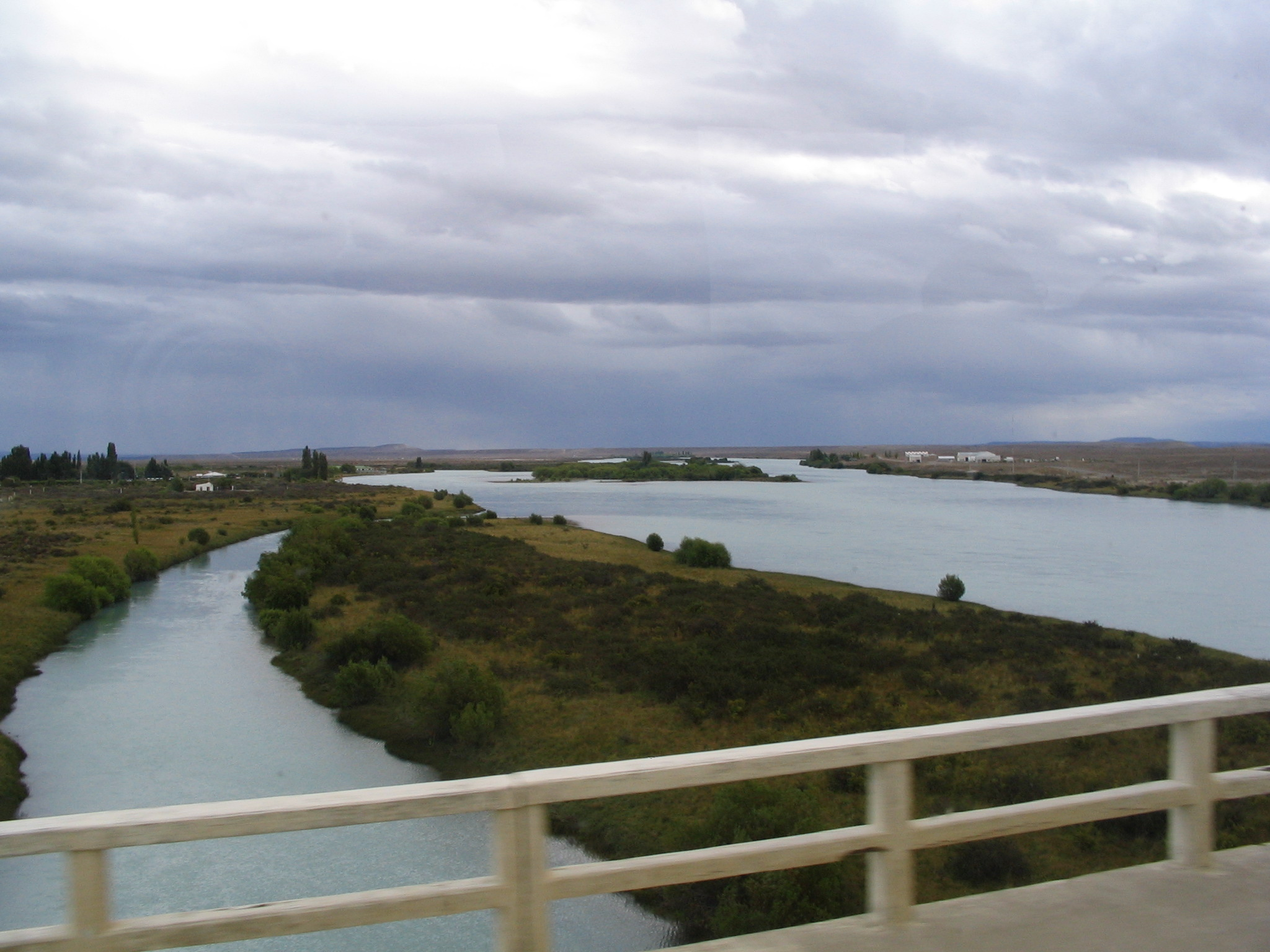
- Looking west over part of the island from the bridge crossing the river

- Location within Santa Cruz Province Location within Argentina
- Interactive map of Isla Pavón

Geography
- Coordinates: 50°00′09″S 68°56′00″W
- Adjacent to: Santa Cruz River

Administration
- Argentina
- Province: Santa Cruz
- Department: Corpen Aike

Isla Pavón (Pavon Island) is an island in the Santa Cruz River in the department of Corpen Aike in Santa Cruz province in southern Argentina. The town of Comandante Luis Piedrabuena is on the north bank of the river, just downstream from the island.

The English captain Pringle Stokes, who commanded HMS Beagle on her first voyage in 1828, entered the river and recorded the island, about 54 kilometres (34 mi) from the river's mouth. On the Beagle's second voyage in 1834, when Charles Darwin was part of the exploring party, Captain Robert FitzRoy called it "Middle Island". A trading post was established on the island by Luis Piedrabuena in 1859. In 1868 Piedrabuena was granted possession of the island by the government of President Bartolomé Mitre. In 1873 a 650-ton Chilean corvette, the Abtao, arrived at the tiny settlement on Pavón and tried to intimidate the settlers into leaving. Piedrabuena refused to yield.
