= Floridablanca =

Floridablanca may refer to:

- José Moñino, 1st Count of Floridablanca (1728–1808), Spanish statesman
- Floridablanca, Pampanga, a municipality in the Philippines, named after the Count of Floridablanca
- Floridablanca, Santander, municipality of Colombia
- Floridablanca (Patagonia), Spanish 18th century settlement, Patagonia
- Floridablanca, the ship of the mythical pirate José Gaspar (Gasparilla), supposedly commandeered from the navy of Spain
