= Nicolás Descalzi =

- Locality
- Location in Argentina
- Coordinates: 38°26′22.92″S 60°59′24″W
- Country: Argentina
- Province: Buenos Aires
- Partido: Coronel Dorrego
- Founded: 1929
- Elevation: 148 m (486 ft)

Language
- Time zone: UTC-03:00
- Postal code: 8151
- Telephone code: 02921

Nicolás Descalzi is a rural area in Coronel Dorrego Partido, in the Province of Buenos Aires, Argentina.

== Location ==
It is located 46 km northeast of the city of Coronel Dorrego through a rural road.

== History and population ==
The opening of the railway station of the Juan E. Barra - Coronel Dorrego Branch of the Buenos Aires Great Southern Railway in 1929 led to the formation of the town. The subsequent closure of the railway services in 1961 caused the population decline.

In the Argentine censuses of 2001 and 2010, it was counted as a dispersed rural population.

== Namesake ==
The area gets its name from Nicolás Descalzi, an Italian-Argentine explorer.
