= Chile Route 255 =

Highway in Chile

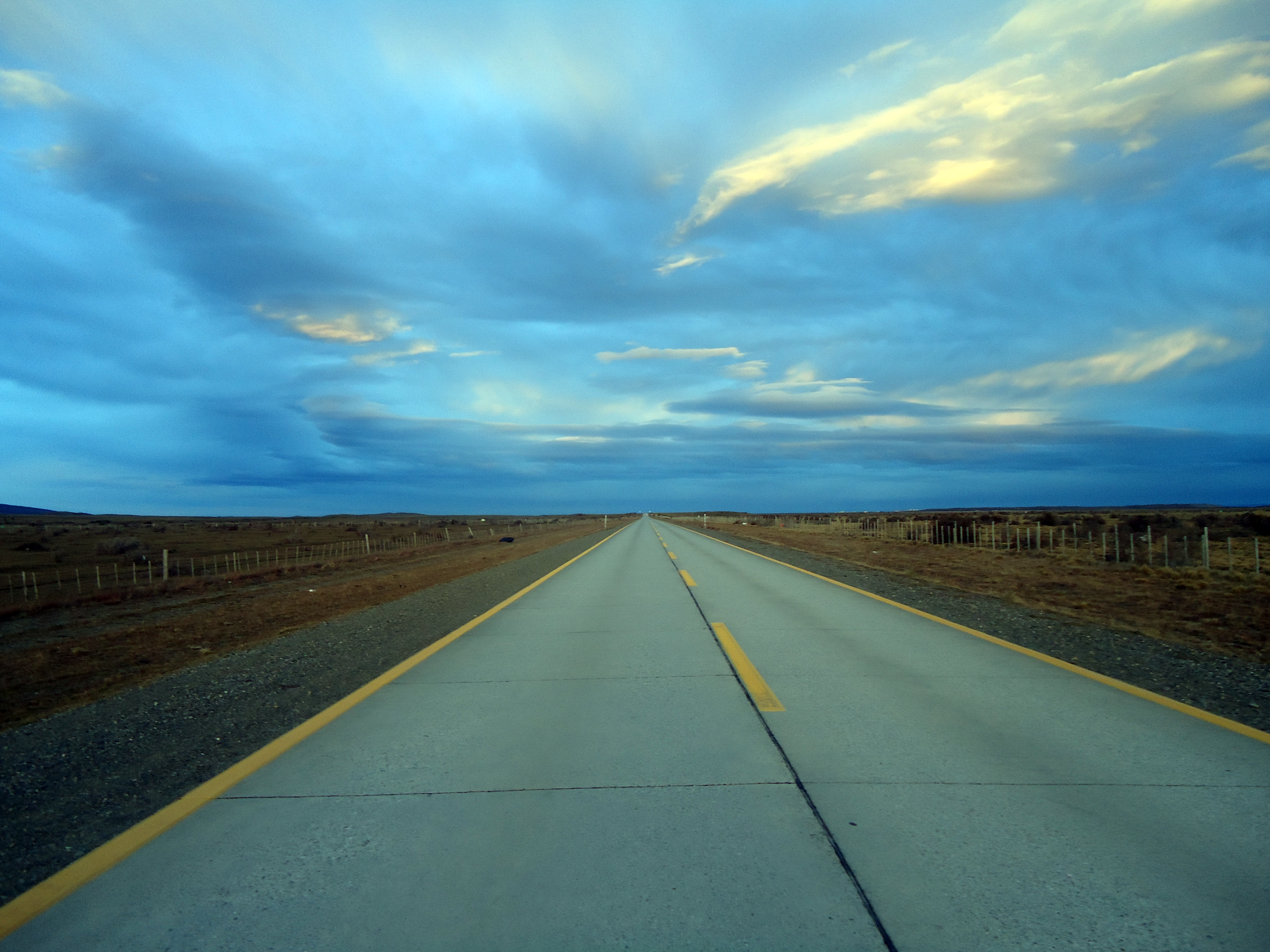
- View of Route 255

Route information
- Length: 142.12 km (88.31 mi)

Major junctions
- Northeast end: Paso Integración Austral
- Southwest end: Gobernardor Phillipi, Puntas Arenas

Location
- Country: Chile

Highway system
- Highways in Chile

Chile Route 255, known locally as Ruta CH-255, is a national route that is located in the region of Magallanes in southern Chile. The route begins at the Paso Integración Austral in Monte Aymond and ends at Gobernardor Phillipi in Puntas Arenas. In Argentina, the route continues as National Route 3.
