= Belgrano Lake =

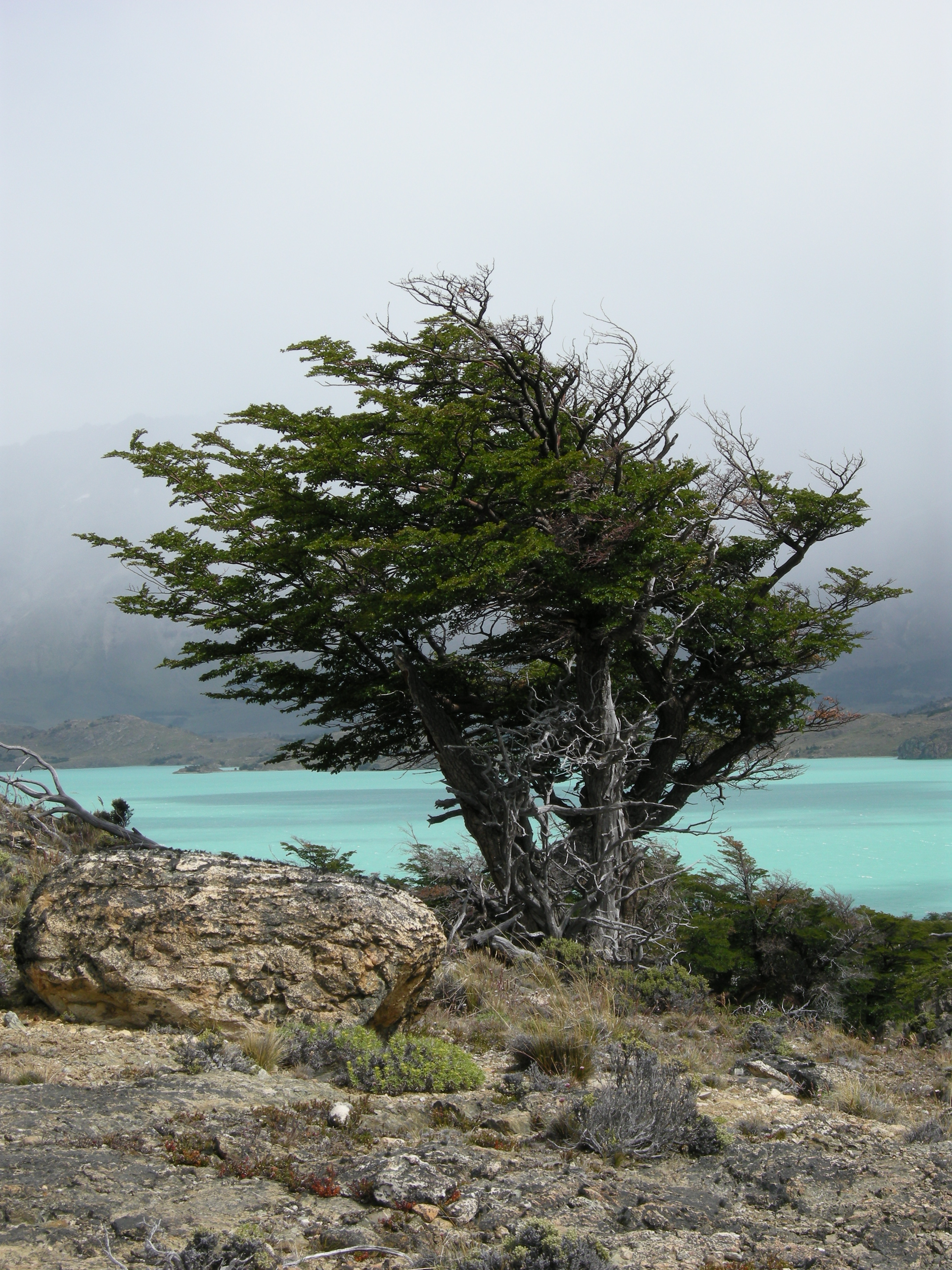

- Location within Argentina
- Location: Santa Cruz Province, Argentina
- Coordinates: 47°51′04″S 72°08′50″W
- Type: lake

Belgrano Lake (Spanish: Lago Belgrano) is a lake in the Santa Cruz Province of Patagonia, Argentina. It is located in Río Chico Department, in the west of the province. It is located in the Perito Moreno National Park.
