= Perito Moreno National Park =

National park in Santa Cruz Province, Argentina

- Parque Nacional Perito Moreno
- IUCN category II (national park)
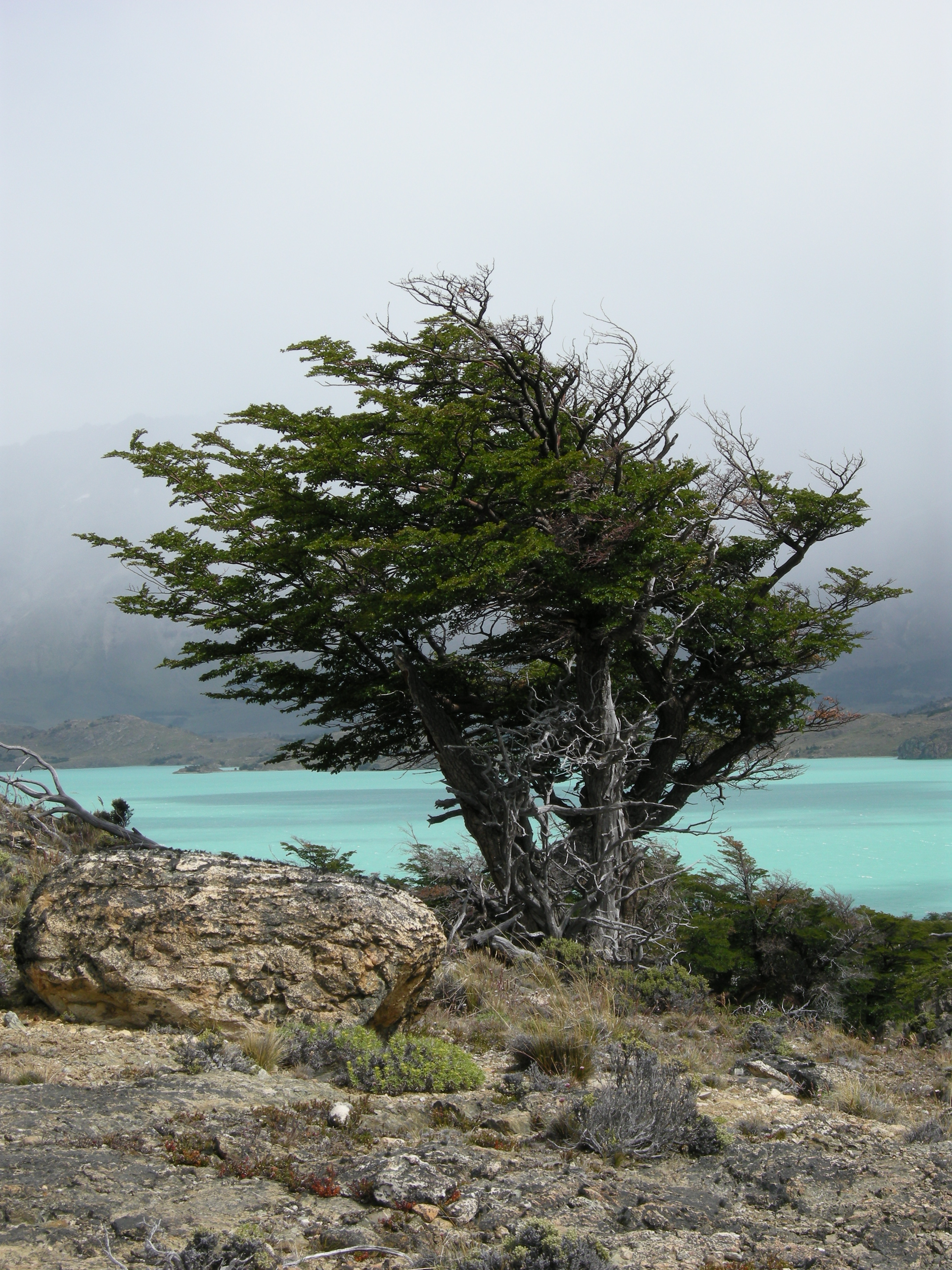
- Hypochaeris incana on the park's Belgrano peninsula

- Location within Argentina
- Location: Santa Cruz Province, Argentina
- Coordinates: 47°48′41″S 72°15′02″W
- Area: 126.830 ha (313.40 acres)
- Established: 1937

Perito Moreno National Park (Spanish: Parque Nacional Perito Moreno) is a national park in Argentina. It is located in the western region of Santa Cruz Province on the border with Chile. It has an area of 126,830 hectares (313,400 acres) of mountains and valleys at a height of 900 metres (3,000 ft) above sea level.

== History ==
The park is one of the oldest in Argentina having been established in 1937. It is named in honour of the explorer Francisco Moreno.

It was expanded in 2013 with a donation from Tompkins Conservation. The co-founder of Tompkins Conservation, Doug Tompkins first became intrigued by Perito Moreno National Park in 1968 as he passed by the area on a climbing expedition and saw Cerro San Lorenzo, Patagonia's second highest peak. He visited the park in 1991 with friends Yvon Chouinard and Rick Ridgeway and the following year negotiated the purchase of roughly 15,000 hectares (37,000 acres) of private land within the park, which his organization managed as wildlife habitat and allowed to rewild. That tract was donated to the national parks administration in 2013.

== Geography ==
=== Climate ===
The park has a cold climate ranging from a wet climate in the west to a dry one in the east. The park experiences strong and persistent westerly winds throughout the year. Mean annual rainfall ranges from 3,000 mm (120 in) in the west to 400 mm (16 in) in the east. Temperatures can fall below −25 °C (−13.0 °F) in winter. During summer, the mean temperature is around 15 °C (59.0 °F). Snowfalls can occur in every month.

Climate data for Paso del Águila (1937–1944)
Month	Jan	Feb	Mar	Apr	May	Jun	Jul	Aug	Sep	Oct	Nov	Dec	Year
Record high °C (°F)	28.3 (82.9)	26.5 (79.7)	23.8 (74.8)	18.4 (65.1)	16.4 (61.5)	11.3 (52.3)	10.5 (50.9)	13.4 (56.1)	16.0 (60.8)	18.5 (65.3)	21.8 (71.2)	25.0 (77.0)	28.3 (82.9)
Mean daily maximum °C (°F)	18.0 (64.4)	16.6 (61.9)	14.0 (57.2)	10.3 (50.5)	5.2 (41.4)	1.3 (34.3)	1.4 (34.5)	2.2 (36.0)	6.0 (42.8)	10.2 (50.4)	13.6 (56.5)	15.8 (60.4)	9.6 (49.3)
Daily mean °C (°F)	11.3 (52.3)	10.3 (50.5)	8.6 (47.5)	4.5 (40.1)	0.8 (33.4)	−3.0 (26.6)	−2.9 (26.8)	−2.4 (27.7)	1.5 (34.7)	4.9 (40.8)	7.7 (45.9)	9.7 (49.5)	4.3 (39.7)
Mean daily minimum °C (°F)	4.8 (40.6)	4.1 (39.4)	2.3 (36.1)	−0.2 (31.6)	−3.6 (25.5)	−7.2 (19.0)	−7.1 (19.2)	−6.4 (20.5)	−2.9 (26.8)	0.2 (32.4)	1.9 (35.4)	3.9 (39.0)	−0.9 (30.4)
Record low °C (°F)	−7.0 (19.4)	−6.4 (20.5)	−8.0 (17.6)	−9.0 (15.8)	−12.0 (10.4)	−19.0 (−2.2)	−17.5 (0.5)	−17.5 (0.5)	−11.6 (11.1)	−8.5 (16.7)	−8.0 (17.6)	−6.0 (21.2)	−19.0 (−2.2)
Average precipitation mm (inches)	13 (0.5)	24 (0.9)	27 (1.1)	37 (1.5)	53 (2.1)	40 (1.6)	13 (0.5)	12 (0.5)	10 (0.4)	31 (1.2)	20 (0.8)	24 (0.9)	304 (12.0)
Source: Secretaría de Aeronáutica (Servicio Meteorológico Nacional)

== Terrain ==
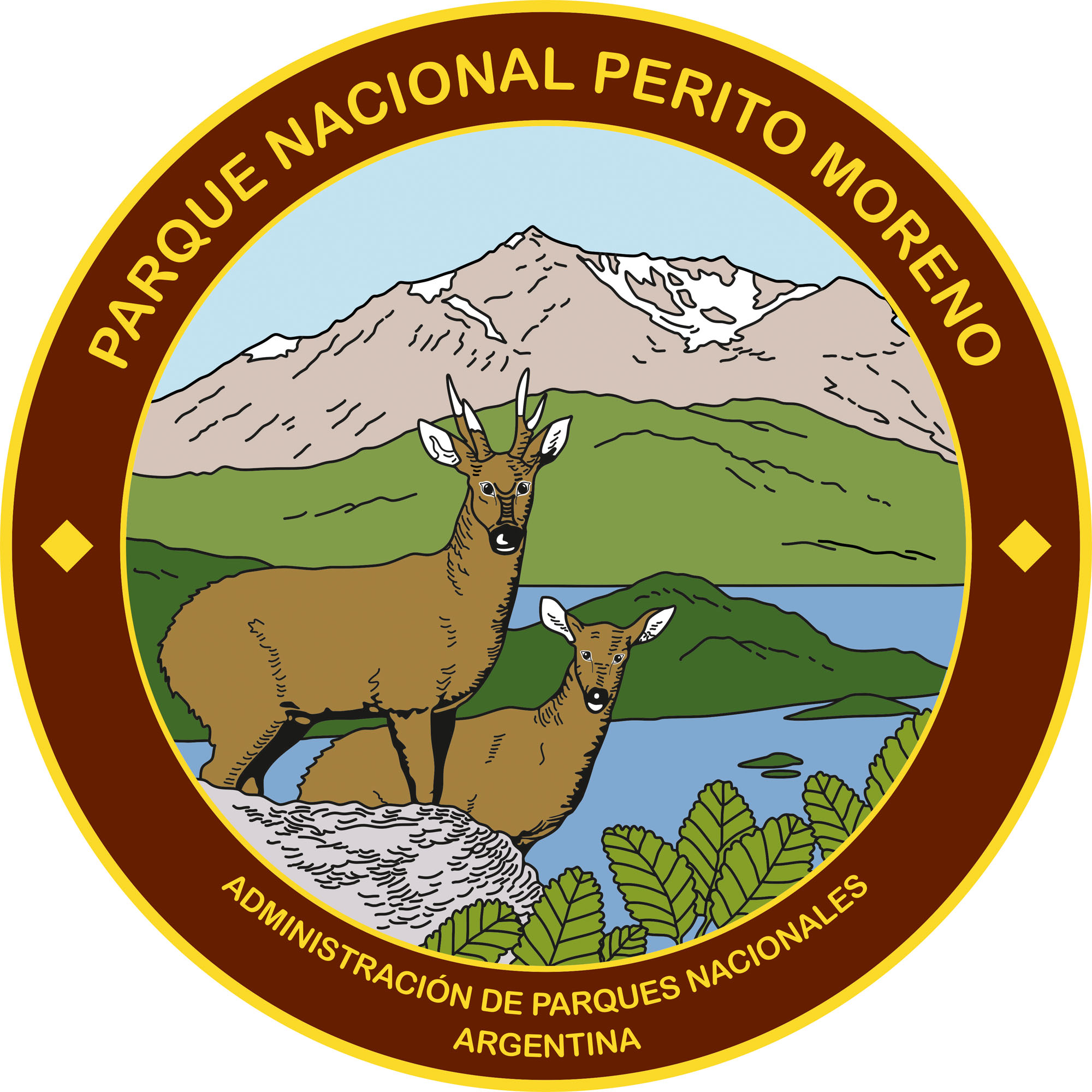
Park logo

The park is located at around 900 metres (3,000 ft) above sea level, which is the height at which the valleys are inhabited. A series of mountain chains traverse the park from east to west and from north to south, resembling an imposing amphitheater. Inside the protected area the highest peak is cerro Heros (Heros hill) at 2,770 metres (9,090 ft). Nearby, but outside the boundary of the park lies the imposing cerro San Lorenzo (Monte San Lorenzo) which reaches 3,707 metres (12,162 ft) in height, which is generally covered by clouds. To the north of the lake Belgrano the cerro Leon (Lion hill) reaches 1,380 metres (4,530 ft) and to the east of the same lake, the Gorra de Vasco (Basque peak) reaches 1,140 metres (3,740 ft). Inside the Park the Sierra Colorada (Red plain) is distinguished, of some 1,200 metres (3,900 ft), whose western slope is very abrupt, and whose coloring gives its name.

=== Hydrography ===
Two main basins are distinguished, one on the Pacific side and the other on the Atlantic. They comprise eight lakes including Belgrano Lake along with numerous rivers and streams.

The Pacific basin feeds into the lago Mogote (lake Mogote), which then flows into lago Volcán (lake Volcano).

The Atlantic basin features lago Burmeister (lake Burmeister) at 932 metres (3,058 ft). The many rivers in the basin traverse the Santa Cruz province and eventually reach the Atlantic to the east.

== Flora and fauna ==
Of the 24 species of mammal that can be found in the park the most exotic and endangered species is the small wildcat gato pajero (Lynchailurus pajeros). Another small wildcat found within the park is the gato huiña (Oncifelis guigna) which is also endangered.

Other species include guanaco, puma (cougar), Patagonian fox, dwarf armadillo, ferret, skunk, tuco-tuco and south Andean deer.

A hundred and fifteen species of bird have been recorded in the park, including peregrine falcon, hooded grebe, flamingo, andean goose, Podiceps, and several species of ducks, falcons and eagles.
