= Puerto Santa Cruz =

Puerto Santa Cruz Puerto Santa Cruz
- Municipality and town
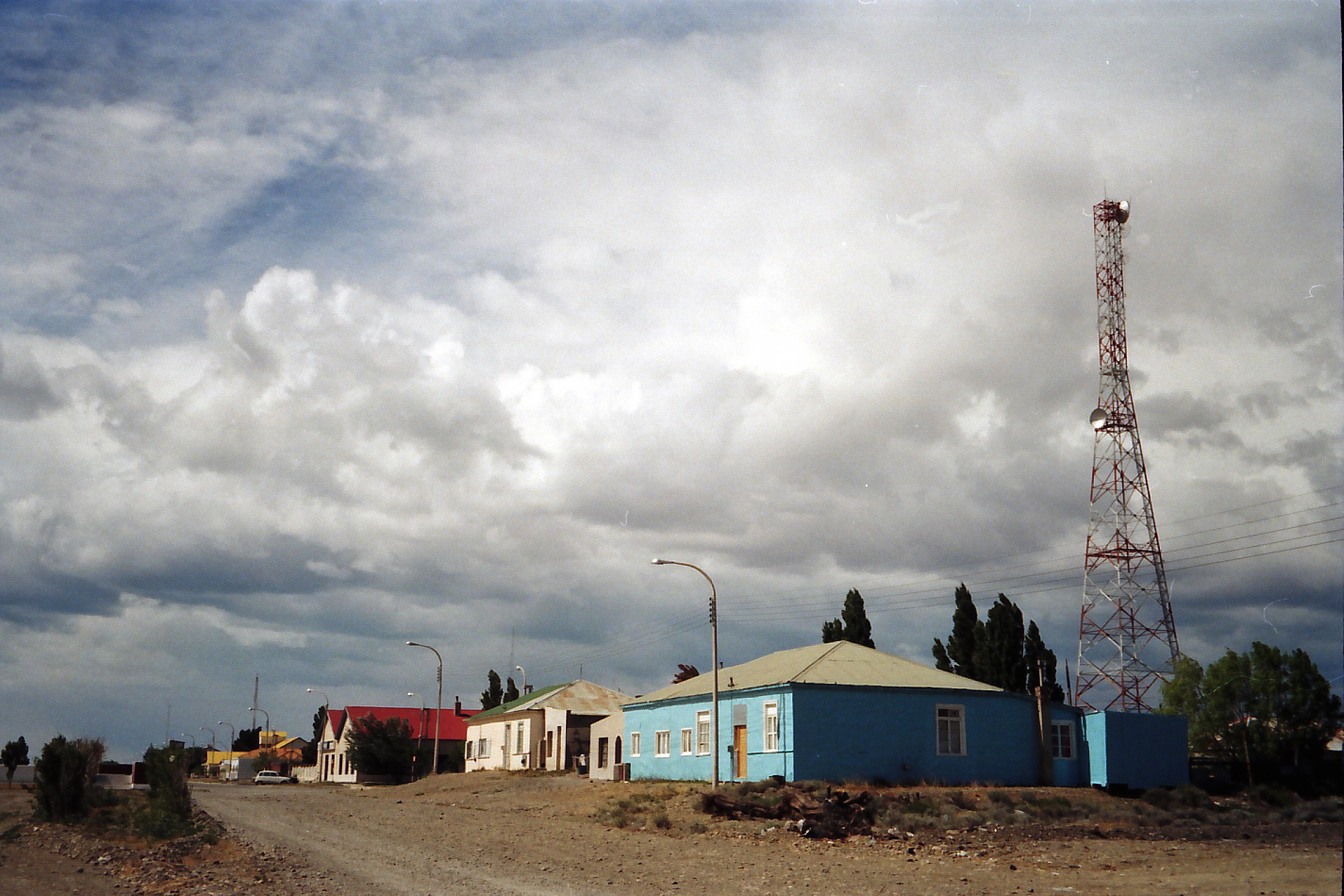
- Puerto Santa Cruz

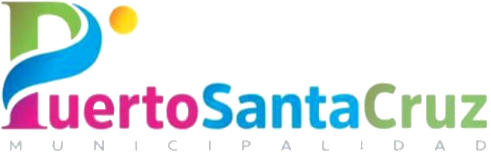
- Seal

- Location of Puerto Santa Cruz in Argentina Puerto Santa Cruz (Argentina)
- Coordinates: 50°01′00″S 68°31′00″W
- Country: Argentina
- Province: Santa Cruz
- Department: Corpen Aike Department
- Established: 12 December 1878 1

Government
  - Intendant: Juan Manuel Bórquez (SER Santa Cruz)

Population (2022 Census)
  - Total: 5,390
- Time zone: UTC−3 (ART)
- Postal codes in Argentina: 9300
- Area code: 02962
- Climate: BSk

Puerto Santa Cruz is a town and municipality in Santa Cruz Province in southern Argentina. It lies near the Atlantic coast on the southwestern bank of the estuary of Santa Cruz River. It is the second oldest city in the province, being founded in 1878. It was the capital of the Santa Cruz National Territory until Río Gallegos took over the position in 1888. The town is a local centre for sheep and cattle farming. The presence of fresh water in an otherwise semi-arid environment allows for orchards and a local horticulture.

It is located at latitude 50°S and is an antipode of Prague (located at latitude 50°N).

== Geography ==
=== Climate ===
Climate data for Puerto Santa Cruz (1901–1960, extremes 1901–present (Note: The record highs and lows are based on the Secretaria de Mineria link for the period 1901–1960 while records beyond 1961 come from the Servicio Meteorológico Nacional link since it only covers from 1961–present. When these 2 sources are used together, the record highs and lows are from the period 1901–present))
Month	Jan	Feb	Mar	Apr	May	Jun	Jul	Aug	Sep	Oct	Nov	Dec	Year
Record high °C (°F)	36.5 (97.7)	37.0 (98.6)	32.6 (90.7)	27.7 (81.9)	24.4 (75.9)	17.3 (63.1)	17.0 (62.6)	20.0 (68.0)	26.7 (80.1)	31.8 (89.2)	32.4 (90.3)	34.9 (94.8)	37.0 (98.6)
Mean daily maximum °C (°F)	21.1 (70.0)	21.0 (69.8)	18.6 (65.5)	14.4 (57.9)	9.1 (48.4)	5.9 (42.6)	5.9 (42.6)	8.1 (46.6)	11.8 (53.2)	16.1 (61.0)	18.4 (65.1)	20.9 (69.6)	14.3 (57.7)
Daily mean °C (°F)	14.3 (57.7)	14.1 (57.4)	12.0 (53.6)	8.7 (47.7)	4.7 (40.5)	2.0 (35.6)	2.2 (36.0)	3.4 (38.1)	6.1 (43.0)	9.2 (48.6)	11.4 (52.5)	13.1 (55.6)	8.4 (47.1)
Mean daily minimum °C (°F)	8.8 (47.8)	8.3 (46.9)	7.1 (44.8)	3.6 (38.5)	0.8 (33.4)	−1.8 (28.8)	−1.5 (29.3)	−0.4 (31.3)	1.2 (34.2)	3.7 (38.7)	6.9 (44.4)	7.9 (46.2)	3.7 (38.7)
Record low °C (°F)	−0.5 (31.1)	−3.8 (25.2)	−4.0 (24.8)	−8.0 (17.6)	−12.1 (10.2)	−17.0 (1.4)	−17.9 (−0.2)	−17.0 (1.4)	−7.4 (18.7)	−6.6 (20.1)	−3.4 (25.9)	−1.8 (28.8)	−17.9 (−0.2)
Average precipitation mm (inches)	21.1 (0.83)	12.7 (0.50)	18.8 (0.74)	12.5 (0.49)	21.3 (0.84)	14.7 (0.58)	14.2 (0.56)	14.0 (0.55)	12.7 (0.50)	10.2 (0.40)	13.0 (0.51)	16.6 (0.65)	181.8 (7.16)
Average relative humidity (%)	53.0	55.0	57.3	64.3	71.7	75.7	76.3	69.7	64.0	55.3	52.0	50.7	62.1
Mean monthly sunshine hours	250	215	191	148	116	99	112	148	158	208	220	232	2,095
Percentage possible sunshine	51	54	50	47	42	41	42	48	45	49	48	46	47
Source 1: Secretaria de Mineria, Servicio Meteorológico Nacional (extremes 1961–present)
Source 2: FAO (sun only)
