= SER Santa Cruz =

Argentine political party

SER Santa Cruz Somos Energía para Renovar Santa Cruz
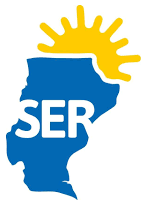
- Leader: Claudio Vidal
- Founded: 2019; 7 years ago
- Ideology: Regionalism; Peronism
- Political position: Center
- National affiliation: Frente de Todos (2019–2021); Por Santa Cruz (2023–present)
- Deputies (Santa Cruz seats): 2 / 5
- Senators (Santa Cruz seats): 1 / 3
- Seats in the Santa Cruz Legislature: 11 / 24

Website
- Official website

We Are Energy to Renew Santa Cruz (Spanish: Somos Energía para Renovar Santa Cruz), better known by its short name, SER Santa Cruz (also meaning "Being Santa Cruz") is a provincial political party in the Santa Cruz Province of Argentina. It was founded in 2019 by oil workers' union leader Claudio Vidal, in opposition to then-governor of Santa Cruz, Alicia Kirchner.

It is a regionalist (provincialist) and peronist party in ideology.

Originally part of the Frente de Todos (FDT) coalition, ahead of the 2021 legislative election SER split in order to compete against the FDT for representation in the Argentine National Congress. It found support in the oil-producing regions of the province. In the 2023 provincial elections, Vidal was elected governor of Santa Cruz.
