= Floridablanca (Patagonia) =

Coordinates: 49°16′38″S 67°51′22″W

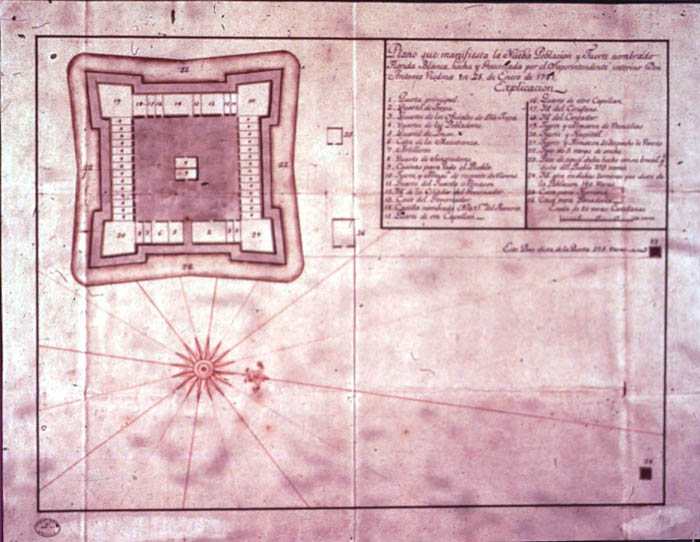
Sketch of Floridablanca

The Spanish settlement Nueva Colonia y Fuerte de Floridablanca was established in San Julian Bay in 1780 and abandoned four years later due to scurvy. The settlement was deliberately destroyed so the facilities could not be used by foreign powers.

At present, this settlement is an archaeological site near Port San Julian, Santa Cruz Province, Argentina.

== History ==
A little village called Nueva Colonia y Fuerte de Floridablanca was founded in the frame of the colonisation of the Patagonian Atlantic coast developed by Charles III King of Spain in the late 18th century. This was part of a strategic plan of the Spanish crown to settle those parts of the empire still unexplored or unpopulated. The settlement consisted of approximately 150 people. The colony was named after the Count of Florida-Blanca, then chief minister of the crown.

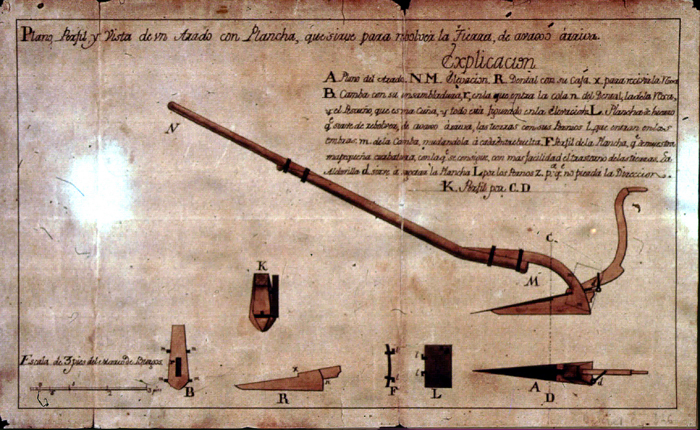
A plow and other tools depicted for their use in Spanish colonies in Patagonia

In Floridablanca the modern ideas of the Spanish Enlightenment were put in place. The concepts of agriculture and family were the centre of the discourse for the colony. Agriculture was selected as the main means of support for the settlement. An attempt to guarantee agricultural development through building a society of farming families tied to the land. Households were seen as the essential unit of society and the basic elements needed for their maintenance was determined by the Spanish Crown (i.e., lodging, food, health, land, seeds and production means).

== Historical archaeology ==
Floridablanca has become the object of the research project "Archaeology and History at the Spanish colony of Floridablanca (Patagonia, 18th century)" headed by Dr. María Ximena Senatore from the Instituto Multidisciplinario de Historia y Ciencias Humanas, CONICET and University of Buenos Aires, Argentina.

== See also ==
- Nombre de Jesús (Patagonia)
- Carmen de Patagones
