= Coronel Dorrego Partido =

Coronel Dorrego Partido de Coronel Dorrego
- Department
- Flag

- location of Coronel Dorrego Partido in Buenos Aires Province
- Coordinates: 38°43′S 61°17′W
- Country: Argentina
- Established: December 29, 1890
- Founder: Máximo Paz
- Seat: Coronel Dorrego

Government
  - Intendant: Juan Carlos Chalde (UCR)

Area
  - Total: 5,818 km^{2} (2,246 sq mi)

Population
  - Total: 16,522
  - Density: 2.840/km^{2} (7.355/sq mi)
- Demonym: dorregense
- Postal Code: B8150
- IFAM: BUE030
- Area Code: 02921
- Patron saint: Inmaculada Concepción de María
- Website: Dorrego

Coronel Dorrego Partido is a partido on the southern coast of Buenos Aires Province in Argentina.

The provincial subdivision has a population of about 16,500 inhabitants in an area of 5,818 km^{2} (2,246 sq mi), and its capital city is Coronel Dorrego, which is around 628 km (390 mi) from Buenos Aires.

== Economy ==
The economy of Coronel Dorrego Partido is dominated by agriculture. The mainstays of agricultural production are cereals, dairy products, and beef.

== Tourism ==
Marisol is a coastal resort which is popular with tourists from Gran Buenos Aires.

== Sport ==
- Club Atlético Ferroviario
- Independiente de Coronel Dorrego
- Club Social y Deportivo San Martín
- Club Social

== Settlements ==
- Aparicio
- Barrio Maritimo
- Coronel Dorrego
- El Perdido
- El Zorro
- Faro
- Irene
- Marisol
- Oriente
- San Román
- Calvo
- Gil
- Nicolás Descalzi
- Paraje La Gloria
- Zubiaurre
