= Paso Integración Austral =

Paso Integración Austral is a border crossing in southern Patagonia connecting Chile's Magallanes Region with Argentina's Santa Cruz Province. The neares city in the Chilean side is Punta Arenas. During summer the crossing is open day-round, while in winter it opens at 8 AM and closes at 22 PM. The border crossing lies 163 m a.s.l.
