= Luis Piedrabuena =

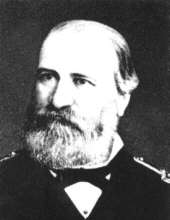
- Capitán Luis Piedrabuena
- Born: 24 August 1833; Carmen de Patagones, Buenos Aires Province
- Died: 10 August 1883 (aged 49); Buenos Aires
- Occupation: Sailor
- Known for: Southern explorations
- Spouse: Julia Dufour
- Children: Luis, Ana, María, Celestina, Julia, Elvira

Luis Piedrabuena (Spanish pronunciation: [lwis pjeðɾaˈβwena]; 24 August 1833 - 10 August 1883) was an Argentine sailor whose actions in southern Argentina consolidated national sovereignty at a time when these lands were virtually uninhabited and were not protected by the state. His biographers consider him one of the most important heroes of Patagonia. Piedrabuena reached the naval rank of Naval Lieutenant Colonel, equivalent to Commander. Today he is commonly called Commander Piedrabuena. (Note: Some people write his name as "Piedra Buena" rather than "Piedrabuena". The second form is the one used in all official documents, and is the way he signed his name)

== Childhood ==
Luis Piedrabuena was born in the port of Carmen de Patagones, Buenos Aires Province, on 24 August 1833. He was born in a large colonial house with large bricks, window grilles and a Spanish-style tile roof. It was located at the foot of the ravine that was crowned by a fort in those days, and today by the parish church. From a very early age he was attracted by the sea.

His childhood relationship with three seamen helped him to follow a life at sea. The first was Captain Lemon, an American whaler who sailed, while very young, between Patagones and Buenos Aires. The second was an old friend of his father, the captain and former privateer James Harris who put Luis up at his home in Buenos Aires, where he enrolled in a primary school and later attend a high school specializing in nautical subjects. Returning to Patagones, five years later, he continued to pilot boats and managed to build his own cutter.

In 1847 another American whaler, John E. Davison, touched at Patagones. He was under Captain W. Smiley, who was leading an expedition in the South Atlantic. Luis's father entrusted him at the age of 15 to this sailor for seafaring instruction. He sailed with the whaler from Patagones on 23 July 1847, heading for the Antarctic. On that voyage he reached the latitude of 68° South, so Piedrabuena can be considered the first Argentine to have entered the Antarctic. The hardship of ocean voyaging in the cold and rough seas prepared him for the large enterprises in which he would participate in the future.

== Chronology of his life at sea ==
Piedrabuena accompanied Captain W. Smiley's whaling and sealing expedition in 1848, picking up knowledge of sealing, and learning the geography of the straits and how to navigate in them. In 1848, with his own schooner, Piedrabuena touched at the Falkland Islands to load groceries and then continued to Cape Horn, reaching the Antarctic continent whaling grounds, and then returned to his hometown Carmen de Patagones. In 1849 Piedrabuena sailed from the port of Montevideo to Tierra del Fuego as an officer to supply the English missionaries. Offshore from Isla de los Estados (Staten Island) he rescued fourteen shipwrecked sailors. Piedrabuena displayed characteristic solidarity and courage as a seaman in the rescue. In 1850 he was first officer of the schooner "Zerabia", taking sheep and cattle to the Falkland Islands. He reached Antarctica again. He explored the Fuegian channels where he met Tehuelche people, in whom he tried to instill a sense of the Fatherland.

In 1854 Piedrabuena again helped 24 sailors shipwrecked by a storm. In 1855, in command of the schooner "Manuelita" provided by Smiley, in Punta Ninfas he rescued the crew of the American whaling boat "Dolphin" from death. In 1859 he explored the Santa Cruz River and reached an island that he called Isla Pavón, where he was assigned by the government to install a trading post. He also set up a post in Puerto Cook, Isla de los Estados, offshore from Tierra del Fuego. In 1860 he armed his own ship, the schooner "Nancy", to defend the territory and the southern coasts of Patagonia, while still saving lives. In 1862 he established a small shelter, San Juan de Salvamento, on the Isla de los Estados, as a refuge for shipwrecked sailors and to establish Argentine sovereignty. In 1863 he arrived in the Bay of San Gregorio in the Strait of Magellan, and befriended chief Biguá. He took him to Buenos Aires and got the authorities to designate him "Chief of San Gregorio".

On 2 December 1864 the National Government gave him the title of "unpaid honorary captain" to defend Argentine sovereignty in Patagonia. Over the years Piedrabuena continued his work, sometimes abandoning his business to help castaways, and teaching the Aboriginals that they are children of Argentina whose sovereignty they must defend. He made many voyages on the coasts of Patagonia, Tierra del Fuego and Falklands. In 1868 the government awarded the first grants of land in the South, giving Pavón and Los Estados Islands to Piedrabuena. That year he married Julia Dufour, who was to accompany him on several of his voyages.

In 1873 a 650-ton Chilean corvette, the Abtao, arrived at the tiny settlement on Pavón and tried to intimidate the settlers into leaving. Piedrabuena refused to yield. In March 1873, traveling with the schooner "Spore" to Isla de los Estados he was surprised by a terrible storm that drove the ship onto the rocks and wrecked it. From the remains of the ship with much difficulty he built the small cutter "Luisito", sailing it to Punta Arenas. From here he returned to Staten Island, saving the shipwrecked vessels "Eagle" and "Dr. Hanson". Germany recognized the act of courage and sent a magnificent telescope to Piedrabuena in a case whose plaque read: "We, William, by the Grace of God Emperor of Germany and King of Prussia: We consider this case a memento of gratitude to Captain D. Luis Piedrabuena of the Argentine ship "Luisito", for services rendered in the rescue of the crew of Dr. Hanson wrecked in October 1874."

On 17 April 1878 the government gives him the title of sergeant with the rank of lieutenant colonel. In 1882, he participated with the "Cape Horn" in the scientific expedition to southern Patagonia of the Italian sailor Giacomo Bove. The journey lasted eight months, and used the isla de los Estados, which the government had granted to Piedrabuena, as the main observation center. On 8 November 1882 Julio Argentino Roca, President of Argentine, gave him the effective rank of lieutenant colonel in the Navy.

== Personal life ==
On 2 August 1868 he married Julia Dufour, who accompanied him on several of his voyages. She was the daughter of a Frenchman who served in the Rio de la Plata. That same year, in October, they both departed on a long voyage to the Patagonian seas, during which they visited Isla de los Estados where they landed in the shelter that the Commander had built in 1862 for those who were shipwrecked in those lonely shores. A few days later they arrived at the Pavón island, at the time owned by Piedrabuena. The couple had five children: Luis, Ana, Maria Celestina and Julia Elvira and another son also named Luis, born after the death of his brother of the same name and of Julia Elvira.

Julia Dufour died on 6 August 1878 in Buenos Aires, while her husband was at sea. She had helped him and shared his ideals, and was the first white woman to land in Santa Cruz Province. The settlement of Julia Dufour in Santa Cruz province is named in her honor.

Commander Luis Piedrabuena died on 10 August 1883 at 20:45 hours in 50 Tucumán Street in Buenos Aires. According to Admiral Laurio Destefani "wordless pain hit the men of the Navy: the greatest sailor of all sailors was gone." Bartolomé Mitre writing in La Nación said: "The passion of his life was to guarantee the country's vast territories of southern Argentina ... for a long time it was defended only by his small ship."

Luis Piedrabuena is buried in La Recoleta Cemetery in Buenos Aires. The town of Comandante Luis Piedrabuena is named in his honor. An avenue and a housing complex in the impoverished neighborhood of Villa Lugano in the Autonomous City of Buenos Aires were also named after him. Some of the streets within the housing complex were named after the ships he commanded. As an ambassador 'sui generis' he was given only verbal instructions, and was paid by honors and awards that cost nothing. His name appears in only four official decrees. He wrote several reports submitted to the National Government, and established friendly relations with the tribes of Patagonia, in whom he tried in various ways to instill the feeling of nationality. In many forays into the South Seas he saved hundreds of shipwrecks for which he was the subject of honors and awards by the European Government. The Government of his country prized his meritorious services, awarded him the rank of Captain and later Honorary Lieutenant Colonel of the Navy, and put him in command of the Corvette "Cabo de Hornos".

== Ships he commanded ==
- Goleta Manuelita
- Bergantín Nancy (later renamed Espora)
- Cúter Luisito (named after his second son, who died very young)
- Goleta Santa Cruz
- Goleta Cabo de Hornos
