= Comandante Luis Piedrabuena =

Town in Santa Cruz Province, Argentina

Coordinates: 49.983°S 68.910°W

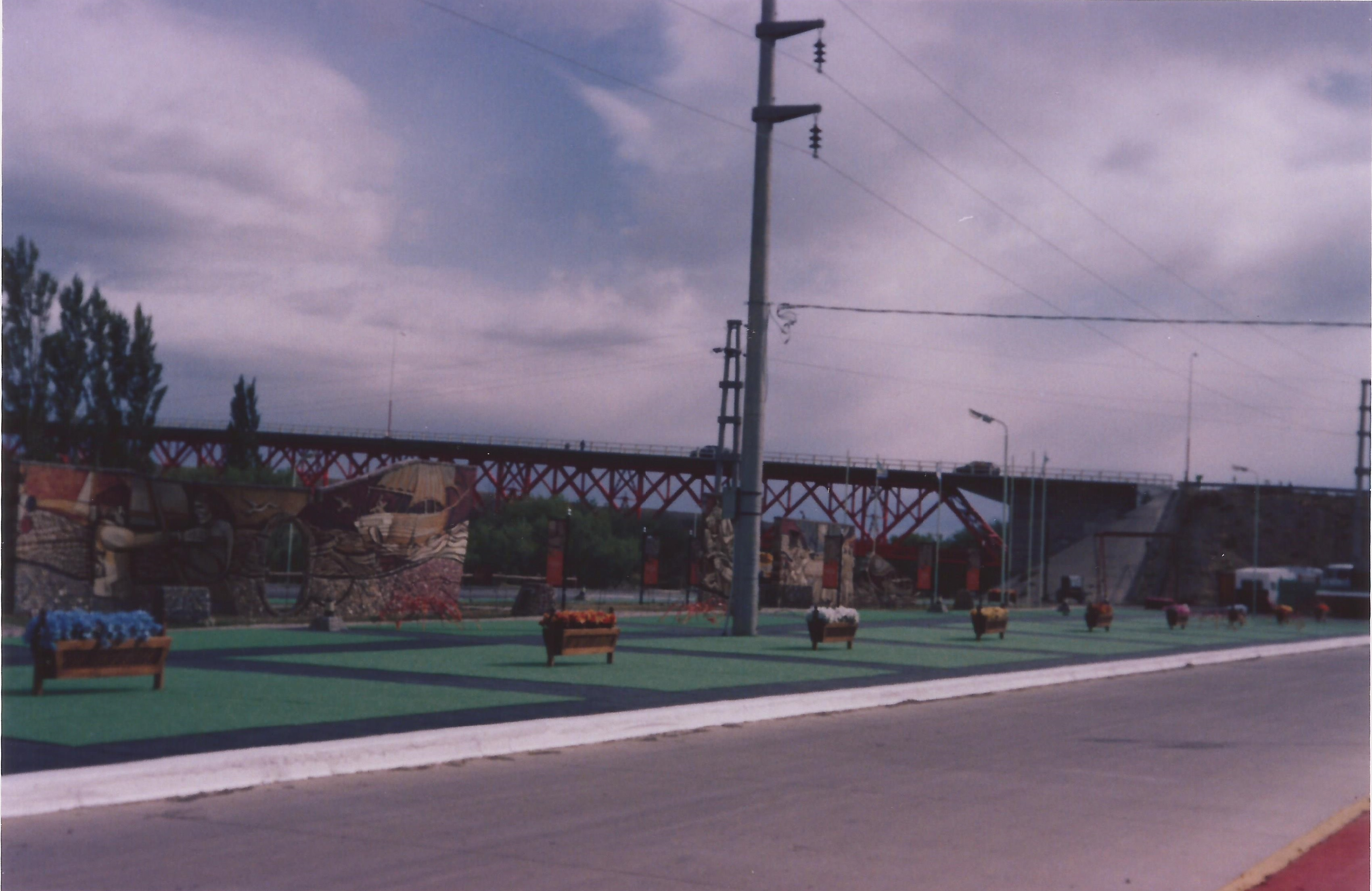
Comandante Luis Piedrabuena

Comandante Luis Piedrabuena is a town (with 9,278 inhabitants at the 2022 Census) in the department of Corpen Aike in Santa Cruz province in Argentina.

Located on the left bank of the Santa Cruz river on Ruta Nacional N° 3, it is 231 km from the city of Río Gallegos and 467 km from Caleta Olivia.

It was first settled by Argentina explorer Luis Piedrabuena in 1859, who established a town on Pavón Island.

It was given its present name in 1933.
