= Magallanes Department =

Coordinates: 49°18′16″S 67°43′47″W

Magallanes
- Department
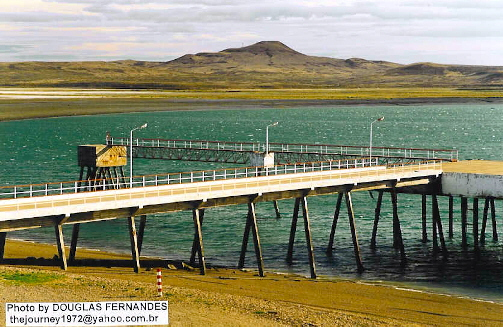

- Location of Magallanes Department in Santa Cruz Province.
- Country: Argentina
- Province: Santa Cruz
- Seat: Puerto San Julián

Area
  - Total: 19,805 km^{2} (7,647 sq mi)

Population
  - Total: 12,911
- Time zone: UTC−3 (ART)

Magallanes Department is one of the seven departments in Santa Cruz Province, Argentina. It has an area of 19,805 km^{2} and had a population of 12,911 at the 2022 Census. The seat of the department is at the town of Puerto San Julián.

== Municipalities ==
- Puerto San Julián
