= Corpen Aike Department =

Coordinates: 50°01′07″S 68°31′12″W

Corpen Aike
- Department
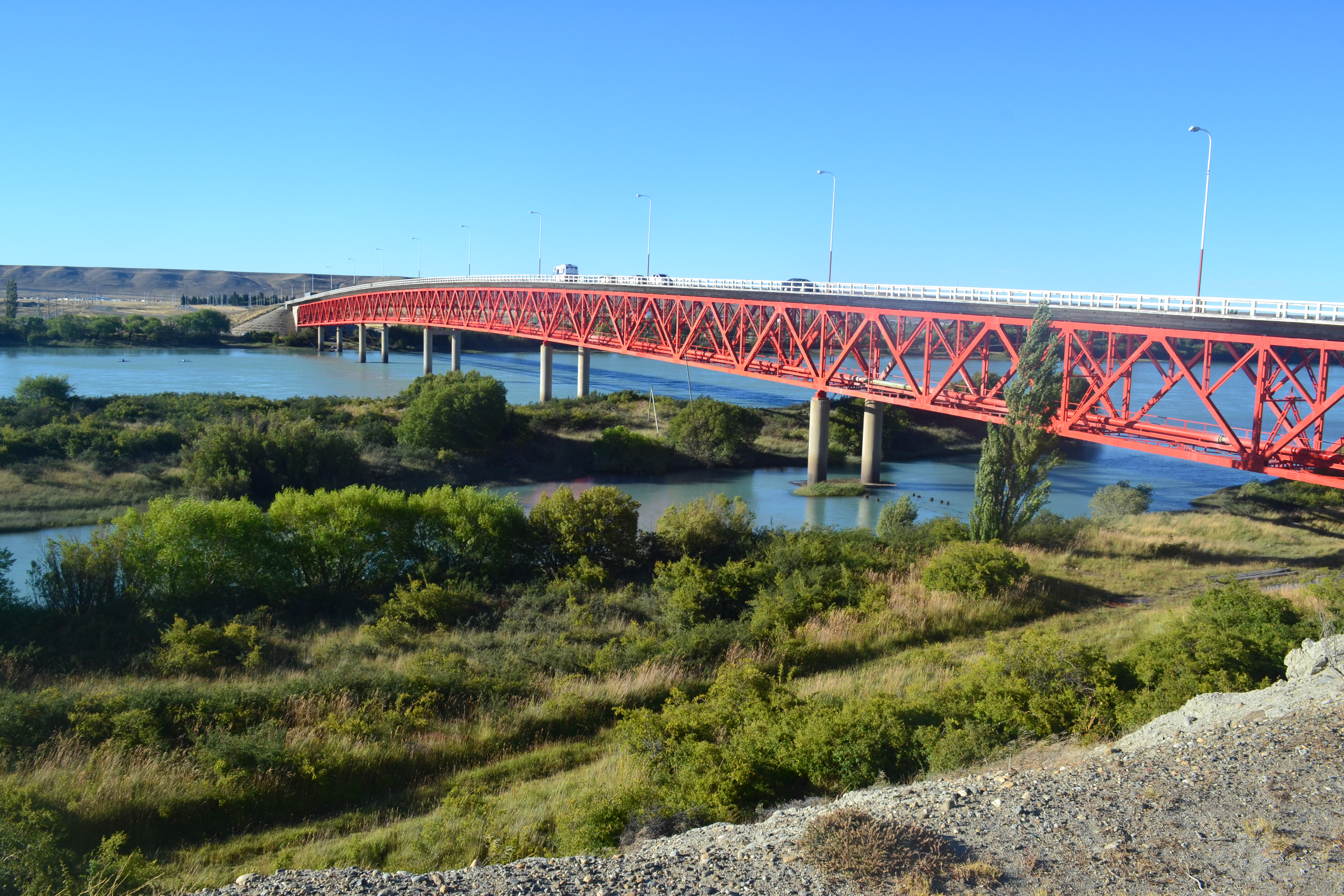

- Location of Corpen Aike Department in Santa Cruz Province.
- Country: Argentina
- Province: Santa Cruz
- Seat: Puerto Santa Cruz

Area
  - Total: 26,350 km^{2} (10,170 sq mi)

Population
  - Total: 15,171
  - Density: 0.5757/km^{2} (1.491/sq mi)

Corpen Aike Department is one of the seven departments in Santa Cruz Province, Argentina. It has an area of 26,350 km^{2}. The seat of the department is in Puerto Santa Cruz. It borders the departments of Río Chico and Magallanes to the north, Lago Argentino to the west, and Güer Aike to the south, and has coastlines on the Atlantic Ocean to the east. It is traversed from west to east by the Santa Cruz and Chico rivers.

== Demographics ==
The department had a population of 15,171 in the final figures from the 2022 Census (INDEC, 2022), which represented a 36.76% increase from the 11,093 inhabitants recorded in the previous 2010 census (INDEC, 2010).

== Protected Natural Areas ==
In the Corpen Aike department is located Monte León National Park, covering approximately 62,000 hectares, which was established on October 20, 2004.

On that date, the law creating the new national park was sanctioned, making it at the time the first continental marine park in Argentina.

== Municipalities ==
- Comandante Luis Piedrabuena
- Puerto Santa Cruz
- Puerto de Punta Quilla

== See also ==
- Departments of Argentina
