= Puerto San Julián =

- Town
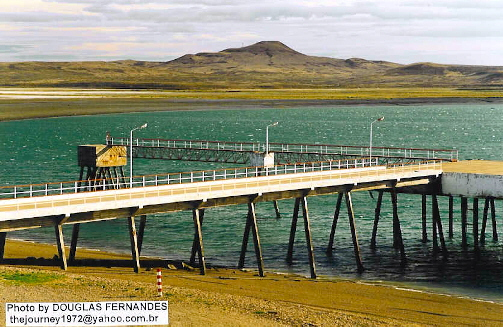
- San Julián Bay

- Location of Puerto San Julián in Argentina
- Coordinates: 49°18′S 67°43′W
- Country: Argentina
- Province: Santa Cruz
- Department: Magallanes

Government
  - Intendant: Daniel Gardonio (UCR)
- Elevation: 1 m (3.3 ft)

Population
  - Total: 12,493
- Time zone: UTC−3 (ART)
- CPA base: Z9310
- Climate: BSk

Puerto San Julián, also known historically as Port St. Julian, is a natural harbour in Patagonia in the Santa Cruz Province of Argentina located at 49°18′S 67°43′W. In the days of sailing ships it formed a stopping point, 180 km (112 mi) south of Puerto Deseado (Port Desire). Puerto San Julián is also the name of the town (population 12,493 as per the 2001 census [INDEC]) located on the harbour; the town is also the administrative capital of Magallanes Department within the province, and contains over 96% of the department's population in 2022.

== History ==
Puerto San Julián was given its name by the leader of a Spanish expedition, the Portuguese navigator Ferdinand Magellan, who arrived there on 31 March 1520 and stopped for the winter with his crew in the harbour, staying for five months. They met the native people who were described by Antonio Pigafetta as giants, and called them Patagonians. Although Pigafetta's account does not describe how this name came about, subsequent popular interpretations gave credence to a derivation meaning 'land of the big feet'. However, this etymology is questionable. The term is most likely derived from an actual character name, "Patagón", a savage creature confronted by Primaleón of Greece, the hero in the Spanish chivalry novel by Francisco Vázquez, published in 1512, much in fashion at the time, and a favourite reading of Magellan. Magellan's perception of the natives, dressed in skins, and eating raw meat, clearly recalled the uncivilized Patagón in Vázquez's book. Novelist and travel writer Bruce Chatwin suggests etymological roots of both Patagon and Patagonia in his book, In Patagonia, noting the similarity between "Patagon" and the Greek word παταγος, which means "a roaring" or "gnashing of teeth" (in his chronicle, Pigafetta describes the Patagonians as "roaring like bulls").

At the start of April, Magellan was faced by a mutiny led by his captains at midnight on Easter Sunday (20 April in 1520), but succeeded in overcoming it, executing mutineers including one captain and leaving another behind. He left the port on 21 August 1520 and on 21 October found the eastern entrance to the passageway he was looking for, the strait that now bears his name.

Fifty-eight years later Francis Drake during his circumnavigation reached the harbour, arriving on 15 June 1578 and also choosing to overwinter. They found the remains of the gallows where Magellan had executed mutineers. Drake had also been having difficulty with discontent during the voyage, and charged his friend Thomas Doughty with treachery and incitement to mutiny. A trial found Doughty guilty, but only on the mutiny charge. At Drake's insistence, Doughty was beheaded, but this stern example did not have the desired effect. Increasing tensions between mariners and gentlemen explorers brought the prospect of mutiny about a month later. Drake used a sermon to make a speech laying down rules of conduct, with himself in sole command. In August they went on to the Strait of Magellan.

The settlement of Floridablanca, a short lived Spanish colony of approximately 150 people, was founded not far from San Julián in 1780 by King Charles II. It was abandoned by 1784, and its ruins were rediscovered during the 1980s.

The port continued in use, and the young naturalist Charles Darwin arrived with the Beagle survey expedition under captain Robert FitzRoy in January 1834. While HMS Beagle carried out its hydrographic survey, Darwin explored the local geology in cliffs near the harbour and found fossils of pieces of spine and a hind leg of "some large animal, I fancy a Mastodon". On their return to England, the anatomist Richard Owen revealed that the bones were actually from a gigantic creature resembling the Llama and the camel, which Owen named Macrauchenia. This was one of the discoveries leading to the inception of Darwin's theory.

During the late 19th and early 20th centuries, San Julián and the surrounding countryside (or "camp" as it was known in the argot of the day) was an important sheep-raising region, and the "Swift" company installed a frigorifico, or freezer plant complex, along the coast to the north of the city itself.

During the 1982 Falklands War, as San Julian is one of the nearest point to the islands, the city airfield was used by the Argentine Air Force. Two fighter squadrons, flying Daggers and A-4 Skyhawks, made 149 sorties against the British in the 45 days of operations. Ironically, many of San Julián's early inhabitants had been British subjects from the Falkland Islands, who worked in the region's sheep-raising industry.

== Geography ==
=== Climate ===
Puerto San Julián has a cold semi-arid climate (Köppen climate classification: BSk) that is nevertheless mild for its latitude. Summers are mild and dry, whereas winter remain firmly above freezing during daytime, with frosts being common albeit often light during nights.

Climate data for Puerto San Julián (1991–2020, extremes 1951–1960 and 1962–present) (Note: The record highs and lows are based on the Secretaria de Mineria link for the period 1951–1960 and from 1971–1980 while records beyond 1962 come from the Servicio Meteorológico Nacionallink since it only covers from 1962–present)
Month	Jan	Feb	Mar	Apr	May	Jun	Jul	Aug	Sep	Oct	Nov	Dec	Year
Record high °C (°F)	37.5 (99.5)	37.4 (99.3)	36.8 (98.2)	30.7 (87.3)	25.2 (77.4)	22.8 (73.0)	19.3 (66.7)	23.4 (74.1)	29.8 (85.6)	31.4 (88.5)	32.2 (90.0)	37.0 (98.6)	37.5 (99.5)
Mean daily maximum °C (°F)	22.9 (73.2)	22.3 (72.1)	19.9 (67.8)	16.1 (61.0)	11.3 (52.3)	7.5 (45.5)	7.4 (45.3)	10.0 (50.0)	13.4 (56.1)	16.7 (62.1)	19.6 (67.3)	21.4 (70.5)	15.7 (60.3)
Daily mean °C (°F)	16.1 (61.0)	15.3 (59.5)	13.2 (55.8)	10.0 (50.0)	6.5 (43.7)	3.6 (38.5)	3.3 (37.9)	4.8 (40.6)	7.4 (45.3)	10.2 (50.4)	13.0 (55.4)	14.7 (58.5)	9.8 (49.6)
Mean daily minimum °C (°F)	9.4 (48.9)	8.9 (48.0)	7.4 (45.3)	4.9 (40.8)	2.1 (35.8)	−0.1 (31.8)	−0.5 (31.1)	0.6 (33.1)	2.3 (36.1)	4.2 (39.6)	6.5 (43.7)	8.3 (46.9)	4.5 (40.1)
Record low °C (°F)	−0.8 (30.6)	−1.8 (28.8)	−2.5 (27.5)	−6.1 (21.0)	−8.8 (16.2)	−13.8 (7.2)	−12.3 (9.9)	−9.8 (14.4)	−8.6 (16.5)	−5.5 (22.1)	−2.1 (28.2)	−0.4 (31.3)	−13.8 (7.2)
Average precipitation mm (inches)	16.5 (0.65)	25.7 (1.01)	25.6 (1.01)	16.1 (0.63)	24.8 (0.98)	30.6 (1.20)	25.6 (1.01)	18.7 (0.74)	16.9 (0.67)	17.6 (0.69)	15.5 (0.61)	24.6 (0.97)	258.2 (10.17)
Average precipitation days (≥ 0.1 mm)	6.9	7.0	6.8	7.0	7.8	7.8	6.9	7.4	6.8	6.9	7.1	8.7	87.0
Average snowy days	0.0	0.0	0.1	0.2	0.9	3.3	3.8	1.9	1.2	0.6	0.1	0.1	12.1
Average relative humidity (%)	51.5	56.7	59.3	62.5	69.5	74.5	74.4	69.6	64.0	57.0	52.0	52.5	62.0
Mean monthly sunshine hours	257.3	206.2	186.0	156.0	130.2	108.0	117.8	139.5	156.0	201.5	248.0	254.2	2,160.7
Mean daily sunshine hours	8.3	7.3	6.0	5.2	4.2	3.6	3.8	4.5	5.2	6.5	8.0	8.2	5.9
Source 1: Servicio Meteorológico Nacional (extremes 1962–present)
Source 2: Secretaria de Mineria,

== Notable people ==
- Viviana Alder, Antarctic researcher
