= Santa Cruz Province, Argentina =

Province of Argentina

Santa Cruz
- Province
- Province of Santa Cruz; Provincia de Santa Cruz (Spanish)
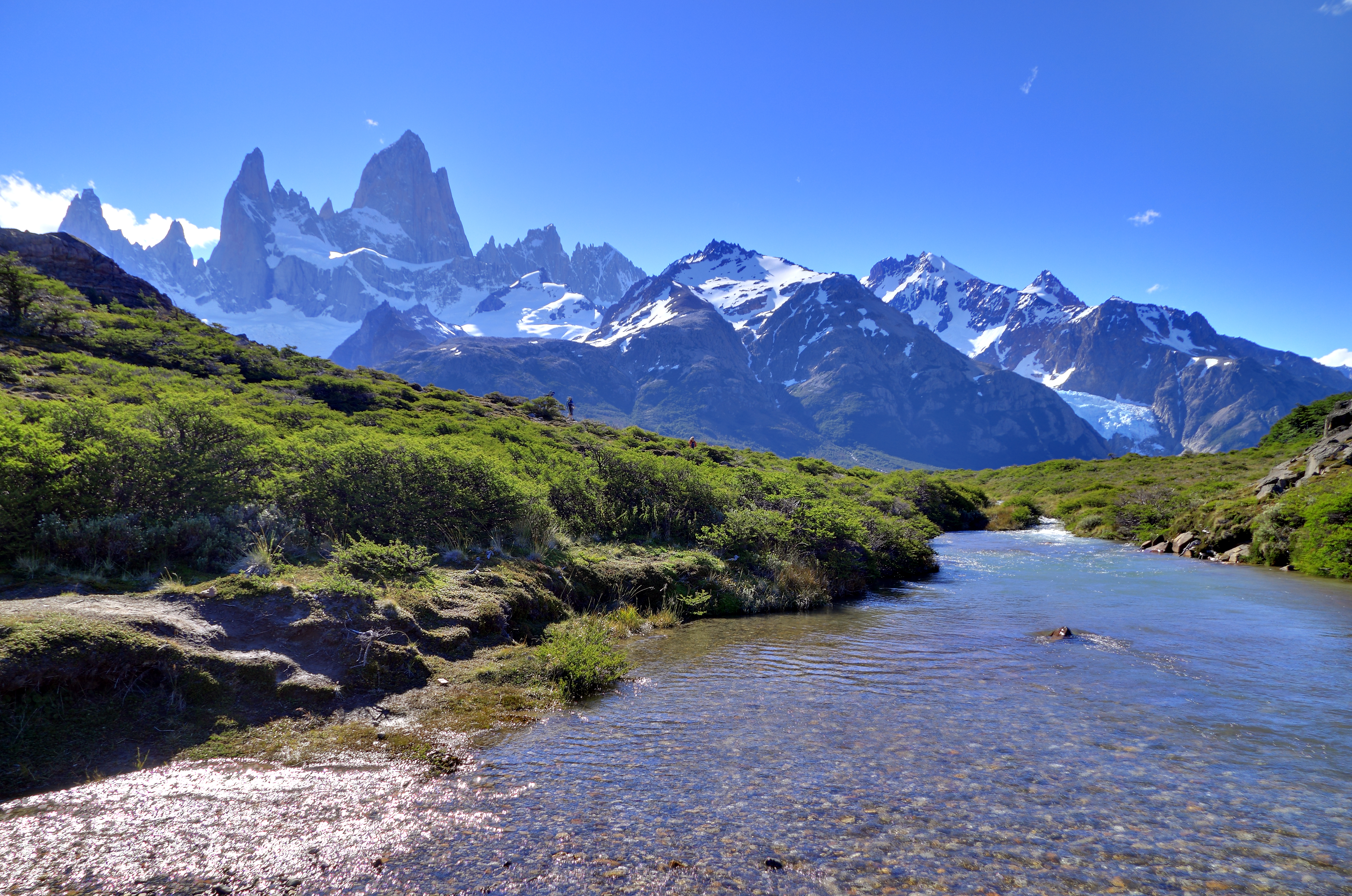
- View of Mount Fitz Roy

- Flag Coat of arms

- Location of Santa Cruz within Argentina
- Coordinates: 48.62°S 70.01°W
- Country: Argentina
- Departments: 7
- Municipalities: 27
- Capital: Río Gallegos

Government
  - Governor: Claudio Vidal (SER)
  - Vice Governor: Fabián Leguizamón (PJ)
  - Legislature: 24
  - National Deputies: 5
  - National Senators: José M. Carambia (SER); Natalia Gadano (SER); Alicia Kirchner (UP)

Area Ranked 2nd
  - Total: 243,943 km^{2} (94,187 sq mi)

Population (2022 census (final figures))
  - Total: 337,226
  - Rank: 23rd
  - Density: 1.38240/km^{2} (3.58039/sq mi)
- Demonym: santacruceño

GDP
  - Total: US$ 5.2 billion
  - Per capita: US$ 13,800
- Time zone: UTC−3 (ART)
- ISO 3166 code: AR-Z
- HDI (2021): 0.854 very high (5th)
- Website: www.santacruz.gov.ar

Santa Cruz Province (Spanish: Provincia de Santa Cruz, Spanish pronunciation: [ˈsanta ˈkɾus], "Holy Cross") is a province of Argentina, located in the southern part of the country, in Patagonia. It borders Chubut Province to the north, and Chile to the west and south, with the Atlantic coast to the east. Santa Cruz is the second-largest province of the country (after Buenos Aires Province), and the least densely populated in mainland Argentina. It covers a land area of 243,943 km^{2} and had a population of 337,226 at the 2022 Census.

The indigenous people of the province are the Tehuelches, who despite European exploration from the 16th century onwards, retained independence until the late 19th century. Soon after the Conquest of the Desert in the 1870s, the area was organised as the Territory of Santa Cruz, named after its original capital in Puerto Santa Cruz. The capital moved to Rio Gallegos in 1888 and has remained there ever since. Immigrants from various European countries came to the territory in the late 19th and early 20th century during a gold rush. Santa Cruz became a province of Argentina in 1957.

== History ==
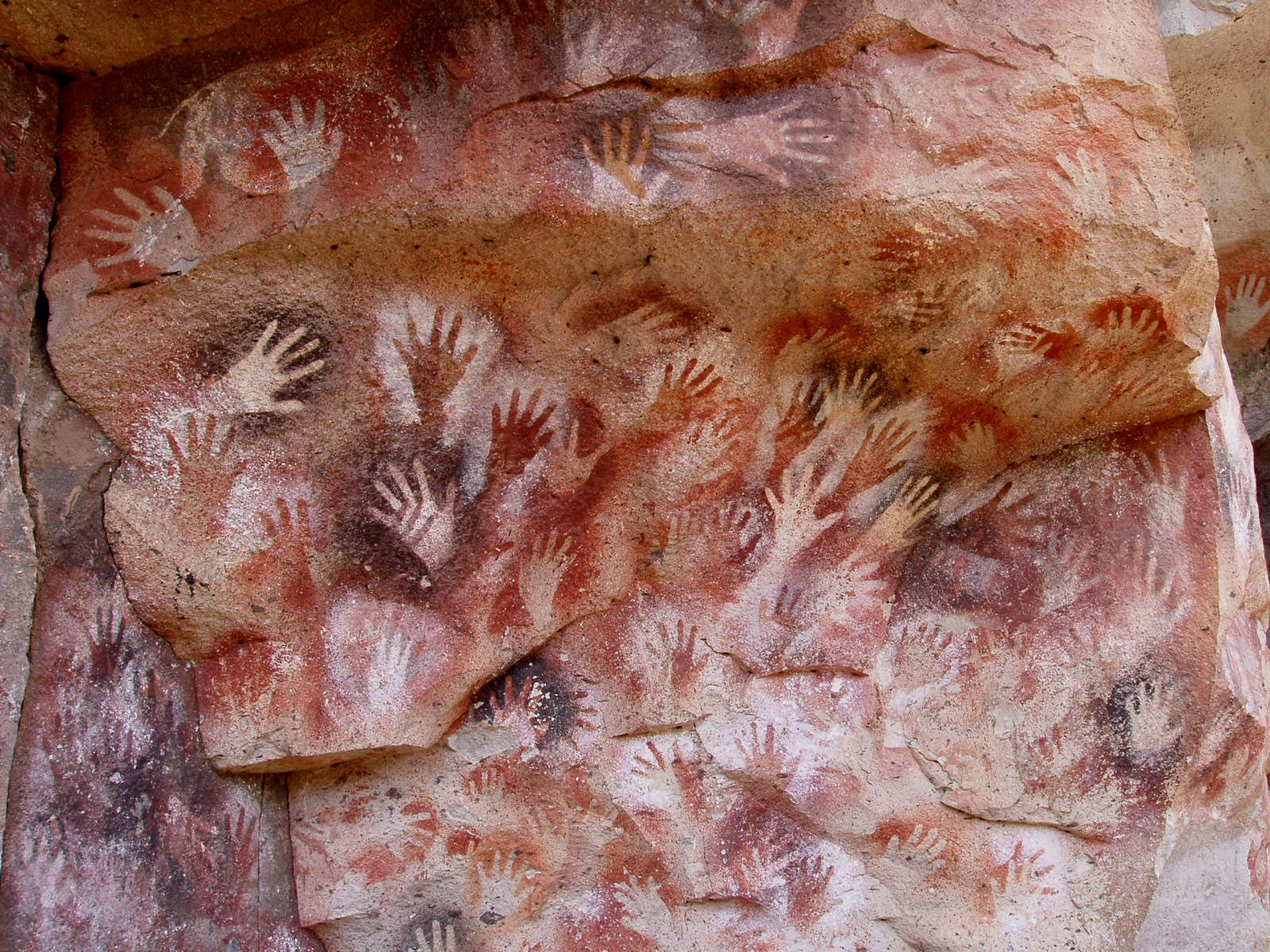
Ochre-ink art in Cueva de las Manos, Santa Cruz. Made by the long-vanished Toldense people, they are 13,000–9,000 years old.

The Tehuelches inhabited these lands before the arrivals of the Spanish colonisation. In 1520 Ferdinand Magellan arrived to what is currently known as San Julián Bay. 15 years later Martín de Alcazaba explored the area near the Chico River, which he named Gallegos River. Because of the attacks of British privateers, and after the visit of Francis Drake in 1578, the Spaniards sent Pedro Sarmiento de Gamboa to fortify and map the Strait of Magellan and prevent access to Spanish posts in the Pacific.

In the middle of the 18th century, the Jesuits settled in the area, establishing a few missions. When the Viceroyalty of the Río de la Plata was created in 1776, the region was set under the rule of Buenos Aires. Antonio de Biedma founded Nueva Colonia near present Puerto Deseado and Floridablanca not far from Puerto San Julián, both of them shut down later by Viceroy Vertíz.

Between 1825 and 1836 there were a series of explorations of the regions, including that of Charles Darwin in 1834. In 1860 commander Luis Piedrabuena established a base on Isla Pavón in the estuary of Puerto Deseado.

In 1878 the Government of Patagonia was created, with capital in Viedma, but six years later it was split into smaller entities, with the territory declared National Government of Santa Cruz, whose capital was the city of Santa Cruz. In 1901 the capital was moved to its current location at the city of Río Gallegos.

At the beginning of the 20th century, a large European immigration began to arrive to the almost uninhabited zone; Spanish, Germans, British and Slavs were the most numerous among them. They came mainly to escape the growing conflicts of World War I, and were attracted by the wool industry of the area. The beginning of the war meant a sharp reduction in the amount of exports, bringing a serious economic crisis to Santa Cruz.

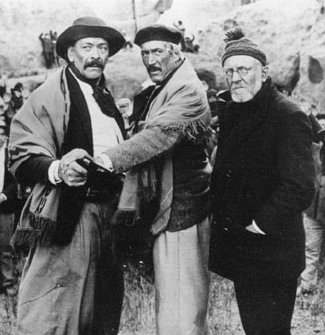
Scene from La Patagonia rebelde. Based on an ill-fated local strike in 1922, the 1974 epic was made with the encouragement of Santa Cruz's governor.

The ideals of progressivism, brought by the Spanish immigrants, grew among the workers who, working in Santa Cruz's harsh environment under often sub-human conditions, decided to strike in 1922. The strike was severely and harshly repressed by the government, culminating in the events of the Patagonia Trágica ("Tragic Patagonia"), the execution of dozens of strikers.

In 1944, the Military zone of Comodoro Rivadavia was created, which encompassed the northern part of the National Government of Santa Cruz and the southern part of Chubut Province. This jurisdiction lasted until the abolition of the measures in 1955. The Territory of Santa Cruz acquired province status in 1957.

In 1973, voters in Santa Cruz elected Jorge Cepernic, a Peronist. An advocate of labor rights, Gov. Cepernic worked with film maker Osvaldo Bayer to make La Patagonia Rebelde ('"Rebellion in Patagonia"), a documentary drama on the ill-fated 1922 sheep ranch laborers' strike. For this, Gov. Cepernic was imprisoned following the March 1976 coup.

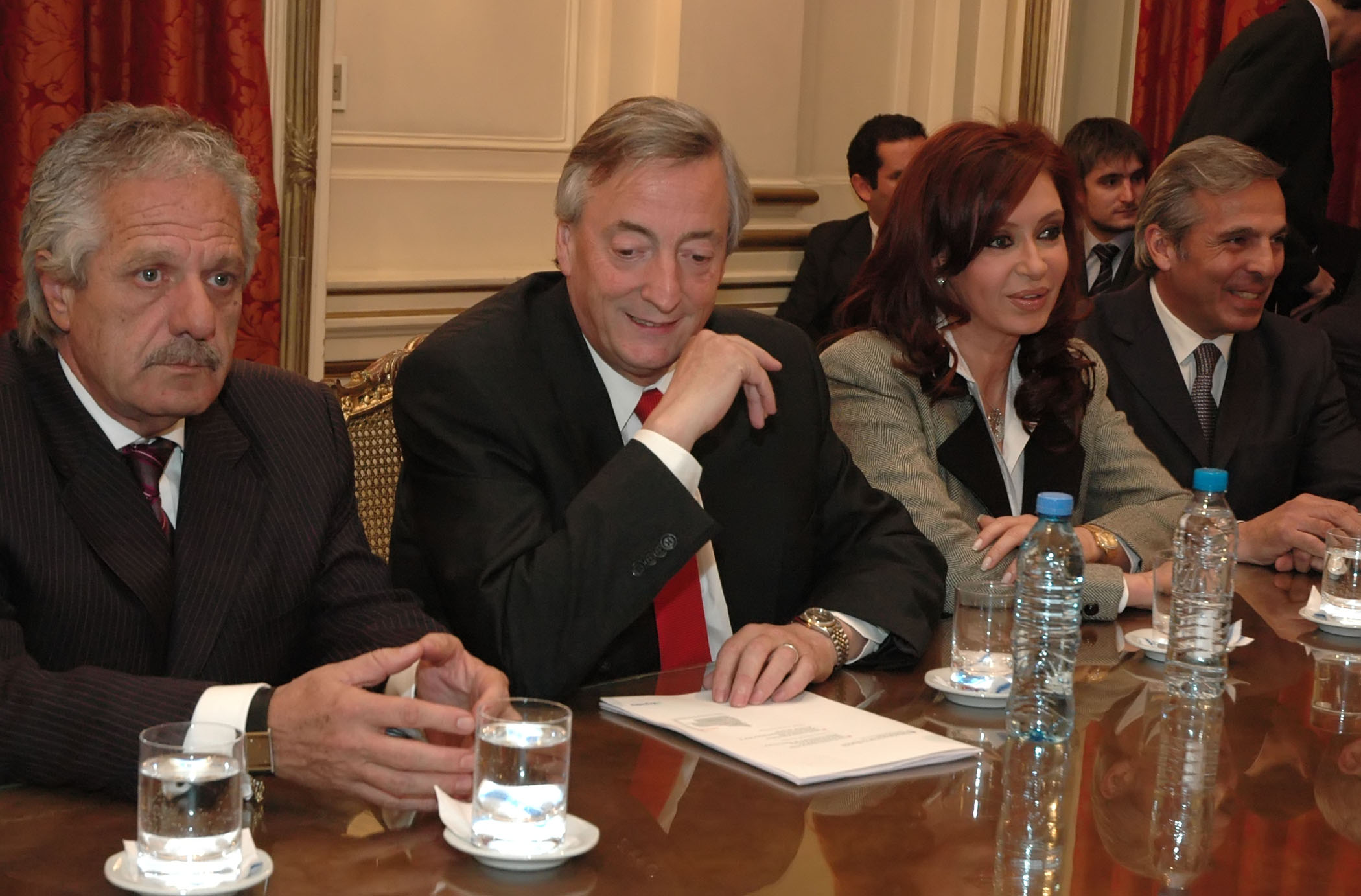
Néstor and Cristina Kirchner (center) in conference with fellow Patagonia-area lawmakers.

The return to democracy in Argentina in 1983 brought new, mostly young leadership to Santa Cruz's elected posts, among them a well-known local country lawyer named Néstor Kirchner, elected that year to the Río Gallegos City Council. Elected mayor in 1987 and governor in 1991, Kirchner helped negotiate a US$535 million payout for his province following the 1993 privatization of the state-owned oil concern YPF. Earning plaudits for his careful administration of the funds, Kirchner was elected president of Argentina in April 2003, following the withdrawal of Carlos Menem from a runoff which Kirchner was projected to win handily.

Presiding over four years of expansion totalling 42% (the best performance for the Argentine economy since the 1880s), Pres. Kirchner steered record spending into public works (particularly those in his province, as is customary for Argentine presidents).

This map shows section A and B of the 1998 agreement between Argentina and Chile.

In the Province there is a border dispute with Chile in the Southern Patagonian Ice Field, in 1898 the border was defined and wasn't objected during the 1902 Arbitral award of the Andes which defined most of the border on the current Province territory. Both experts, Francisco Pascasio Moreno from Argentina and Diego Barros Arana from Chile agreed on the border between Mount Fitz Roy and Cerro Daudet. However the border started being questioned by Argentina later on which started the dispute between both countries. In 1998 a border redraw is agreed, being pending to this day the part between Mount Fitz Roy and Cerro Murallón, however a new border was drawn between Cerro Murallón and Cerro Daudet.

In the 20th century both countries had another dispute over the Del Desierto Lake which was resolved in favor of Argentina in 1994 and had its climax in 1965 when Lieutenant Hernán Merino Correa was killed by Argentine Gendarmerie.

== Geography ==
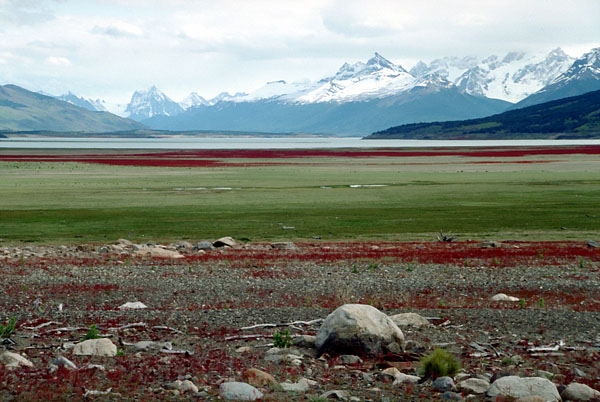
The windswept Patagonian landscape of Santa Cruz.

The province is generally divided into two distinct regions: The Andes in the west and the plateaux in the centre and east. In the Andes, there are numerous lakes such as Buenos Aires Lake (2,240 km^{2}, 881 km^{2} in Argentina), Cardiel Lake (460 km^{2}), Viedma Lake (1,082 km^{2}), Argentino Lake (1,560 km^{2}), Pueyrredón Lake, Belgrano Lake and San Martín Lake (1,013 km^{2}). One characteristic of the Andean region is the presence of the Southern Patagonian Ice Field that covers the central part of the Andes.

From the centre to the Atlantic coast in the east, the landscape is dominated by plateaux. These plateaux are made up of basalt rock occurring in stepped sequences. The plateaux are of different ages, with the older –of Neogene and Paleogene age– being located at higher elevations than Pleistocene and Holocene lava plateaus and outcroppings. There are isolated pockets of hills and depressions within this region. In Gran Bajo de San Julián, the Laguna del Carbón is 105 meters below sea level, and is the lowest point in the Western and Southern Hemispheres. On the Atlantic coast, it is characterised by cliffs.

=== Hydrography ===
The main rivers in the province are the Deseado River (Spanish: Río Deseado), Chico River (Spanish: Río Chico), Santa Cruz River (Spanish: Río Santa Cruz), Coig River (Spanish: Río Coig), and the Gallegos River (Spanish: Río Gallegos). These rivers all originate in the Andes and drain into the lakes before moving eastwards to empty into the Atlantic Ocean.

=== Climate ===
Köppen climate map of Santa Cruz, Argentina

The Andes block most of the incoming frontal systems and as a result, most of the rainfall occurs on the western side of the mountains, with precipitation rapidly decreasing as one moves eastward. As a result, except for the westernmost parts of the province where precipitation is abundant as the area comes under greater influence from prevailing winds from the Pacific, much of the province is dry. Unlike the Northern Hemisphere where there are large land masses to allow cold temperatures, cold fronts, which usually originate from the southwest and move northeast and are moderated by the Pacific Ocean, resulting in less intense cold temperatures. Similar to much of Patagonia, the climate of the province is characterized by strong westerlies, which also enhances evapotranspiration. In general, the southern sections of the province are colder than those to the north.

==== Temperatures ====
The mean temperatures for the province are relatively cold for its latitude due to the cold Falkland Current. The extreme northeast coast is by far the mildest area, with annual temperatures around 8 to 9 °C (46.4 to 48.2 °F) with temperatures inland being 1 °C to 2 °C lower. The coldest temperatures are found in the southern parts of the province with an annual mean of 6 °C (42.8 °F) although in the western parts of the province which are at higher altitudes, the mean can be below 5 °C (41.0 °F) and even below 0 °C (32.0 °F) at the highest elevations. In the summer, mean temperatures range from 16 °C (60.8 °F) in the North to around 12 °C (53.6 °F) in the south. However, temperatures can reach up to 35 °C (95.0 °F) in all parts of the province except at the highest elevations. Winters are cold throughout the province, with more uniform temperatures than during the summer; July temperatures average 4 °C (39.2 °F) in the North to 2 °C (35.6 °F) in the southern parts. Temperatures can plummet below −20 °C (−4.0 °F) in the interior while at the coast, it infrequently drops below −15 °C (5.0 °F).

==== Precipitation ====
As the Andes block most precipitation of the incoming frontal systems, most of the rainfall occurs on the western side of the mountains, with precipitation rapidly decreasing as one moves eastward. Much of the province receives less than 200 millimetres (8 in) of precipitation a year, while the Andean region, which is under greater influence from the Pacific, it can receive more than 1,000 millimetres (39 in). Precipitation mainly falls in the form of light rain with heavy rain and thunderstorms being rare, with these two only occurring during the summer. In all parts of the province, more precipitation falls in the winter than in the summer.

==== Wind ====
The prevalent wind directions are from the west, southwest and northwest and together, these occur 60% of the time. Northern parts of the province tend to have more northwest winds than the southern parts of the province. With few landmasses south of 46°S, the province is dominated by strong winds throughout the year. Summers are windier than winters. The strongest winds are found in the Andean region while the weakest are found in the coastal areas. With a mean wind speed of 10 metres per second (33 ft/s), the province is the windiest in Argentina. Gusts can reach up to 200 kilometres per hour (120 mph) in some places.

==== Sunshine ====
Although most of the province is dry, the province is relatively cloudy. The percent of cloudy days ranges from 50% in the north to 60% in the south. Average daily sunshine hours range from 6 hours/day in the North to 4 hours/day in the south with the lowest in the coastal areas in the south.

==== Statistics ====
Average Temperatures in selected locations in °C (°F)
	Jan	Feb	Mar	Apr	May	Jun	Jul	Aug	Sept	Oct	Nov	Dec	Annual
Río Gallegos	13.8 (56.8)	13.2 (55.8)	10.8 (51.4)	7.6 (45.7)	4.2 (39.6)	1.4 (34.5)	1.2 (34.2)	3.1 (37.6)	5.7 (42.3)	8.4 (47.1)	11.1 (52.0)	12.8 (55.0)	7.8 (46.0)
El Calafate	13.1 (55.6)	12.9 (55.2)	10.8 (51.4)	7.6 (45.7)	4.0 (39.2)	1.6 (34.9))	0.7 (33.3)	2.6 (36.7)	5.3 (41.5)	8.3 (46.9)	10.8 (51.4)	12.3 (54.1)	7.5 (45.5)
Gobernador Gregores	14.1 (57.4)	14.5 (58.1)	12.3 (54.1)	9.0 (48.2)	4.5 (40.1)	0.8 (33.4)	1.1 (34.0)	3.4 (38.1)	6.4 (43.5)	9.4 (48.9)	12.3 (54.1)	14.2 (57.6)	8.5 (47.3)
Puerto Deseado	15.5 (59.9)	15.3 (59.5)	13.3 (55.9)	10.4 (50.7)	6.7 (44.1)	3.9 (39.0)	3.6 (38.5)	5.1 (41.2)	7.4 (45.3)	10.0 (50.0)	12.8 (55.0)	14.4 (57.9)	9.9 (49.8)
Puerto San Julián	16.3 (61.3)	15.6 (60.1)	13.2 (55.8)	9.8 (49.6)	6.2 (43.2)	3.4 (38.1)	3.2 (37.8)	4.8 (40.6)	7.4 (45.3)	10.4 (50.7)	13.2 (55.8)	15.1 (59.2)	9.9 (49.8)
Puerto Santa Cruz	14.3 (57.7)	14.1 (57.4)	12.0 (53.6)	8.7 (47.7)	4.7 (40.5)	2.0 (35.6)	2.2 (36.0)	3.4 (38.1)	6.1 (43.0)	9.2 (48.6)	11.4 (52.5)	13.1 (55.6)	8.4 (47.1)

Average Precipitation in selected locations in mm (in)
	Jan	Feb	Mar	Apr	May	Jun	Jul	Aug	Sept	Oct	Nov	Dec	Annual
Río Gallegos	27.7 (1.09)	27.1 (1.07)	26.7 (1.05)	26.7 (1.05)	26.9 (1.06)	18.3 (0.72)	19.2 (0.76)	16.9 (0.67)	13.3 (0.52)	16.9 (0.67)	22.7 (0.89)	25.9 (1.02)	268.3 (10.56)
El Calafate	12.5 (0.49)	7.8 (0.31)	13.8 (0.54)	25.4 (1.00)	30.6 (1.20)	21.3 (0.84)	25.8 (1.02)	21.1 (0.83)	15.8 (0.62)	12.3 (0.48)	9.1 (0.36)	13.9 (0.55)	209.4 (8.24)
Gobernador Gregores	28.5 (1.12)	17.5 (0.69)	13.0 (0.51)	9.0 (0.35)	24.0 (0.94)	15.5 (0.61)	17.0 (0.67)	10.5 (0.41)	10.5 (0.41)	14.5 (0.57)	10.5 (0.41)	14.5 (0.57)	185.0 (7.28)
Puerto Deseado	21.3 (0.84)	15.5 (0.61)	15.9 (0.63)	25.4 (1.00)	30.2 (1.19)	24.6 (0.97)	27.0 (1.06)	15.8 (0.62)	13.1 (0.52)	15.2 (0.60)	9.5 (0.37)	14.1 (0.56)	227.6 (8.96)
Puerto San Julián	14.3 (0.56)	22.5 (0.89)	23.4 (0.92)	19.1 (0.75)	31.1 (1.22)	33.7 (1.33)	22.5 (0.89)	18.3 (0.72)	14.3 (0.56)	17.3 (0.68)	14.9 (0.59)	20.2 (0.80)	251.6 (9.91)
Puerto Santa Cruz	21.1 (0.83)	12.7 (0.50)	18.8 (0.74)	12.5 (0.49)	21.3 (0.84)	14.7 (0.58)	14.2 (0.56)	14.0 (0.55)	12.7 (0.50)	10.2 (0.40)	13.0 (0.51)	16.6 (0.65)	181.8 (7.16)

== Demographics ==
Santa Cruz population pyramid (2022 census)

According to the final results of the 16 May 2022 Argentine national census, the Province of Santa Cruz had 337,226 inhabitants.

== Economy ==
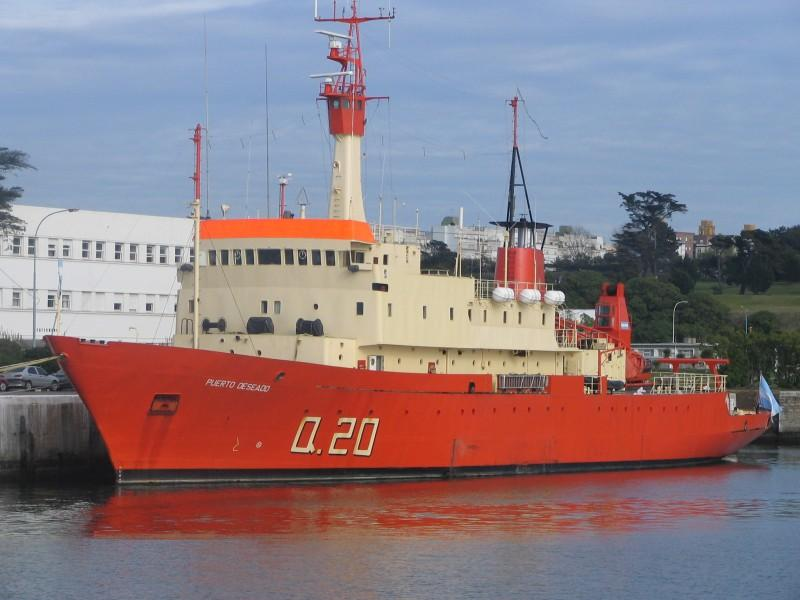
Oceanographic craft ARA Puerto Deseado

Santa Cruz, with a small population and rich in natural resources, has long had one of Argentina's most prosperous economies. Its 2006 output was estimated at US$3.3 billion or a per capita income of US$16,553. In 2011 Santa Cruz had the highest per capita income of Argentina, US$36,550.

Its economy, with the possible exception of Neuquen's, is the country's least diversified, however. Fully half its output is accounted for by the extractive sector (petroleum, gas and mining), with an annual production of 4.5 million m^{3} of petroleum and 3 million m^{3} of gas, mainly in the Pico Truncado, Cañadón seco and Cerro Redondo extracting facilities. Cerro Negro mine by Gold Corp. has in recent years contributed to the growth of population of Santa Cruz through its Gold mining operations and subsidies to local public education and private sector.

The coal production at Río Turbio, Argentina's only active coal mine, is of around one million m^{3} per year. Mining includes gold (Cerro Vanguardia Mine), clay, gypsum, salt and others.

The second most important productive activity is that associated with sheep. With 7 million heads, Santa Cruz is the second main producer of wool and meat after the Province of Chubut, most of which is designated for export. Sheep farming revived in 2002 with the devaluation of the peso and firmer global demand for wool (led by China and the EU). Still there is little investment in new abattoirs (mainly in Rio Gallegos), and often there are phytosanitary restrictions to the export of sheep meat. Livestock also includes small numbers of cattle, and in lesser numbers pigs and horses.

Sea fishing, and its later industrialization at the fishing ports of Puerto Deseado, Puerto San Julián, Puerto Santa Cruz and Río Gallegos produces prawn, squid, hake and dozens of others. Most of the production is frozen and exported.

There is little agriculture due to the arid nature of the soil. There is a small timber industry fed by both forests and planted trees, of which the wood of the lenga is the most exploited.

== Tourism ==
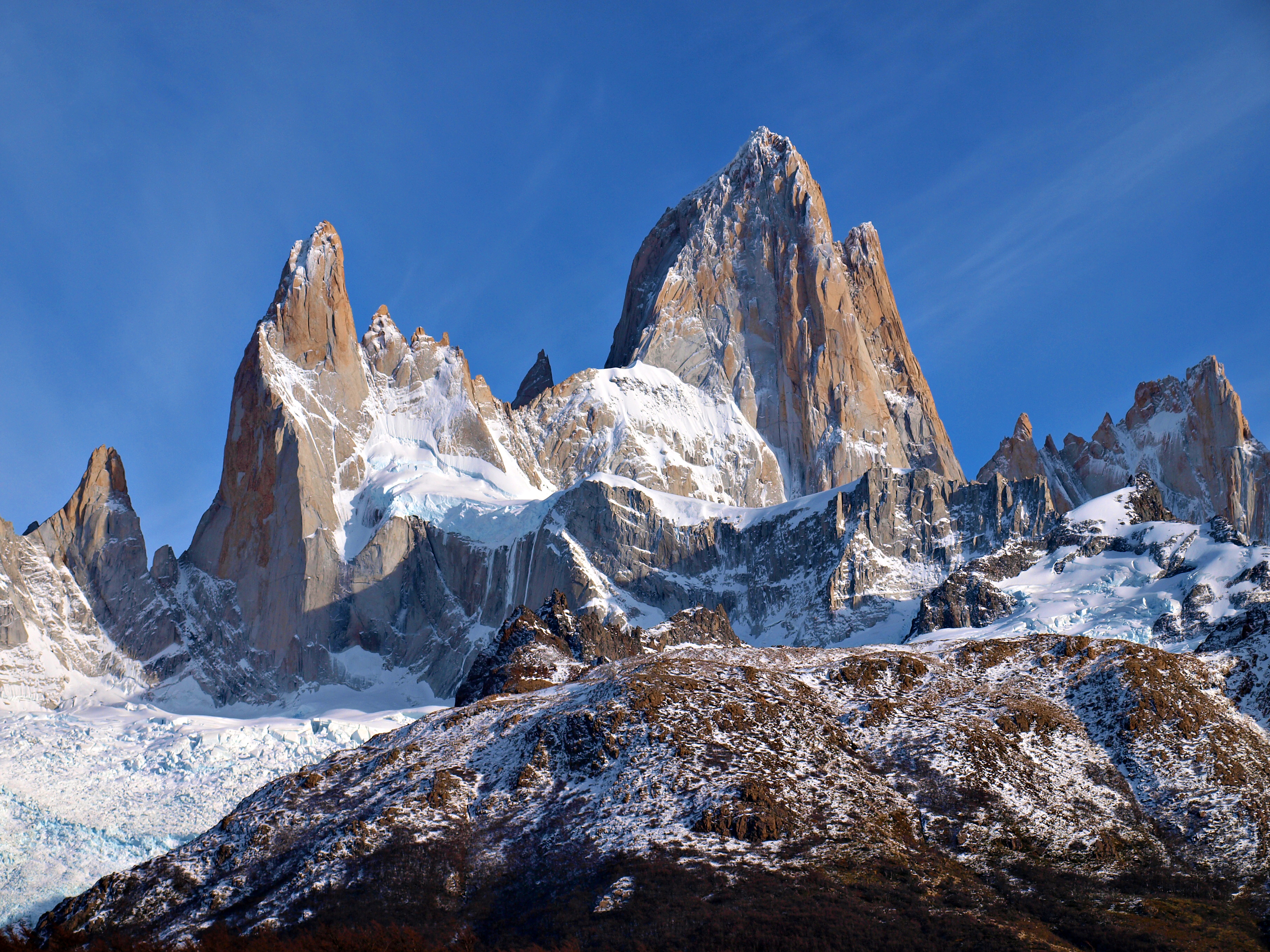
Mount Fitz Roy, near El Chaltén

Santa Cruz's most visited destination is Los Glaciares National Park and a number of glaciers of which the Perito Moreno Glacier is the most famous. Nearby El Calafate has an airport that connects the area with Buenos Aires and Trelew.

Some 200 kilometres north of El Calafate is the village of El Chaltén at the feet of the Cerro Torre and Mount Fitz Roy. Still not very developed, El Chaltén serves as a hub for various trekking routes including walks on the Viedma Glacier.

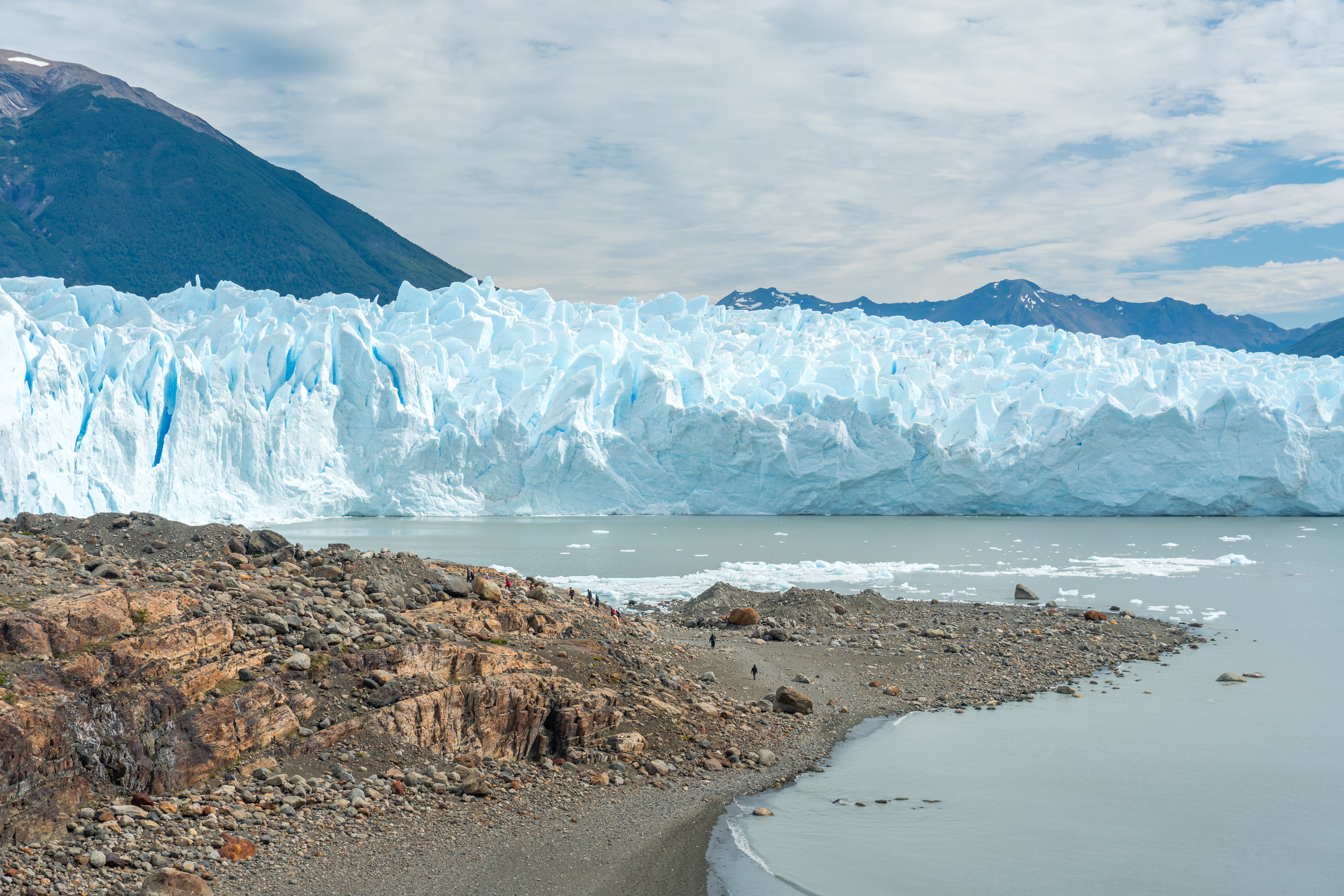
Tourists trekking by the Perito Moreno Glacier, near El Calafate

600 kilometres further north of El Chaltén, by the dirt road Ruta 40, the Cueva de las Manos near the town of Perito Moreno allows the few tourists who venture to this point to see the prehistoric wall paintings in the caves near the Pinturas River.

Perito Moreno National Park and its lakes, north of Los Glaciares, are rarely visited. Besides trekking, other sports practised on the west side of the province are sport fishing, rafting and climbing.

In the east, the National Route 3 follows the Atlantic coastline, by which buses connect the coastal cities, and take passengers both south to Tierra del Fuego and north to Chubut Province and Buenos Aires. The most visited places are the cities of Río Gallegos, the Bosques Petrificados National Monument petrified forest, and the depression of Laguna del Carbón near Puerto San Julián.

== Government ==
The provincial government is divided into three branches: the executive, headed by a popularly elected governor, who appoints the cabinet; the legislative; and the judiciary, headed by the Supreme Court.

The Constitution of Santa Cruz Province, Argentina forms the formal law of the province.

In Argentina, the most important law enforcement organization is the Argentine Federal Police but the additional work is carried out by the Santa Cruz Provincial Police.

== Political division ==
The departments of Santa Cruz Province and their respective capitals.

The province is divided into the following seven departments, listed from north to south with their capitals, their areas and their populations at the Censuses of 27 October 2010 and 16 May 2022 (final figures):

Name of Department	Area in km^{2}	Pop'n 2010 Census	Pop'n 2022 Census	Administrative Capital
Deseado	63,784	107,630	126,743	Puerto Deseado
Lago Buenos Aires	28,609	8,750	12,606	Perito Moreno
Río Chico	34,262	5,158	6,314	Gobernador Gregores
Magallanes	19,805	9,202	12,911	Puerto San Julián
Corpen Aike	26,350	11,093	15,171	Puerto Santa Cruz
Lago Argentino	37,292	18,864	25,586	El Calafate
Güer Aike	33,841	113,267	137,895	Río Gallegos
Totals	243,943	273,964	337,226	

== Sports ==
Boxing Club de Río Gallegos is the only side that competes in national leagues. The club currently plays in the Torneo Federal B, the regionalized fourth-tier in Argentine football league system. At the 2015 season it reached the second phase.

== See also ==
- Hippidion saldiasi
- Southern Patagonian Ice Field dispute
- Laguna del Desierto incident
