= Coronel Dorrego =

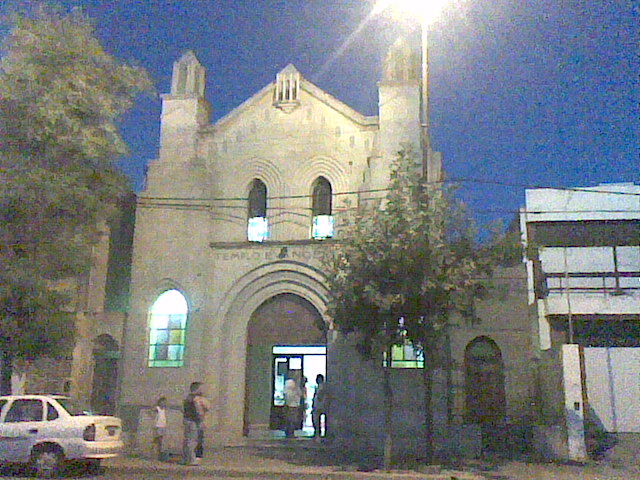
- Iglesia de general dorrego

- Location in Argentina
- Coordinates: 38°42′S 61°16′W
- Country: Argentina
- Province: Buenos Aires
- Partido: Coronel Dorrego
- Founded: October 12, 1881
- Elevation: 118 m (387 ft)

Population (2001 census [INDEC])
  - Total: 11,644
- CPA Base: B 8150
- Area code: +54 2921

Coronel Dorrego is a town in Buenos Aires Province, Argentina. It is the administrative centre for Coronel Dorrego Partido.

== Provincial Festival of the Plains ==
Fiesta Provincial de las Llanuras has been held in Coronel Dorrego since the 1960s, the festival celebrates the Gaucho traditions and features a grand asado in the town square.
