= List of lighthouses in Argentina =

This is a list of lighthouses in Argentina.

== Lighthouses ==
Name	Image	Year built	Location & coordinates	Class of light	Focal height (metres)	Admiralty no.	NGA no.	Range (nmi)
Año Nuevo Lighthouse		1902	Río Grande	Fl(3) W 3s	65.5	G1279	110-20268	21
El Rincón Light		1925	Villarino Partido	Fl (2+1) W 40s	64.5	G1020	110-19580	29.1
Les Eclaireurs Lighthouse		1920	Tierra del Fuego, Antarctica and South Atlantic Islands Province	Fl W 10s	22.5	G1320	111-2620	10
Fin del Mundo Lighthouse		1884	Isla de los Estados	Fl(2) W 15s	70	G1283	110-20269	14
Cabo Domingo Lighthouse		1933	Río Grande Department	LFl W 8s	90	G1266	110-20196	7.3
Cabo Vírgenes Lighthouse		1904	Santa Cruz Province	Fl W 5s	69.5	G1260	110-20152	24
Cabo Blanco Lighthouse		1917	Deseado Department	Fl(5) W 40s	67	G1134	110-19912	13.9
Cabo Guardián Lighthouse		1928	Deseado Department	Fl WR 7.5s	48	G1156	110-19952	13.7
Querandí Lighthouse		1922	Villa Gesell Partido	Fl(5) W 26s	65	G0910	110-19428	18
Quequén Lighthouse		1921	Quequén	Fl(2) W 15s	63	G0926	110-19480	25.7
Punta Conscriptos Lighthouse		1929	Rawson Department	Fl W 7s	97	G1072	110-19684	10.5
San Antonio Lighthouse		1892	Cape San Antonio, Argentina, San Clemente del Tuyú, La Costa Partido	Fl W 17s	63	G0904	110-19420	28
Campana Lighthouse		1928	Deseado Department	Fl(2) WR 16s	50	G1158	110-19956	11.3, 9.3
Cabo Dañoso Lighthouse		1947	Magallanes Department	Fl(4) W 45s	44	G1160	110-19960	10.3
Golfo Nuevo Lighthouse		1916	Chubut Province		34.5			
Azopardo Lighthouse			Santa Cruz Province	Fl W 7s	40	G1153	110-19944	5
Cabo San Francisco de Paula Lighthouse		1917	Corpen Aike Department	Fl(2) W 15s	86	G1196	110-20016	13.7
Almirante Brown lighthouse		1949	Viedma Department	Fl(2) W 16s	76.5	G1049	110-19640	10.2
Beauvoir Lighthouse		1980	Puerto Deseado	Fl(3) W 10s	48	G1139	110-19920	19
Buen Tiempo Lighthouse		1917	Güer Aike Department	LFl(4) W 45s	113	G1226	110-20072	13.7
Cabo Aristizábal Lighthouse		1917	Florentino Ameghino Department	Fl W 5s	46	G1097	110-19788	10.7
Cabo Curioso Lighthouse		1922	Magallanes Department	LFl(3) W 45s	92	G1162	110-19964	13.7
Cabo Peñas Lighthouse		1916	Río Grande Department	Fl(2) W 20s	42	G1274	110-20256	10.3
Cabo Raso Lighthouse		1925	Florentino Ameghino Department	Fl(3) WR 40s	53	G1084	110-19744	11.1, 6.9
Cape San Pablo Lighthouse		1945	Río Grande Department	Fl(2) W 20s	136.5	G1275	110-20260	11.2
Cabo San Pio Lighthouse		1909	Ushuaia Department	Fl(2) W 16s	55	G1292	110-20304	9.2
Chubut Lighthouse		1933	Rawson Department	Fl W 9s	36.5	G1076	110-19728	6.5
Claromecó Lighthouse		1922	Claromecó	Fl(2+1) W 30s	70	G0942	110-19536	25.9
Coig Lighthouse		1948	Güer Aike Department	LFl(2) W 25s	78	G1222	110-20068	13.1
Punta Guzmán Lighthouse		1928	Deseado Department	Fl(2) W 12s	33	G1136	110-19916	13.9
Isla Leones Lighthouse		1917	Chubut Province	Fl W 10s				
Isla Pingüino Lighthouse		1903	Deseado Department	Fl(2) W 16s	60	G1152	110-19940	12
Isla Rasa Lighthouse		1917	Florentino Ameghino Department	Fl W 8s	23	G1092	110-19768	9.3
Le Maire Lighthouse		1926	Ushuaia Department	Fl(3) W 32s	47	G1280	110-20272	8.9
Magallanes Lighthouse		1976	Río Grande Department	Fl(3) W 50s	53	G1260.5	110-20156	12
Mar Chiquita lighthouse		1932	Mar Chiquita Partido	Fl(2) W 15s	21	G0912	110-19430	14.7
Martín García Lighthouse		1897	La Plata Partido	Fl(2) Y 10s	10	G0791	110-19292	6
Miramar Lighthouse		1988	Miramar	Fl W 5s	78	G0922	110-19475	12
Monte Loayza Lighthouse		18 Jul 1946	Santa Cruz Province					
Morro Nuevo Lighthouse		1918	Chubut Province	Fl W 5s	118	G1058	110-19664	12.7
Punta Bajos Lighthouse		2001	Viedma Department	Fl W 3s	27	G1052	110-19656	13.5
Punta Delgada Lighthouse		1904	Punta Delgada	Fl(2+1) W 25s	71	G1054	110-19660	28
Punta Lobos Lighthouse		1948	Florentino Ameghino Department	Fl(2) W 15s	145	G1080	110-19740	13.7
Punta Medanosa Lighthouse		1949	Deseado Department	Fl(2) W 11s	29	G1154	110-19948	10
Punta Mogotes Lighthouses		1891	Buenos Aires Province, Mar del Plata	Fl W 19s	55	G0913	110-19472	25
Punta Médanos Lighthouse		1893	La Costa Partido	LFl(5) W 40s	68	G0908	110-19424	28
Punta Ninfas Lighthouse		1916	Rawson Department	Fl(2) W 20s	90	G1074	110-19668	11
Punta Norte Lighthouse		1917	Chubut Province	Fl W 10s	62.5	G1050	110-19652	14.3
Punta Piedras Lighthouse		1917	Buenos Aires Province	Fl W 9s	42	G0900	110-19403	15.1
Recalada a Bahía Blanca Light		1906	Monte Hermoso Partido	Fl W 9s	75	G0986	110-19540	28
Punta Hewison Lighthouse			Tierra del Fuego, Antarctica and South Atlantic Islands Province					
Punta Tehuelche Lighthouse		1949	Chubut Province	Fl(2) W 20s	35	G1048.8	110-19636	10.8
Páramo Lighthouse		1924	Río Grande Department	Fl W 7.5s	22.5	G1261	110-20160	10.3
Rio Negro Lighthouse		1887	Río Negro Province	Fl(2) W 20s	43.5	G1028	110-19588	16
Cabo San Diego Lighthouse		1934	Ushuaia Department	Fl(3) W 32s	40	G1276	110-20264	13.2
San Gonzalo Lighthouse		1928	Ushuaia Department	Fl W 10s	38	G1288	110-20300	7.2
Bahía San Gregorio Lighthouse		1968	Florentino Ameghino Department	Fl W 5.1s	172	G1089.4	110-19764	13.5
Cabo San Jorge Lighthouse		1925	Florentino Ameghino Department	Fl 4 W 32s	78	G1104	110-19792	14
San José Lighthouse		1917	Florentino Ameghino Department	Fl WR 5s	84	G1086	110-19748	9.3
San Matías Lighthouse		1924	San Antonio Department	Fl(2) W 11s	42	G1031	110-19596	12
San Sebastian Lighthouse		1949	Río Grande Department	Fl(3) W 40s	60	G1262	110-20192	13.6
Santa Cruz Lighthouse		1923	Corpen Aike Department	LFl(4) W 60s	157	G1210.1	110-20020	12.9
Segunda Barranca Lighthouse		1914	Carmen de Patagones	Fl(3) W 22s	38.5	G1024	110-19584	27.2
Bicentennial Lighthouse		2011	Sarmiento Park					
Buen Suceso Lighthouse			Ushuaia Department	Fl(2) W 16s	57	G1277	110-20284	9
Stella Maris Lighthouse		1949	Concepción del Uruguay	Fl W 4s	14			
Zeballos Lighthouse			Tierra del Fuego, Antarctica and South Atlantic Islands Province	Fl W 4s	12	G1329.5	111-2570	7
Cabo Corrientes Lighthouse				Fl W 10s	75	G0915	110-19436	10
Chica Lighthouse				L Fl W 10s	16	G0993	110-19552	7
Davison Lighthouse				Fl(2) W 16s	8	G1300	111-2710.07	6
Escarpados Lighthouse				Fl W 10s	59	G1323.6	111-2616	6
Isla Martillo Lighthouse				Fl W 7s	8	G1308	111-2700	7
Las Grutas Lighthouse				Iso W 2s	71	G1045	110-19626	10
Punta Atalaya Lighthouse				Fl W 6s	25	G0896	110-19316	10
Punta Colorada Lighthouse				L Fl (2) W 10s	54	G1046.3	110-19628	12
Punta Espora Lighthouse				Fl W 4s	16	G1311	111-2684	8
Punta Mackinlay Lighthouse				Fl R 2s	9	G1310	111-2696	6
Punta Observatorio Lighthouse				Fl W 2s	10	G1325	111-2580	7
Punta Quiroga Lighthouse				Fl W 10s	40	G1047	110-19632	11
Río Luján Lighthouse				Fl R 5s	14	G0860.2	110-19402.8	8
Buenos Aires Lighthouse		1999	Puerto Madero	Fl W 3s	90	G0846		
Piedra Diamante Lighthouse				Fl(2) W 6s	18	G0789	110-19284	11
Cámara Lighthouse			Cámara Base	Fl W 10s	18	G1387.6	111-2724	6
Potter Cove Lighthouse			Potter Cove	Fl W 7s	10	G1387.7	111-2725	3
Destacamento Lighthouse			Orcadas Station	Fl W 3s		G1378.5	110-20363.2	

== Beacons ==
Name	Location	Coordinates
Isla Bermejo Beacon	Buenos Aires Province	
Isla del Embudo Beacon	Buenos Aires Province	
Punta Lobos Beacon	Buenos Aires Province	
Teniente Sahores Beacon	Tierra del Fuego, Antarctica and South Atlantic Islands Province	
Guardiamarina Lamas Beacon	Tierra del Fuego, Antarctica and South Atlantic Islands Province	
Arroyo Las Vizcachas Beacon	Buenos Aires Province	
Gobernación Marítima de Tierra del Fuego Beacon	Tierra del Fuego, Antarctica and South Atlantic Islands Province	

== See also ==
- Lists of lighthouses
