= Cape San Pablo =

Cape in Tierra del Fuego Province, Argentina

Coordinates: 54.2825°S 66.6917°W

Cape San Pablo Cabo San Pablo
- Headland
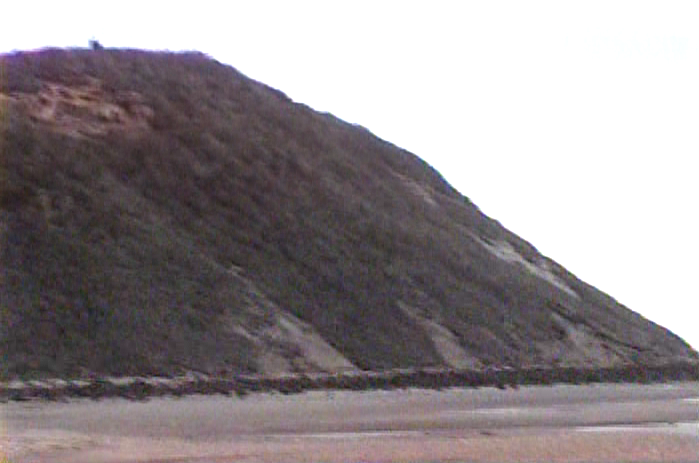
- Cape San Pablo

- Coordinates
- Location: Tierra del Fuego, Argentina

Cape San Pablo is a landform located in the Argentine Sea that belongs to the South Atlantic Ocean and is located in the east part of Tierra del Fuego island, the southernmost region of South America. It belongs to the Río Grande Department, in the province of Tierra del Fuego, Antarctica and South Atlantic Islands, located in southern Patagonia. It is located at coordinates: 54 ° 16'57.98 "S 66 ° 41'30.99" W, about 50 km south-east of the city of Rio Grande.

== Physical geography and boundaries ==
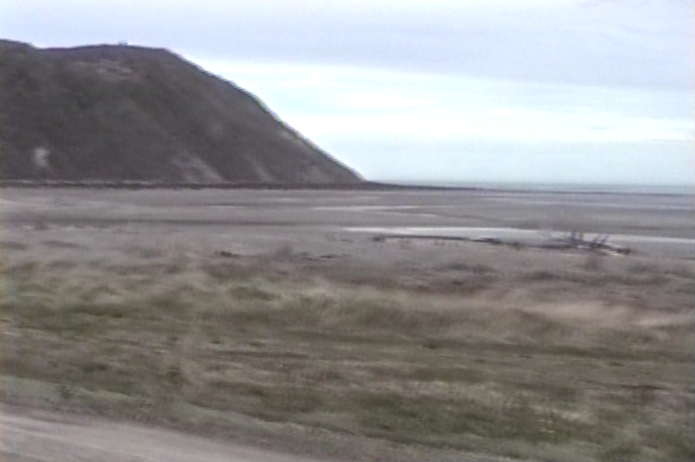
Cape San Pablo, low tide.

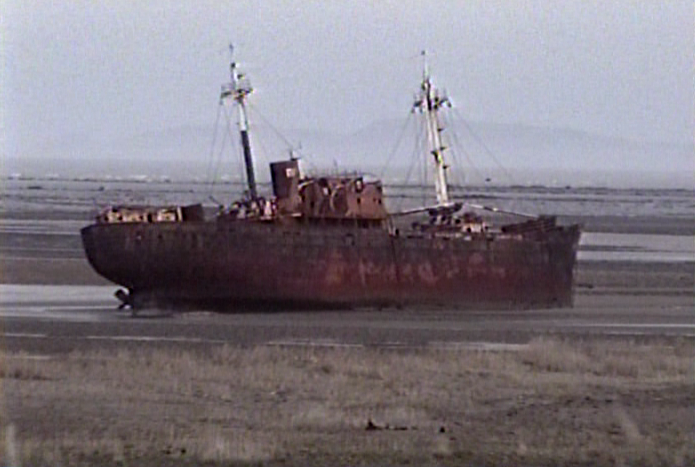
The «Desdémona» wreck, south of cape San Pablo, low tide.

Cape San Pablo is an isolated mountain with a rounded shape. It is made of sedimentary rocks from the Cenozoic Era. The cape spreads across 1,200 metres at hide tide, but the distance decreases significantly at low tide. To the north, there is a bay called “Quemada” (English: Burned) together with another one much deeper bay named cove "San Pablo", which is delimited at the north by the cape "Ladrillero" and the "Champion rock" in the same area where the river "Ladrillero" flows into the sea. Cape San Pablo has another sea entrance to the south that exposes the seabed at low tide. This area contains a huge wreck, the "Desdemona", a cargo ship made in Germany. In this shallow bay, the San Pablo river flows into the sea. The southern limit of this area is called Gruesa point. The climate is semi-humid, with an annual average temperature of about 6 °C, and annual rainfall (uniformly distributed) of about 350 mm. In the Papadakis classification, its climate is defined as “wet Patagonian”. Strong winds occurs throughout the year, especially during the spring, blowing mainly from the west and south-west quadrants. The coast is usually cliffed but it is also surrounded by lower coastal areas which consist of sand, silt and abundant pebbles. Tidal differences can be remarkable.

The island contains a broad region of ecotone forest at its centre, which separates the other forests on the south of the island from the northern Magellanic steppe sector, belonging to the fueguino patagonian phytogeographic district of the Patagonian phytogeographic province. These forests are included in the subantarctic phytogeographical deciduous forest district of the subantarctic phytogeographic province. They are composed by two tree species, Lenga (Nothofagus pumilio) and the Antarctic Beech (Nothofagus antarctica).

== Lighthouse ==
At the top of the isolated mountain that forms the cape is the Cape San Pablo Lighthouse operated by the Argentine Navy. It works automatically, since there are no staff present in the building. The construction of this lighthouse concluded in March 1945.

== Access ==
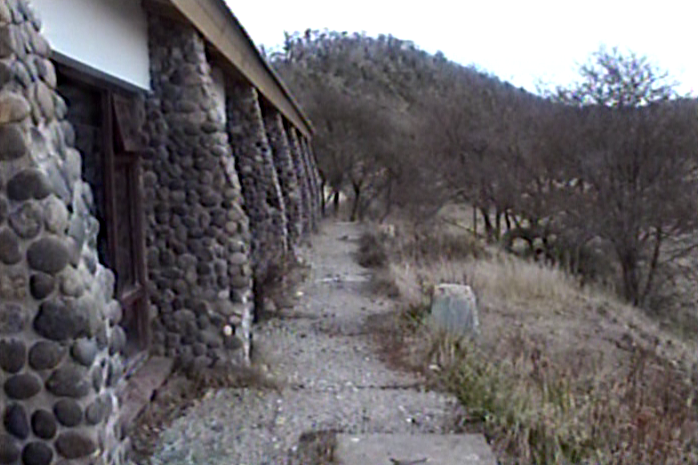
The abandoned inn «Hostería San Pablo».

Access to cape San Pablo is through national route 3 and then provincial road 24CA (known as "A" road) to the east.

The cape is located in the fields belonging to "La Fueguina" ranch. There is an inn called "Hostería San Pablo" along the south side of the cape, but it is currently abandoned.
