= Julius Popper =

Argentine explorer and major perpetrator of the Selkʼnam genocide

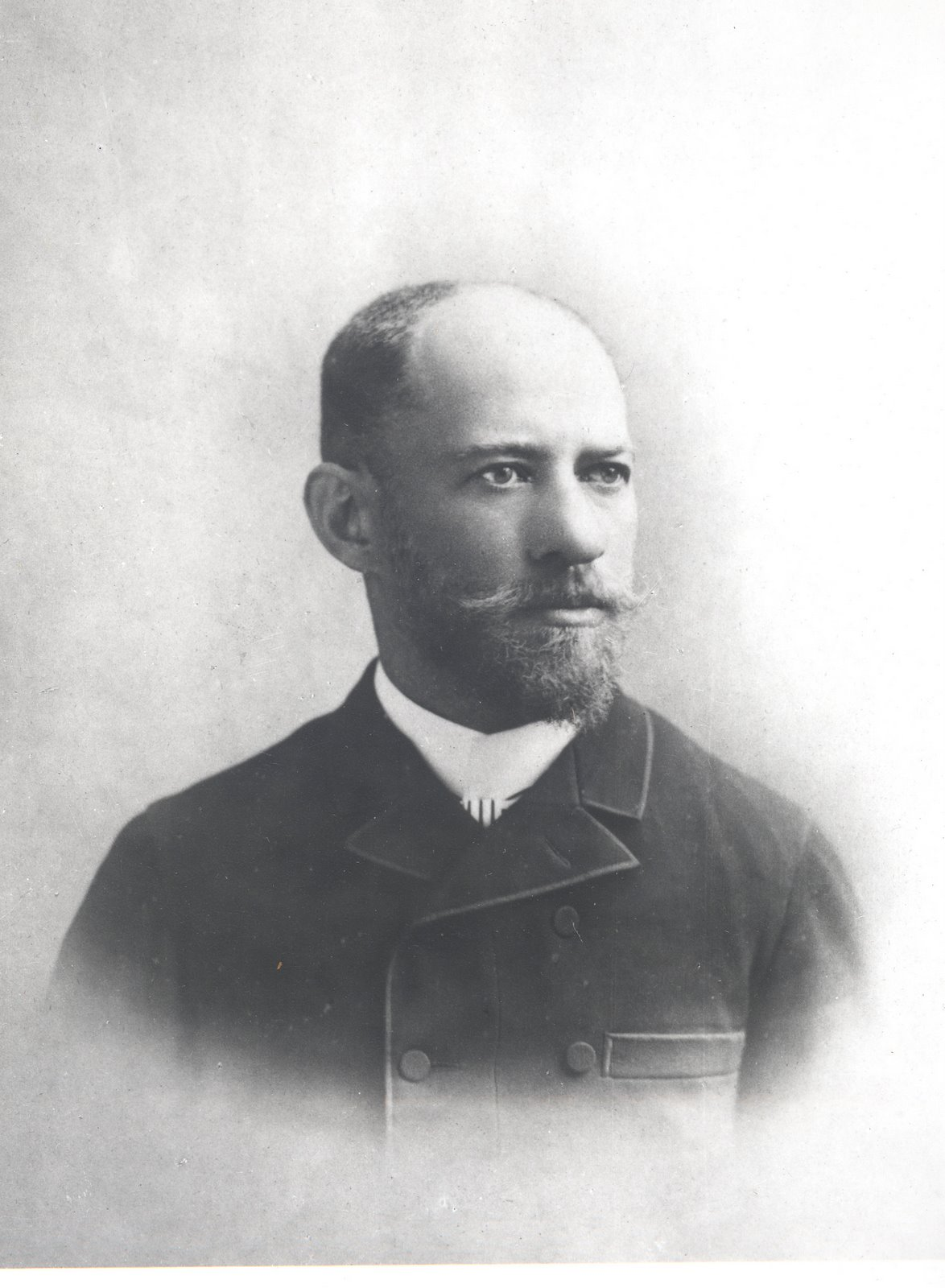
- Born: December 15, 1857; Bucharest, Wallachia
- Died: June 5, 1893 (aged 35); Buenos Aires, Argentina
- Other name: Julio Popper
- Known for: Major perpetrator of the Selkʼnam genocide

Julius Popper (December 15, 1857 – June 5, 1893; known in Spanish as Julio Popper (Spanish pronunciation: [ˈxuljo poˈpeɾ])), a Romanian-born Argentine colonial engineer and explorer, known as a modern "conquistador" of Tierra del Fuego in southern South America, became both a controversial and influential figure as one of the main perpetrators of the genocide of the native Selkʼnam people in the Tierra del Fuego archipelago, and the circumstances surrounding his own death remain a mystery.

== Life ==
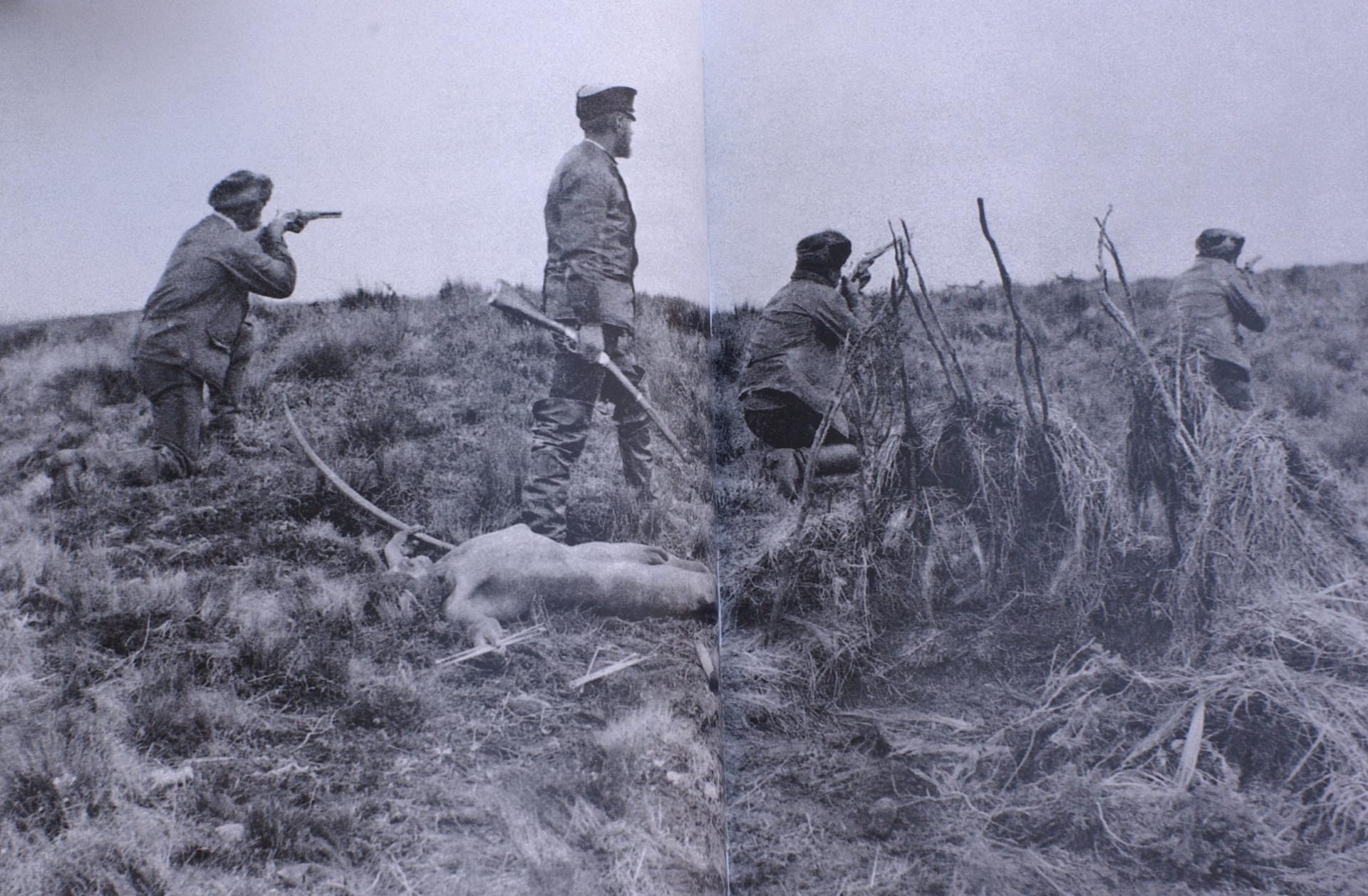
Julius Popper posing over a dead Selkʼnam killed during fight in 1886

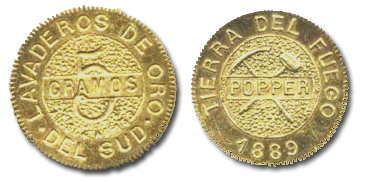
5-gram gold coin

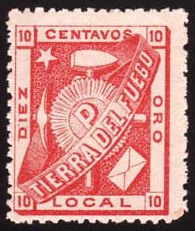
1891 stamp by Popper

Popper was born in 1857 to a Jewish family in Bucharest, Principality of Wallachia, son of professor Neftali Popper, a successful antiques merchant, and his wife Peppi. He studied in Paris, gaining credentials as an engineer.

After working in Europe for several years, he took a job working on the infrastructure for the telegraph in Chile. He arrived in Argentina in 1885, where he was attracted by the possibility of gold mining in Tierra del Fuego. In 1886, he received a permit from the Argentine Government to form an exploration company to mine for gold near San Sebastián. On September 7, he led an 18-man expedition that included a chief engineer, a mineralogist, a journalist and a photographer. They found gold dust on the beach of El Páramo, in San Sebastián Bay. The expedition was rigorously and strictly enforced according to military standards with heavily armed men, with Popper in direct command of everything.

During the expedition, Popper and his men were allegedly attacked by eighty Selkʼnam (Ona) armed with bows. The expeditionaries responded by firing their Winchester rifles, killing all but two of the Selkʼnam. After the fight, Popper "posed his men in the attitude of troops repelling a charge, took a position himself astride one of the dead Indians, and then had the outfit photographed for subsequent use."

Popper succeeded in unearthing large amounts of gold and his Compania de Lavaderos de Oro del Sud realized enormous capital gains on the Argentine stock exchange. A mint built to manage the gold was adapted as a museum in 1973, Museo del Fin del Mundo ("Museum at the End of the Earth"), officially the Museo Territorial (Territorial Museum) of Tierra del Fuego since 1979.

In Patagonia, Popper maintained dominance with his private army. He issued his own coins and stamps to symbolize his power. Two varieties of coins were issued, the 1 gram coin inscribed with El Paramo ("a high and cold region"), and the 5 gram coin inscribed with Lavaderos de Oro del Sur ("Washers of Gold of the south"), referring to gold panning from the river sediment. When the Argentine peso lost its value in the market crash of 1890, his gold coins were regarded as currency. Around this time, he may have produced plans for the modern outline of the city of Havana, Cuba.

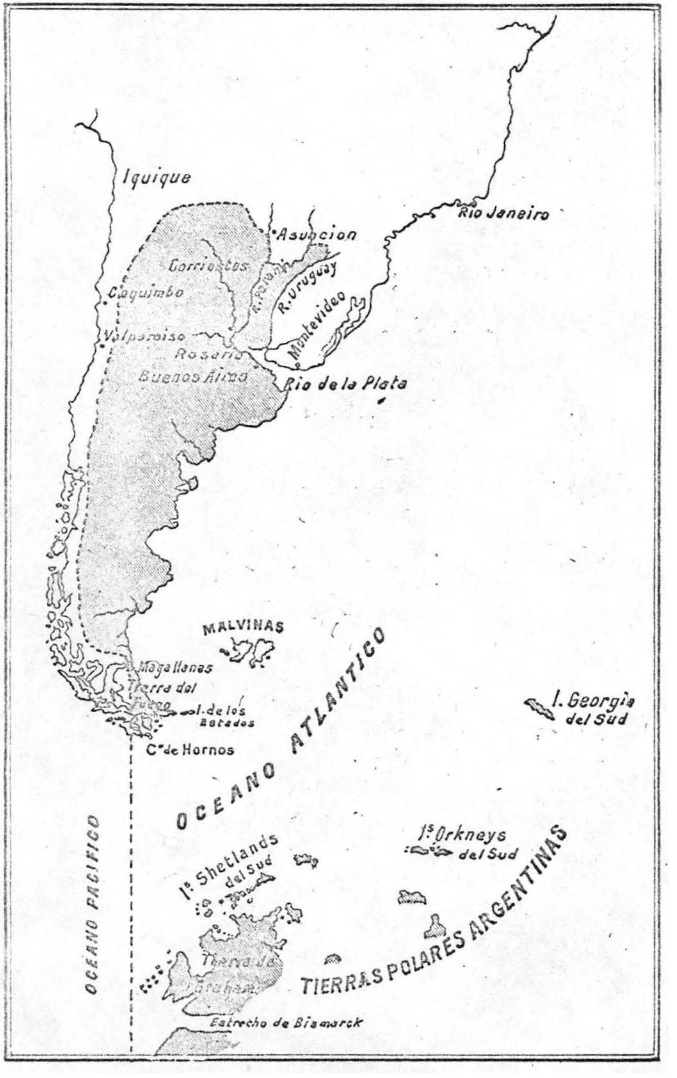
Popper's "Argentine Polar Lands" proposal.

Popper vigorously fought against his enemies; he punished gold diggers and thieves according to arbitrary law. The most controversial aspect of his life was his participation in the Selkʼnam genocide against the native communities on Tierra del Fuego. Sheep farmers and gold miners ruthlessly killed them; the former because the Selkʼnam would hunt sheep in their former territories, and the latter because of conflicts over mining areas. Together with other bounty hunters, who were paid to kill the Selkʼnam, Popper too sent his armed forces to manhunt them.

Popper also prepared an expedition to enforce the Argentine claim to parts of Antarctica. In 1892, he submitted a proposal to the Argentine government to build a settlement in the South Shetland Islands, accompanied by a map showing his plans for the region. Popper claimed the region was of strategic importance and that Argentina needed to take possession of it "as soon as possible". British diplomat George E. Welby took notice of this proposal and contacted Popper to assert that South Georgia, which had been marked as Argentine in his map, was a British possession.

After Popper's sudden death in Buenos Aires at the age of 35, his empire collapsed. The cause of his death has not been established. Contemporary American journalist John R. Spears says that he was poisoned by "men whom he had offended in the south." Popper's death was seen as suspicious due to his relatively young age and good health.

== Photographic archive ==
In July 2022 The Wilhelm Filderman Center for the Study of the History of the Jews of Romania mounted in the Romanian capital, Bucharest, an exhibition of Popper's 1886 expedition into the interior of Tierra del Fuego. It consisted of a selection of the hundreds of photographs of the expedition that Popper himself sent to his family in Bucharest at the time, and which collection had previously been conserved in the Romanian National Archives.

== In fiction ==
- Patricio Manns features him as one of the main characters of his novel, El Corazón a Contraluz (1996).
- Popper figures in the back-story to the 1956 short story "Tierra del Fuego" by Francisco Coloane. In 2000, this story was turned into a film of the same name. In the film, Popper (played by Jorge Perugorría) appears as an ethnic Romanian Eastern Orthodox man working for Queen Carmen Sylva.
- The Concepción-based Chilean blues and rockabilly band Julius Popper are named after Popper.
