= Recalada a Bahía Blanca Light =

Recalada a Bahía Blanca
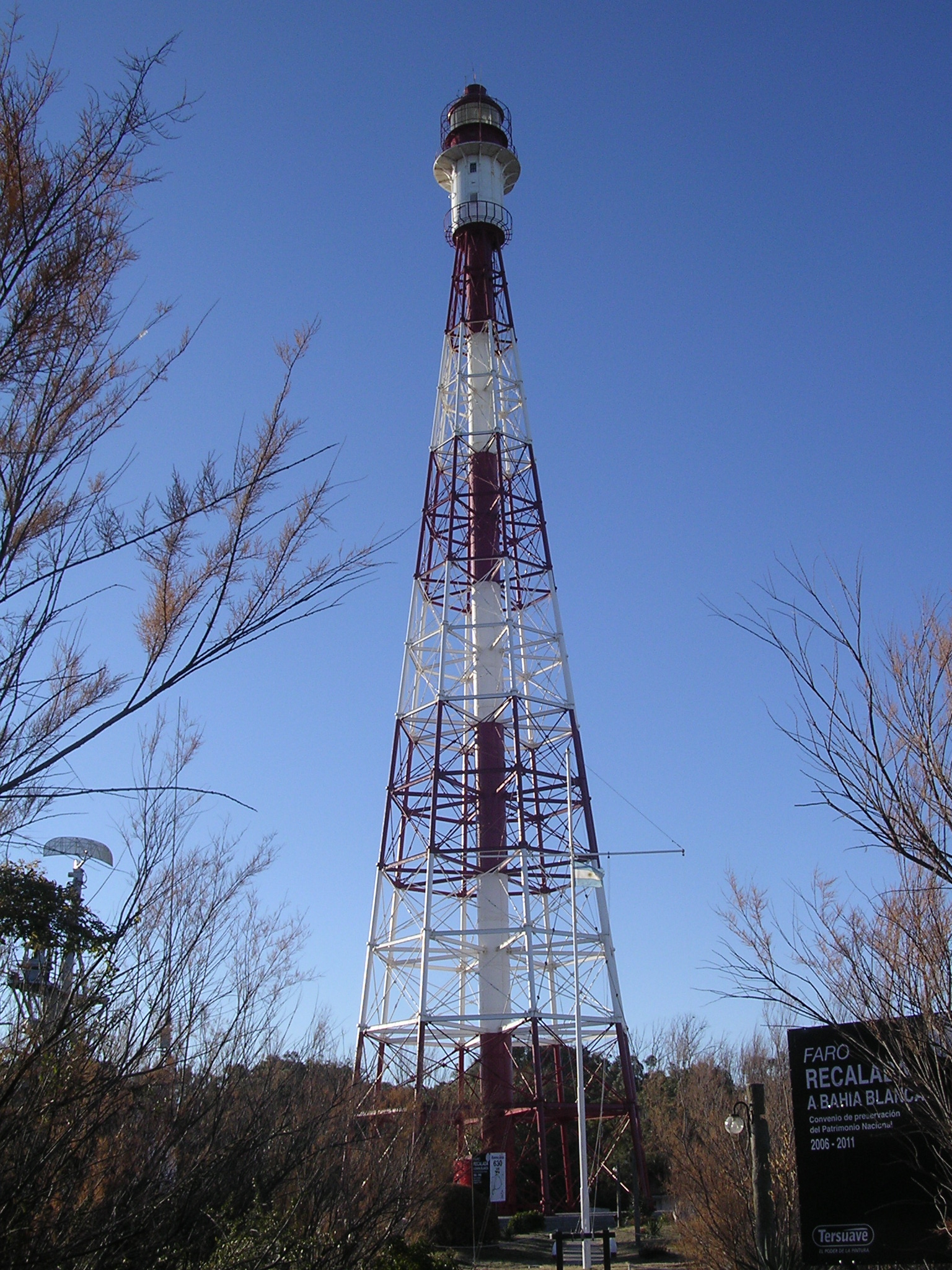
- Recalada a Bahía Blanca Light
- Location: Monte Hermoso; Argentina
- Coordinates: 38°59′26.74″S 61°15′35.85″W

Tower
- Constructed: 1906
- Construction: cast iron
- Height: 220 feet (67 m)
- Shape: octagonal pyramidal skeletal tower with central cylinder
- Markings: red and white horizontal bands
- Heritage: National historical monument of Argentina

Light
- Focal height: 245 feet (75 m)
- Range: 28 nautical miles (52 km; 32 mi)
- Characteristic: Fl W 9 s.

Recalada a Bahía Blanca Light, also known as Monte Hermoso Light or simply Recalada Light (lit. landfall), is an active lighthouse in Monte Hermoso, Buenos Aires Province, Argentina, marking the entrance to the Bahía Blanca. At a height of 220 feet (67 m) it is the eleventh-tallest "traditional lighthouse" in the world, as well as the tallest lighthouse in the Southern Hemisphere and the tallest lighthouse built of metal in the lattice tower configuration

== History ==
The tower was prefabricated in France by the same company that built the Eiffel Tower. It was first lit on 1 January 1906.

In 1928 a Dalén light was installed. The light was replaced with an electric light 1974. An Automatic Identification System (AIS) beacon was installed on 1 January 2006.

== Construction ==
It consists of a central cylinder of iron, 1.5 metres (4 ft 11 in) in diameter and eight cast-iron columns. There are a total of 331 steps.

== Visiting ==
The light station is staffed and the tower is open to guided tours.

== See also ==
- List of tallest lighthouses in the world
- List of lighthouses in Argentina
