= Top Gear: Patagonia Special =

Special episode of Top Gear

- Directed by: James Bryce
- Presented by: Jeremy Clarkson; Richard Hammond; James May; The Stig
- Country of origin: United Kingdom

Production
- Executive producer: Andy Wilman
- Producer: Chris Hale
- Running time: 120 minutes (60 minutes per part)
- Production company: BBC Entertainment Production

Original release
- Network: BBC Two
- Release: 27 December – 28 December 2014

Related
- Top Gear

Top Gear: Patagonia Special is a full length special that was aired as a two-part episode for the BBC car show Top Gear; the first part was aired on 27 December 2014, while the second part was aired a day later on 28 December. The special sees hosts, Jeremy Clarkson, Richard Hammond, and James May, using a selection of cars with V8 engines to celebrate the 60th anniversary of the small-block V8 engine, on a journey across Chile and Argentina, starting from Bariloche and ending on the outskirts of Ushuaia, and includes a violent assault by protesters that the presenters and their film crew encountered. It is the last Top Gear special to be filmed with the hosts, prior to Clarkson's exit from the show in March 2015 followed by Hammond, May, and Executive Producer Andy Wilman shortly afterwards. The incident with the protesters was widely documented and reported by the media, prior to the broadcast of the special.

Unlike previous specials, despite each part doing well to draw in viewers during Christmas week it was aired on, it received mixed reviews from fans and critics, many of whom felt that it was not as entertaining as past specials by the hosts, largely due to the aforementioned controversy.

== Summary ==
All three presenters met in an area near Bariloche, where they brought and compared their cars. Clarkson had bought a Porsche 928, which both Hammond and May berated for being "boring". Hammond had bought a Ford Mustang, which though both Clarkson and May initially liked, they pointed out the numerous flaws with the car, in that most of the car's features were "pointless". May, arriving last, had bought a Lotus Esprit, a decision that both Clarkson and Hammond were stunned by; both proceeded to ridicule May for his choice of vehicle, citing the Esprit's famed unreliability and poor craftsmanship. The producers then presented them with a challenge: they were to drive from Bariloche to Butch Cassidy's house. Amazed by the apparent ease of their challenge, the three set off towards their destination.

Though May and Clarkson enjoyed the journey, Hammond's Mustang struggled, with poor steering and heavy fuel consumption, causing him to break down a mile and a half from the destination and be abandoned by May and Clarkson. When Hammond caught them up, they were informed by producers that they must continue driving southward to Ushuaia. Once there, they were to play a game of football using their cars.

Their route to Ushuaia - planned by Jeremy - took many odd turns along the way. The trio took a side road that ended up leading them to a strange area where the road essentially disappeared. Eventually, they encountered an unstable bridge which they had to cross in their cars. May was the first to cross, who discovered that the end of the bridge led to a dead end, though chose not to inform Clarkson or Hammond about it. Around this time, the presenters noticed that a Citroën 2CV had been following them, allowing them to realise this was the back-up car if one of theirs was to fail.

After heading back, they encountered a swamp, which bogged down the Mustang and the Porsche. Clarkson admitted that the Lotus had been performing better than anyone had expected, as it had not suffered any breakdowns thus far. After stopping at their hotel for the night, Hammond became extremely upset with his drive along the route and sought to take control, taking them on a different route where he believed the roads would be better. This route, however, ended up taking them on worse terrain than before, causing all three cars to struggle and Clarkson's Porsche to break down due to an electrical fault. May became frustrated by Hammond after the accommodation was a campsite and there being a big cow for dinner. Though he managed to fix the fault, Hammond was stripped of his leadership and Clarkson took back control of the route.

When setting off the next morning, the trio found a large, desolate area which they used as a race circuit. When attempting to relocate the road, they discovered that their route had been blocked by a fence, meaning the cars could not continue and that the journey would have to continue on foot. Clarkson, in protest of this, found some nearby horses to ride, though when May fell and cracked three ribs, the presenters abandoned this idea and located another route. On the way to the overnight hotel, May is infuriated and in pain, but then Clarkson gets payback when his alternator belt breaks causing him to be left without electricity. The presenters fix and modified their cars to allow them to carry building materials.

At a nearby town, Punta Arenas, the team stop for supplies in preparation for their football game, though end up using most of their supplies to drive across a nearby beach filled with boulders and other various rocks, where they were landed by a commercial Chilean ship, which could not transport the three directly to Ushuaia for political reasons. Shortly before arriving in Ushuaia, Hammond's Mustang broke down again in the snow, leaving May and Clarkson to continue in belief that Hammond would follow them in the 2CV. May and Clarkson crossed a nearby river, after which Hammond joined them in the Mustang for the final straight to Ushuaia.

Prior to the trio's arrival in Ushuaia, the residents of the town got word of their upcoming arrival. Preparations were made by the residents to protest their arrival. The trio had received news about the protests which prompted them to check into a nearby hotel, but there were a small number of Falklands War veterans gathered outside of the building with a nationalistic designed van, which had "Las Malvinas son Argentinas!" ("The Falklands are Argentinian!") written on it. Protesters entered the hotel, followed by the local police. The protesters noted that if the crew didn't cease filming, then they would have to cause trouble.

The locals had taken offense to the license plate of the Porsche, which read "H982 FKL". The protesters believed that the number plate was a direct reference to the 1982 Falklands War fought between Argentina and the United Kingdom, and that it was a fake, deliberately designed for this specific trip to their country. The show's producers attempted to negotiate with Argentinian officials saying that the number plate was not fake (something that was later proven to be correct), but offered a compromise that the number plate would be removed before the game of car football. Attempts to placate the officials were unsuccessful; in fact, if anything, the attempts to reason with the officials may have escalated the scenario even further as, shortly afterwards, Clarkson received word from the producers that they had been ordered by the officials to leave the Tierra del Fuego area immediately.

It was estimated that it would have taken 24 hours to organise a full departure from Ushuaia, but protesters warned that there would be violence if they had not departed in under 3 hours. The crew made a hasty departure, though the presenters initially had to remain in the hotel. They then went to a nearby airport, together with the two female crew members, and flew out as it was assumed the rest of the crew would be left without the presenters accompanying them. The crew were to be escorted by the police to the border town of San Sebastián, however, they had barely managed a fifth of their 185 miles (298 km) journey when they began to realise that a few protesters had managed to find the convoy on motorbikes and were searching for the Porsche with the offending license plate which turned out to be the main trigger of the protest.

As they neared to the town of Tolhuin, the police warned them that a large mob had prepared for their arrival, and, more worryingly, were organising a blockade. As they drove through the town, they discovered the main road blocked by a large truck, slowing the convoy down allowing the protesters to begin egging the cars and pelting them with rocks. Several car windows were shattered and two crew members were hit. After a while they pulled over to attend to the injured crew members and repair the windows. Since the Porsche was inevitably going to attract more trouble wherever they went, the crew decided to leave behind all of the presenters' cars.

As they continued, they received word that an even larger mob, containing about 300 cars, was awaiting the crew in Río Grande. Fearing for their safety, the entire convoy moved cross-country, leaving the main road; the police escort meanwhile stayed behind on the main road to cover their backs in case the mob discovered their ruse. Arriving at the river border crossed previously, the crew were to illegally cross the border into Chile, which they were all able to do successfully. Once in Chile, their escape had been completed, leaving Clarkson, May and Hammond to pay a Butch Cassidy-esque homage to Patagonia.

== Filming ==
Filming of the Patagonia Special commenced after the three presenters first arrived in Buenos Aires on 17 September 2014, and made it to the starting point in Bariloche on 19 September. The filming for the two-part episode involved a crew of around 40 people, and was completed by 1 October.

== Reception ==
Viewing figures for both parts were exceptionally good, with the first part attracting overall UK viewing figures of 7.21 million, while the second part was slightly higher with overall UK viewing figures reaching 7.38 million; in January 2015, the first part of the Patagonia Special was reported as being the most watched show on BBC iPlayer during the week of Christmas, achieving 2.1 million requests for it, while the second part only achieved 1.5 million requests, but became the third-most requested show on the iPlayer.

Despite good viewing figures, the show drew mixed reviews from critics. Gerard O'Donovan of The Telegraph wrote a favourable review for both parts, each earning a four star rating, with the critic declaring that he enjoyed both parts, and that the ending of the second part "left us in no doubt how serious the situation in Tierra del Fuego had got back in September." Ian Burrell of The Independent was also generally favourable of the ending for the special. Fans of the show also gave mixed reactions on Twitter following the broadcast of the two parts, but were generally positive about its ending.

== Controversy ==
Jeremy Clarkson's Porsche 928 GT, bearing the controversial "H982 FKL" number plate.

Filming for the episode garnered widespread media attention after an incident occurred in which the presenters and film crew became the target of a group of protesters when close to Ushuaia, who saw the number plate on the Porsche being driven by Clarkson, "H982 FKL", as a reference to the Falklands War and the year it took place, but in reality, it was a random number plate chosen by the manufacturer. Comments on Twitter, discovered by a member of the crew during the start of filming, led to the replacement of the vehicle's original plate to one reading "H1 VAE" as they neared the city.

The change of plate did little to help, as the group encountered the protesters on 2 October 2014, after being forced into a hotel upon hearing news of the growing protests of their arrival; had it not occurred, or the controversial incident in general, filming would have continued for three more days in Ushuaia before the presenters and crew left. Discussions between the show's producers and representatives of the protesters failed to achieve calm with the growing tensions, leading to the group being forced to leave the country as a result; the presenters left with the women of the film crew for Buenos Aires, while the rest of the team were forced to drive back to the border with Chile with their equipment, taking the presenters' cars with them before eventually abandoning them during their retreat.

The episode featured footage that included the moment that they were ambushed and became the target of an attack, with stones from protesters causing damage to their cars and resulting in two crew members being injured.

Following the incident, Andy Wilman, executive producer for the show at the time, stated on 2 October that "Top Gear production purchased three cars for a forthcoming programme; to suggest that this car was either chosen for its number plate, or that an alternative number plate was substituted for the original is completely untrue"; on the same day, Clarkson tweeted that the number plate had been a coincidence and that "for once, we did nothing wrong." Clarkson later wrote an article for The Sunday Times in which he stated that he "had to hide under a bed" due to "a mob howling for his blood". He regarded the incident as "the most terrifying thing I've ever been involved in." According to the UK registry, the plate "H982 FKL" has been registered to the Porsche since its manufacture in May 1991. Later that month, on 31 October, Argentine ambassador Alicia Castro demanded a formal apology for the incident when she met with Danny Cohen, the BBC Director of Television, which was refused by the BBC after they stated their intention to broadcast the two-part special as a fair representation of the events that occurred. On 28 May 2015, the BBC Trust ruled that there was not a "cover-up" with the number plate and that it had not been a deliberate reference to the Falklands War, taking no further action as a direct result of its own ruling.

The number-plate controversy was later lampooned by the hosts during a feature in Australia, where the cars' number plates were very tenuously linked to anti-republican themes.

In 2016 Clarkson tweeted "Happy Christmas to everyone. Except the Tierra Del Fuego people of Argentina. You lot can sod off." This came after an incident where Clarkson missed an airline flight in Stuttgart, Germany, which he claimed was caused by an airline worker purposefully impeding him, stating, "I'm from Argentina..."

For the following series of Top Gear, in a show of gratitude for the sanctuary provided to the crew, some references were made to Chile;

- The three presenters wore pins bearing the Chilean flag on the first episode of the series
- In the second episode, an introduction to a segment featured a photograph of Alexis Sanchez.
- The third episode's news segment featured mugs with the Chilean flag on.
- In the fifth episode, an introduction to a segment showed Chilean flag bunting behind the presenters.

The Ford, Porsche and Lotus were kept in police custody until 2017, when they were destroyed to prevent further protests.
