= Papadakis =

Papadakis (Greek: Παπαδάκης) is a Greek surname. The female version is Papadaki (Greek: Παπαδάκη).

Notable people with surname include:

- Andreas Papadakis (1938–2008), Cypriot-born British academic and architectural publisher
  - Papadakis Publisher, British publisher
- Antonios Papadakis (1810–1878), Greek businessman and benefactor to the University of Athens
- Antonis Papadakis (1893–1980), Greek musician
- Christína Papadáki (born 1973), Greek tennis player
- Constantine Papadakis (1946–2009), Greek-American businessman and president of Drexel University
- Dimitris Papadakis (born 1966), Cypriot politician and MEP
- Eleni Papadaki (1903–1944), Greek actress
- Gabriella Papadakis (born 1995), French ice dancer
- Konstantinos Papadakis (pianist) (born 1972), Greek pianist
- Konstantinos Papadakis (politician) (born 1975), Greek politician and MEP
- Konstantinos Papadakis (basketball) (born 1998), Greek basketball player
- Kostas Papadakis (violinist) (1920–2003), Greek folk violinist
- Nick Papadakis (born 1943), Canadian soccer player
- Petros Papadakis (born 1977), American football player and radio host
- Iosif Papadakis (born 1960), Greek Astrophysiscist at the University of Crete

== Fictional ==
- Hannie Papadakis, a character from The Baby-sitters Club
