= Cape San Pablo Lighthouse =

Lighthouse in Tierra del Fuego Province, Argentina

Cape San Pablo
- Location: Cape San Pablo; Argentina
- Coordinates: 54.285811°S 66.697176°W

Tower
- Constructed: 1945 (first)
- Foundation: concrete base
- Construction: steel tower
- Height: 6 feet (1.8 m)
- Shape: square pyramidal skeletal tower
- Markings: rectangular black and yellow daymark
- Power source: solar power

Light
- First lit: 1966 (current)
- Deactivated: 1949
- Focal height: 136.5 feet (41.6 m)
- Range: 12.5 nautical miles (23.2 km; 14.4 mi)
- Characteristic: Fl (2) W 20s

The Cape San Pablo Lighthouse is located 50 km south-east of the city of Río Grande, in the department of Río Grande, Tierra del Fuego Province, Argentina. It is situated on Cape San Pablo at a very characteristic isolated mountain that is a prominent formation on the coast line.

== History ==
The construction of the lighthouse started on March 15, 1945. In December 1949, there was a seismic movement that bent the tower. This situation forced the removal of the illumination equipment and the deactivation of the signal. In 1966, the rebuilding of the lighthouse was organized. Nowadays, the lighthouse consists of a yellow pyramid-shaped tower, 6 meters in height, with a black triangle with its vertex upside down. There is a platform located at the top section which holds a luminance lantern fuelled by solar energy having an optic range of 12.5 nautical miles.

== See also ==
- List of lighthouses in Argentina
- Tierra del Fuego
- The Lighthouse at the End of the World
