= Papadakis Publisher =

British independent book publisher

- Founded: 1997
- Founder: Andreas Papadakis; Alexandra Papadakis
- Country of origin: United Kingdom
- Headquarters location: Winterbourne, Berkshire
- Distribution: GMC Distribution (UK); ACC Distribution (US); Peribo (Australia)
- Publication types: Books
- Nonfiction topics: Art, Science, Photography, Architecture
- Official website: www.papadakis.net

Papadakis Publisher is an independent art, architecture and natural science book publisher founded in London, United Kingdom, by Andreas Papadakis and his daughter Alexandra Papadakis. Since 1968, Papadakis Publisher and its predecessor Academy Editions have published more than a thousand titles, on art, architecture, science and the decorative arts.

== History ==
Greek Cypriot-born British academic and entrepreneur Andreas Papadakis opened the Academy Bookshop in Holland Street, Kensington in 1964 and moved into publishing as Academy Editions in 1968. From then until 1990, when the company was sold to VCH Germany (now part of John Wiley) Academy published more than a thousand titles mainly on art, architecture and the decorative arts. The company was the first to publish many international architects in the 'Architectural Monographs No...' series, which included Alvar Aalto (No 4), Michael Graves (No 5), Edwin Lutyens (No 6), John Soane (No 8), Terry Farrell (No 9), Richard Rogers (No 10), Mies van der Rohe (No 11), Hassan Fathy (No 13), Tadao Ando (No 14), Daniel Libeskind (No 16), etc.; and Victor Arwas's Art Deco, first published in 1980 remains the standard work on the subject.

In 1997, Andreas and his daughter Alexandra founded Papadakis Publisher. In addition to books on architecture and the decorative arts, the company broadened its list to include natural science books with an emphasis on visual appeal and design. One of the new company's first publications in this field was the acclaimed series Pollen, Seeds and Fruit, a collaboration between seed morphologist Dr. Wolfgang Stuppy and visual artist Prof. Rob Kesseler in association with the Royal Botanic Gardens, Kew. The series was lauded for marrying science and visual art in a unique way, featuring vividly coloured electron micrograph images of microscopic plant structures and informative scientific text. The first two books of the series were awarded a joint gold medal by the American Independent Publisher's Association as Outstanding Books of the Year in 2007, and subsequent editions won the same award in 2011. The series also led to Andreas Papadakis being elected a Fellow of the Linnean Society a year before his death in June 2008.

== Recent titles ==
Under Alexandra's directorship, the company have maintained a reputation as producers of groundbreaking art, architecture, photography and natural science books, and have undertaken a number of high-profile collaborations. Notable recent titles include Hunting the Higgs: The inside story of the Atlas experiment at the Large Hadron Collider, published in association with CERN, Green Universe: A Microscopic Voyage Into the Plant Cell with the Royal Botanic Garden Edinburgh and Nanoscience: Giants of the Infinitesimal which was awarded a gold medal in the Science category at the Independent Publisher Book Awards in 2015.

== Selected awards ==
2006 Gold Medal, Outstanding Book of the Year, Independent Publisher Book Awards (IPPY) for Pollen: The Hidden Sexuality of Flowers and Seeds: Time Capsules of Life
2008 Longlisted, Royal Society Prize for Science Books for Why the Lion Grew Its Mane: A Miscellany of Recent Scientific Discoveries from Astronomy to Zoology
2008 Bronze Medal, Environment, Ecology & Nature, Independent Publisher Book Awards (IPPY) for Nomads of the Wind: The Journey of the Monarch Butterfly and Other Wonders of the Butterfly World
2008 Bronze Medal, Science, Independent Publisher Book Awards (IPPY) for Why the Lion Grew Its Mane: A Miscellany of Recent Scientific Discoveries From Astronomy to Zoology
2009 Special Prize of the Jury, Gourmand Awards for Fruit: Edible, Inedible, Incredible
2009 Silver Medal, Environment, Ecology & Nature, Independent Publisher Book Awards (IPPY) for Where Have all the Flowers Gone?
2009 Bronze Medal, Sinar Mas Print Awards for Pollen: The Hidden Sexuality of Flowers
2010 Silver Medal, Animals, Independent Publisher Book Awards (IPPY) for Why the Cheetah Cheats: And Other Mysteries of the Natural World
2011 Bronze Medal, Environment, Ecology & Nature, Independent Publisher Book Awards (IPPY) for Butterflies: Messages from Psyche
2011 Gold Medal, Photography, Independent Publisher Book Awards (IPPY) for Wild Africa
2011 Gold Medal, Sinar Mas Print Awards for The Bizarre and Incredible World of Plants
2012 Bronze Medal, Environment, Ecology & Nature, Independent Publisher Book Awards (IPPY) for Giant Silk Moths: Colour, Mimicry & Camouflage
2012 Gold Medal, Specialty, Independent Publisher Book Awards (IPPY) for The Hat Book
2013 Best UK Dessert Cookbook, Gourmand Awards for TeaTime: A Taste of London’s Best Afternoon Teas
2013 Gold Medal, Coffee Table Book, Independent Publisher Book Awards (IPPY) for TeaTime: A Taste of London’s Best Afternoon Teas
2013 Gold Medal, Science, Independent Publisher Book Awards (IPPY) for Green Universe: A Microscopic Voyage Into the Plant Cell
2014 Silver Medal, Home & Garden, Independent Publisher Book Awards (IPPY) for 100 Plants that Almost Changed the World
2014 Bronze Medal, Science, Independent Publisher Book Awards (IPPY) for Hunting the Higgs: The Inside Story of the ATLAS Experiment at the Large Hadron Collider
2015 Best Photography, Gourmand Awards for Wonders of the Plant Kingdom
2015 Bronze Medal, Environment, Ecology & Nature, Independent Publisher Book Awards (IPPY) for Seeing Butterflies: New Perspectives on Colour, Patterns & Mimicry
2015 Gold Medal, Science, Independent Publisher Book Awards (IPPY) for Nanoscience: Giants of the Infinitesimal

== See also ==
- Andreas Papadakis
