= San Sebastián, Tierra del Fuego =

Argentine village

San Sebastián
- Village
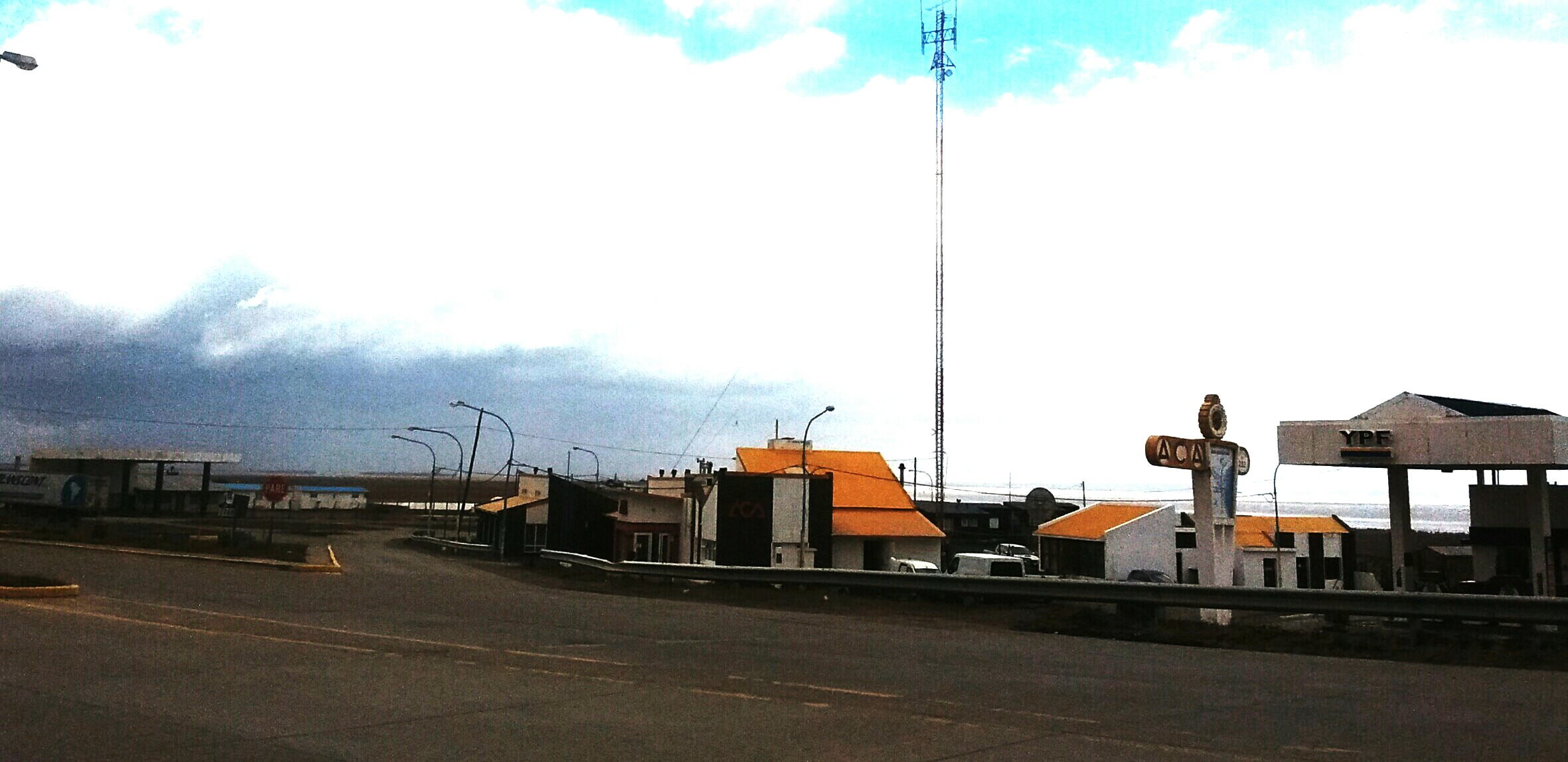

- Location within Southern Patagonia
- Coordinates: 53°17′59″S 68°27′27″W
- Country: Argentina
- Province: Tierra del Fuego
- Department: Río Grande
- Established: 29 July 1983
- Elevation: 14 m (46 ft)

Population (2010 Census)
  - Total: 940
- Time zone: UTC−3 (ART)
- CPA Base: V 9420
- Area code: +54 2964
- Climate: Dfc

San Sebastián is a village in Argentina, located on the southwestern shore of San Sebastián Bay, on National Route 3 in the Río Grande Department of Tierra del Fuego Province. As of 2012, it has a population of 940.
