= Ushuaia Department =

- Department
- Location of Ushuaia Department within Tierra del Fuego Province
- Coordinates: 54°48′58″S 68°19′25″W
- Country: Argentina
- Province: Tierra del Fuego Province
- Head town: Ushuaia

Area
  - Total: 9,390 km^{2} (3,630 sq mi)

Population (2010)
  - Total: 56,956
  - Density: 6.07/km^{2} (15.7/sq mi)
- Time zone: UTC-3 (ART)

Ushuaia Department (Spanish: Departamento Ushuaia) is a department of Argentina in Tierra del Fuego Province, Argentina.

== Geography ==
The capital city of the department is situated in Ushuaia. Off the eastern end of the main island, separated by the Le Maire Strait, is Isla de los Estados (English: Staten Island, from the Dutch Stateneiland). The department neighbours the Río Grande Department in Tierra del Fuego as well as the Argentine claimed department for the British Falkland Islands and Argentine Antarctica claim. In the department's port office, they stamp passports with the phrase "Fin del Mundo" (English: End of the World).

== Military ==
Ushuaia Department has long been a main location for Argentine military bases. During the 1982 Falklands War with the United Kingdom, the ARA General Belgrano sailed from Ushuaia to the Falkland Islands, where it was sunk by the Royal Navy submarine HMS Conqueror. As a result, there was sensitivity around the Falklands War and antipathy towards the British in the department as a result. In 2014, the controversy was restoked when the British television programme Top Gear drove through Ushuaia Department and were forced to flee due to a mob of Argentine veterans of the Falklands War attacking them. The mob felt that one of their car's numberplates (H982 FKL) was a reference to the Falklands War. In 2025, it was announced that the Argentine government had given consideration to a proposal from the United States to base United States Navy submarines in Ushuaia with a new naval base there.
