= Romanian Argentines =

Românii din Argentina (Romanian) Rumano-argentinos (Spanish)

Total population
- c. 17,000

Languages
- Rioplatense Spanish · Romanian

Religion
- Christianity · Judaism

Related ethnic groups
- Argentines of European descent

Romanian Argentines are Argentine citizens of Romanian descent or a group of Romania-born people who nowadays reside in Argentina.

Romanian immigration to Argentina began in the late nineteenth century and early twentieth century. It started along with the massive wave of European immigrants who arrived in the country during that period. Many Romanian immigrants to Argentina were Jewish. Numerically, this current was significantly lower than that of other peoples of Central and Eastern Europe.

== History ==
Romanian immigration to Argentina can be divided into three waves:

=== First wave ===
The first wave ranges from the late nineteenth century until after World War II. Immigrants came mainly from Austria-Hungary (Transylvania and Bukovina) and the Russian Empire (Bessarabia).

The earliest of whom is adventurer Julius Popper, who perpetrated the Selk'nam genocide.

=== Second wave ===
The second wave of Romanian immigrants in Argentina came just after the end of the World War II.

=== Third wave ===
The third wave came in the 90's, after the end of the communist regime in Romania.

=== Romanian Jews ===
As part of the first wave of Romanian immigrants who arrived to Argentina, Jewish settlers founded numerous towns in Santa Fe and Entre Ríos, including those of Moisés Ville, Palacios, Las Palmeras and Monigotes. Many families of Romanian-Jewish background joined these groups of pioneers.

== See also ==
- Argentina–Romania relations
- Argentines of European descent
- Romanian diaspora
