= El Sureño =

Argentinian newspaper

- Type: Daily newspaper
- Founded: 14 June 1991
- Language: Spanish
- Website: https://www.surenio.com.ar/

El Sureño is an Argentine daily newspaper printed in the Tierra Del Fuego Province. It was founded in 1991 and is owned by Fagon SRL.

Its headquarters are located in 9 de Julio 431, Río Grande. The current director is Oscar A. González.

It is the sales leader media in the province. It was declared of municipal interest in 2017 by the City council of Rio Grande.

== Reach ==
The newspaper is distributed in the Argentine province of Tierra del Fuego, primarily in the cities of Rio Grande and Ushuaia.

== Content ==
El Sureño publishes content organized into the following sections:

- Society
- Politics
- Crime
- Sports

In the years 1992, 1995, 1997, 1999, 2001, 2012, 2014 and 2015, it published features on the anniversary of the Tierra del Fuego Province creation.

== Censorship ==
In 2012, Fernando Medina, a reporter for El Sureño, resigned after denouncing internal censorship by the newspaper. He had made a report on expense irregularities in the Rio Grande city founds, in which informed a three times overprice in a sports event organized by the city government.

In 2012, Diego Salazar, a journalist, was intimidated by members of the Truckers Union after taking photos of riots that followed a rally of then-president Cristina Fernández de Kirchner.
