= Les Eclaireurs Lighthouse =

Lighthouse off the coast of Ushuaia, southern Argentina

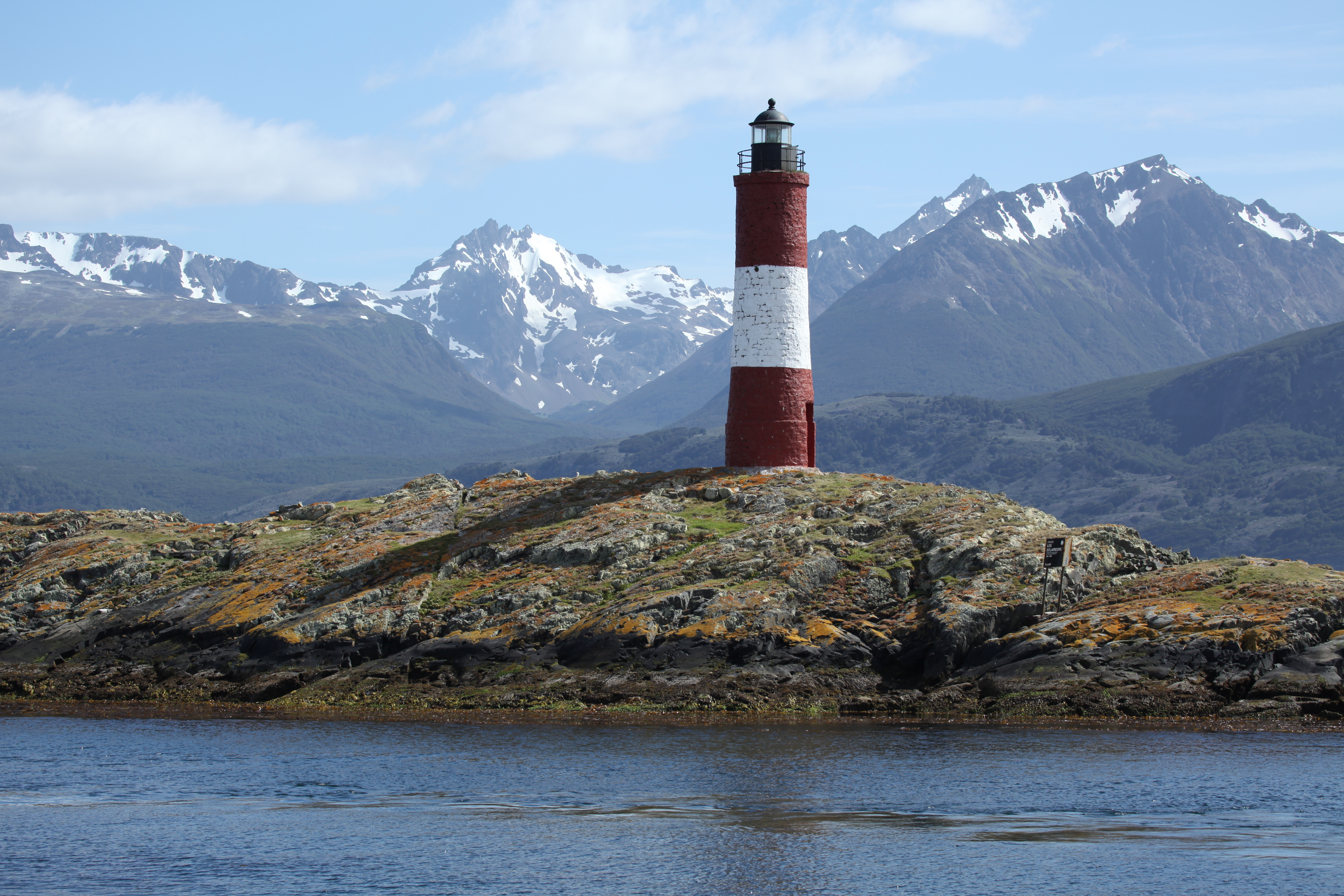
- Les Eclaireurs Lighthouse, located in Tierra del Fuego, Argentina
- Location: 5 nmi (9.3 km) E of Ushuaia, Argentina
- Coordinates: 54°52′17.5″S 68°05′0″W

Tower
- Constructed: 1920
- Foundation: Masonry base
- Construction: Brick tower
- Height: 11 metres (36 ft)
- Shape: Cylindrical tower with balcony and lantern
- Markings: Red tower with a broad white band, black lantern
- Power source: solar power

Light
- Focal height: 22.5 metres (74 ft)
- Range: White: 10 nautical miles (19 km; 12 mi); Red: 7 nautical miles (13 km; 8.1 mi)
- Characteristic: Fl WR 5s.

Les Eclaireurs Lighthouse (French: Les Éclaireurs, lit. 'the Scouts') is a slightly conical lighthouse standing on the northeasternmost island of the five or more Les Eclaireurs islands, which it takes its name from, 5 nautical miles (9 km) east of Ushuaia in the Beagle Channel, Tierra del Fuego, southern Argentina.

== History ==
The brick-built tower is 11 metres (36 ft) high and 3 metres (10 ft) wide at the base, with its windowless wall painted red-white-red and topped by a black lantern housing and gallery. Only a door pointing to the west provides access to the building. The light is 22.5 metres (74 ft) above sea level emitting white flashes every ten seconds with a range of 7.5 nautical miles (13.9 km). The lighthouse is still in operation, is remote-controlled, automated, uninhabited, and is not open to the public, guarding the sea entrance to Ushuaia—solar panels supply electricity. The lighthouse was put into service on December 23, 1920.

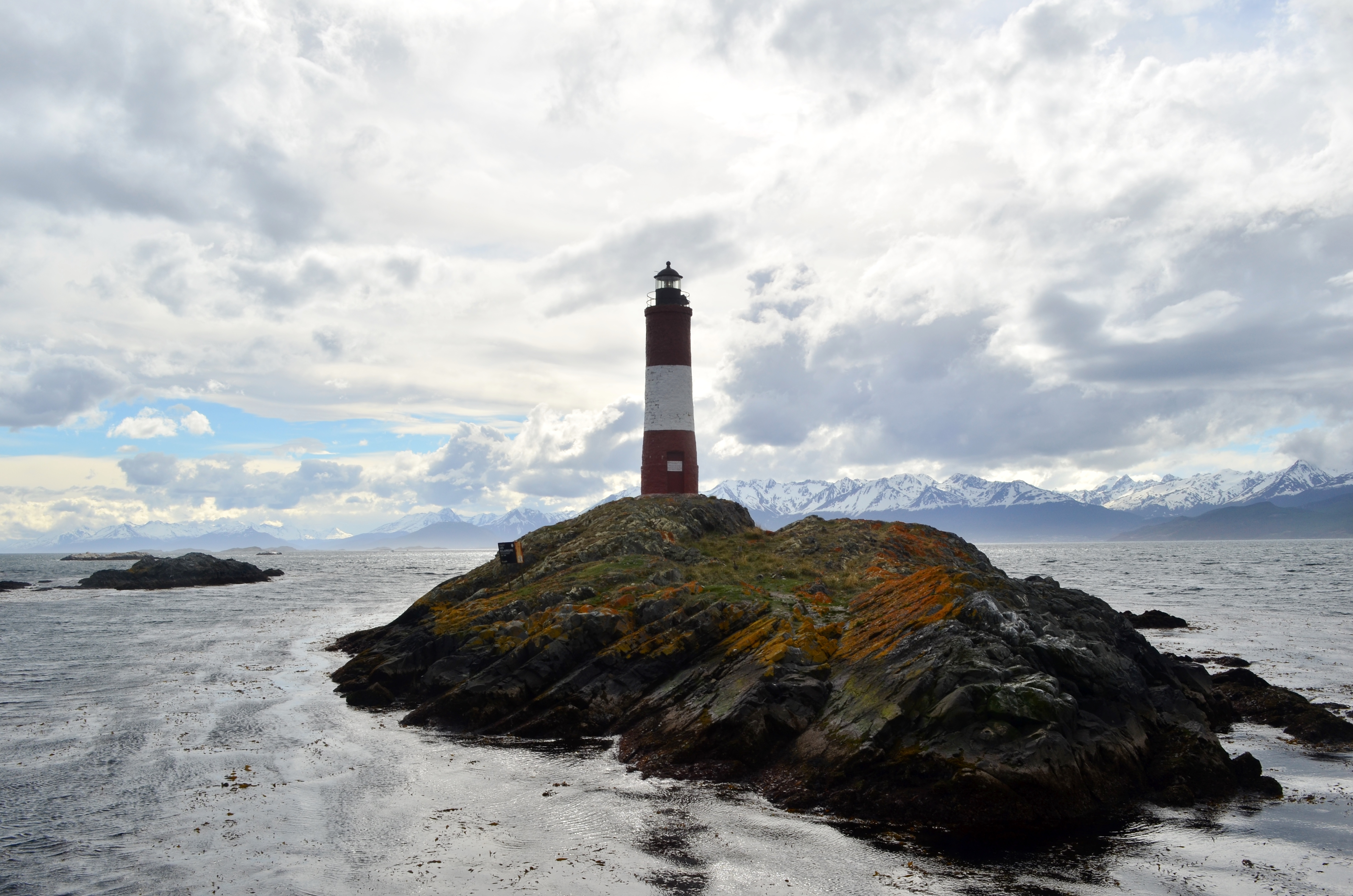
Les Éclaireurs Lighthouse

It is a popular tourist attraction, reached on short boat tours from Ushuaia. It is known to the Argentines as the Lighthouse at the End of the World (Faro del fin del mundo), although that name is misleading. The lighthouse is often confused with the San Juan de Salvamento lighthouse on the east coast of the remote Isla de los Estados, made famous by Jules Verne in the novel The Lighthouse at the End of the World, which is actually much further east.

== See also ==
- List of lighthouses in Argentina
- Cape Horn
