= Garayalde =

Coordinates: 44°40′S 66°40′W

- Municipality and village
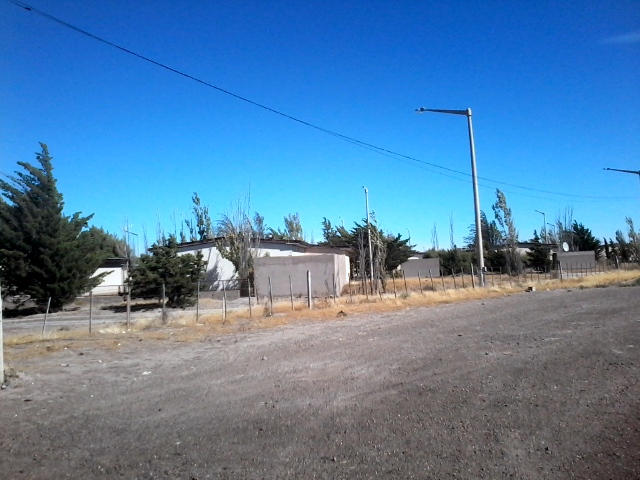
- Garayalde casa
- Interactive map of Garayalde
- Country: Argentina
- Province: Chubut Province
- Department: Florentino Ameghino Department
- Time zone: UTC−3 (ART)

Garayalde is a village and municipality in Chubut Province in southern Argentina.
