= Camarones, Chubut =

Camarones
- Town
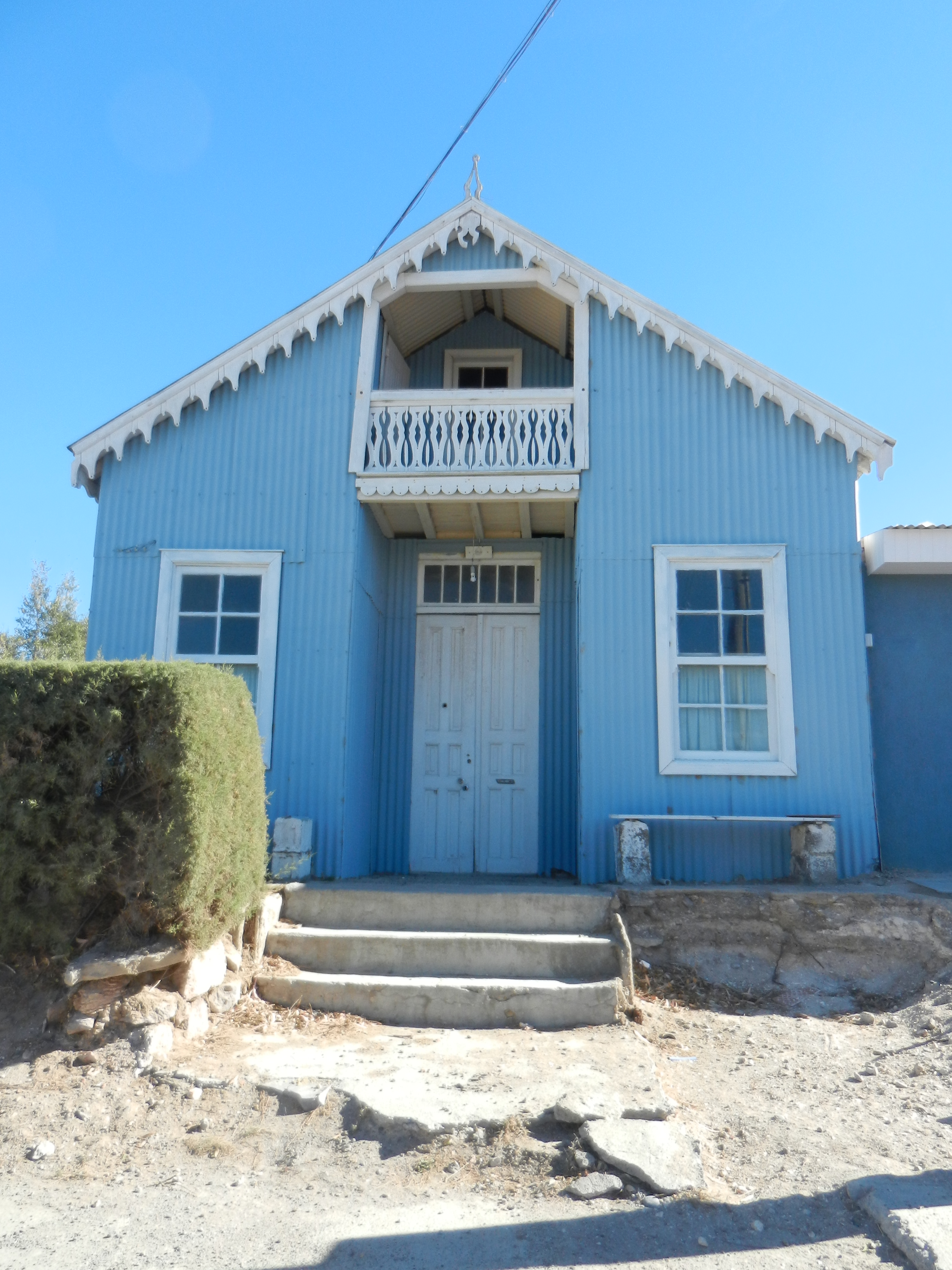
- Casa Vogel

- Location of in Argentina
- Coordinates: 44°48′S 65°42′W
- Country: Argentina
- Province: Chubut
- Department: Florentino Ameghino

Population
  - Total: 1,079
- Demonym: camoronese
- Time zone: UTC−3 (ART)
- CPA base: U9111
- Dialing code: +54 297
- Climate: BWk

Camarones is a small town located in Chubut Province, Argentina. It is the head town of the Florentino Ameghino Department.

== Geography ==
=== Climate ===
Camarones has a cold semi-arid climate (Köppen BSk). Winters are cool with a July mean of 6.8 °C (44.2 °F). Frosts are common during the winter months, averaging 4–7 days from June to August. Overcast days are common, averaging 8–10 days and sunshine is low, averaging only 28-40% of possible sunshine.

Summers are warm with a January mean of 18.1 °C (64.6 °F) and tend to be sunnier. Precipitation is low, averaging 237.3 millimetres (9 in) a year, which is fairly evenly distributed throughout the year. Camarones receives 1960 hours of sunshine a year or about 42.9% of possible sunshine, ranging from a low of 75.0 hours in May to a high of 242 hours in January.

Climate data for Camarones, Chubut
Month	Jan	Feb	Mar	Apr	May	Jun	Jul	Aug	Sep	Oct	Nov	Dec	Year
Record high °C (°F)	39.0 (102.2)	38.3 (100.9)	38.0 (100.4)	31.0 (87.8)	27.0 (80.6)	24.5 (76.1)	21.0 (69.8)	24.8 (76.6)	27.5 (81.5)	32.4 (90.3)	36.3 (97.3)	39.8 (103.6)	39.8 (103.6)
Mean daily maximum °C (°F)	24.5 (76.1)	24.4 (75.9)	22.0 (71.6)	18.1 (64.6)	14.3 (57.7)	11.3 (52.3)	10.8 (51.4)	12.8 (55.0)	15.3 (59.5)	18.6 (65.5)	21.3 (70.3)	23.0 (73.4)	18.0 (64.4)
Daily mean °C (°F)	18.1 (64.6)	18.0 (64.4)	16.1 (61.0)	12.8 (55.0)	9.9 (49.8)	7.3 (45.1)	6.8 (44.2)	8.1 (46.6)	9.9 (49.8)	12.4 (54.3)	15.1 (59.2)	16.9 (62.4)	12.6 (54.7)
Mean daily minimum °C (°F)	12.9 (55.2)	12.7 (54.9)	10.7 (51.3)	7.7 (45.9)	5.1 (41.2)	2.8 (37.0)	2.4 (36.3)	3.3 (37.9)	4.8 (40.6)	7.0 (44.6)	9.7 (49.5)	11.9 (53.4)	7.6 (45.7)
Record low °C (°F)	4.5 (40.1)	2.8 (37.0)	2.2 (36.0)	−2.0 (28.4)	−7.5 (18.5)	−7.0 (19.4)	−7.5 (18.5)	−4.5 (23.9)	−3.1 (26.4)	−2.0 (28.4)	−1.0 (30.2)	1.5 (34.7)	−7.5 (18.5)
Average precipitation mm (inches)	12.5 (0.49)	16.9 (0.67)	23.7 (0.93)	22.9 (0.90)	31.0 (1.22)	26.7 (1.05)	22.3 (0.88)	15.4 (0.61)	13.4 (0.53)	23.6 (0.93)	12.7 (0.50)	16.2 (0.64)	237.3 (9.34)
Average relative humidity (%)	52.3	53.3	54.7	57.3	63.0	66.7	65.7	57.3	55.3	51.3	49.7	52.7	56.6
Mean monthly sunshine hours	241.8	226.0	164.3	156.0	96.1	75.0	86.1	130.2	129.0	207.7	237.0	210.8	1,960
Percentage possible sunshine	50	57	42	47	32	28	34	40	37	50	54	44	43
Source: Secretaria de Mineria
