= El Rincón Lighthouse =

Lighthouse in Argentina

El Rincón
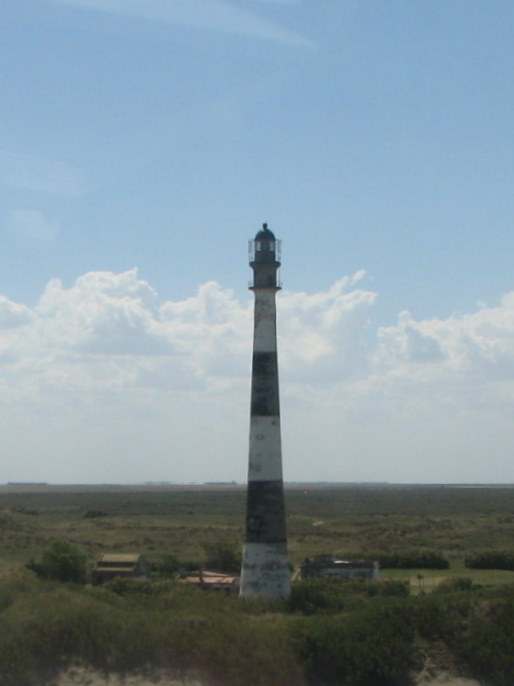
- El Rincón Light, 2009
- Location: Buenos Aires Province; Argentina
- Coordinates: 39°23′5.04″S 62°0′53.42″W

Tower
- Constructed: 1925
- Construction: concrete tower
- Height: 203 feet (62 m)
- Shape: tapered cylindrical tower with double gallery and lantern
- Markings: black and white tower with horizontal bands

Light
- Focal height: 210 feet (64 m)
- Range: 29 nautical miles (54 km; 33 mi)
- Characteristic: Fl (2+1) W 40s.

El Rincón Light is an active lighthouse in the Buenos Aires Province, Argentina. At a height of 203 feet (62 m) it is the nineteenth tallest "traditional lighthouse" in the world, and one of the tallest concrete lighthouses in the world. Located about 30 miles (48 km) northeast of Pedro Luro on the Península Verde, it guards a principal entrance to the seaport of Bahía Blanca. Two stamps featuring the lighthouse were created, one in 2006 and the other one in 2010.

== See also ==
- List of tallest lighthouses in the world
- List of lighthouses in Argentina
