= Andreas Papadakis =

British academic and publisher (1938–2008)

Andreas Constantine Papadakis FLS (17 June 1938 – 10 June 2008) was a Cypriot-born British academic, entrepreneur and leading figure in the field of architectural publishing. He opened the Academy Bookshop in Holland Street, Kensington, in 1964 and moved into publishing as Academy Editions in 1968. From then until 1990, when he sold the company to VCH Germany (now part of John Wiley) he published more than a thousand titles mainly on art, architecture and the decorative arts. He was the first to publish (in the US - Rizzoli and latter St. Martin's Press) many international architects in the Architectural Monographs series, which included Alvar Aalto (No 4), Michael Graves (No 5), Edwin Lutyens (No 6), John Soane (No 8), Terry Farrell (No 9), Richard Rogers (No 10), Mies van der Rohe (No 11), Hassan Fathy (No 13), Tadao Ando (No 14), Daniel Libeskind (No 16), etc.; and Victor Arwas's Art Deco, first published in 1980, remains the standard work on the subject.

== Early life ==
Papadakis was born in Nicosia, Cyprus on 17 June 1938 and relocated to London in 1956. He obtained a DIC from Imperial College and a PhD from Brunel University. In 1964 he bought a house in Holland Street, Kensington without realising that the shop (then a dry cleaners) on the ground floor could not be used for residential purposes. He decided to open a bookshop. The Academy Bookshop began as a general bookshop. His first publications were finely bound limited editions of other publishers' books but he soon decided that he would prefer to make his own and began in 1967 with a large format paperback of Aubrey Beardsley's prints, an ideal title to attract the customers of Biba, who had recently opened her shop just round the corner in Kensington Church Street. The Beardsley book was still in print when Academy was sold in 1991.

== Academy Editions and Architectural Design ==
In 1971 Papadakis expanded his fast-growing business with the acquisition of the Tiranti publishing company and the London Art Bookshop. He moved the shop to No. 8 Holland Street, just opposite the Academy Bookshop and set about expanding the combined Academy/Tiranti list. Early publications included Jim Burns's Arthropods, Roger Bilcliffe's Charles Rennie Mackintosh, Rudofsky's Architecture Without Architects, Reyner Banham's Design by Choice, Alphonse Mucha, Complete Graphic Works, and Wittkower's Architectural Principles in the Age of Humanism.

In 1976 Papadakis bought the financially troubled Architectural Design magazine. This created some controversy because of his non-architectural background and his unwillingness to give his unconditional support to one particular architectural style. The controversy increased with the publication of Charles Jencks's The Language of Post-Modern Architecture in 1977, which was in its sixth edition by the time he sold Academy in 1990.

Both Architectural Design and Academy Editions continued to publish Post-Modern, Classical and Deconstructivist projects throughout the 1980s while Papadakis himself actively fostered the pluralist debate through seminars, conferences and exhibitions at the Polytechnic of Central London, the Architectural Association, the RIBA, the German Architecture Museum in Frankfurt, and through his Academy Forums at the Tate Gallery and the Royal Academy of Arts, where he also founded the annual Architecture Lecture.

In 1990, Papadakis sold what was by now the Academy Group Ltd. with Architectural Design and the journals he had founded: Architectural Monographs, Art and Design and the Journal of Philosophy and the Visual Arts. He left the group at the end of 1992 and was banned by a non-competition clause from publishing for five years.

== Papadakis Publisher and restoration projects ==
In 1997, Papadakis founded a new publishing house, Papadakis Publisher, with his daughter Alexandra. In addition to books on architecture and the decorative arts the company broadened its scope to include books on natural science, including the acclaimed series Pollen, Seeds and Fruit in association with the Royal Botanic Gardens, Kew, leading to his election as a fellow of the Linnean Society. Pollen and Seeds were awarded a joint gold medal by the American Independent Publishers' Association in 2006 as Outstanding Books of the Year, and his first science book Why the Lion Grew its Mane was long-listed by the Royal Society in 2007.

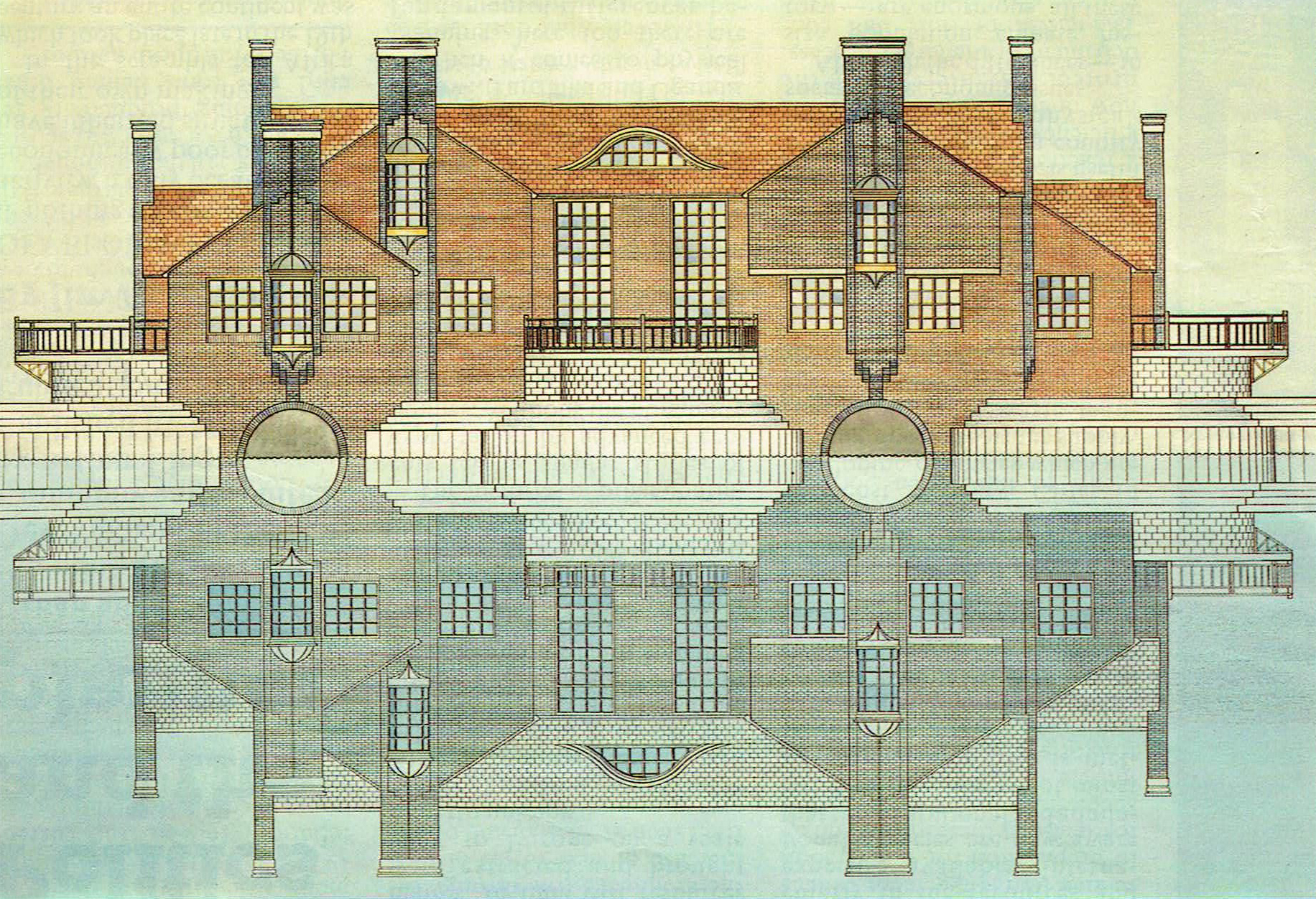
Church Island House in the Thames

As Papadakis's business ventures were increasingly successful, he purchased several properties for restoration, including the medieval Kilbees Farm in Winkfield, Berkshire, 107 Park Street and 9 Charles Street, both in Mayfair, London, 16 Grosvenor Place in Belgravia, and Dauntsey Park House in Wiltshire, although the latter project ended in 2005 when planning permission was refused. In 1987 Papadakis bought Church Island in the Thames and commissioned Dr. Basil Al Bayati, an architect whose books Architect and Recent Works he had published, to design a house for him. "For his luxury mansion on his Greek-island-in-the-Thames, the great man chose not Michael Graves, one of the deconstructivists or even CZWG, but pragmatic classicist Basil Al Bayati, whom he instructed to design a country house in the English turn-of-the-century manner." The plan of the house is based on multiple units of structural geometrical forms and utilises extensive brickwork in a postmodern, art & craft style. It was "designed in a vernacular manner, using building materials similar to those traditionally used in the area."

In 1988, Church Island House was exhibited at the German Architecture Museum in Frankfurt in an exhibition titled the Architecture of Pluralism that included work by James Gowan, Terry Farrell, Charles Jencks and some twenty other internationally recognised architects.

In 2007 he purchased Monkey Island Hotel in Bray, Berkshire, but died a few months afterward. Alexandra Papadakis continued to run the hotel until it was sold in 2015.
