= Monte Hermoso =

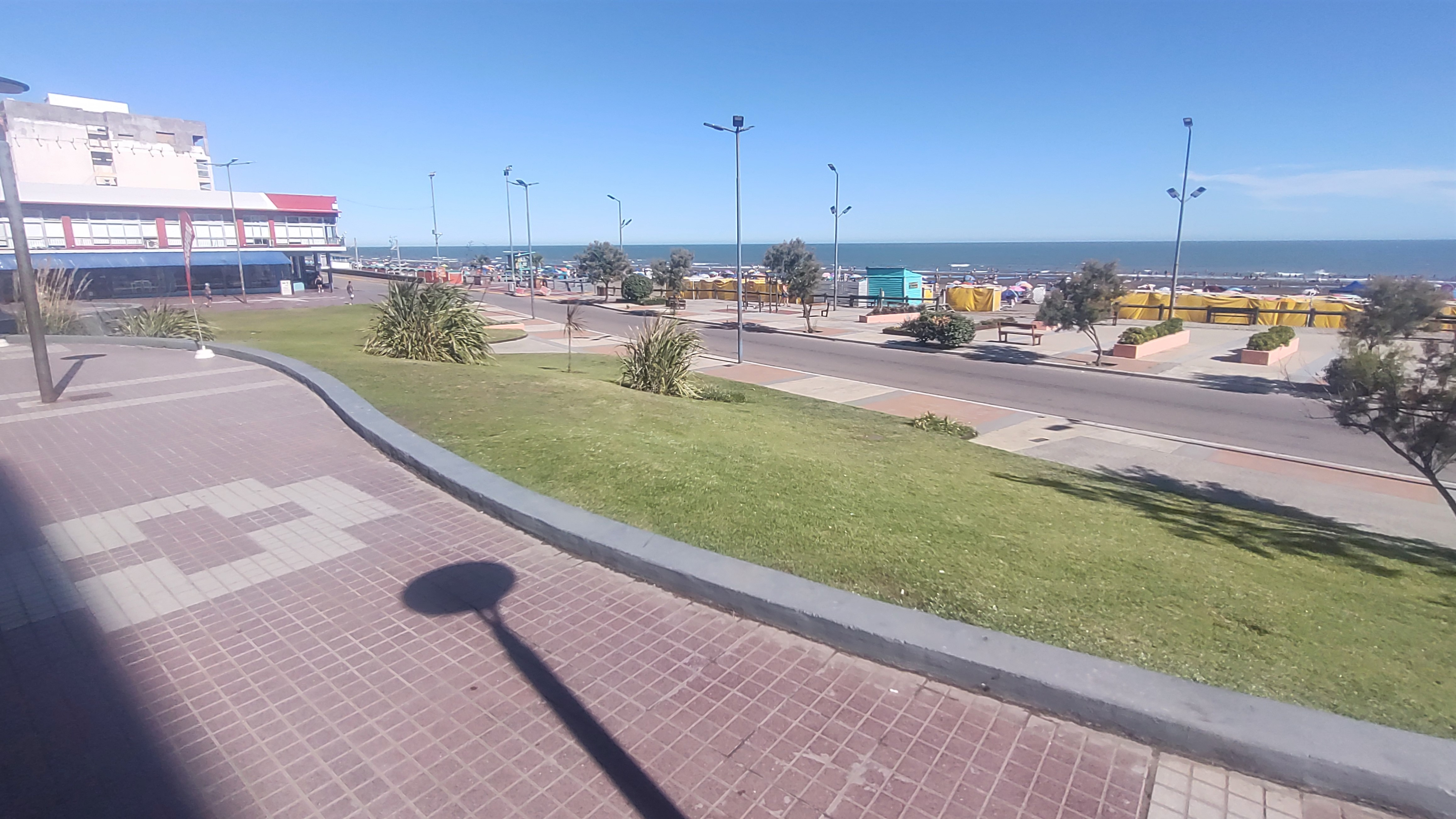

- Location in Buenos Aires Province Monte Hermoso (Argentina)
- Coordinates: 38°59′S 61°18′W
- Country: Argentina
- Province: Buenos Aires
- Partido: Monte Hermoso
- Elevation: 24 m (79 ft)

Population (2022 census [INDEC])
  - Total: 8,821
- CPA Base: B 8153
- Area code: +54 2921

Monte Hermoso is a town located on the Argentine Atlantic Coast, some 100 km (62 mi) east of the city of Bahía Blanca, in the south of the Province of Buenos Aires. It is the administrative seat of the partido of Monte Hermoso.

Founded at the beginning of the twentieth century, Monte Hermoso is a family seaside resort with more than 32 km (20 mi) of beach overlooking the Atlantic Ocean and with the unique characteristic in Argentina of having both sunrises and sunsets over the sea.

The summer climate of Monte Hermoso is more temperate than that of other major seaside resorts due to the sea breeze effect, while the water itself is warmer, making for a pleasant beach experience.

Monte Hermoso owes its existence to the 1879 purchase of 4,000 seaside hectares (10,000 acres) by Esteban Dufaur. His son, Sulpicio, created the El Recreo estancia in 1910, and in 1918, began welcoming guests with the inaugural of the Hotel de Madera; the hotel was built by Dafaur with lumber salvaged from a shipwreck on the shore. The settlement was established as such in 1975, and given autonomy on April 1, 1979.

The lighthouse, Faro Recalada a Bahia Blanca, 73 m (240 ft) high and the tallest in South America, is situated on the coastal road to Sauce Grande about 7 km (4 mi) east of the resort, where it marks the route to the nearby port of Bahía Blanca. Prefabricated in France by the same construction company, Barbier Bernad and Turenne that built the Eiffel Tower in Paris, it was erected in Argentina under the direction of Engineer Luigi, who also supervised the construction of the nearby naval base at Puerto Belgrano. Opened on 1 January 1906, the staffed lighthouse, painted in red and white and giving out a white flash every 9 seconds, comprises an octagonal pyramidal cast iron tower with a central cylinder lantern and gallery. Guided tours of the lighthouse are provided daily.

== Notable people ==
- Baltasar Rodríguez (born 2003), first Monte Hermoso native to play in Argentine Primera División (Racing Club)
