= Florentino Ameghino Department =

Florentino Ameghino
- Departamento Florentino Ameghino
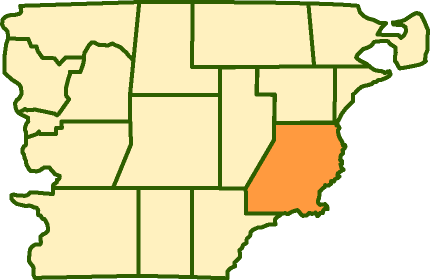
- location of Florentino Ameghino Department in Chubut Province
- Coordinates: 44°46′S 65°43′W
- Country: Argentina
- Province: Chubut
- Foundation: October 10, 1900
- Founder: Simón de Alcazaba and Soto Mayor
- Capital: Camarones

Area
  - Total: 16,088 km^{2} (6,212 sq mi)

Population (2001 census [INDEC])
  - Total: 1,484
  - Density: 0.09224/km^{2} (0.2389/sq mi)
  - Change 1991-2001: +30.3%
- Post Code: U9111
- Area code: 0297
- Resident: camaronense
- Distance to Buenos Aires: 1,654km
- Website: http://www.vistasdelvalle.com.ar

Florentino Ameghino is a department of Chubut Province. It is located on the Atlantic coast of Argentina

The provincial subdivision has a population of about 1,484 inhabitants in an area of 16,088 km^{2}, and its capital city is Camarones, which is located around 1,654 km from the Capital federal.

The department is noted for its wealth of geological and paleontological features. Specimens from the region are on display in a number of museums worldwide.

The department is named in honour of Florentino Ameghino (September 18, 1854 – August 6, 1911), an Argentine naturalist, paleontologist, anthropologist and zoologist

== Economy ==
The economy of Florentino Ameghino and its head town is dominated by tourism. People are attracted to the region by its lengthy unspoiled coastline, its geography and fauna, especially the penguin colonies.

== Attractions ==
- Fiesta Nacional de Salmon (National Salmon Festival)
- Cabo Dos Bahías

== Settlements ==
- Camarones
- Malaspina
- La Esther
- Garayalde
- Caleta Hornos
- Uzcudun
- Florentino Ameghino
- Cabo Raso
- Puesto El Palenque
