= Holland Street, Kensington =

Street in Kensington, London

Coordinates: 51.503186°N 0.192866°W

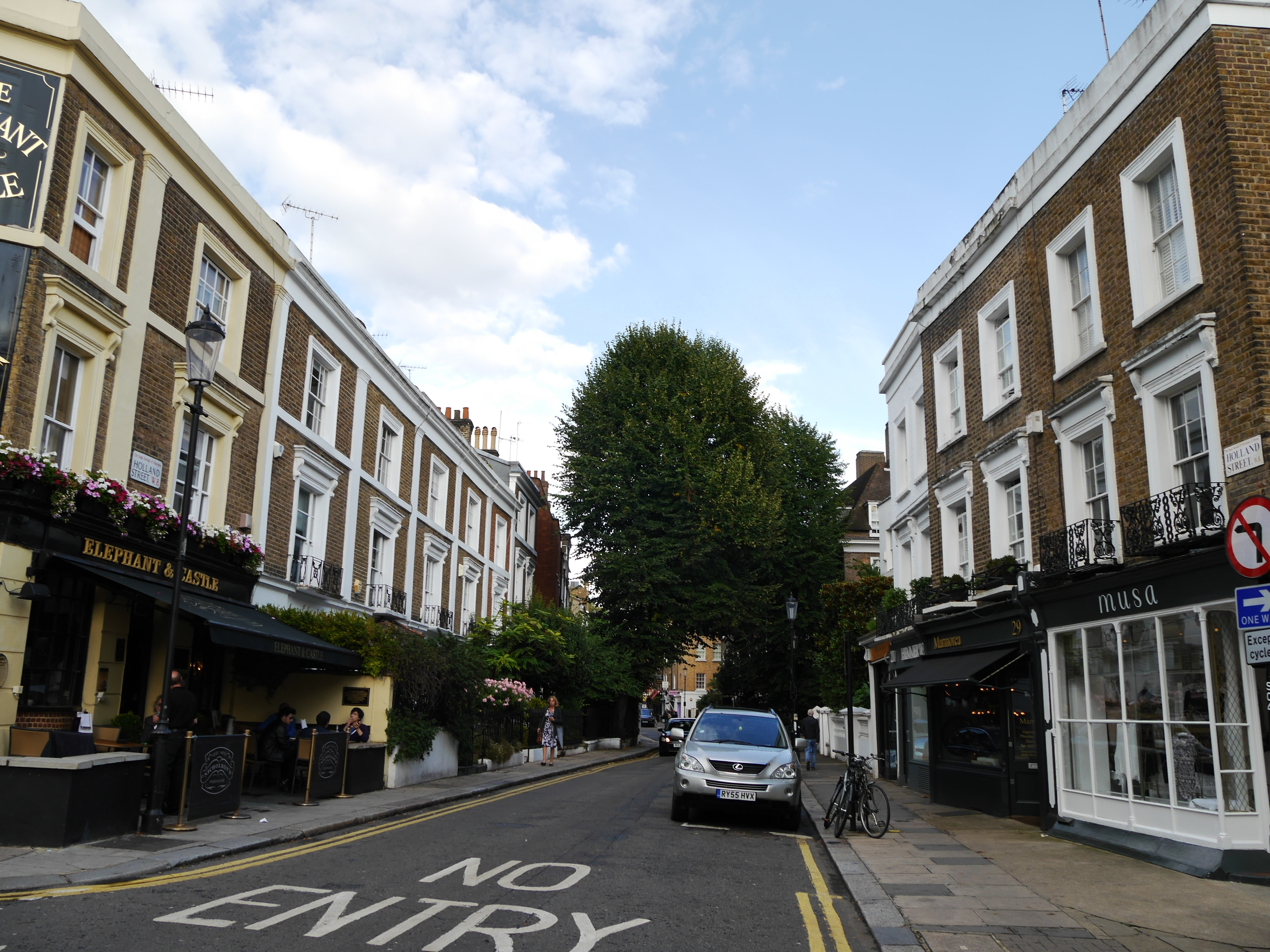
Holland Street, 2016

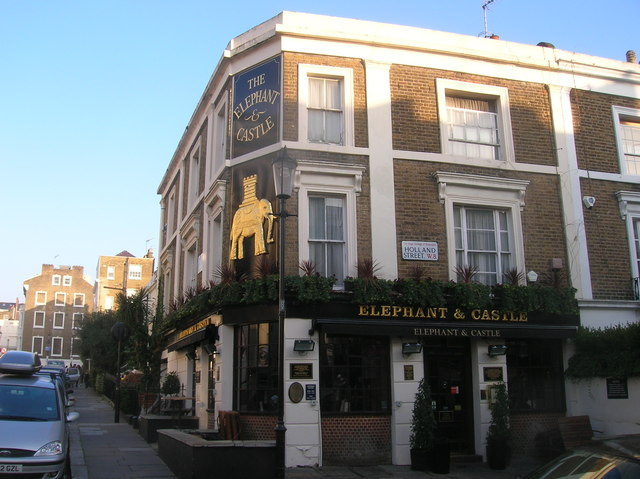
The Elephant and Castle public house on Holland Street

Holland Street is a street in Kensington, London W8.

== Location ==
Holland Street runs west to east from Campden Hill Road to Kensington Church Street.

== History ==
The land was bought by John Jones in 1722, and the first houses to be built were 3–7 on the south side in 1724, with the help of his nephew and son-in-law John Price. Jones died in 1727, and left his property in Kensington to his wife Rebecca and his son-in-law, who built most of the rest of the houses by 1736. It was originally called Parson's Yard, and was renamed as Holland Street in the early 1800s.

== Notable residents ==
Catherine Matcham youngest sister of Admiral Lord Viscount Nelson was a resident of Holland Street at the time of her death in March 1842.

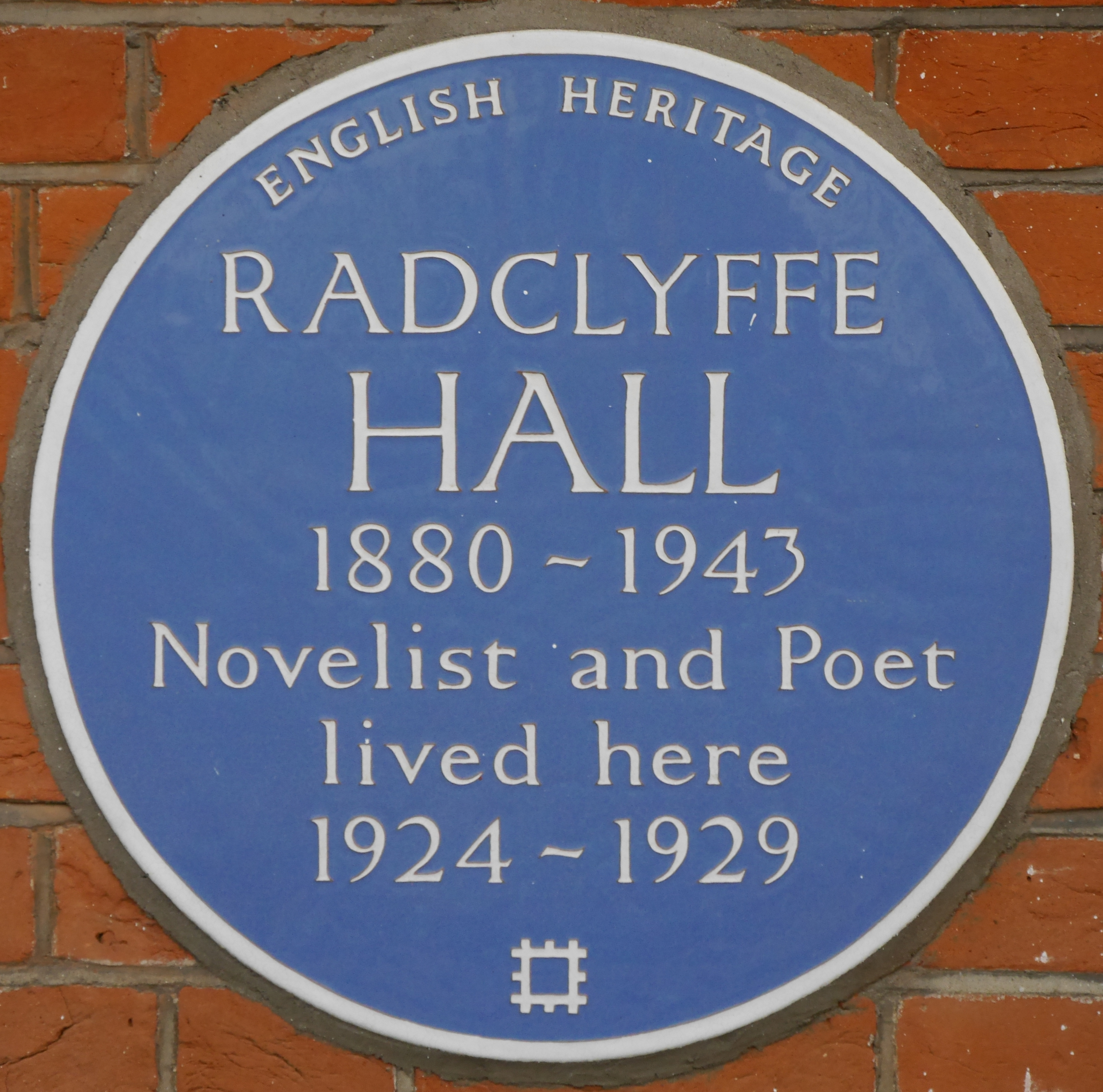
Radclyffe Hall blue plaque, 37 Holland Street

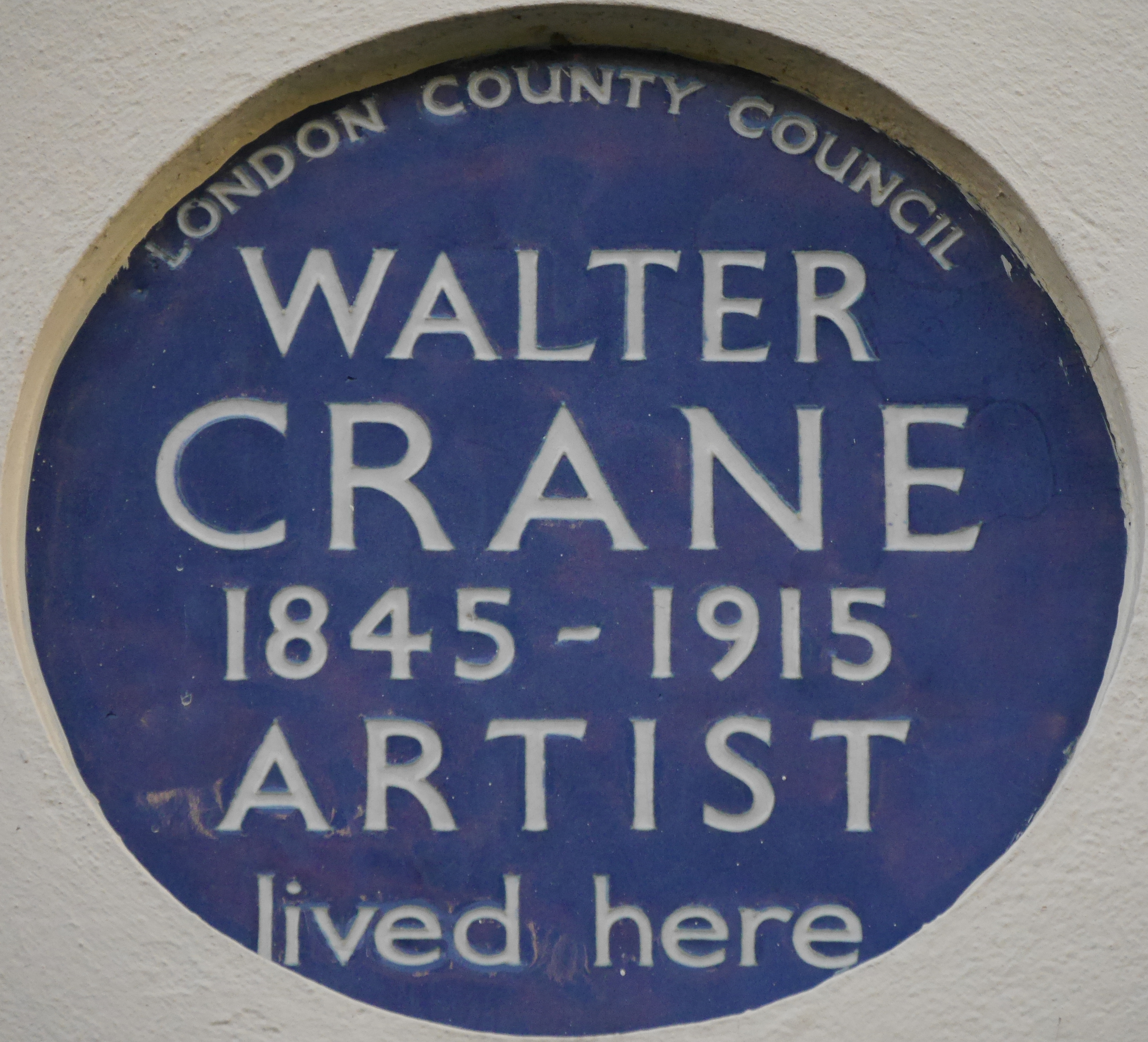
Walter Crane blue plaque, 13 Holland Street

The novelist and poet Radclyffe Hall (1880–1943), lived at no 37 from 1924 to 1929. The artist Walter Crane (1845–1915), lived at no 13 from 1892 until his death in 1915. There are blue plaques for both. Randolph Caldecott (1846–1886), the artist and illustrator, lived at no 24.

Pomona Toys were located at 14 Holland Street from about 1927 to c1939. Owned by Mary Vermuyden Wheelhouse and A.B Ellis.

In 1964, the Cypriot-born British academic and entrepreneur Andreas Papadakis opened the Academy Bookshop in Holland Street, and moved into publishing as Academy Editions in 1968.

In the early 1970s, the musician Jimmy Page owned an occult bookshop and publishing house, The Equinox Booksellers and Publishers, on Holland Street, eventually closing it as the increasing success of the pop group Led Zeppelin occupied his time.
