= Monte Hermoso Partido =

Monte Hermoso Partido de Monte Hermoso
- Department
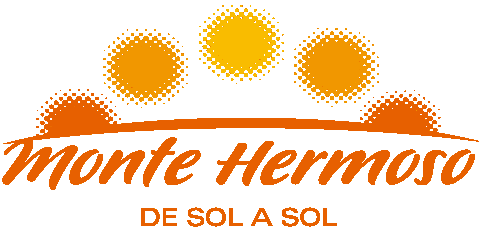

- location of in Buenos Aires Province
- Coordinates: 38°59′S 61°15′W
- Country: Argentina
- Established: 1978
- Seat: Monte Hermoso

Government
  - Intendant: Hernán Fabio Arranz (P.J.)

Area
  - Total: 230 km^{2} (89 sq mi)

Population
  - Total: 5,602
  - Density: 24/km^{2} (63/sq mi)
- Postal Code: B8153
- IFAM: BUE084
- Area Code: 02921
- Website: www.montehermoso.gov.ar

Monte Hermoso Partido is a partido on the Atlantic coast of Buenos Aires Province in Argentina.

The provincial subdivision has a population of about 5,000 inhabitants in an area of 230 km^{2} (89 sq mi). Its capital city is Monte Hermoso, 694 km (431 mi) from Buenos Aires.

== Geography ==
Monte Hermoso is a resort (beach) town on the Southern Atlantic coast. The beaches extend for a length of 32 km (20 mi) with a slight decline behind a string of dunes.

== Climate ==
Monte Hermoso is situated in the eastern limit of a convergence zone between northern tropical air and southern (polar) cold fronts. It is generally breezy with a strong oceanic influence. The average maximum temperature is 26 °C (79 °F) and the low is 5 °C (41 °F) inland in winter.

== Distances ==
- Bahía Blanca, 106 km (66 mi)
- San Carlos de Bariloche, 1,071 km (665 mi)
- Buenos Aires, 630 km (391 mi)
- Córdoba, 1,038 km (645 mi)
- Mendoza, 1,276 km (793 mi)
- Rosario, 810 km (503 mi)

== Settlements ==
- Monte Hermoso (pop. 5,394)
- Balneario Sauce Grande (pop. 177)
