= San Sebastián Bay =

Bay in Tierra del Fuego, Argentina

Coordinates: 53°12′S 68°20′W

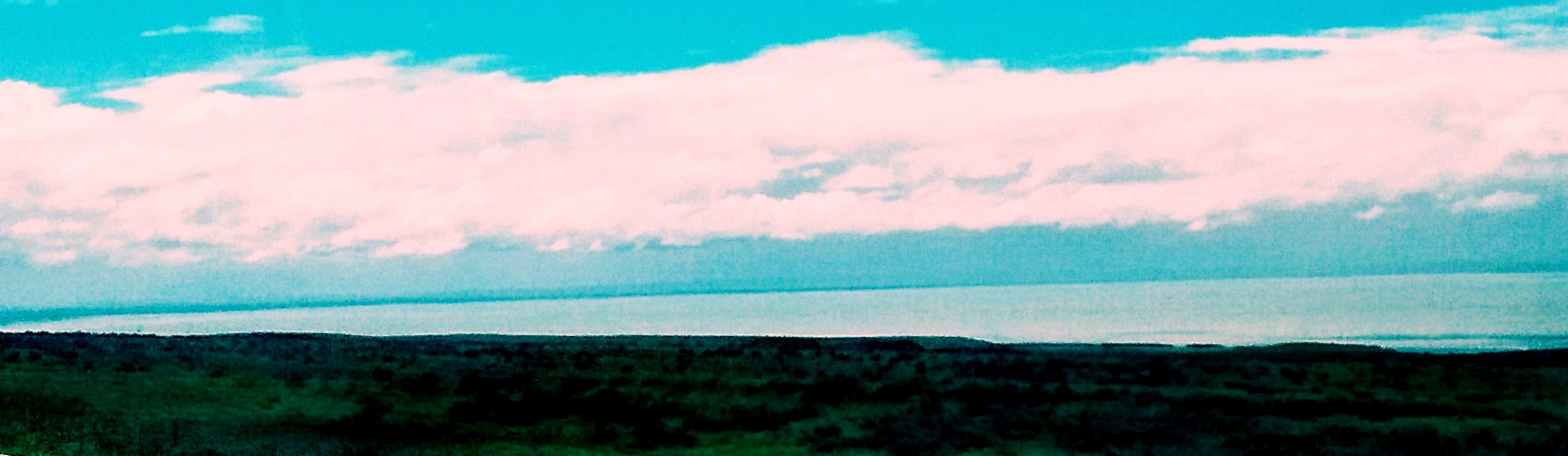
Bahía San Sebastián.

San Sebastián Bay is located in the northern coast of Argentina's Tierra del Fuego Province. The bay is partly enclosed by the 17 km-long El Páramo spit that protrudes from the north. The spit is made of sand and gravel. There has been a trend of falling relative sea level over the last 7,000 years. Tides in the bay are large.
