= Río Grande Department =

- Department
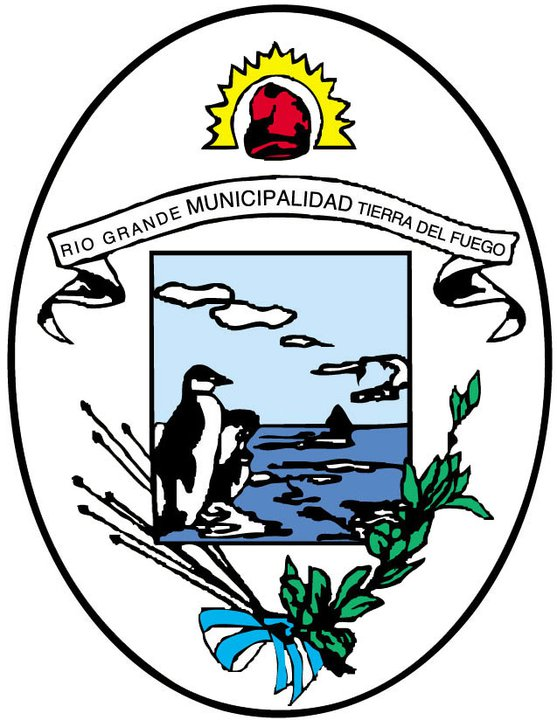
- Flag Coat of arms

- Location of Río Grande Department within Tierra del Fuego Province
- Coordinates: 53°47′11″S 67°41′48″W
- Country: Argentina
- Province: Tierra del Fuego Province
- Head town: Río Grande

Area
  - Total: 12,181 km^{2} (4,703 sq mi)

Population (2010)
  - Total: 70,042
  - Density: 5.7501/km^{2} (14.893/sq mi)
- Time zone: UTC-3 (ART)

Río Grande Department (Spanish: Departamento Río Grande) is a department of Argentina in Tierra del Fuego Province, Argentina. The largest city and seat of the department is the city of Río Grande. It was established in the early 20th century as an agricultural colony, followed by the development of its port and, the further discovery of oil, have shaped its economic and demographic landscape.

== History ==
The history of the area dates to an expedition led by Julio Popper discovering the Río Grande in October 1886. The establishment of the first Salesian Mission in 1893 is considered the earliest record of white settlement in the region. Río Grande was officially founded on 11 July 1921, and was recognized by a central government decree as an agricultural colony. The initial settlers were workers from the abandoned gold mines in the San Sebastian region. The city experienced rapid growth as a port and an urban center. The discovery of oil in 1959, spurred significant migratory movements, further complemented by migrations in the 1970s and 1980s due to the promulgation of the Law of Economic Promotion, offering tax exemptions and subsidies to industries and settlers.

== Geography ==
The Río Grande Department is located in the Province of Tierra del Fuego, Antarctica, and South Atlantic Islands, in the southern part of Argentina. The department's seat and most populous city, Río Grande, is situated on the northeast coast of the Great Island of Tierra del Fuego archipelago, bordering the Argentine Sea, an extension of the South Atlantic Ocean. A notable geographical feature is the cape of Cabo San Sebastián in the northeast sector of the Great Island. This area features coasts with high cliffs interspersed with lower sandy and silty sections, known for its significant tidal ranges.

== Demographics ==
As per the 2022 census, the department had a population of 99,241 inhabitants, with approximately 50.1% women and 49.9% men. The city of Río Grande, which is the largest urban center in the department, had a population of 64,535 inhabitants, with approximately 51.5% women and 48.5% men. About 27.1% of the total population were less than nineteen years of age. Migrants entering Río Grande in the last five years primarily came from the United States (923 people), with minimal numbers from Argentina (7 people), and Canada (4 people).
