= Southernmost settlements =

World's most southerly settlements

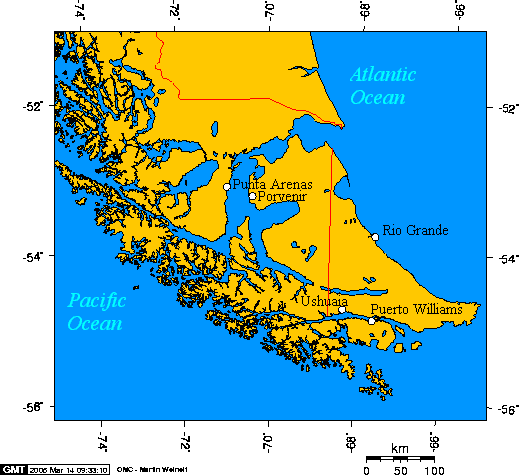
Location of Punta Arenas, Porvenir, Río Grande, Ushuaia and Puerto Williams in the southern tip of South America.

This article covers towns, weather stations and permanent military bases that are farther south than latitude 45°S. Unlike the northern hemisphere, where several major metropolitan areas such as Moscow, Harbin, London, Paris, Seattle, and Montreal are all located north of the 45°N parallel, the only permanently populated areas south of the 45°S parallel are the small and sparsely populated regions of southern Patagonia in South America, the Falkland Islands, and the southernmost tip of New Zealand.

== Southernmost city ==
The southernmost city in the world is mainly a slogan used for tourism purposes to attract visitors to a city as well as the tourists headed for Antarctica. Ciudad (city) is not a legal designation in Chile and Argentina, except for the Autonomous City of Buenos Aires. Currently, three places use this slogan: Ushuaia in Argentina as well as Punta Arenas and Puerto Williams (Note: Attributed to multiple sources) in Chile, with the last being the absolute southernmost town by latitude. There are several more settlements further south but none are considered to be large enough to be classified as a 'city'. The three contending cities are from north to south:

- Punta Arenas (53°10′S 70°56′W, population: 123,403), literally in Spanish: "Sandy Point", is the oldest and largest city in Southern Patagonia, at the Strait of Magellan and the capital of the Magallanes and Antártica Chilena Region. It is the largest of the three contenders with around 130,000 permanent residents and it is called the southernmost city by some media outlets. The basis of its claim to be the southernmost city rests on it being larger than Ushuaia, Río Grande, and Puerto Williams, all of which are farther south.
- Ushuaia (54°48′S 68°18′W, population: 82,615), the capital of the Argentine province of Tierra del Fuego, is more commonly regarded as the southernmost city in the world due to its sufficiently large population, its infrastructure, and its accepted classification as a city. Ushuaia is located in a wide bay on the southern coast of the island of Tierra del Fuego, on the northern shore of the Beagle Channel; hence, it is further north than Puerto Williams.
- Puerto Williams (54°56′S 67°37′W, population: 1,868), located on Isla Navarino, is the southernmost town in the world on the southern shore of the Beagle Channel. It is the capital of the Antártica Chilena Province, one of four provinces located in the Magallanes and Antártica Chilena Region. Puerto Williams is sometimes considered the southernmost city in the world by Chilean media and some large media international organisations, (Note: Attributed to multiple sources) although it promotes itself with the slogan Puerto Williams, the southernmost town in the world in its tourism campaigns. It has a Naval Hospital of Puerto Williams, the Martin Gusinde Anthropological Museum, the Guardiamarina Zañartu Airport and a university campus and it is a naval base of the Chilean Navy.
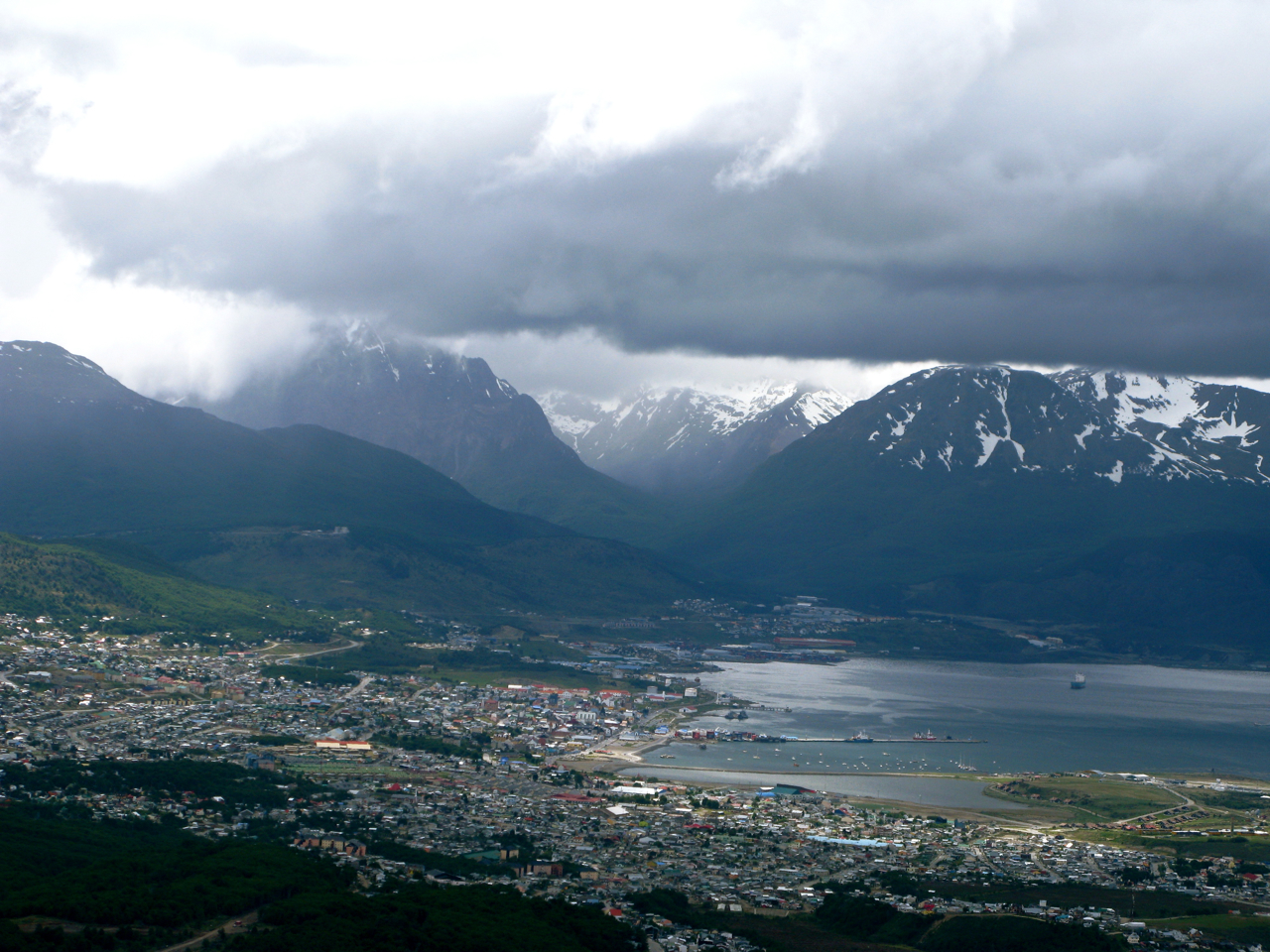
Ushuaia

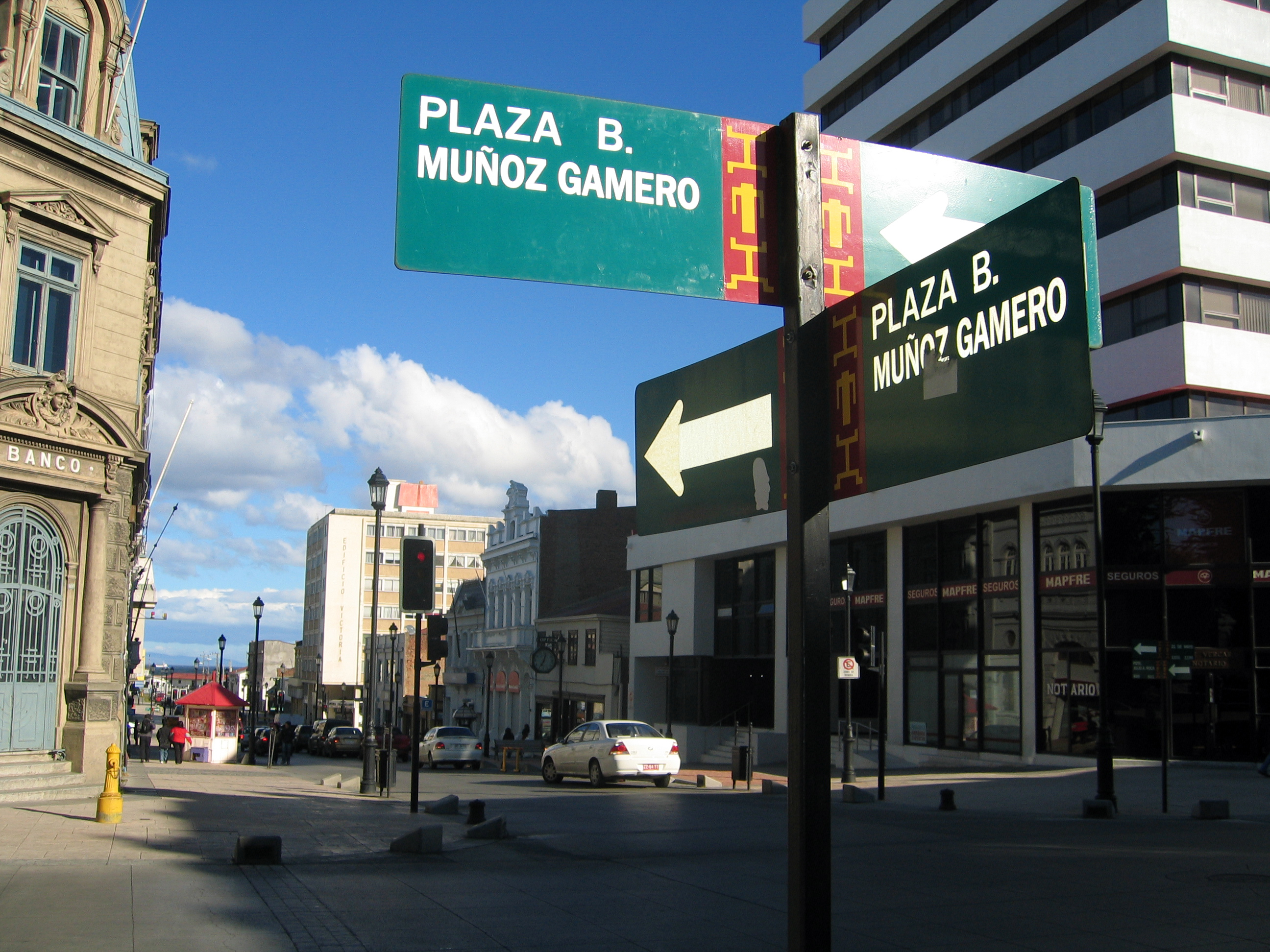
Punta Arenas city view

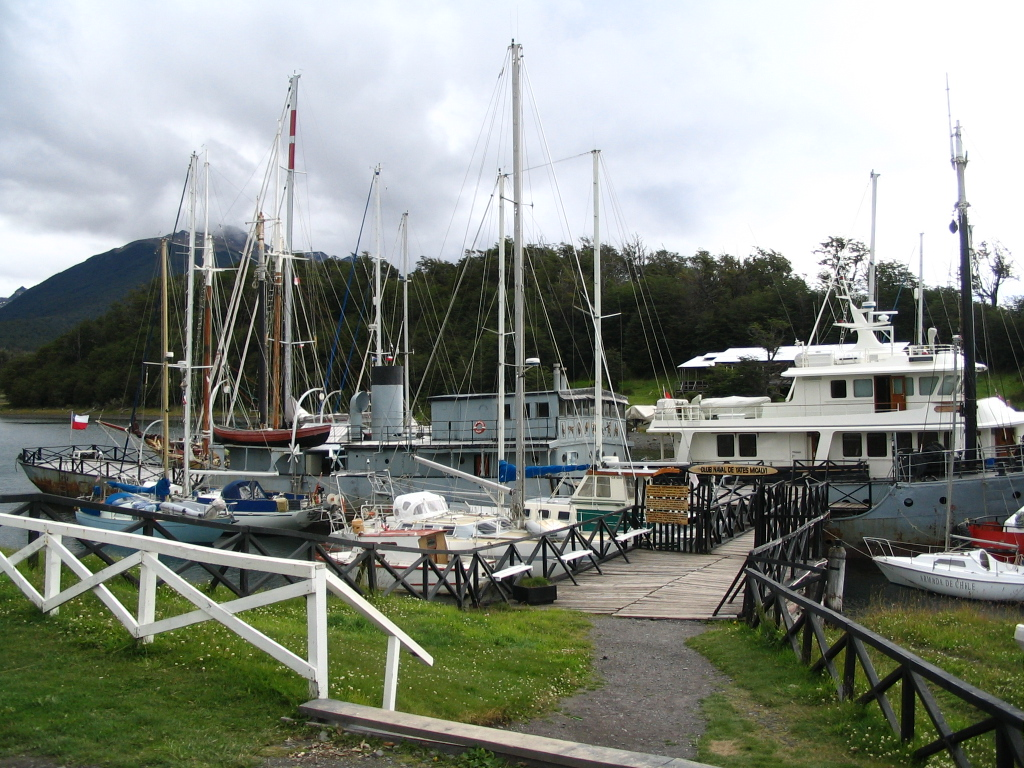
Puerto Williams, Micalvi yacht club

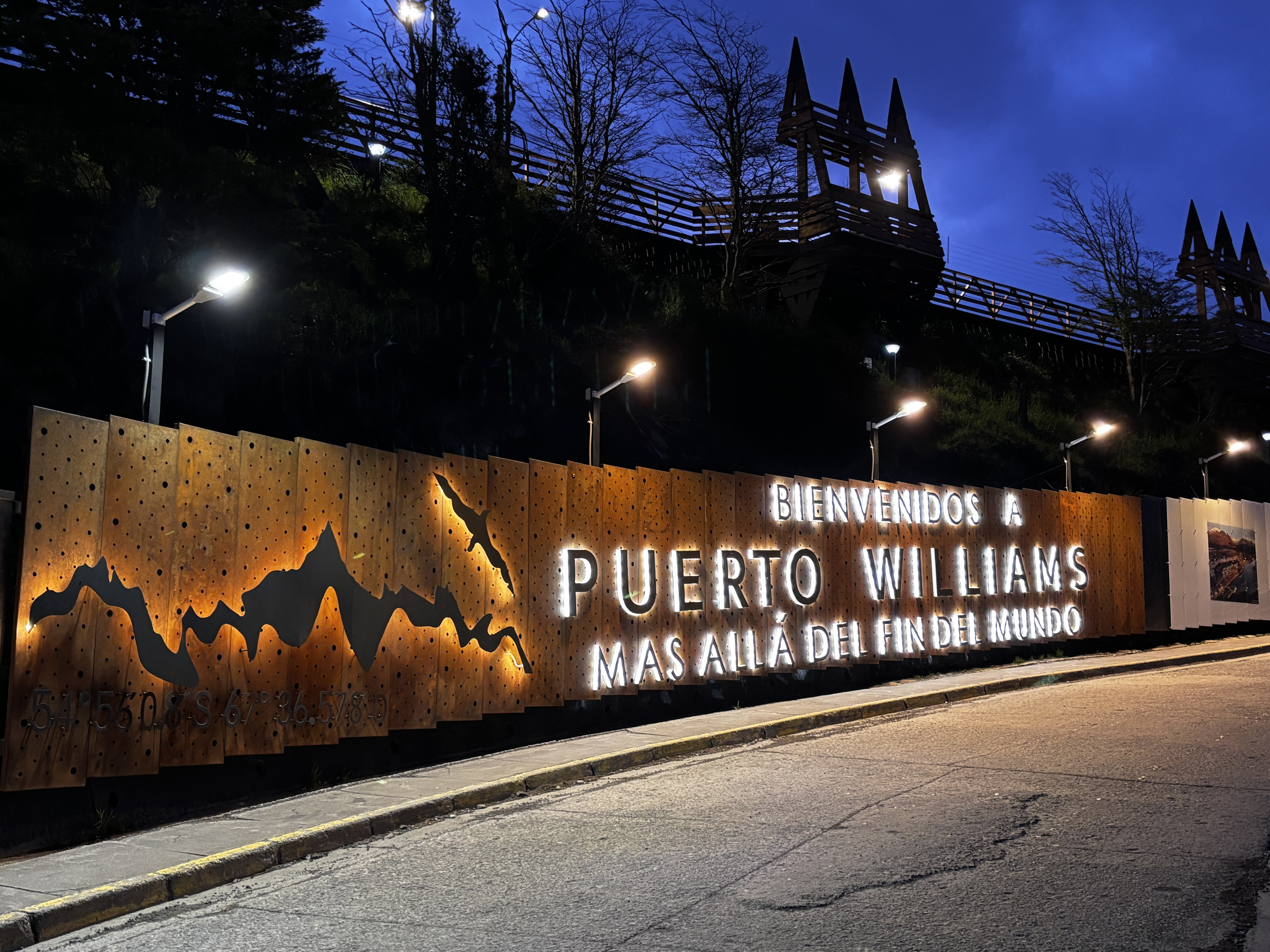
Puerto Williams' "Beyond the End of the World" sign

The southernmost city with a population of over one million is Melbourne, Australia. However, this city is not further south than 45 degrees, instead located around 37°48' south

== Settlements of more than 1,000 inhabitants south of 45°S ==
45th parallel south (interactive map)

This is a list of all settlements south of the 45th parallel south with over 1,000 permanent inhabitants.

Rank	Settlement name	Country	Population	Latitude/longitude	Köppen climate classification
1	Puerto Williams	Chile	1,868	54°56′S 67°37′W	ET
2	Ushuaia	Argentina	82,615	54°48′S 68°18′W	ET
3	Tolhuin	Argentina	9,879	54°32′S 67°12′W	ET
4	Río Grande	Argentina	98,017	53°47′S 67°42′W	Cfc
5	Porvenir	Chile	4,807	53°17′S 70°22′W	Cfc
6	Punta Arenas	Chile	123,403	53°10′S 70°56′W	Cfc
7	Puerto Natales	Chile	19,116	51°44′S 72°31′W	Cfb
8	Stanley	Falkland Islands	2,115	51°41′S 57°51′W	Cfc
9	Veintiocho de Noviembre	Argentina	4,686	51°39′S 69°13′W	Cfc
10	Río Gallegos	Argentina	110,435	51°38′S 69°13′W	BSk
11	Río Turbio	Argentina	6,650	51°31′S 72°17′W	Cfc
11	El Calafate	Argentina	6,410	50°19′S 72°17′W	BSk
12	Puerto Santa Cruz	Argentina	3,397	50°01′S 68°31′W	BSk
13	Comandante Luis Piedrabuena	Argentina	4,175	49°50′S 68°54′W	BSk
14	Puerto San Julián	Argentina	6,143	49°18′S 67°43′W	BSk
15	Gobernador Gregores	Argentina	2,519	48°45′S 70°16′W	BWk
16	Puerto Deseado	Argentina	10,237	47°45′S 65°55′W	BSk
17	Cochrane	Chile	2,217	47°15′S 72°34′W	Cfb
18	Pico Truncado	Argentina	14,985	46°47′S 67°58′W	BWk
19	Bluff	New Zealand	1,840	46°36′S 168°20′E	Cfb
20	Perito Moreno	Argentina	3,588	46°36′S 70°55′W	BSk
21	Las Heras	Argentina	10,688	46°33′S 68°57′W	BWk
22	Los Antiguos	Argentina	2,047	46°32′S 71°37′W	BSk
23	Chile Chico	Chile	3,042	46°32′S 71°43′W	Csb
24	Caleta Olivia	Argentina	36,077	46°26′S 67°32′W	BSk
25	Invercargill	New Zealand	51,200	46°25′S 168°18′E	Cfb
26	Riverton	New Zealand	1,700	46°21′S 168°01′E	Cfb
27	Balclutha	New Zealand	4,460	46°14′S 169°45′E	Cfb
28	Fairfax	New Zealand	1,911	46°12′S 168°2′E	Cfb
29	Mataura	New Zealand	1,670	46°11′S 168°52′E	Cfb
30	Winton	New Zealand	2,560	46°08′S 168°20′E	Cfb
31	Milton	New Zealand	2,120	46°07′S 169°58′E	Cfb
32	Gore	New Zealand	8,310	46°05′S 168°56′E	Cfb
33	Rada Tilly	Argentina	6,208	45°55′S 67°33′W	BSk
34	Comodoro Rivadavia	Argentina	182,631	45°52′S 67°30′W	BSk
35	Dunedin	New Zealand	104,000	45°52′S 170°30′E	Cfb
36	Río Mayo	Argentina	2,939	45°40′S 70°16′W	BSk
37	Sarmiento	Argentina	8,028	45°35′S 69°05′W	BSk
38	Waikouaiti	New Zealand	1,310	45°35′S 170°40′E	Cfb
39	Coihaique	Chile	50,041	45°34′S 72°04′W	Cfb
40	Puerto Chacabuco	Chile	1,243	45°29′S 72°50′W	Cfb
41	Te Anau	New Zealand	2,920	45°25′S 167°43′E	Cfb
42	Puerto Aisen	Chile	16,936	45°24′S 72°41′W	Cfb
43	Alexandra	New Zealand	5,860	45°14′S 169°22′E	BSk
44	Clyde	New Zealand	1,200	45°11′S 169°19′E	Cfb
45	Oamaru	New Zealand	14,300	45°05′S 170°58′E	Cfb
46	Cromwell	New Zealand	7,470	45°04′S 169°20′E	Cfb
47	Queenstown	New Zealand	29,000	45°01′S 168°39′E	Cfb
48	Alto Río Senguer	Argentina	1,454	45°01′S 70°49′W	Csc/Dsc

== Southernmost settlements outside Antarctica ==
This list of settlements excludes research stations in Antarctica and its surrounding islands.

#	Location	Country	Settlement type	Latitude	Population	Population as of	Köppen climate classification
1	Estación Naval; Islas Diego Ramirez	Chile	Naval station	56°30′ S	4	2017	ET
2	Estación Meteorológica de Cabo de Hornos	Chile	Weather station	55°59′ S	4	2008	ET
3	Puerto Toro	Chile	Hamlet	55°05′ S	36	2002	ET
4	Caleta Wulaia	Chile	Hamlet	55°02′ S	?	?	ET
5	Caleta Eugenia	Chile	Hamlet	54°56′ S	?	?	?
6	Puerto Williams	Chile	Town	54°56′ S	1,868	2002	Cfc
7	Puerto Navarino	Chile	Village	54°55′ S	?	?	Cfc
8	Puerto Almanza	Argentina	Village	54°52′ S	200	?	Cfc
9	Ushuaia	Argentina	City	54°48′ S	82,615	2010	Cfc
10	Tolhuin	Argentina	Town	54°31′ S	9,879	?	Cfc
11	Macquarie Island Station	Australia	Scientific research station	54°30′ S	20 to 40	?	ET
12	Grytviken	South Georgia and the South Sandwich Islands	Hamlet	54°19′ S	up to 18	?	ET
13	Río Grande	Argentina	City	53°45′ S	98,017	2010	Cfc/Dfc
14	Porvenir	Chile	Town	53°17′ S	5,465	?	Cfc
15	Punta Arenas	Chile	City	53°17′ S	123,403	2002	Cfc

- The former Argentine base Corbeta Uruguay (59°28′ S) in South Sandwich Islands was the southernmost settlement outside Antarctica from 1976–1982.

== Settlements on the Antarctic continent ==
There are many research stations in Antarctica, both permanent and summer only. Many of the stations are staffed all year. McMurdo Station is the largest with an average population of 1200.

A total of 30 countries (as of October 2006), all signatory to the Antarctic Treaty, operate seasonal (summer) or year-round research stations on the continent and on its surrounding islands. In addition to these permanent stations, approximately 30 field camps are established each austral summer to support specific one-off projects.

== See also ==
- Northernmost settlements
- Extremes on Earth
- List of southernmost items

== Bibliography ==
- L. Ivanov and N. Ivanova. Southernmost city. In: The World of Antarctica. Generis Publishing, 2022. pp. 126-130. ISBN 979-8-88676-403-1
