= Río Turbio =

Turbio or Río Turbio, Spanish for muddy river or cloudy river, may refer to:

- Río Turbio, Santa Cruz Province, a town in Argentina
- Rio Turbio Airport, an airport near the town in Santa Cruz Province, Argentina
- Turbio River (Patagonia), a river in Santa Cruz Province, Argentina
- Turbio River (Jorquera), a river in the Atacama Region, Chile
- Turbio River (Elqui), a tributary to the Elqui River in the Coquimbo Region, Chile
- Turbio River (Mexico), a tributary to the Lerma in Guanajuato
- Turbio River (Venezuela), a tributary of the Cojedes River in Lara and Yaracuy
