= Rio Turbio Railway =

Railway in Argentina

Río Turbio Industrial Rail Line
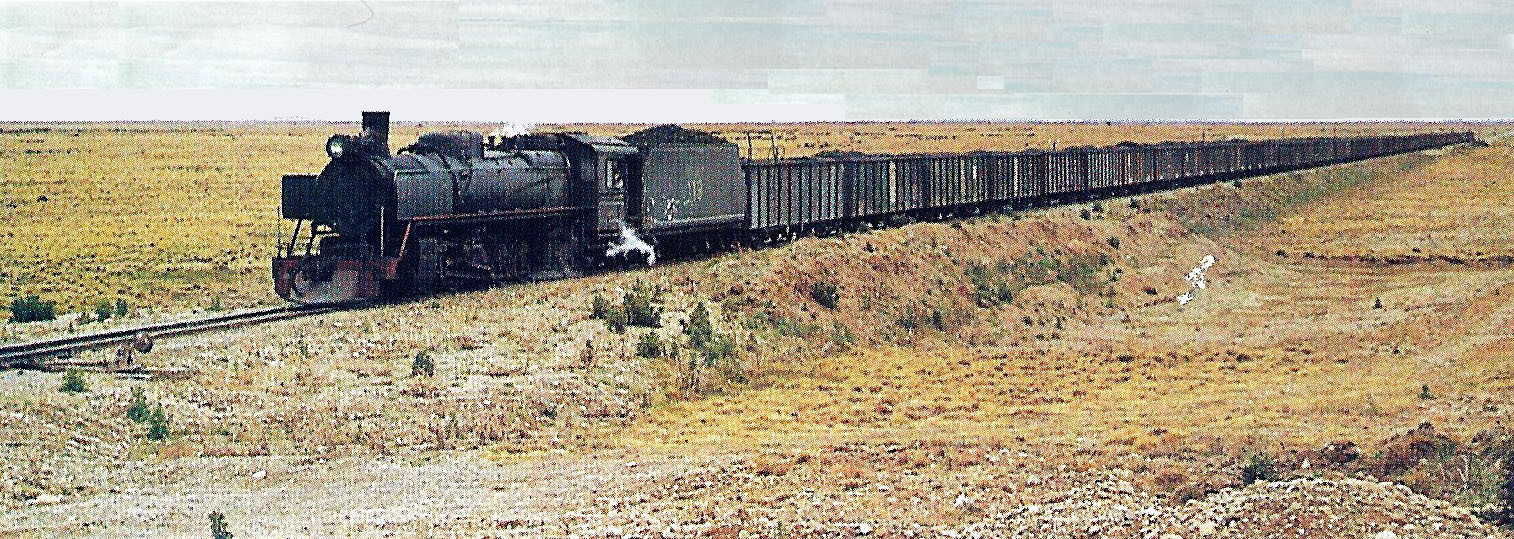
- Train near Rio Gallegos with 60 coal wagons in tow, December 1973

Overview
- Native name: Ramal Ferro Industrial Río Turbio
- Status: Inactive
- Owner: Government of Argentina
- Locale: Santa Cruz Province
- Termini: Punta Loyola; Río Turbio

Service
- Type: Freight
- Operator(s): YCF (1958–1994); YCRT (1994–2009)

History
- Commenced: 1950
- Opened: 1951
- Completed: 1951
- Closed: 2009; 17 years ago

Technical
- Line length: 285 km (177 mi)
- Number of tracks: 1
- Track gauge: 750 mm (2 ft 5 1/2 in)
Route map
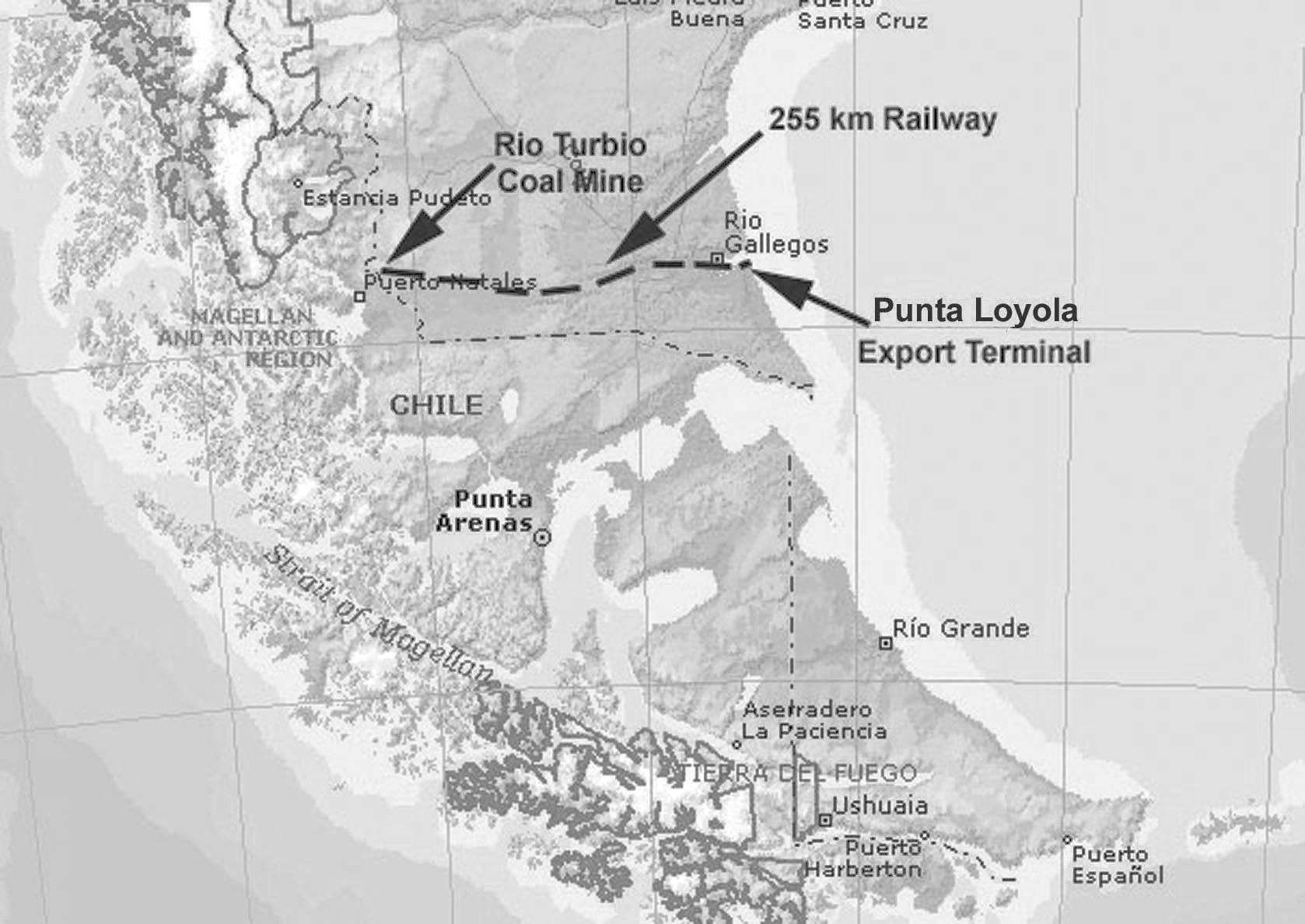

The Río Turbio Industrial Rail Line (Spanish: Ramal Ferro Industrial de Río Turbio) is a 285 km (177 mi) 750 mm (30 in) gauge railway that crosses the breadth of Patagonia, from the mining township of Río Turbio on the Chilean border to Punta Loyola, a port distant 20 km from Rio Gallegos on the Atlantic Coast.

The line was initially named "Ramal Ferro Industrial Eva Perón" but after the 1955 coup d'etat that removed president Juan Perón, the militar government renamed it "Ramal Ferro Industrial Río Turbio". The line runs alongside National Route 40.

== History ==
=== Background ===
The first intention was to build a railway that would pass through El Zurdo to the port of Santa Cruz. The idea was abandoned when estimates on the amount of coal reserves were lowered. However, in 1946 estimates of 100,000,000 tons renewed interest. A new route was measured through the valleys of Río Turbio and Río Gallegos. It was only two-thirds the distance to Puerto Santa Cruz. The new route had less steep slopes and fewer snow. A report from 1949 suggested that the last design changes were made very late.

The owner of the mines, state-owned business Yacimientos Carboníferos Fiscales, was looking for an easy way to build the line. The solution was to use 750 mm (2 ft 5 1/2 in) narrow gauge material that was still in storage in Puerto Madryn, unused since the abandonment of the studies in 1922. 300 km (190 mi) of 17.36 kg/m (35.0 lb/yd) rails were available there, and another 9 km (5.6 mi) of similar material stored in Río Grande, all that material had been planned to be used in the railway to Tolhuin in Tierra del Fuego. The FC Belgrano division of Ferrocarriles Argentinos provided 500,000 sleepers.

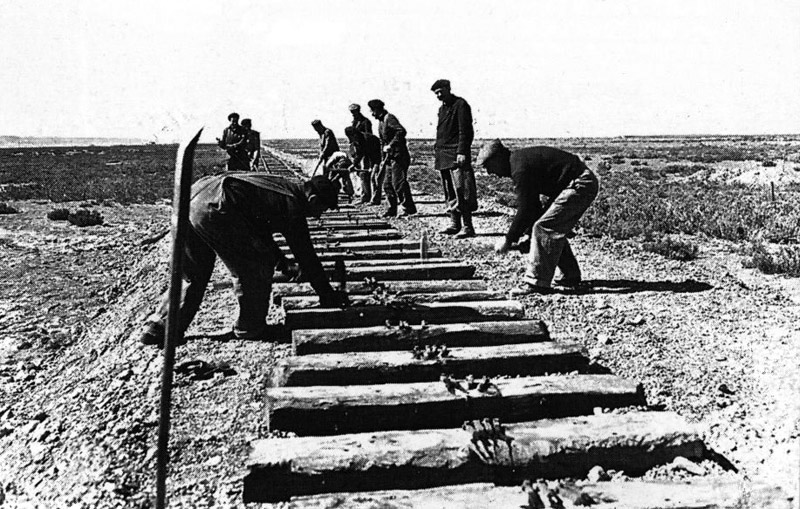
Workers during the construction of the line

Due to the Patagonian climate, all works had to be done during the months of October to April. The unloading of the material on the beach of Río Gallegos began in May 1950. 50,000 tons arrived this way because Río Gallegos did not have a port at that time. 250,000 broad gauge sleepers were obtained from the FC Roca, which were cut in two to double the number for the narrow gauge. A variety of accessories, such as shift levers, arrived from various parts of the newly nationalized railway network.

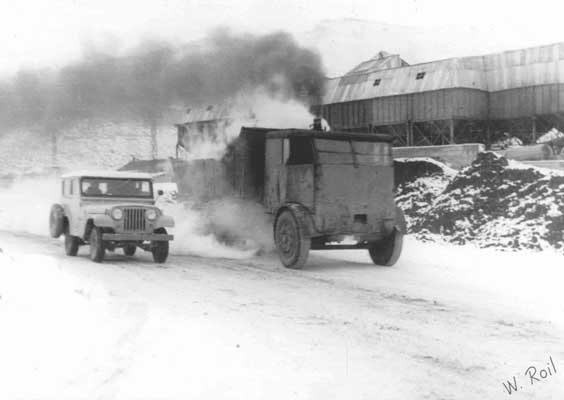
A Sentinel S-6 steam truck in Rio Turbio coal mines, Santa Cruz, Argentina. Those trucks were the last series produced in 1949 by Sentinel Waggon Works Ltd., Shrewsbury, England, and nicknamed "chufi" (choofie) by the locals

To transport the coal from the mine to the port before the completion of the railway branch, a fleet of 110 12-ton capacity steam trucks manufactured by the Sentinel Waggon Works was used. Those wagons replaced the gasoline trucks that used more energy than the coal they transported.

Engineer Atilio Cappa, an employee of the Ministry of Public Works, was in charge of the works. A departure from traditional practice was the use of internal combustion engine trucks to carry materials further outside the rail points. In May 1951 all but 3 km (1.9 mi) were finished. It was completed in September after passing through the harsh winter.

=== Operations ===
The line was inaugurated in November 1951 in to haul coal from Argentina's only coal mine at Rio Turbio to the port of Rio Gallegos for ongoing transportation by ship to Buenos Aires where it was used to generate electricity. Until the inauguration of a new pier in Río Gallegos in August 1952, all construction materials were unloaded and all coal was loaded from the beach. The YPF division that exploited the extraction of carbon, named, "Combustibles Sólidos Minerales" (CSM), initially used the Bahia Aguirre steamship and then purchased two landing crafts from the US Navy.

The main customer of coal was the new power plant of San Nicolás de los Arroyos. Although the Perón's administration encouraged the use of coal from Río Turbio in other activities such as the meat processing plant in Puerto Deseado, it was difficult to find willing private clients. For most of the life of the mine, almost all of the coal has gone to public uses. A new processing plant was inaugurated in 1958 with a capacity of 250 tons per hour. New ships were purchased, and coal emerged from the shadows of the oil industry via the creation of "Yacimientos Carboniferos Fiscales which was taken over by CSM, including the mine and the railroad.

850,000 tons of coal were transported each year in the line’s heyday in the 1960s.

Traffic gradually declined through the 1970s and 1980s. Notwithstanding, in the late 1980s a large investment was made in the development of a new coal export terminal at Punta Loyola near the mouth of the Rio Gallegos (River Gallegos) on its southern bank, a few kilometres downstream of the township. The rail connection was not completed until 1996 when the first trains reached the port.

In 1994 the Argentinian government had “privatised” the railway by selling a 10 year concession to a consortium of investors, the Yacimientos Carboníferos Río Turbio (YCRT), to take over the operation of the railway.

YCRT withdrew the steam locomotive fleet, replacing it with three second-hand diesel-hydraulic locomotives imported from Romania. These quickly proved unreliable and expensive to maintain, and it was not long before two of them were taken out of service.

By 2005, the line had ceased to operate, but its infrastructure was left in place in case economic circumstances changed to justify reinstating rail haulage operations.

The service was deactivated in 2009. Occasional trains were run over the line since then, but in 2022 it was reported that only 1,000 tons were transported to Punta Loyola, the remainder of the mine's production being used in the township's power station.

Several proposals were put forward to develop Rio Turbio into a “steam centre” to attract tourists. These included a 2004 plan to build a new tourist railway from Río Turbio across the Chilean border to the tourist port of Puerto Natales on the Pacific coast. Two or three of the Santa Fe locomotives were overhauled for this purpose and it was even proposed that they might resume haulage of coal trains, given their ability to consume the indigenous fuel. However, by 2022 these plans had come to nothing and there appears to be little prospect of the railway being put back into operation.

== Rolling stock ==
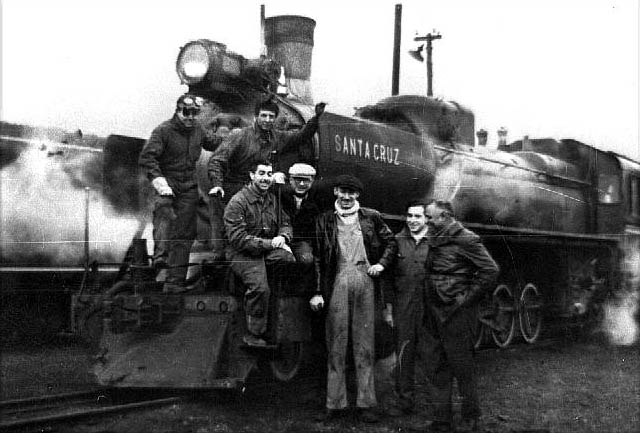
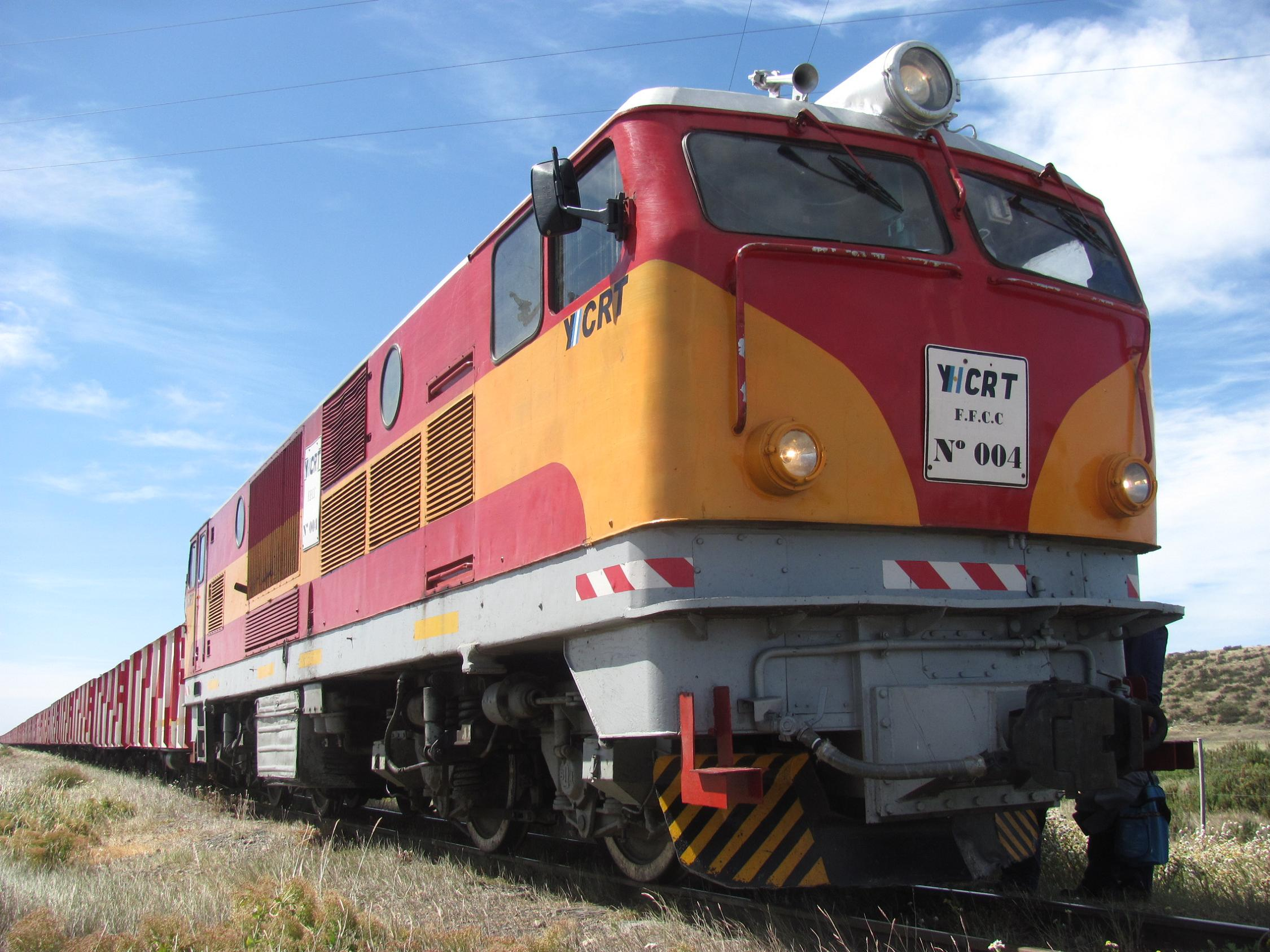
(Left) Engineer Livio Porta and crew posing with a Mitsubishi locomotive, c. 1956; (right): Locomotive used by YCRT (successor of YCF) in 2013

The line was famed for its diminutive Santa Fe (2-10-2) locomotives, 20 of which were built by Mitsubishi between 1956 and 1964. Besides, eight Henschel & Son locomotives were transferred from Central Chubut Railway to the RFIRT. Wagons were provided by the Argentine Navy.

In the 1960s the renowned locomotive engineer Livio Porta was appointed General Manager of the railway, whereupon he carried out a number of modifications to several of the locomotives, which proved themselves capable of hauling trains weighing 1,700 tons over the winding and poorly constructed track – an astonishing figure for any steam locomotive, let alone ones weighing only 48 tons and having an adhesive weight of just 38 tons.

In 1996 Bulgarian diesel locomotives were added to the fleet.
