= Sawt =

Sawt may refer to:

- Sawt (music), a folk music genre from Kuwait and Bahrain
- Śawt, a letter in the Ge'ez alphabet
- Rio Turbio Airport, Argentina (ICAO code: SAWT)
