= Manchado =

Manchado is a surname. Notable people with the surname include:

- Dora Manchado, Last speaker of Tehuelche language
- Marisa Manchado (1956–2026), Spanish composer

== See also ==
- Cardenal manchado, fish species
- Tiro manchado, fish species
