= Julie Dufour =

Julie Dufour may refer to:

- Julie Dufour (politician)
- Julie Dufour (footballer)

== See also ==
- Julia Dufour, a village and municipality in Santa Cruz Province, Argentina
