= Yacimientos Carboníferos Río Turbio =

Coal mining company in Santa Cruz, Argentina

Yacimientos Carboníferos Río Turbio (YCRT)
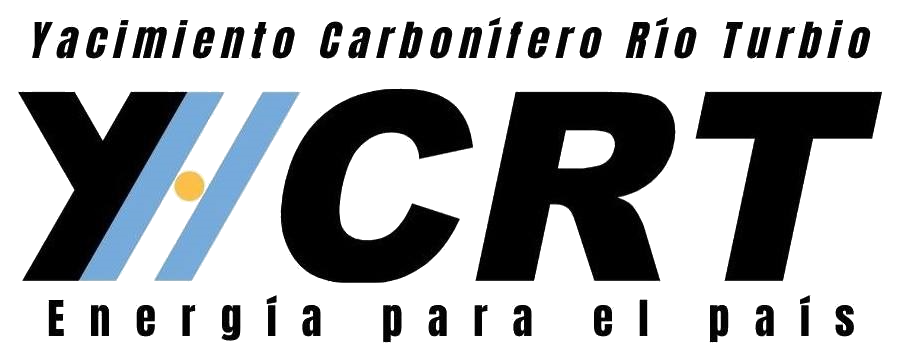

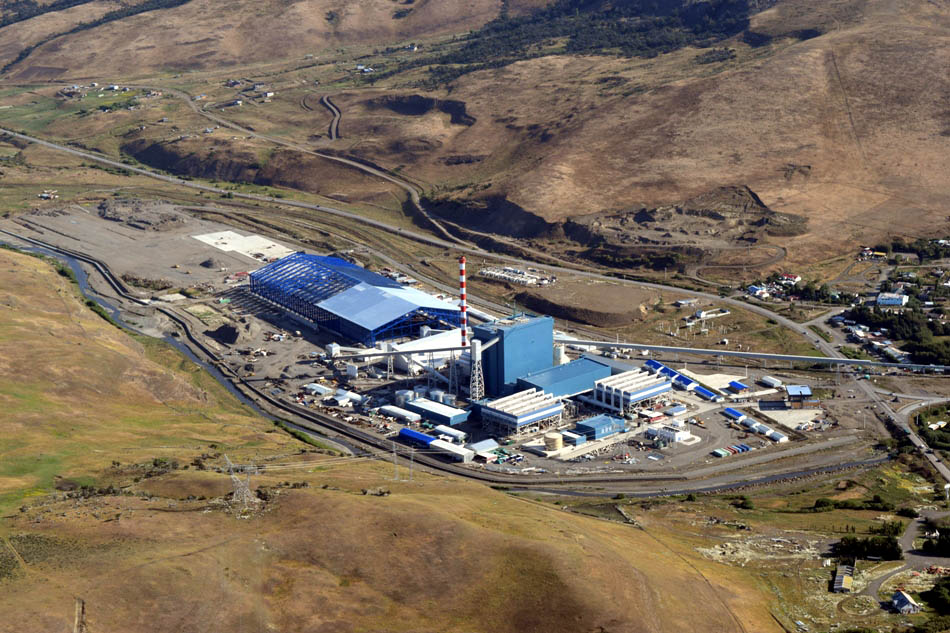
- Aerial view of the coal mines
- Type: State-owned
- Industry: Mining
- Predecessor: YCF
- Founded: 1994; 32 years ago
- Headquarters: Río Turbio, Santa Cruz, Argentina
- Area served: Argentina
- Key people: Thierry Decoud (Controller)
- Services: Coal mining
- Owner: Government of Argentina
- Parent: Ministry of Economy
- Divisions: Rio Turbio Railway
- Website: ycrt.gob.ar

Yacimientos Carboníferos Río Turbio (English: Rio Turbio Coal Mines, abbrevriated YCRT) is an Argentine coal mining company created in 1994 to replace Yacimientos Carboníferos Fiscales, along with the privatization of many other state-owned enterprises, the trademark of the national administration of the time. It was created to extract, ship and sell the coal from Rio Turbio and its coal basin. It is the only coal mine in all of Argentina and a geopolitical key are, since it is located in the south west extreme of the country, one of the furthest south settlements of the country.

YCRT runs the Río Turbio coal mine, in the southern province of Santa Cruz, along the Andes border with Chile. It also has a rail line connecting to the Punta Loyola port, a 25 MW power station for internal use, and a 240 MW thermal power station (under construction) linked to the Argentinian Interconnection.

It was a privately managed company between 1994 and 2002, when the government intervened it because of a bankruptcy claim. The current state-designated comptroller who runs the company is Germán Arribas. Despite being under public administration since 2002, it still has a legal form of Sociedad Anónima.

It is expected that during 2002 the 240 MW thermal power plant will be finally completed and start providing energy to the country.

== History ==
=== Yacimientos Carboníferos Fiscales ===
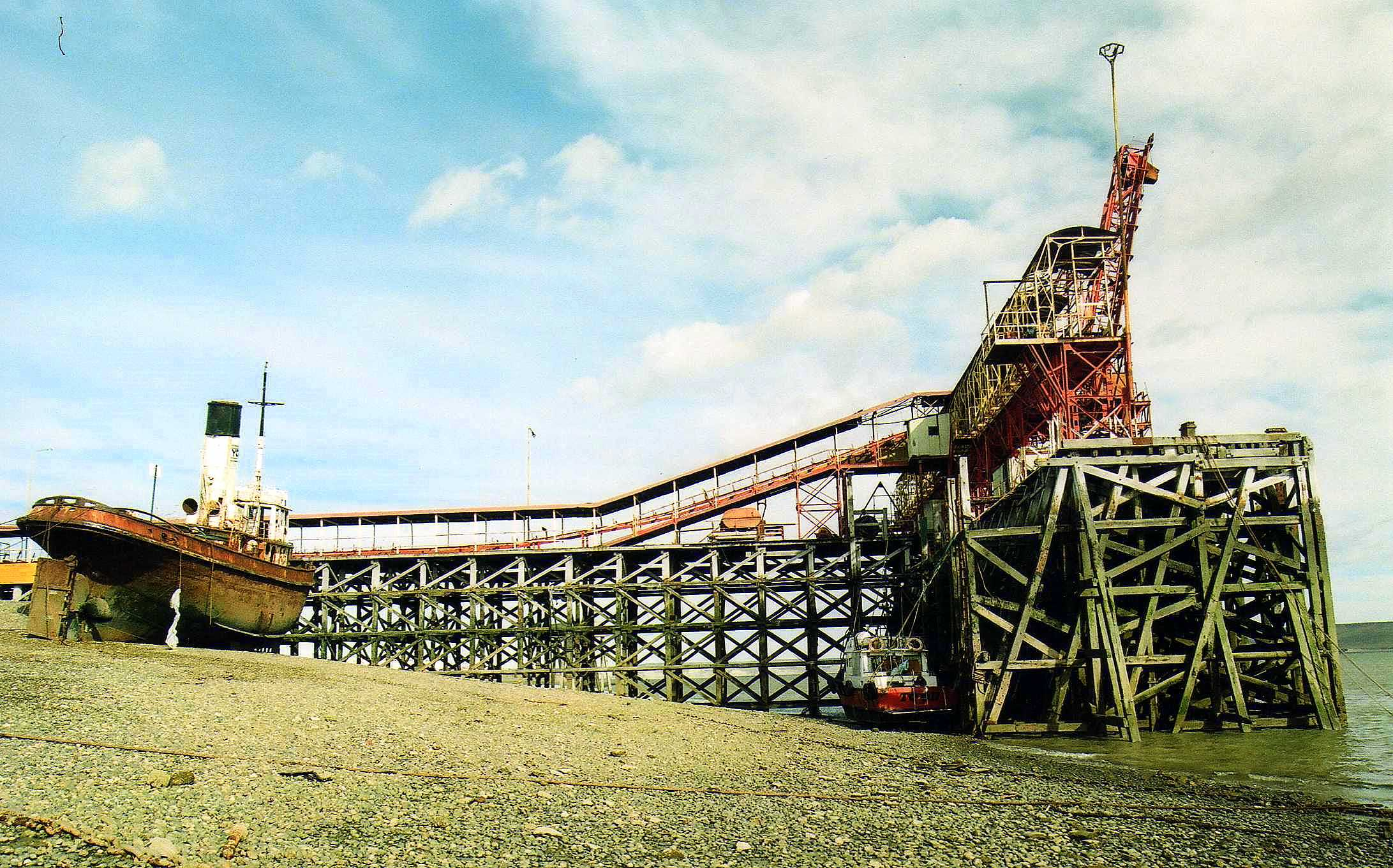
Old pier of YCF in Río Gallegos

Carbon mining began in the 1940s in Argentina, ran by the national oil company, YPF.

In August 1958 Yacimientos Carboníferos Fiscales was created, with the mission of running the country mines. It was a spin-off of the Mineral Carbon division of YPF. The company was launched including extraction facilities, sewage treatment, a railway, a port terminal in Rio Gallegos, and a fleet of three ships.

In the midst of an energy crisis in the country, and with the difficulties for importing coal caused by the world wars, the country favored the development of national coal mines.

The company found trouble selling its production (selling an average of just 76.4% of its production between 195 and 1990), caused by a lack of interest of carbon as a power source. By the 1990s it was highly unprofitable, so YCF was (as many other public companies at that time) privatized.

=== Privatization and creation of YCRT ===
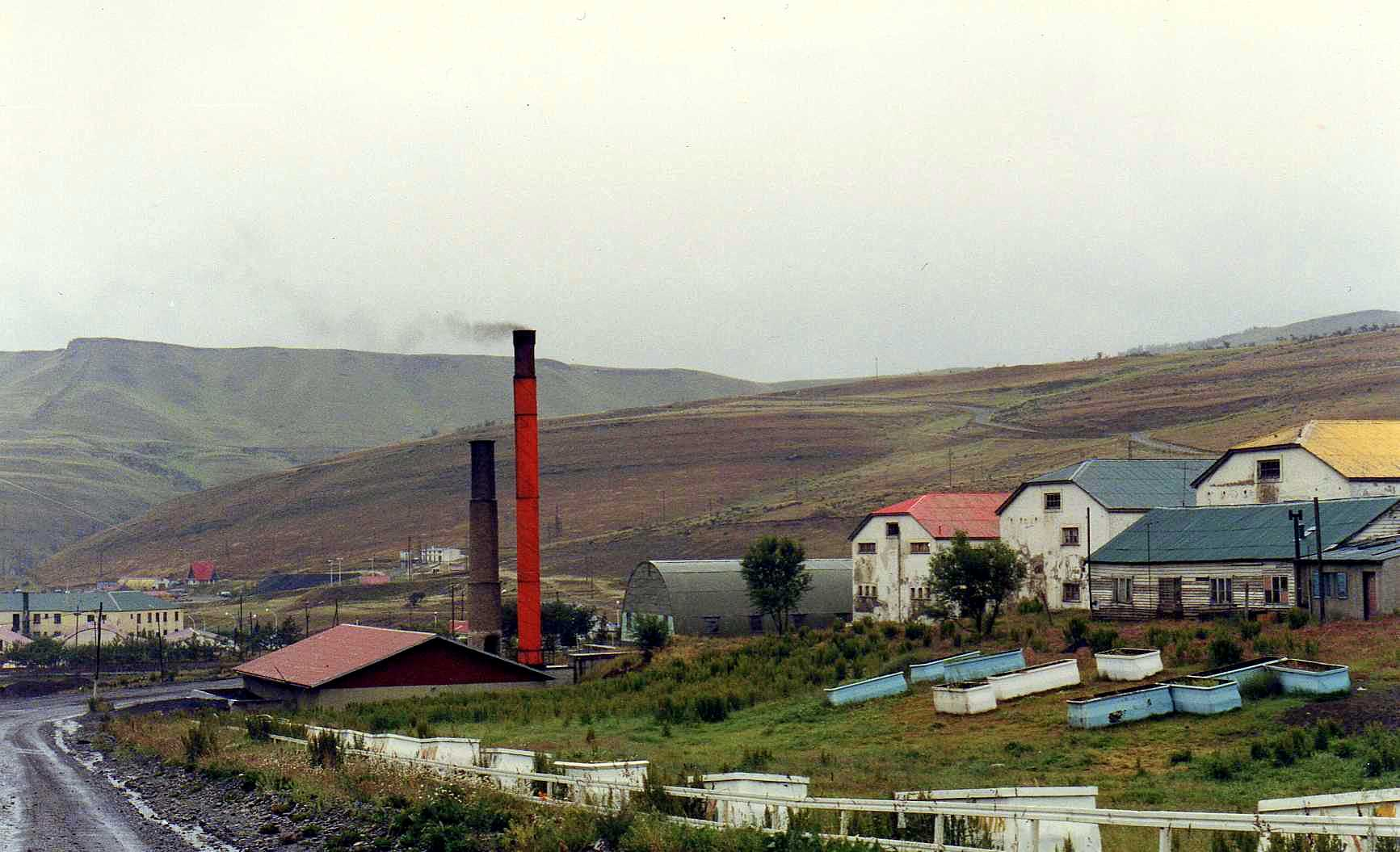
Rio Turbio town

In 1993, then-president Carlos Menem issued the 988 act, which mandated the privatization of YCF through a concession, for a maximum period of 20 years.

Prior to granting the company in concession, the State executed a rationalization plan for it, including workforce reduction, liquidation of assets, and the transfer to the Santa Cruz province state of several public services previously offered by YCF.

The privatization would become effective a year later, when a consortium led by the Taselli Group (which came to be a big group at that time, winning the bids for several privatization, that would years later lose) won a public bid for YCF, changing it denomination to YCRT S.A.. This consortium included several companies, such as "Dragados y Obras Portuarias SA" (DyOPSA), Eleprint S.A., IATE S.A., and the union (Argentine Federation of Light and Energy Union Workers (Spanish: Federación Argentina de Trabajadores de Luz y Fuerza, FATLyF). It also had technical assessment from Skoda, with no equity participation for the Czech company.

In the privatization contract, a public subsidy of 22.5 million pesos (equivalent to US$22.5 million at that time) was granted for the first 10 years of private operation. Also, the new private company received a new coal contract with the thermal power station of San Nicolás (by then, run by Agua y Energía Eléctrica, a public energy company, it would be later sold to AES Corporation) that mandated the power station to buy coal from Rio Turbio at a 20% higher mark than the international price. This was the only power plant in Argentina relying on coal as fuel, all the other thermal plants used oil and gas.

Still, the Taselli group didn't manage to comply with the minimum production rate, neither with the required investment levels. During the time it managed the company, there were layoffs, YCRT machinery was illegally transferred to other companies of the group, and the subsidies also rerouted to other companies (primarily Parmalat).

In August 2001, the government stopped the subsidy and the San Nicolás power plant halted its coal purchases. In January 2002, the Taselli group abandoned the company, which in May declared insolvency procedures. For this actions, Sergio Taselli, the businessman behind the Taselli group went to trial, under the alleged crime of fraudulent administration with the aggravating circumstance of being committed to the detriment of the State or public administration.

=== Back to public administration ===
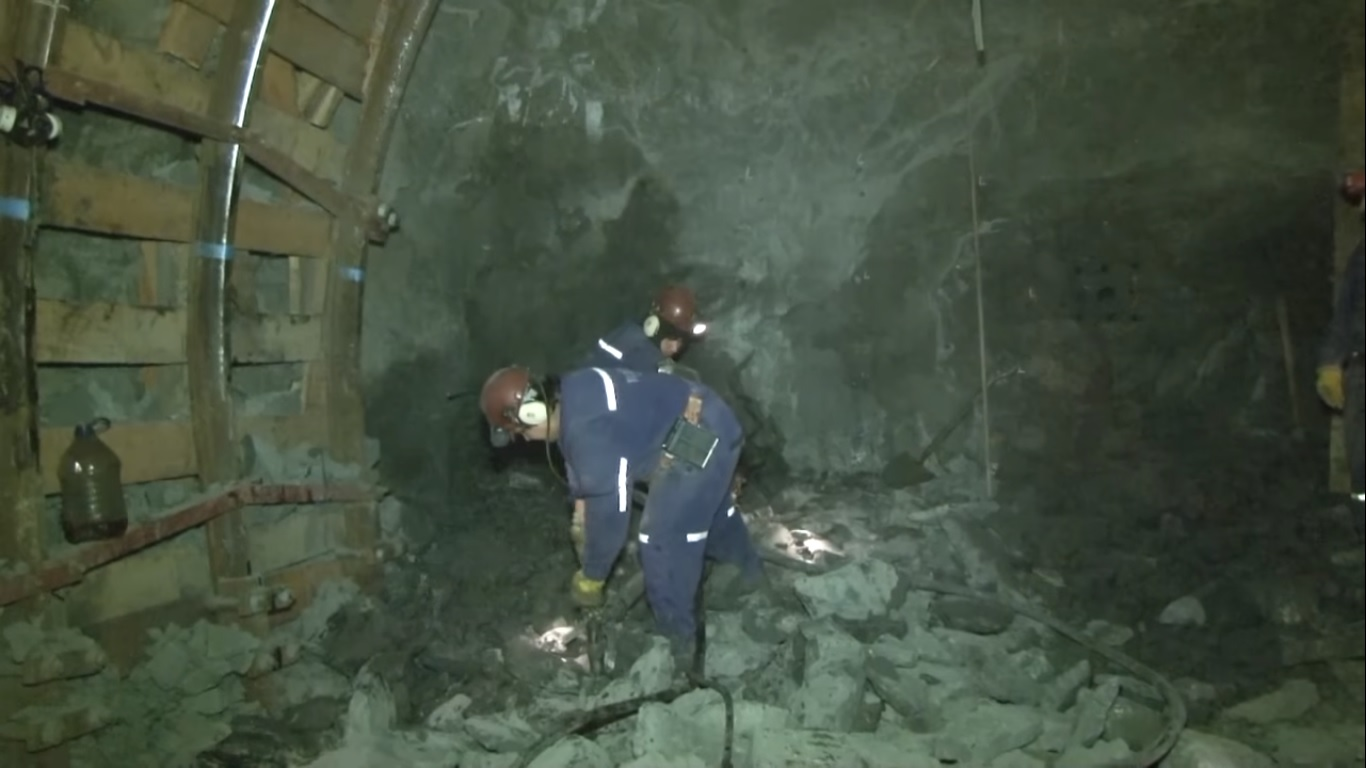
Interior of the mine (2013)

In 2002, then-interim president Eduardo Duhalde decided to intervene the company with the 1034/2002 act, becoming the first privatized company back to public administration. Despite receiving an abandoned company, lacking a public company legal entity or even statutes that defined the operation and structure of the company, it was decided that the company would still operate, and Eduardo Arnold was named by the state as comptroller. This decision to keeping open the run-down company was taken because it is the main economic activity of the Rio Turbio area.

In 2004, there was a fire followed by a collapse in the mine. 14 miners died. The incident happened during a shift change, and started in a conveyor belt. High levels of Carbon monoxide were registered, fueled by a big number of plastics and rubber objects burning. ATE, a public workers union in Argentina, described the fire as "a latent danger we have been reporting for years" and questioned "the lack of alarm systems and sensors for the conveyer belt, which never worked at the moment of the fire", blaming the accident on the lack of investment and control from the central government.

The "Work Risks Superintendence" (Superintendencia de Riesgos del Trabajo) reported that the Río Turbio mine showed an accident rate that doubled the mining sector average. According to the criminal investigation, the worker responsible for the safety where the fire started had been laid off before the incident.

After the incident, then-controller Esteban Loncaric resigned and the government designated Daniel Peralta (who would later become governor of the province) in his place.

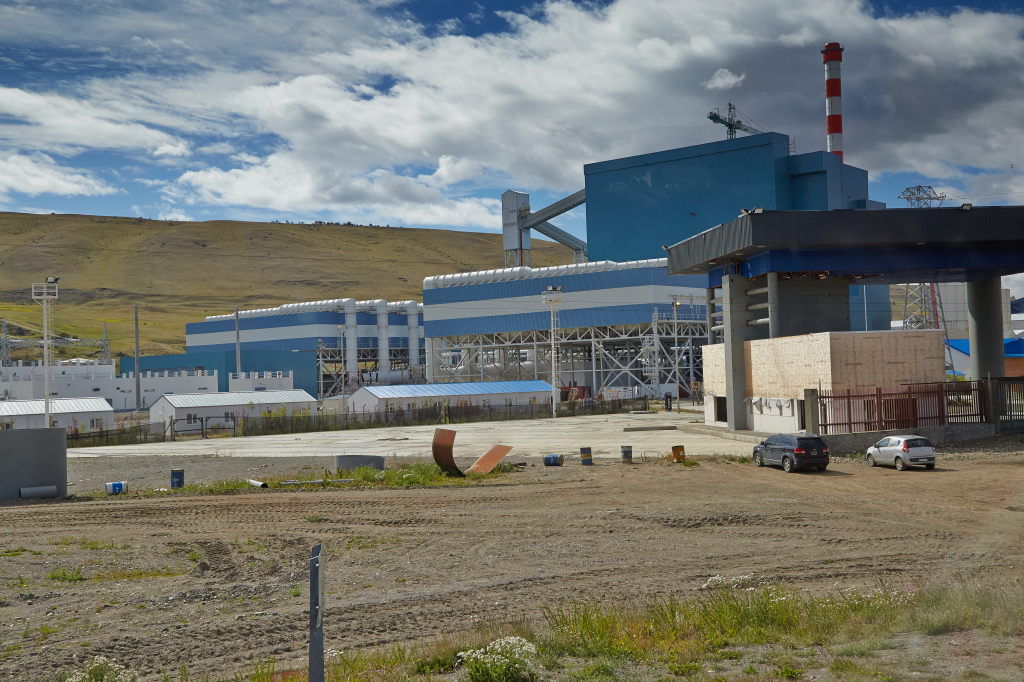
Rio Turbio thermal Power Plant

In December 2004, the Ministry of Federal Planning (headed by Julio de Vido) announced the construction of a 35 MW thermal power station, a 40 million dollars investment. It would be built by Skoda.

In 2006, Julio de Vido announced the construction of a 240 MW thermal power station in Rio Turbio, aimed not only for energy generation, but also for demand creation for the mine's coal. It was then announced that the works would last three and a half-years (finishing in 2011), 1400 jobs would be created, and the energy would be turned over to the national interconnection for its use in the whole country.

This new power plant would demand 1.2 million tonnes of coal a year, which would be a powerful incentive for increasing the mine production. It would also be able to process the coal without having to purify it. During the construction, several changes to the works were approved, which caused several delays. It would be built by Isolux Corsan, after outbiding a consortium formed by Roggio Group and Skoda in a public tender. The winning company and its management is under investigation by the Spanish Justice for bribery in the Rio Turbio case.

In September 2015, the ignition process for the first module of the power plant began, using fuel oil. This process was estimated to last 12 months, but was interrupted two months later, in November 2015.

Also in September 2015, then-president Cristina Fernández de Kirchner carried out a symbolic start-up of a turbine at the plant for its inauguration. The second turbine was still under construction, therefore the power plant was still not finished, producing only 23 of the 240 MW it was designed for. The total investment in the power plant accumulated US$700 million as 2015.

=== Attempt of creation of a new public company ===
YCRT S.A. is, since 2002, in a precarious legal status, being intervened (administrated) by the government while still being a sociedad anónima. The company does not have the legal entity type of a state-owned enterprise, neither an organic law that establishes its internal structure, what would bring certainty and transparence to the operation. This kind of state-intervention in Argentina is, by nature, only temporary, with the mission to regularizing an anomalous situation within a company.

With this concern, in November 2015, months before a new government took office, the Argentine Chamber of Deputies approved a bill to create a new state-owned company, called Yacimientos Carboníferos Fiscales Sociedad del Estado (YCFSE), that would control the mine, the rail and port, and the Río Turbio Power Plant.

The billed was blocked in the Argentine Senate due to not accomplishing quorum. A new was tried in 2016, but was also unsuccessful.

=== YCRT Today ===
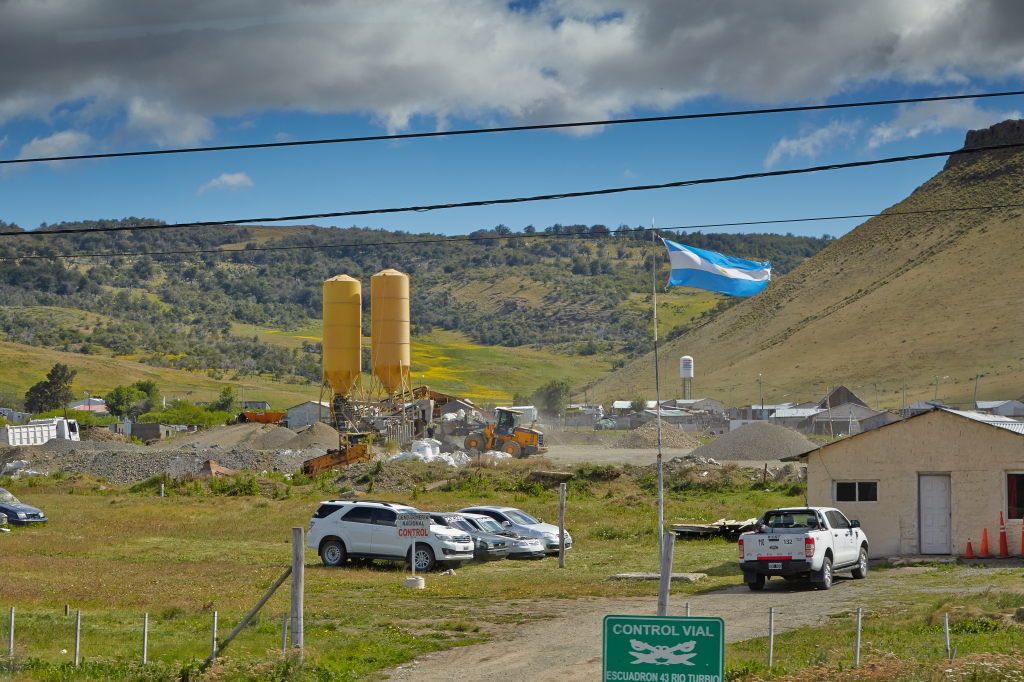
Rio Turbio in 2016

In December 2015, the Mauricio Macri government took office, with a strong promise to eradicate corruption. In February 2016, it ordered an Audit on the Río Turbio thermal power plant to be made by the Sindicatura General de la Nación, halting works in the middletime. This also happened to other public works on that year, under presumptions of generalized corruption during the Kirchner administration.

By then, the power plant had a completed turbine, and a second turbine with "a between 17 and 25% of remaining works to completion" as stated by the Rio Turbio city Intendant, who would later be detained for alleged corruption in the power plant works.

The audit led to 13 criminal cases for corruption. This audit was criticized by unions, who claimed it had halted the mine activity for too long.

By 2016, 470 miners had dismissal telegrams sent to, of which 270 accepted voluntary retirement agreements. It was calculated that by this year, 2500 people had left town in the mine influence area.

In July 2017, some miners claimed that the company was a possible company lockout taking place.

In October 2017, former minister Julio de Vido was detained (after a desafuero process to remove his Deputy immunity privileges) charged with fraudulent administration of Rio Turbio for the amount of 265 million pesos. Roberto Baratta, a union president, was also jailed on these charges.

In March 2018, the construction contract with Isolux for the power plant was cancelled, due to company-side breach of contract. This was based on several breaches, including delays, lack of preservation of the structure integrity, losing manufacturer guarantee in several components caused by delays, among others. The construction company was on insolvency claims at that time, having abandoned other public works in the country, as Paseo del Bajo for instance. No other company took on the power plant construction since then. By this moment, 1607 million dollars had been spent on the construction of the power plant.

Juan Carlos Lascurain, former president of the Argentine Industrial Union was jailed in March 2018 for alleged irregularities in the YCRT renovation projects.

In the first months of 2019, the port of Punta Loyola began operating again. YCRT made its first export in six years from this facility, a 25 thousand tons of coal shipment sent to Brazil. Contracts to provide coal to Lime kilns in San Juan and Mendoza were signed. The mine went back to producing coal regularly for the first time in ten years, producing 30 thousand tonnes a month.

By the end of the Omar Zeidán administration as a state-appointed comptroller, 79 workers had been laid off and 500 took voluntary retirements. At this time, the company had an operational income of 43 million pesos against a 2338 million operational expenditure.

In 2020, while the new Alberto Fernández government took office, Aníbal Fernández was appointed as comptroller (interventor) for YCRT. 20 days after that, 417 workers appointed by the previous administration were laid off. In words of Anibal Fernandez, those were not layoffs but reversals of wrong hires. The laid off workers had no support from the unions.

The new government indicated its will to finish construction of the power plant and making the company more productive. They marked as issues the six-hours shifts and many holidays, elements mandated by unions on which the mine operates. In June 2020, a spill of over 2,000 and 3,000 litres of oil over the Primavera river was caused by the freezing and breakage of pipes in the internal power station of the mine. This incident was reported to the Santa Cruz environment agency by the "Luz y Fuerza" union.

The first 120 MW turbine started in 2022. In 2024, Law 27,742 allowed for the partial re-privatization of YCRT.

== Industrial Rail Line ==
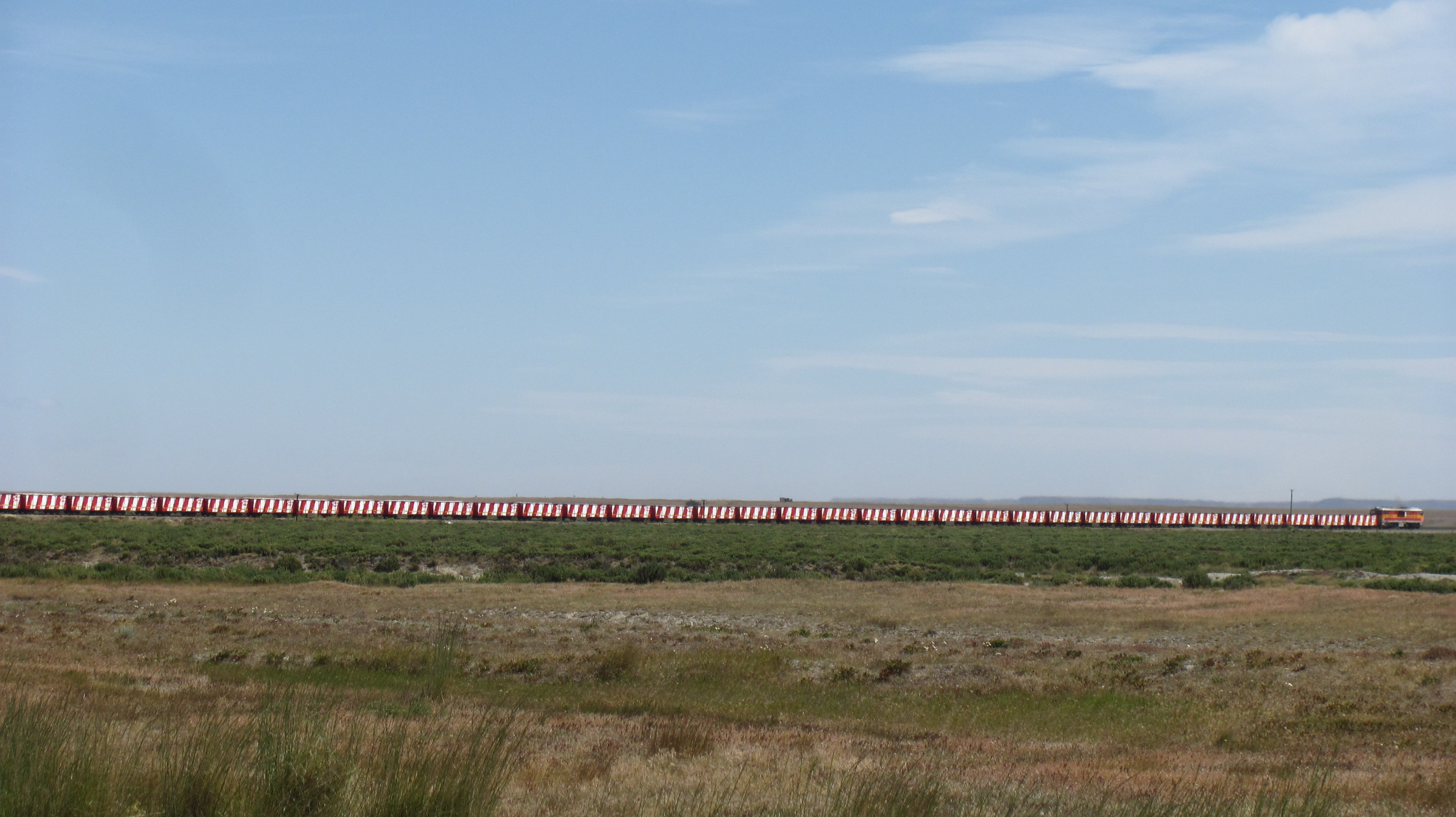
Rio Turbio Freight Train

The mine has its own industrial rail line for coal transport to the Punta Loyola port, a 285 kilometres (177 mi) long route. It is the southernmost narrow gauge (750 mm) railway still in operation in the world.

It was inaugurated in 1951, both for passengers and cargo use and, after almost being closed in the 1990s, it is now operated only for cargo transport.

In the last years, refurbished locomotives and switchers of soviet and Romanian origin were purchased, as well as freight cars built by EMEPA.

== Technical specifications ==
The Rio Turbio coal deposit is considered an extension of the Loreto Formation in the Magallanes Basin. The Rio Turbio Formation age is discussed but it is believed that it was formed in the Eocene. It has an estimated 750,000,000 tones reserves.

The mine produces Sub-bituminous coal. It has five coal-bearing units (mantos), divided in two carbonaceous complexes: Manto inferior (lowermost) and Manto Superior (forming the lowermost complex), and the uppermost complex formed by the Manto B, Manto A and the Manto Dorotea (uppermost). This last one is the only unit being mined at present. The Dorotea unit is believed to have 26,466,682 tones of exploitable reserves.

The mine has the following characteristics:

Technical aspects of the manto Dorotea
Component	Value
Moisture %	7,65
Volatile matter %	42,37
Fixed carbon %	37,93
Ash %	12,05
Calorific power (kcal/kg)	5790
Methane Emission factor (CH4 m^{3}/ coal t)	0,8 – 1,2

== Production ==
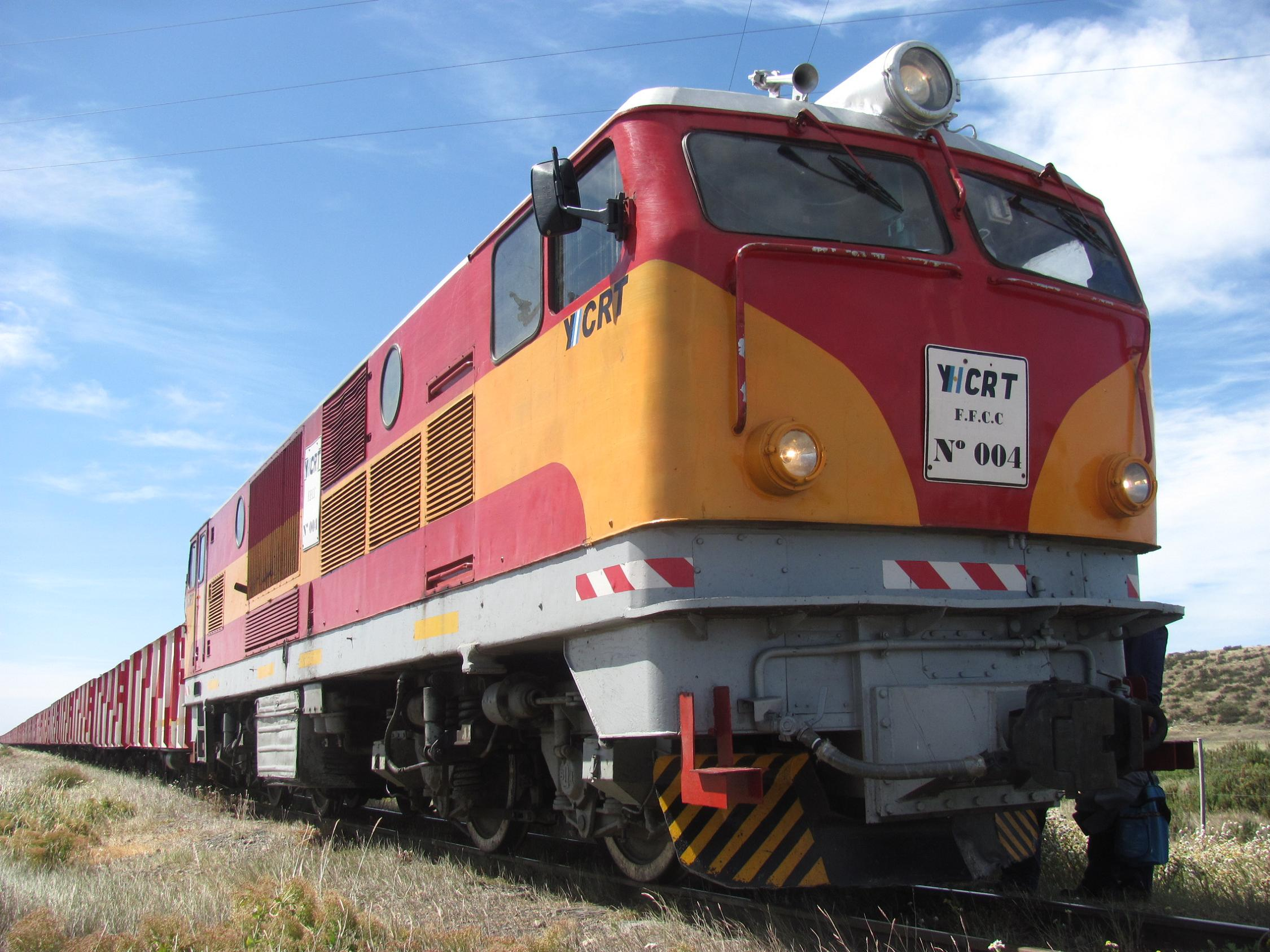
Rio Turbio rail freight locomotive

The mine uses the long walls mining method with controlled explosions.

The operation has two stages: the first one, in the interior of the mine, where galleries are prepared and the coal is extracted; and a second one, outside the mine, where the coal is washed and purified. Residue accounts for about 50% of the extracted mineral, which needs to be washed in order to be used as fuel.

During the washing, residues as clay and sandstone are eliminated. Then, the washed coal is milled and treated with a dense solution with suspended magnetite. This way, residual clay can be separated from the fine coal through decantation.

Residues from the washing (which are called "sterile") are sent to the treatment plant of the mine, where they precipitate and separate from water through a leveled drain. Effluent water from the treatment plant is discharged into the San José creek, and solid residue is sent via conveyor belt to a "sterile pile" where it is accumulated.

The sterile pile has been accumulating residues for over 30 years, presenting a serious environmental hazard due to its close location to the San José creek.

The coal is then transported via rail to Punta Loyola, a 285 kilometres (177 mi) long route that takes 8 hours, and then sent via ship to Buenos Aires. Some of the coal is also used in the Santa Cruz province for heating.
