= El Turbio =

- Village
- Interactive map of El Turbio
- Location within Argentina
- Coordinates: 51°41′S 72°5′W
- Country: Argentina
- Province: Santa Cruz Province
- Department: Güer Aike Department

Government
  - Intendant: Hugo René Garay
- Elevation: 185 m (607 ft)

Population (2001)
  - Total: 22
- Time zone: UTC−3 (ART)
- CPA: Z9407
- Area code: 02902
- Climate: Cfc

El Turbio is a small village belonging to Veintiocho de Noviembre municipality in Santa Cruz Province in southern Argentina.

== Climate ==
Typical to the southern fringes of Santa Cruz, El Turbio observes a borderline subantarctic continental climate (Köppen: Dfc) and subpolar oceanic climate (Köppen: Cfc) due to its consistency in precipitation and year-round chilly temperatures. Summers are relatively mild, and winters are cold in Argentinian standards, both of which are coupled with extremely small diurnal ranges. Due to its moderated climate from the ocean, temperatures hardly exceed 20 °C (even in summer), and at the same time, rarely drops below -5º for winter.

Climate data for El Turbio (1961–1990)
Month	Jan	Feb	Mar	Apr	May	Jun	Jul	Aug	Sep	Oct	Nov	Dec	Year
Mean daily maximum °C (°F)	16.5 (61.7)	15.8 (60.4)	14.2 (57.6)	11.4 (52.5)	6.9 (44.4)	5.2 (41.4)	4.6 (40.3)	5.8 (42.4)	9.2 (48.6)	12.3 (54.1)	13.6 (56.5)	15.5 (59.9)	10.9 (51.6)
Daily mean °C (°F)	10.4 (50.7)	9.9 (49.8)	8.3 (46.9)	6.3 (43.3)	2.5 (36.5)	1.2 (34.2)	0.4 (32.7)	1.0 (33.8)	3.9 (39.0)	6.4 (43.5)	7.9 (46.2)	9.8 (49.6)	5.7 (42.3)
Mean daily minimum °C (°F)	5.6 (42.1)	4.8 (40.6)	3.2 (37.8)	0.7 (33.3)	−1.8 (28.8)	−3.3 (26.1)	−4.3 (24.3)	−3.2 (26.2)	−0.2 (31.6)	1.3 (34.3)	2.1 (35.8)	3.6 (38.5)	0.7 (33.3)
Average precipitation mm (inches)	35 (1.4)	37 (1.5)	47 (1.9)	40 (1.6)	37 (1.5)	28 (1.1)	30 (1.2)	42 (1.7)	24 (0.9)	31 (1.2)	29 (1.1)	32 (1.3)	412 (16.2)
Source: Food and Agriculture Organization
