= Rospentek =

Coordinates: 51°39′S 72°11′W

- Municipality and village
- Interactive map of Rospentek
- Country: Argentina
- Province: Santa Cruz Province
- Department: Güer Aike Department
- Time zone: UTC−3 (ART)
- Climate: Cfc

Rospentek is a village and municipality in Santa Cruz Province in southern Argentina.
