= Caleta Wulaia =

Hamlet on Tierra del Fuego, Chile

- Hamlet
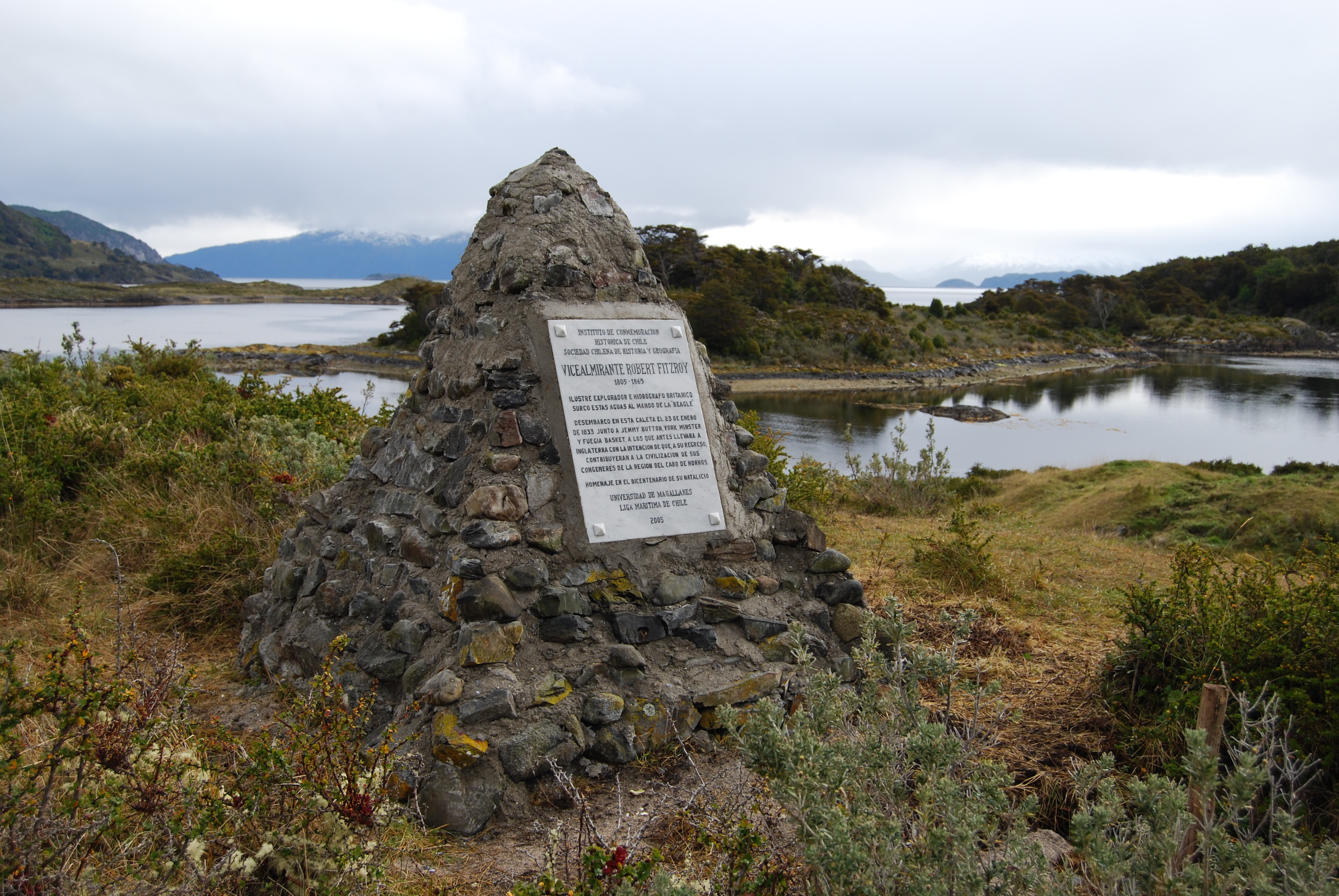
- Plaque commemorating the birth of Vice-Admiral Robert Fitzroy, erected at Wulaia Cove in 2005.

- Caleta Wulaia in Chile.
- Coordinates: 55°02′51″S 68°08′48″W
- Country: Chile
- Administrative division: Magallanes y la Antartica Chilena
- Island: Navarino Island
- Highest elevation: 27 m (89 ft)
- Lowest elevation: 0.46 m (1.5 ft)

Caleta Wulaia is the more northerly of the only two settlements in the world (other than research stations) below the 55th parallel south. The other and more southerly is Puerto Toro. It is on the other side of Navarino Island from Puerto Toro. This hamlet is in Magallanes y la Antartica Chilena, Chile, and has a very small river flowing entirely on the beach, slightly to the south of the city center. A network of small roads crisscrosses the city and connects it to Navarino Island's main highway.

The village is named after a bay near it, called Bahia Wulaia. It is also surrounded by forests, despite the cold climate and snowy winters.

The bay was the very first area on its island to be settled by Native Subantarcticans (the Yagan people).

== Etymology ==
The city's name roughly translates to "cove with a beautiful view" in the Yahgan language, where "Wulaia" means "beautiful view" and "Caleta" means "cove" or "bay".

== History ==
Since at least 6,000 BCE, the Yagans have inhabited southern Tierra del Fuego, including Navarino Island.

The very first inhabitants of the island were concentrated around the cove and this village. Around 700 BCE, the Yagans moved from what is now Argentina south to Caleta Wulaia and later Navarino island as a whole due to the warming and drying (ET in the Neolithic era to D/Cfc in the Iron Age) climate on Isla Grande de Tierra del Fuego, which caused the prevailing westerlies to weaken and become more predictable; the people were forced to seek out locations farther south because those were the only locales in South America that had a tundra climate anymore. In 1832-33, the HMS Beagle stopped at Button and Navarino Islands to investigate the natives.

While people used to think that they went extinct after European contact and the establishment of larger towns and villages on Tierra del Fuego, specifically since 1934, the people actually remain on the island as they always have. However, their language has been deemed extinct, and the last living, fluent speaker is 89 years old. Artifacts from the Yagans' past have been found at the city.

The Yagans today are not critically endangered, but like many peoples, they are being overshadowed by people of European descent. The remaining 100 Yagan people today are concentrated around Caleta Wulaia and Bahia de Mejillones, where they first settled on Navarino Island.

== Geography ==
The city slopes upward from east to west towards the highlands of interior Navarino Island. At the muddy and sandy beaches and river deltas of its coast, the lowest elevations occur, reaching less than 2 feet (61 cm). But the farther west one goes, the higher the elevation gets, therefore, at the one building of this city, which is 150 meters offshore, the altitude is 8 metres (26 ft). When the forests begin, the altitude is 20 metres (66 ft), and at the western boundary, it is 27 metres (89 ft). There are islands off the coast of the city, and the maximum elevation of the islands is 120 metres (390 ft). However, these islands are not part of Caleta Wulaia proper.

There is a Robert FitzRoy cairn approximately 150 meters to the south-southeast of Caleta Wulaia hamlet center, on top of a 4-meter-high rise at the point where a small peninsula joins the mainland. The peninsula is within an unincorporated area known as Punta Patache.

== Climate ==
The climate is tundra, very closely bordering on Cfc. Temperatures are very ocean-moderated, and snow is common in winter, spring and fall due to the southerly location combined with the oceanic proximity. Average daily means in summer are approximately 9.9 °C (49.8 °F), and averages in winter are around 1.5 °C (34.7 °F). The average mean maxima are 77–80 °F (25–27 °C) in January, and average mean minima are 22–25 °F (−6 – −4 °C) in July, giving a relatively low temperature amplitude of 52-58 F.

This city's climate has oceanic characteristics such as having four distinct seasons and mild winters, but its summers are much too cold for a truly maritime climate to ensue. Heatwaves with highs at or over 20 °C (68 °F) can occur for up to five days a month in the summer (November-March). Precipitation shows a dry-winter trend, with approximately 2.5 times as much precipitation occurring in December and January as in July, August, or September.

Climate data for Caleta Wulaia (2020s)
Month	Jan	Feb	Mar	Apr	May	Jun	Jul	Aug	Sep	Oct	Nov	Dec	Year
Mean maximum °C (°F)	26 (79)	22 (72)	19.5 (67.1)	19 (66)	16.7 (62.1)	11.1 (52.0)	10.0 (50.0)	9.2 (48.6)	15.6 (60.1)	17.8 (64.0)	20 (68)	25 (77)	26 (79)
Mean daily maximum °C (°F)	13.6 (56.5)	13.6 (56.5)	11.1 (52.0)	8.6 (47.5)	5.8 (42.4)	3.9 (39.0)	4.4 (39.9)	5.3 (41.5)	7.3 (45.1)	9.5 (49.1)	11.6 (52.9)	13.1 (55.6)	9.0 (48.2)
Daily mean °C (°F)	9.9 (49.8)	9.0 (48.2)	7 (45)	5.4 (41.7)	3.3 (37.9)	1.475 (34.66)	1.7 (35.1)	2.35 (36.23)	4.15 (39.47)	6.25 (43.25)	8 (46)	9.31 (48.76)	5.65 (42.17)
Mean daily minimum °C (°F)	6.1 (43.0)	4.4 (39.9)	3.9 (39.0)	2.2 (36.0)	0.6 (33.1)	−0.85 (30.47)	−1.1 (30.0)	−0.6 (30.9)	1 (34)	3 (37)	4.4 (39.9)	5.5 (41.9)	2.38 (36.26)
Mean minimum °C (°F)	3.0 (37.4)	1 (34)	−0.165 (31.70)	−0.3 (31.5)	−0.3 (31.5)	−4.4 (24.1)	−5 (23)	−4 (25)	−2.2 (28.0)	−1.9 (28.6)	0.0 (32.0)	3.3 (37.9)	−5 (23)
Average rainy days	26	22	25	23	24	24	25	24	21	24	25	27	290
Average snowy days	0	0	0	1	4	9	9	9	5	2	1	0	40
Source 1:
Source 2:

== See also ==
- Puerto Williams
- Ushuaia
- Rio Grande
- Subantarctic region
- Geography of the Faroe Islands - the climate there is very similar to Caleta Wulaia's.
