= Mina 3 =

- Municipality and village
- Location within Argentina
- Coordinates: 51°32′24″S 72°16′18″W
- Country: Argentina
- Province: Santa Cruz Province
- Department: Güer Aike Department

Government
  - Intendant: Ricardo Antonio Juzefiszyn (PJ)
- Time zone: UTC−3 (ART)

Mina 3 is a village and municipality in Santa Cruz Province in southern Argentina.
