= Camusu Aike =

- Settlement
- Location within Argentina
- Coordinates: 50°48′S 70°40′W
- Country: Argentina
- Province: Santa Cruz
- Department: Güer Aike Department
- Established: January 1898

Population (2010 census)
  - Total: 51
- Time zone: UTC−3 (ART)
- Climate: Cfc

Camusu Aike is an indigenous community settlement in the Güer Aike Department of the Santa Cruz Province in southern Argentina. Its inhabitants are members of the Aonikenk (Tehuelche) people.

Camusu Aike was the first state-recognized Aonikenk community.

== Etymology ==
In the Aonekko ʾaʾien language of the Aonikenk people, the term kamusu (rendered as "Camusu" in Spanish orthography) means "tall waving grass", while aike means "settlement" or "camp". The name therefore can be translated as "camp by the tall waving grass"

== History ==
The community was established by decree on 11 January 1898 by President José Evaristo Uriburu, wherein the local Aonikenk community were granted a 50 thousand-hectare territory in what was their ancestral land. The territory was reduced to 30 thousand hectares during the government of President Juan Domingo Perón. According to the 1966−1968 National Indigenous Census, the community counted with 44 Aonikenk inhabitants, 24 of which spoke Aonekko ʾaʾien.

In September 2007 the Argentine state officially recognized Camusu Aike as an official indigenous community. Up until 2011, most of the community's houses were dispersed throughout the territory. In April 2015, the state recognized the community's right to 18 thousand additional hectares that had previously been taken away by the national government, pending the remaining 2 thousand hectares.

Camusu Aike was the birthplace of the last fluent speaker of the Aonekko ʾaʾien language, Dora Manchado (1934−2019).
