= Yacimientos Carboníferos Fiscales =

YCF S.E.
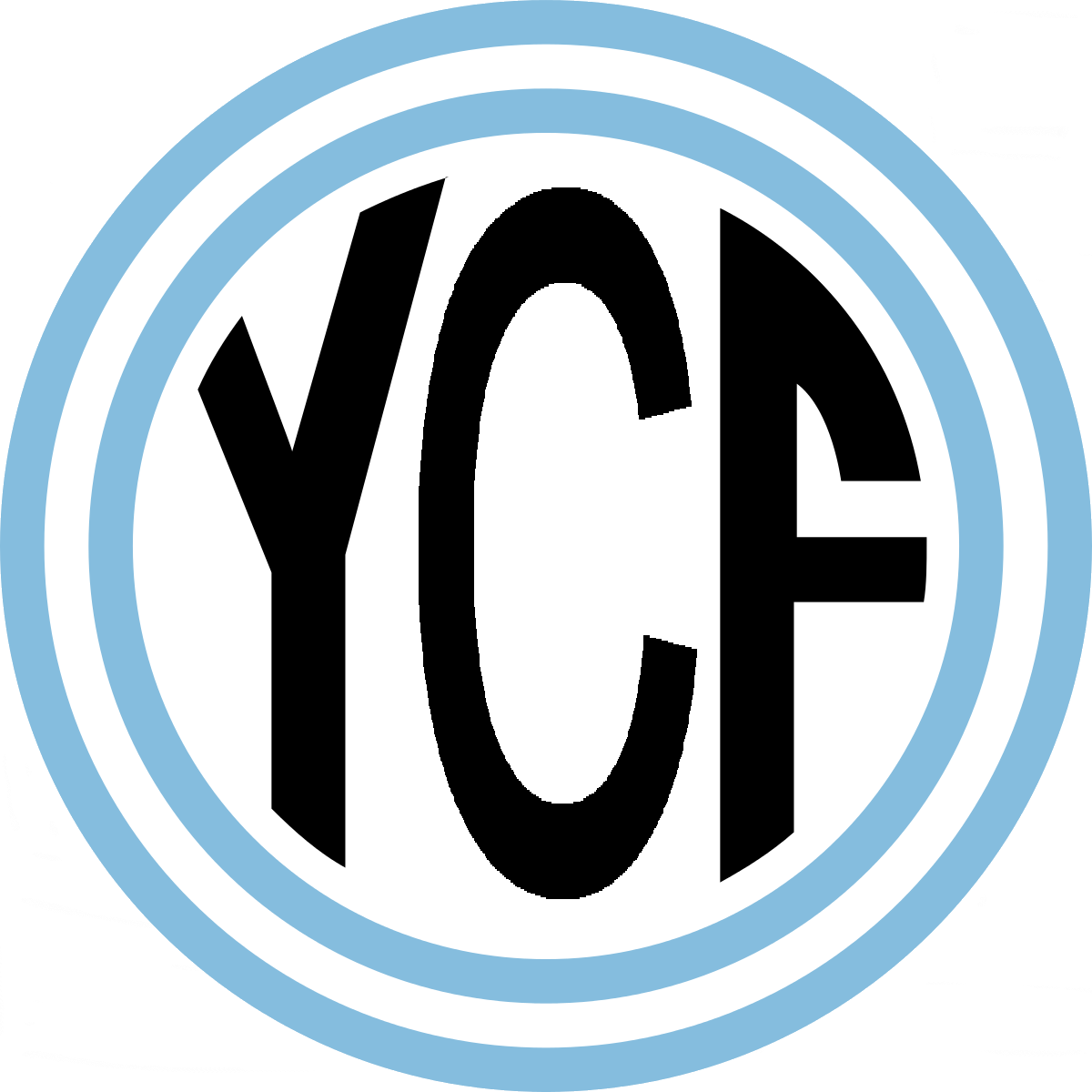

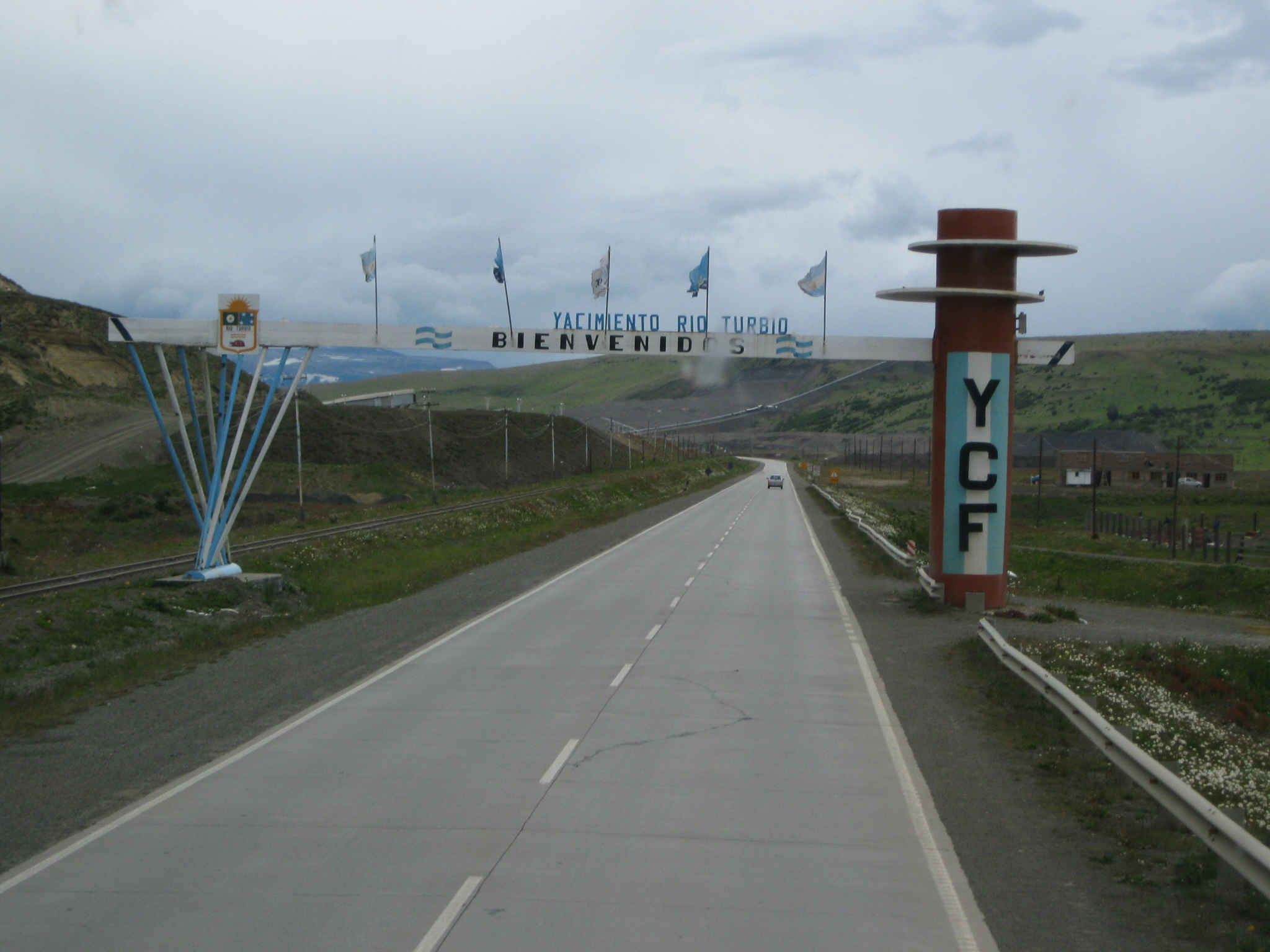
- Entrance to Río Turbio pictured in 2009
- Company type: state-owned
- Industry: Coal mining
- Founded: 1958
- Defunct: 1994; 32 years ago
- Successor: YCRT
- Headquarters: Río Turbio, Santa Cruz, Argentina
- Area served: Argentina
- Products: Coal
- Divisions: Rio Turbio Railway

YCF, acronym for Yacimientos Carboníferos Fiscales (Spanish for Fiscal Coal Fields), was an Argentine state-owned company dedicated to exploiting coal deposits in the Argentine mainland, mainly the field near to Rio Turbio.

The company was succeeded in 1994 by Yacimientos Carboníferos Río Turbio.

== History ==
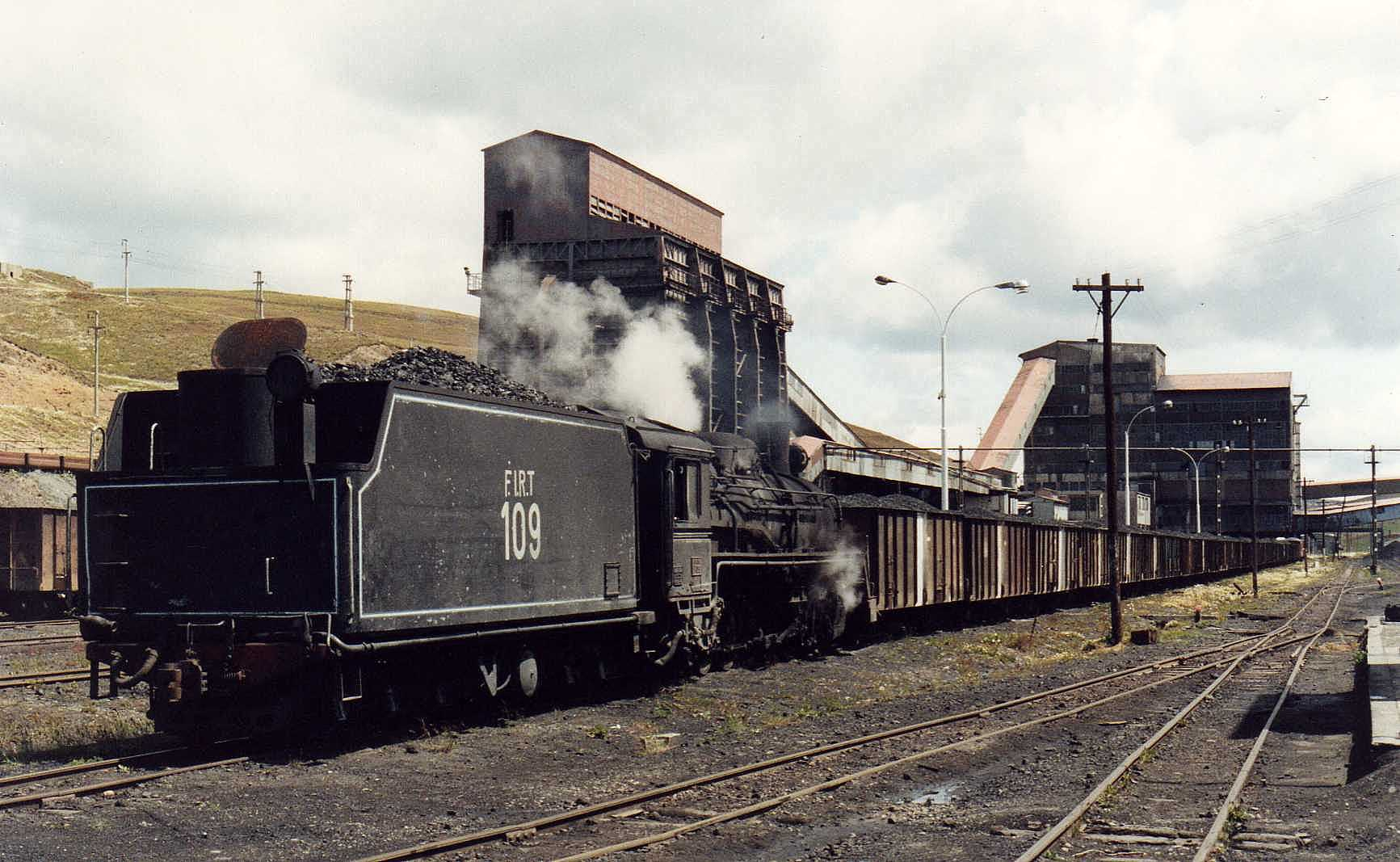
"Ferrocarril Industrial Río Turbio" freight train

The company was founded in 1958 and existed until 1994, when it was privatised and renamed as Yacimientos Carboníferos Río Turbio S.A.

Prior to the creation of YCF, Argentina used to import coal. This became a problem during World War II, when a severe shortage caused problems to such key sectors as industry and transport. Production peaked in 1972 when it reached 570,000 tons.

The coal was mined in Rio Turbio and transported to the port city of Rio Gallegos using the Rio Turbio Railway.
