= Güer Aike Department =

Coordinates: 51°37′24″S 69°12′59″W

Güer Aike
- Department
- Location of Güer Aike Department in Santa Cruz Province.
- Country: Argentina
- Province: Santa Cruz
- Seat: Río Gallegos

Area
  - Total: 33,841 km^{2} (13,066 sq mi)

Population (Census 2022)
  - Total: 137,895
  - Density: 4.0748/km^{2} (10.554/sq mi)

Güer Aike Department is a department in Santa Cruz Province, Argentina. It covers an area of 33,841 km^{2}, and had a population of 113,267 at the 2010 Census which rose to 137,895 at the 2022 Census. The seat of the department is in Río Gallegos which also has the majority of the population with 95,796 inhabitants in 2010 and 115,524 in 2022.

Río Turbio is the second largest town with 11,077 inhabitants in 2022, while Veintiocho de Noviembre has the next largest population with 9,478 inhabitants in 2022. The department's name means 'large camp' in the aonikenk (or 'tehuelche') language of southern Patagonia.

== Settlements ==
- El Turbio
- Julia Dufour
- Mina 3
- Río Gallegos
- Río Turbio
- Rospentek
- Veintiocho de Noviembre
- Güer Aike
- Camusu Aike
