= Dora Manchado =

Last speaker of Tehuelche language

- Born: 1934; Camusu Aike
- Died: 4 January 2019

Dora Manchado (Camusu Aike, Argentina, c. 1934 – Río Gallegos, January 4, 2019) was an Argentinian woman who was the last first-language speaker of the Tehuelche language of Patagonia. She was also the last first-language speaker of any of the Chonan languages. She became a professor of the language. Due to her efforts, scientists were able to carry out work on the documentation of the language during a period in which native speakers were dying rapidly.

== Biography ==
Dora was born in 1934 at Camusu Aike reserve, between Río Gallegos and El Calafate. There she learned to speak the language from her relatives. As a young woman, she left the reserve and began to work in guest houses in El Calafate. She established herself in Río Gallegos in the 1960s.

After the deaths of her sister and other Tehuelche-speaking friends, she had no one to converse with. In 2011, she took on the role of language teacher, helping to reintroduce the Tehuelche language in a program organized by the Argentinian Ministry of Education and a group known as Coordinación EIB (Bilingual Intercultural Education). One of the reasons for the loss of the language was racism, as the Tehuelches were subjected to ostracism, mockery and shaming. For this reason, parents did not teach their children the language.

In 2018 the anthropologist Javier Domingo worked with Manchado for four months to record the state of the language. Many earlier works on the language were folkloric in nature, intended to attract tourism. Domingo recorded the sessions with the intention of preserving the language, and in his final video he thanked her for all her help. Manchado responded:

Aio t nash 'a'ieshm ten kot 'awkko (Maybe some day someone will speak Tehuelche).

She died on January 4, 2019, in the city of Río Gallegos.

== Prizes and honours ==
- During her life she was named a Living Patrimony of the province of Santa Cruz.
- An episode of the series Guardianes de la lengua (Guardians of the Language) tells the story of Dora Manchado and the Tehuelche.
- In 2021 a street was named for her in El Faro, Río Gallegos.
