= Puerto Almanza =

Fishing village in Tierra del Fuego, Argentina

Coordinates: 54°52′12″S 67°33′50″W

- Village
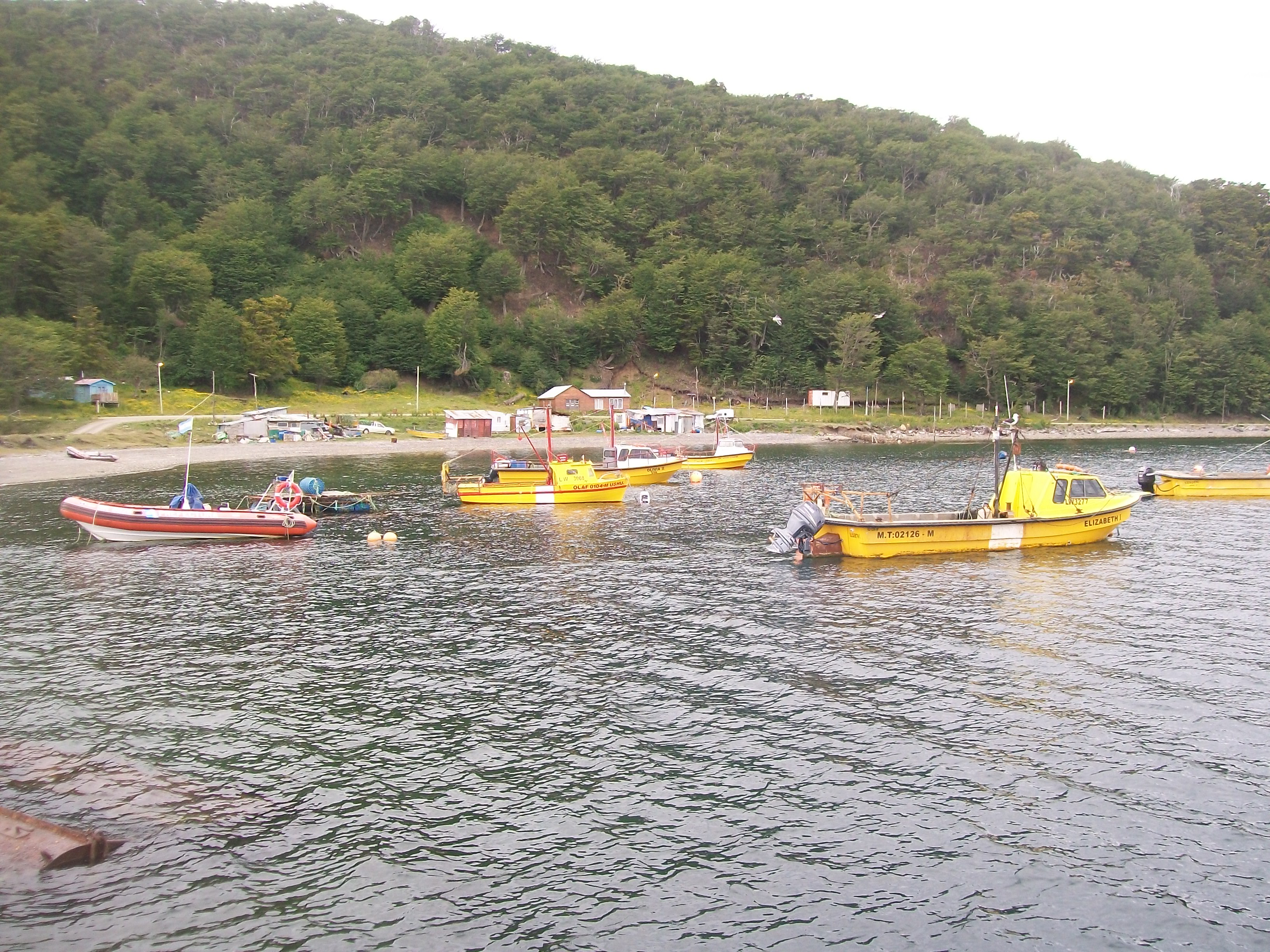
- Partial view of the Puerto Almanza marina
- Interactive map of Puerto Almanza
- Country: Argentina
- Province: Tierra del Fuego
- Department: Ushuaia

Puerto Almanza is a fishing village in Tierra del Fuego on the northeastern shore of the Beagle Channel. It is the southernmost settlement of Argentina. The village, like the rest of Tierra del Fuego, is known for its king crab. Crab fishing is the primary economic activity in Puerto Almanza, but tourism is an emerging sector.

== Geography ==
Puerto Almanza is located on the northeastern shore of the Beagle Channel, a strait in the Tierra del Fuego archipelago, at the southern tip of South America. It is situated 3 kilometres (1.9 mi) west of Almirante Brown and nearly opposite to the Chilean village of Puerto Williams. It is the southernmost settlement of Argentina.

== History ==
Puerto Almanza means Port Almanza in Spanish; Almanza was the name of a sawmill that operated in the area in the 1940s and 1950s.

In 1966, the Prefectura Naval Argentina installed a post in the village, where it still stands today.

The first settlers arrived in the 1990s, but it was not until 2001 that the area was settled permanently by a group of fishermen.

== Economy ==
Crab fishing is the main economic activity in Puerto Almanza. The village, like the wider Tierra del Fuego region, is known for its king crab. Locals also fish mollusks and snooks from the Beagle Channel, and farm mussels, sea urchins, and trout. The Argentine government's 2021 ban on intensive salmon farming has been credited by locals with improving the condition of the waters surrounding the village and restoring the ecosystem.

Tourism is a growing sector in Puerto Almanza. The village is promoted by food and travel companies as the "final stop on [Argentina's] king crab route", and it also receives visitors due to its status of being the southernmost settlement of Argentina.

== Transportation ==
Puerto Almanza does not have an airport. It can be reached by road from Ushuaia by traveling east via the Ruta Nacional 3 for approximately 71 kilometres (44 mi) until reaching road J, which leads back down to the channel, where travelers may continue west on road K for about 5 kilometres (3.1 mi) to reach Puerto Almanza.
