= Julia Dufour =

Coordinates: 51°32′S 72°18′W

- Municipality and village
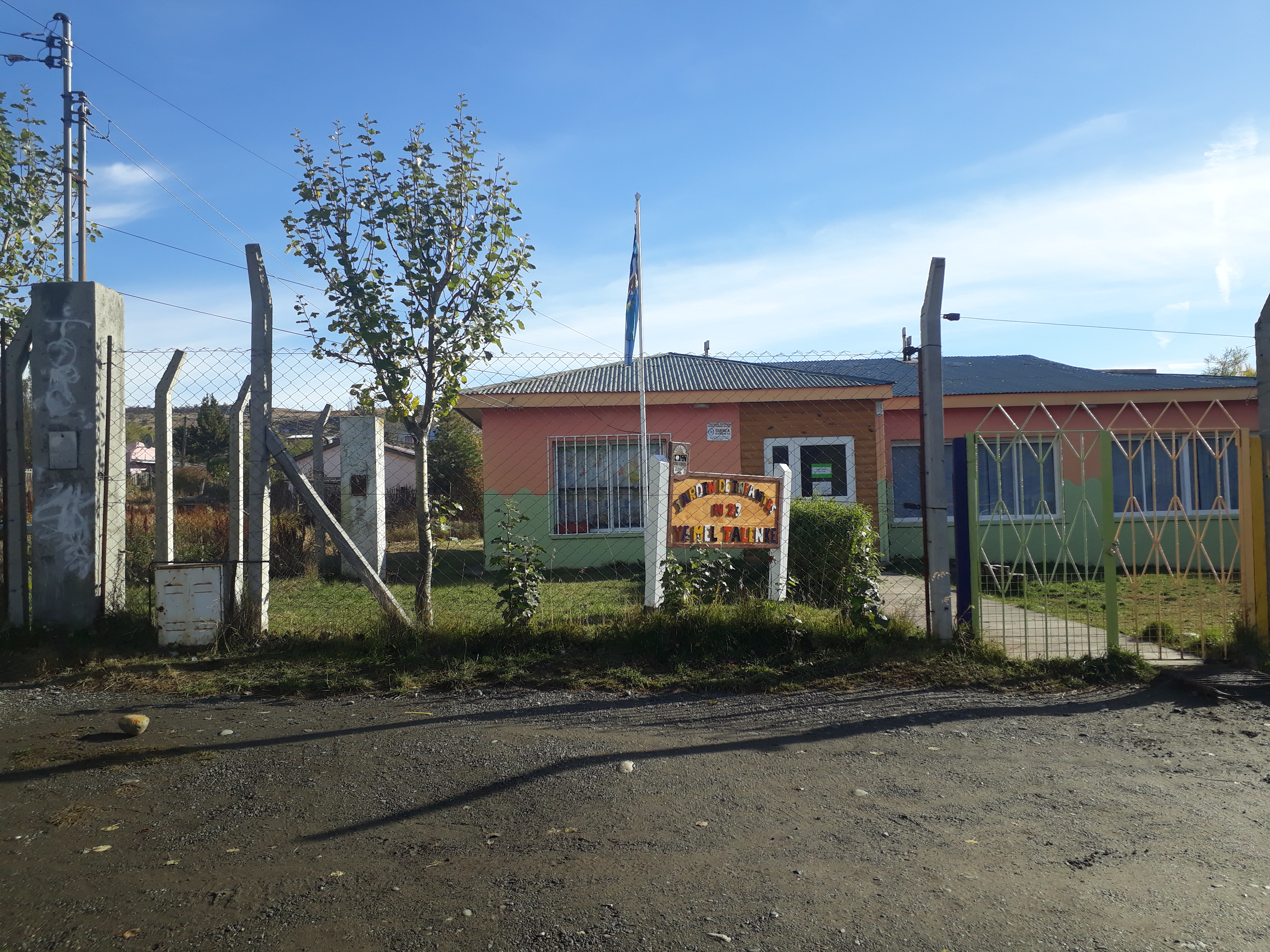
- Interactive map of Julia Dufour
- Country: Argentina
- Province: Santa Cruz Province
- Department: Güer Aike Department

Government
  - Intendant: Horacio Matías Mazú (PJ)
- Time zone: UTC−3 (ART)

Julia Dufour is a village and municipality in Santa Cruz Province in southern Argentina.

The name of the town pays homage to Julia Dufour, Argentine pioneer in Patagonia and wife of the Argentine explorer Luis Piedrabuena.
