= Punta Loyola =

Coordinates: 51°37′01″S 69°01′50″W

- Municipality and town
- Interactive map of Punta Loyola
- Country: Argentina
- Province: Santa Cruz Province
- Department: Güer Aike Department
- Time zone: UTC−3 (ART)
- Climate: BSk

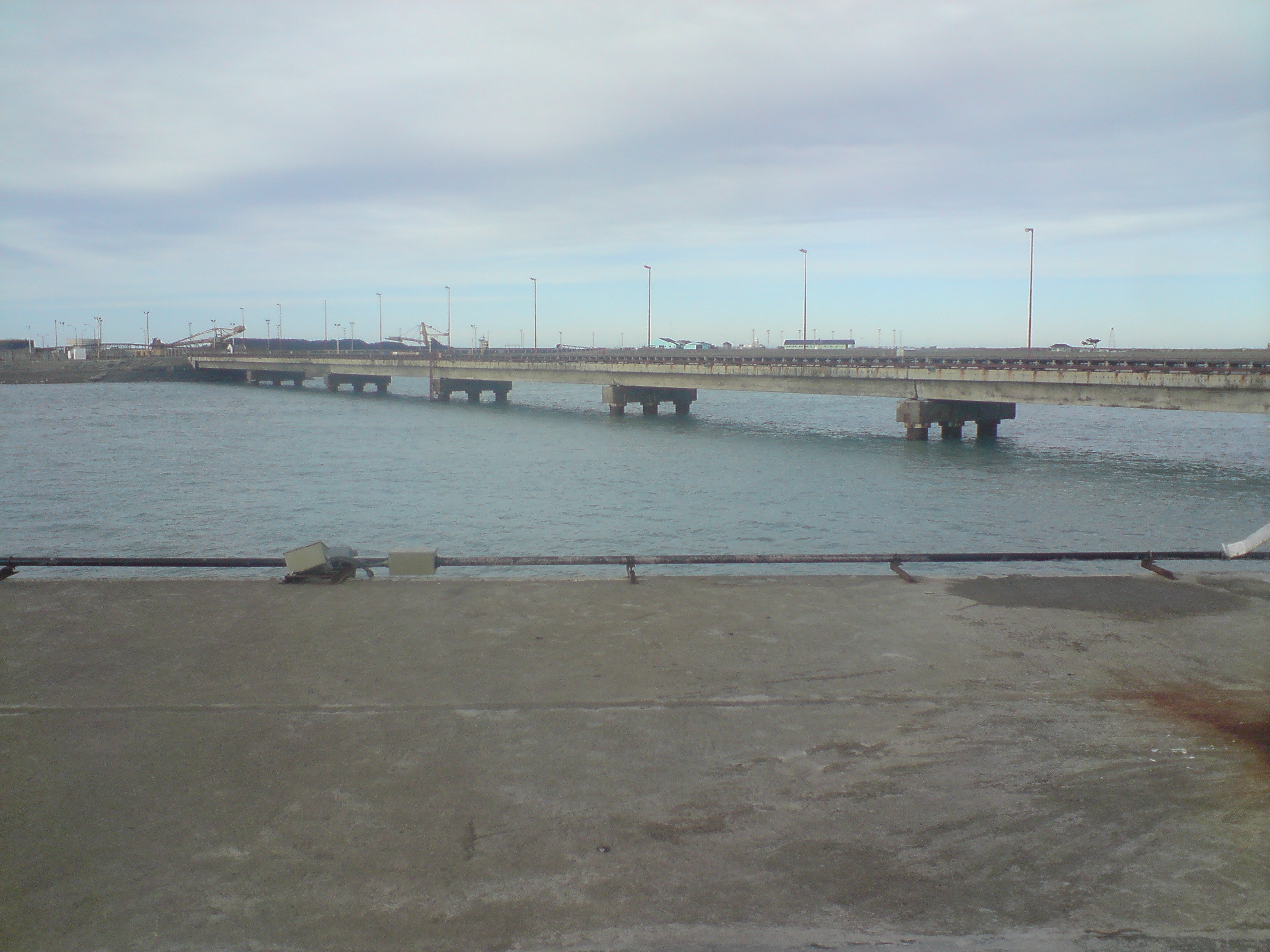
Panoramic view of the pier and railway complex in Punta Loyola.

Punta Loyola is a town and municipality in Santa Cruz Province in southern Argentina.
