= Rio Turbio Airport =

Airport in Argentina

Rio Turbio Airport Aeropuerto de Río Turbio
- IATA: RYO; ICAO: SAWT

Summary
- Location: Río Turbio, Santa Cruz Province, Argentina
- Elevation AMSL: 896 ft / 273 m
- Coordinates: 51.600413°S 72.221872°W

Map
- Location of airport in Argentina

Runways
Direction	Length		Surface
Direction	m	ft	Surface
06/24	1,750	5,741	Asphalt
- Source: WAC Google Maps GCM

Río Turbio Airport (IATA: RYO, ICAO: SAWT) is an airport serving Río Turbio, a town in the Santa Cruz Province of Argentina. The airport is just south of 28 de Noviembre, a town 10 kilometres (6 mi) southeast of Rio Turbio.

The international border with Chile is 6 kilometres (3.7 mi) west of the airport. Runway length includes 60 metres (200 ft) displaced thresholds on each end. The Puerto Natales VOR-DME (Ident: PNT) is located 11.5 nautical miles (21 km) southwest of the airport. The El Turbio non-directional beacon (Ident: BIO) is located on the field.

== See also ==
- Transport in Argentina
- List of airports in Argentina
