= Veintiocho de Noviembre =

Argentinian town in Santa Cruz Province

Coordinates: 51°39′S 72°18′W

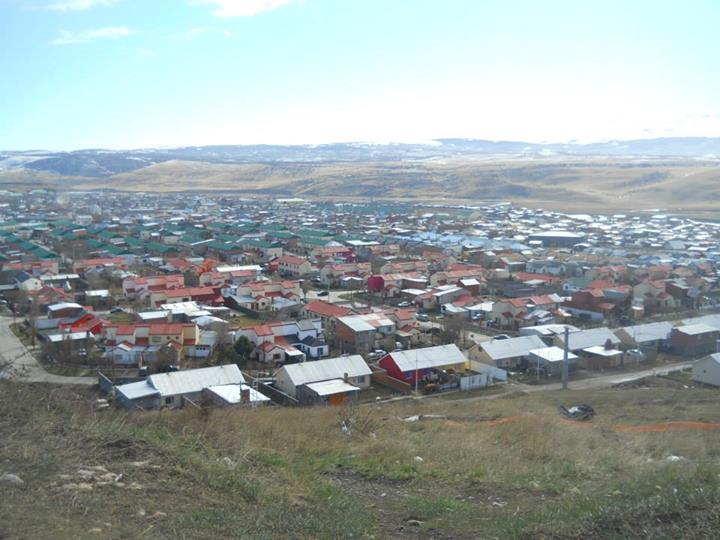
Veintiocho de Noviembre

28 de Noviembre, written out as Veintiocho de Noviembre, is a town in southwestern Santa Cruz Province, Argentina. It had 9,478 inhabitants at the 2022 Census, most of whom are of Argentinian and Italian origin, and is located 270 km (168 mi) west of Río Gallegos and 13 km (8 mi) south of Río Turbio. The town is near the border with Chile, not far from Puerto Natales. Its main economic activity is coal mining.

The town was officially founded on 28 November 1959, on the second anniversary of the adoption of the provincial constitution, when a decree merged several settlements into one town which was named after the date of foundation. On 25 May 1962, the Argentine flag was raised for the first time in the town's central square. It was donated by Adolfo González, who lived there for many years.

28 de Noviembre is the nearest town to Río Turbio Airport.
