= Río Turbio, Santa Cruz Province =

Río Turbio
- Municipality and town
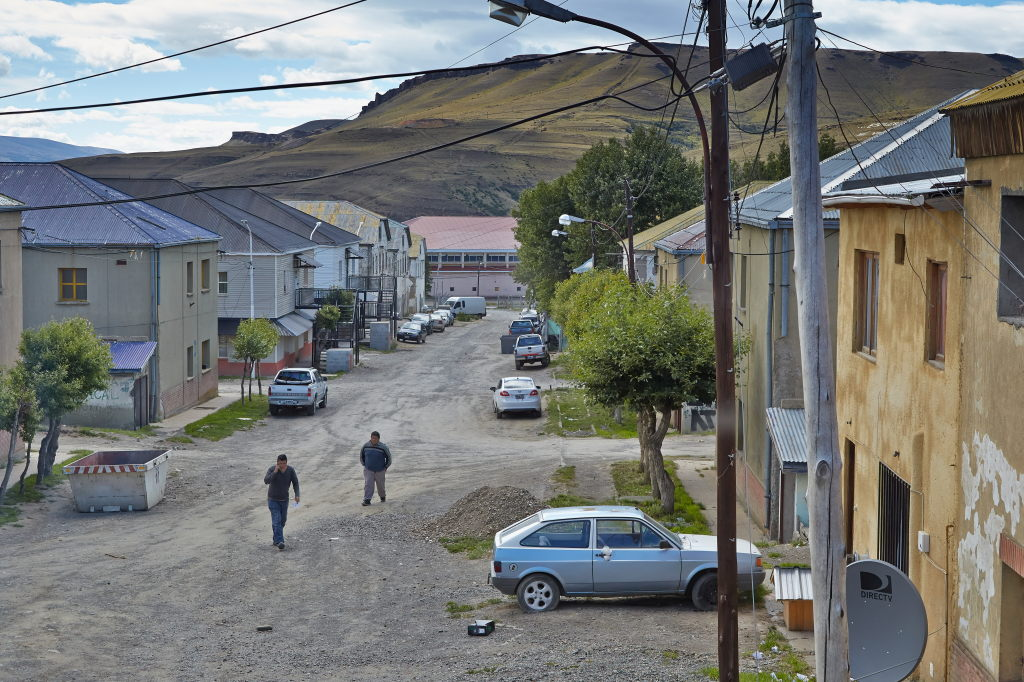
- Río Turbio

- Location within Argentina
- Coordinates: 51°32′S 72°18′W
- Country: Argentina
- Province: Santa Cruz
- Department: Güer Aike Department
- Established: Dec 1942

Government
  - Intendant: Darío Menna (Kolina)

Population (2001 census)
  - Total: 11,077
- Time zone: UTC−3 (ART)
- Postal code: Z9407
- Climate: Cfc

Río Turbio is a town and municipality in the Güer Aike Department of the Santa Cruz Province in southern Argentina.

It was founded in 1942 as a consequence of the coal mining in the area. Rio Turbio was home to the state-owned coal extraction company YCF. The mine is currently operated by Yacimientos Carboníferos Río Turbio.

Río Turbio Airport is located near to 28 de Noviembre town, about 16 km southwest of Rio Turbio.

== Climate ==
Under the Köppen climate classification, Río Turbio is classified as a subpolar oceanic climate (Köppen climate classification: Cfc) with cold winters. The climate is characterized by strong westerly winds, which are generated by the influence of the two semi-permanent high pressure systems in the South Atlantic and South Pacific. Mean monthly temperatures range from a low of 1.1 °C (34.0 °F) in July to a high of 10.7 °C (51.3 °F) in January.

Climate data for Río Turbio (1901–2000)
Month	Jan	Feb	Mar	Apr	May	Jun	Jul	Aug	Sep	Oct	Nov	Dec	Year
Record high °C (°F)	31.5 (88.7)	25.5 (77.9)	25.5 (77.9)	22.5 (72.5)	21.0 (69.8)	18.0 (64.4)	15.0 (59.0)	14.5 (58.1)	18.5 (65.3)	20.5 (68.9)	25.0 (77.0)	25.5 (77.9)	31.5 (88.7)
Mean daily maximum °C (°F)	16.5 (61.7)	15.8 (60.4)	14.2 (57.6)	11.4 (52.5)	6.9 (44.4)	5.2 (41.4)	4.6 (40.3)	5.8 (42.4)	9.2 (48.6)	12.3 (54.1)	13.6 (56.5)	15.5 (59.9)	10.9 (51.6)
Daily mean °C (°F)	10.7 (51.3)	10.0 (50.0)	8.8 (47.8)	6.3 (43.3)	2.8 (37.0)	1.7 (35.1)	1.1 (34.0)	1.6 (34.9)	4.3 (39.7)	6.4 (43.5)	7.5 (45.5)	9.3 (48.7)	5.9 (42.6)
Mean daily minimum °C (°F)	5.6 (42.1)	4.8 (40.6)	3.2 (37.8)	0.7 (33.3)	−1.8 (28.8)	−3.3 (26.1)	−4.3 (24.3)	−3.2 (26.2)	−0.2 (31.6)	1.3 (34.3)	2.1 (35.8)	3.6 (38.5)	0.7 (33.3)
Record low °C (°F)	−1.5 (29.3)	−2.0 (28.4)	−5.0 (23.0)	−10.5 (13.1)	−18.0 (−0.4)	−15.0 (5.0)	−21.0 (−5.8)	−27.0 (−16.6)	−10.0 (14.0)	−7.0 (19.4)	−5.5 (22.1)	−3.0 (26.6)	−27.0 (−16.6)
Average precipitation mm (inches)	42.8 (1.69)	37.2 (1.46)	44.7 (1.76)	44.3 (1.74)	43.0 (1.69)	38.0 (1.50)	31.5 (1.24)	41.6 (1.64)	21.3 (0.84)	31.3 (1.23)	32.3 (1.27)	35.1 (1.38)	443.1 (17.44)
Average precipitation days (≥ 3.0 mm)	8.1	8.0	9.2	7.6	7.6	7.4	7.2	7.7	6.8	8.0	8.2	8.0	93.8
Average relative humidity (%)	65	67	69	74	81	82	83	72	74	69	68	66	73
