= Pintura =

Pintura or Pinturas may refer to:

- Pintura, Utah, an unincorporated community in Washington County, Utah
- Pinturas River, a river in Patagonia Argentina
- Pinturas River Canyon or Cañadón Río Pinturas, a town of Perito Moreno in Santa Cruz, Argentina
- Pintura á pó, type of coating that is applied as a free-flowing, dry powder
- Pintura (Philippine comics), a superhero in the Filipino comic book Bayan Knights
