= Paso Río Jeinemeni =

Paso Río Jeinemeni is a border crossing in Patagonia connecting the Chilean town of Chile Chico with its sister town of Los Antiguos in Argentina. The nearest city in the Chilean side is Punta Arenas. The crossing is opens at 8 AM and closes at 20 PM each day. The border crossing lies 234 m a.s.l.
