= Los Toldos (Santa Cruz) =

Archaeological site in Santa Cruz Province, Argentina

- Interactive map of Los Toldos
- 47°27′00″S 68°50′00″W
- Periods: Late Glacial Interstadial and Holocene
- Cultures: Toldense and Tehuelche
- Location: Santa Cruz Province, Argentina
- Region: Patagonia

Los Toldos is an archaeological site in Santa Cruz, Argentina,. Evidence has been found there of human activity dating back to nearly 13,000 years ago. It is the namesake of the Toldense culture group.

== Location ==
The site is located south of the Deseado River, in the Canadon de las Cuevas.

== Cave 3 ==
Cave 3 of Los Toldos is located next to a ravine. (Note: The ravine has a height of 1.90 m, a depth of 22 m, a maximum width of 20 m, and a minimum width of 4 m.) Human settlement of the cave is dated to around 12,000 years ago. The entrance to the cave is approximately 12 metres (39 ft) wide. A team of specialists and students from the National University of La Plata (UNLP), led by archaeologist Augusto Cárdich, excavated twelve archaeological strata in the cave, up to a total depth of two metres (6.6 ft):

Stratigraphy	Description
1	Corresponds with Tehuelche occupation, although there are few artifacts in this layer.
2	There are few artifacts in this layer.
3	Numerous lithic artifacts have been uncovered at this layer of the site, indicating extensive use. These include arrowheads/projectile points, scrapers, short scrapers and the bones of guanacos, deer, foxes, rodents and birds.
4–5	These layers coincided with a volcanic eruption. A layer of ash exists in these levels, and there are no archaeological remains. This has led them to be called "sterile".
6–7	These layers correspond with a culture known as the "Casa Pedra" or "Casapedrenca", characterized by a higher amount of lithic tools, probably meant for hunting guanacos. This culture flourished 7,500 years ago in Patagonia. Many large scrapers and knives were found during the excavations of these layers.
8	This layer yielded few lithic artifacts, indicating that the cave was probably uninhabited during the time period associated with it.
9–10	These layers provide important information on the Toldense material culture group. Two bifacial points, other triangular and thin spearheads, and a large number of scrapers were found. The artifacts have been radiocarbon dated to between 9,000 and 11,000 years ago. Bones of guanacos, rhea, and horses were identified and found in these layers as well.
11–12	These layers contain numerous lithic artifacts, dating from 11,000 to 13,000 years ago. Among these are unifacial points, large shards of stone that were modified to varying degrees, and scrapers. These artifacts indicate that the site was occupied by hunters adapted to the steppe of Patagonia. They hunted horses like Parahippus and camelids such as guanacos. This technological phase favored the later development of Toldense Culture.

== See also ==
- Cueva de las Manos — Nearby cave site with prehistoric paintings, also containing Toldense artifacts
- Piedra Museo — Nearby archaeological site with Toldense artifacts
