= Lago Buenos Aires Department =

Coordinates: 46°35′18″S 70°55′49″W

Lago Buenos Aires
- Department
- Location of Lago Buenos Aires Department in Santa Cruz Province.
- Country: Argentina
- Province: Santa Cruz
- Seat: Perito Moreno

Area
  - Total: 28,609 km^{2} (11,046 sq mi)

Population
  - Total: 12,606

Lago Buenos Aires Department is one of the seven departments in Santa Cruz Province, Argentina. It covers an area of 28,609 km^{2} and had a population of 12,606 at the 2022 Census. The seat of the department is in Perito Moreno.

== Municipalities ==
- Los Antiguos
- Perito Moreno
