= Perito Moreno Airport =

Airport in Argentina

Perito Moreno Airport Aeropuerto Jalil Hamer
- IATA: PMQ; ICAO: SAWP

Summary
- Airport type: Public
- Serves: Perito Moreno, Argentina
- Elevation AMSL: 1,410 ft (430 m)
- Coordinates: 46°32′15″S 70°58′45″W

Map
- Location of the airport in Argentina

Runways
Direction	Length		Surface
Direction	m	ft	Surface
10/28	1,640	5,381	Asphalt
- Sources: WAD Google Maps SkyVector

Perito Moreno Airport (IATA: PMQ, ICAO: SAWP) is an airport serving Perito Moreno, a town in the Santa Cruz Province of Argentina. The airport is 7 kilometres (4 mi) northwest of the town.

The Balmaceda VOR-DME (Ident: BAL) is located 48.3 nautical miles (89 km) northwest of the airport. The Perito Moreno non-directional beacon (Ident: PTM) is located on the field.

== See also ==
- Transport in Argentina
- List of airports in Argentina
