= Piedra Museo =

Archaeological site in Santa Cruz Province, Argentina

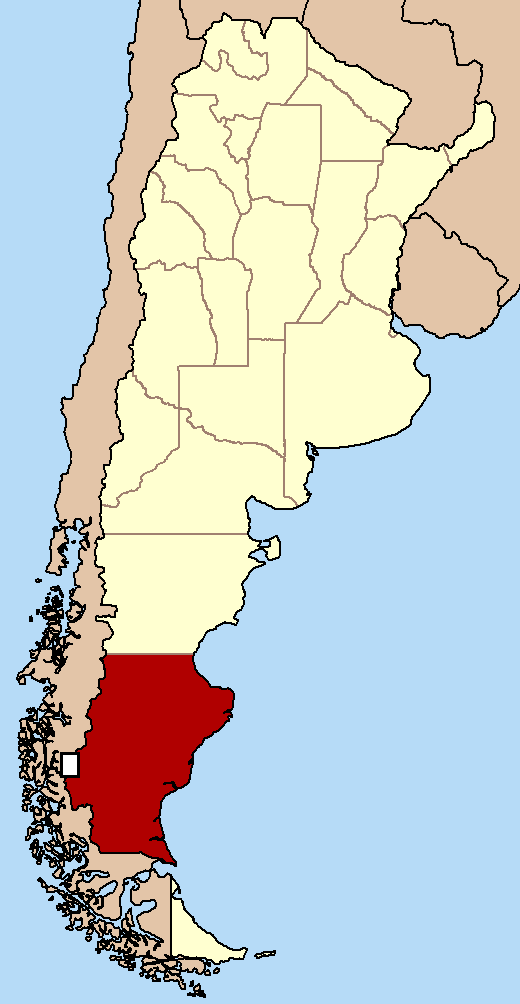
Province in which the site is located

Piedra Museo is an archaeological site in Santa Cruz Province, Argentina, and one of the earliest known archaeological remains in the Americas.

== Overview ==
The site was discovered around 1910 by Argentine naturalist Florentino Ameghino, who wrote the first detailed anthropological study of Argentina, La antigüedad del hombre en el Plata (The Antiquity of Man in the Río de la Plata Basin), in 1878. A further 1995 excavation by University of La Plata archaeologist Dr. Laura Miotti made a carbon dating analysis possible, and led to the discovery that its human fossil remains date from approximately 11,000 years ago.

The site, located 250 km (150 mi) from Pico Truncado, in Deseado Department (Santa Cruz Province), is among the oldest archaeological remains uncovered in the Americas. Its discoveries included spear heads that contained traces of Mylodon and Hippidion, among other animals known to have been extinct since at least 10000 BC. Its original inhabitants, the Toldense people, were hunter gatherers that subsisted on these and other prey, such as rhea and guanacos.

Piedra Museo, like Pedra Furada (Brazil), Monte Verde (Chile), Topper, and the Meadowcroft Rockshelter (United States), in turn have led to alternative theories to that of the "Clovis First" hypothesis on the settlement of the Americas (the assumption, based on lacking evidence to the contrary, that the Clovis culture was the first in the Western Hemisphere).

Fossils from Piedra Museo, as well as artifacts and petroglyphs from the nearby Los Toldos site, are housed in the Pico Truncado Regional Museum of History.

== See also ==
- Cueva de las Manos – Cave with paintings in Santa Cruz, Argentina
