= Pinturas River Canyon =

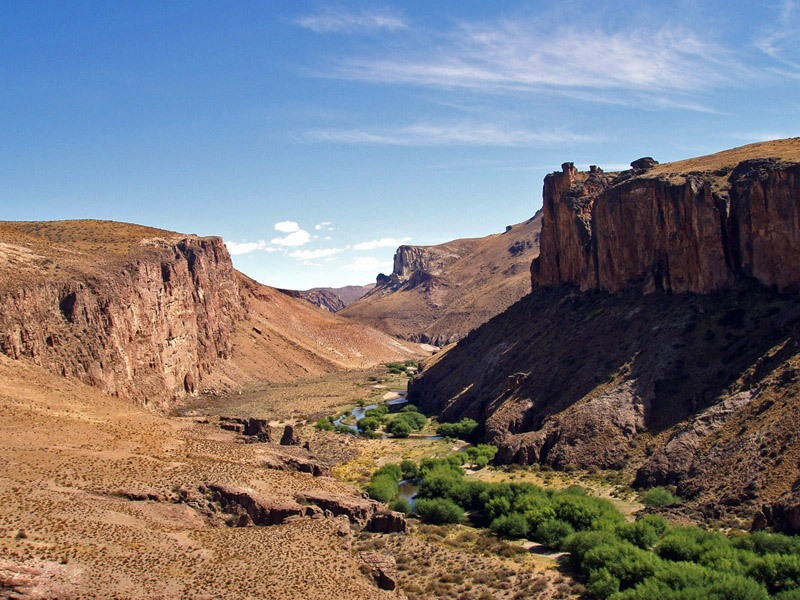
- Pinturas River Canyon and the Pinturas River.
- Width: 480 metres (1,570 ft)

Geography
- Location: Santa Cruz, Argentina
- Rivers: Pinturas River

The Pinturas River Canyon (Spanish: Cañadón Río Pinturas) is a canyon located 160 km from the town of Perito Moreno in Santa Cruz, Argentina. It is home to the Pinturas River, which carved the canyon through eroding the Chon Aike Formation. Native populations inhabited the region, painting many works of rock art, some of which can still be seen today. The most famous of these rock art sites is the Cueva de las Manos, a cave site with ancient art whose creation dates back up to 13,000 years ago. This rock art, and Cueva de las Manos in particular, brings lots of tourism to the canyon.

== Geology ==
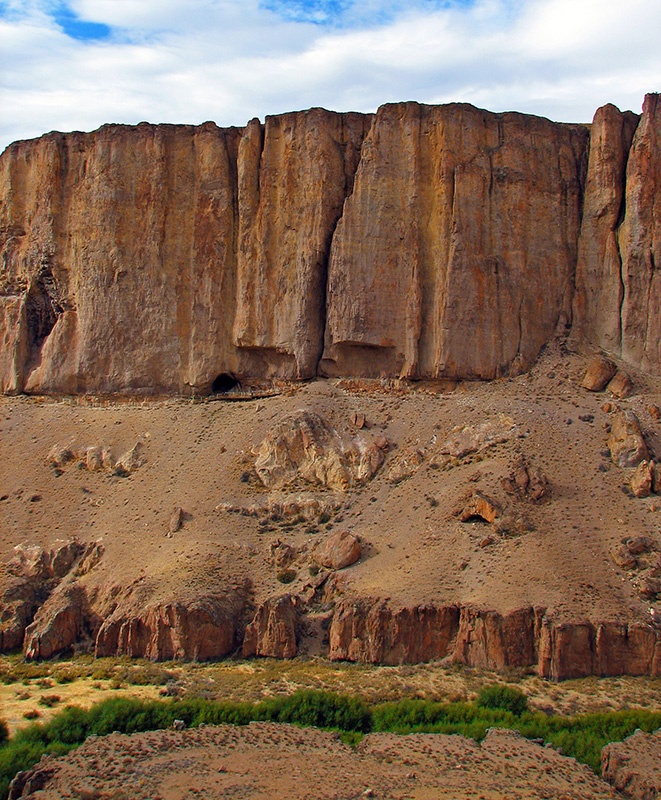
Wall of the canyon and Cueva de las Manos.

The canyon is made of ignimbrite, among other volcanic rocks formed during the Jurassic period. It was created through the erosion caused by the Pinturas River, which cut into the Chon Aike Formation to form the canyon.

The Pinturas River runs through the canyon at a height of 240 meters above sea level. The canyon is 270 meters deep and 480 meters wide. The walls of the canyon are nearly vertical, and are formed of low reliefs as well as slopes that are made up of landfall debris and sand.

== Climate ==
During the time of the Paleo-Indians, around the late Pleistocene to early Holocene geological periods, the areas between 400 and 500 meters above sea level formed a microclimate in which the canyon was home to grasslands hospitable to the animals that lived in it. This microclimate included the schinus molle plant, which was useful to native inhabitants for its ability to form resins and adhesives, as well as its use as a source of firewood. The climate was also home to edible vegetables and plants that could be used for medicine; tubers, such as the rush root; and numerous fruits, such as that of the berberis plant.

The current climate of the area of the canyon around Cueva de las Manos is cold and dry, with very low humidity; the area receives a total annual precipitation of less than 20 millimeters (0.79 in) per year. The topography of the canyon prevents the strong westward winds that are natural to the region, making winters in the canyon less severe.

== Native settlement ==
The Pinturas River running through the canyon provided water for herds of guanacos, making the area attractive to Paleoindians. In ancient times, people accessed the canyon through ravines and gorges in the East and West, typically from higher elevations around 600 to 700 meters above sea level. Natives hunted in the area of the canyon because of these plentiful guanaco, which they depended on for their own survival.

== See also ==
- List of canyons
