= Chon Aike Formation =

Geologic formation in Argentina

- Stratigraphic range: Mid Jurassic-Berriasian; ~170–140 Ma
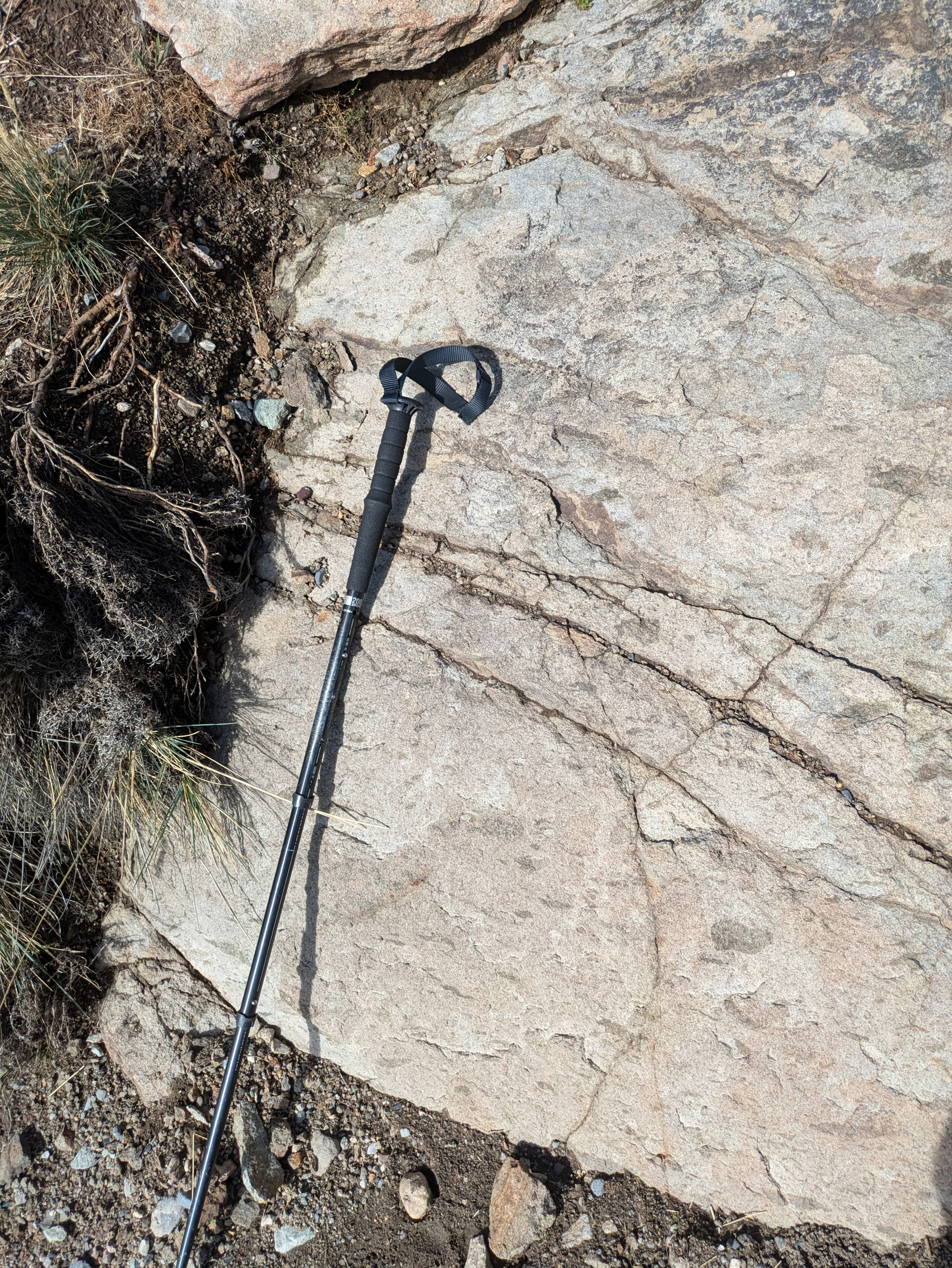
- Ignimbrite of the El Quemado Complex, uppermost part of the Chon Aike Formation
- Type: Geological formation
- Unit of: Bahía Laura Group
- Underlies: La Matilde & Pampa Rincón Formations
- Overlies: Tobífera Formation
- Area: ~100,000 km^{2} (39,000 sq mi)

Lithology
- Primary: Rhyolites, ignimbrites, lavas
- Other: Agglomerates, tuffs

Location
- Location: Patagonia
- Coordinates: 47.7°S 70.3°W
- Approximate paleocoordinates: 44.6°S 29.5°W
- Region: Santa Cruz Province
- Country: Argentina
- Extent: Deseado Massif & Austral Basin

Type section
- Named for: Cerro Chon Aike

The Chon Aike Formation is an extensive geological formation, present in the Deseado Massif in north-central Santa Cruz Province, Patagonia, Argentina. It covers an area of approximately 100,000 square kilometres (39,000 sq mi) and consists of rhyolitic volcanic rocks, particularly ignimbrites and lavas, with smaller amounts of agglomerates and tuffs. Within dacitic rocks, plant fossils have been found.

== Description ==
The Chon Aike Formation forms part of the Chon Aike Province, also known as the Tobífera Series, a large igneous province that covers 1,700,000 square kilometres (660,000 sq mi).

The northern part of the formation, Río Pinturas, has been dated to the Late Jurassic (140–160 Ma), while the western and eastern sections have been dated to 162 ± 11 Ma and 168 ± 2 Ma respectively, indicating Middle Jurassic eruptions. Fossil flora, however, suggests a Middle to Late Jurassic age. (See La Matilde Formation.)

During the break-up of Gondwana around 180–165 Ma, the opening of the Weddell Sea lead to extension along the western margin of the South American Plate, resulting in intra-plate volcanism in the Chon Aike area and rifting in the Magallanes Basin. The Chon Aike volcanism was probably related to the subduction of the Pacific Phoenix and Farallon plates.

According to Riley, "Early Jurassic silicic volcanic rocks of the Chon Aike Province (V1: 187-182 Ma) are recognized from many localities in the southern Antarctic Peninsula and northeast Patagonia and are essentially coeval with the extensive Karoo (182 Ma) and Ferrar (183 Ma) large igneous provinces of pre-breakup Gondwana.

== See also ==
- Karoo-Ferrar
- Pinturas River Canyon
- Cueva de las Manos
