= Carlos J. Gradin =

Argentine archaeologist (1918–2002)

- Carlos J. Gradin inspecting rock art at Cueva de las Manos
- Born: 20 May 1918
- Died: 31 March 2002
- Education: University of Buenos Aires
- Occupations: Archaeologist, surveyor
- Employer: National Scientific and Technical Research Council
- Spouse: Ana María Aguerre

Carlos Joaquín Gradin (20 May 1918 – 31 March 2002), also known as Carlos Gradín, was an Argentine surveyor and archaeologist. He carried out numerous studies in the Patagonian region, and is known for his extensive studies of Cueva de las Manos. He was a member of the National Scientific and Technical Research Council (CONICET).

== Education and career ==
Gradin was a member of the Institute of Archaeology of the Facultad de Filosofía y Letras, Universidad de Buenos Aires (School of Philosophy and Literature of the University of Buenos Aires). He was a recognized specialist in Patagonian rock art.

Gradin became a surveyor and archaeologist, as well as a member of CONICET. His career lasted for over 30 years.

== Archaeological work ==
Gradin carried out numerous studies in the Patagonian region. He was considered by Luis Abel Orquera to have been "the principal authority on indigenous Pampean-Patagonian art."

=== Work at Cueva de las Manos ===
Carlos Gradin is known for his extensive studies of Cueva de las Manos. Gradin and his team's study of cave art in and around Cueva de las Manos formed the most important research on the site. Him and his team began excavating the sites in 1964, which marked the beginning of their 30-year-long study.

In his studies, Gradin helped to separate the different stylistic sequences of the cave, and of rock art in Patagonia as a whole.

The importance of his discoveries to the country's natural and cultural heritage resulted in the site being named a United Nations Educational, Scientific and Cultural Organization (UNESCO) World Heritage Site in 1999.

== Death and legacy ==
Carlos J. Gradin was born in 1918 and died in 2002, making him 83 years old at the time of his death.

Gradin has an Archaeological Museum named after him in Perito Moreno, Argentina. As of 2019, the building is still under construction.
