= Perito Moreno, Santa Cruz =

Perito Moreno
- Town
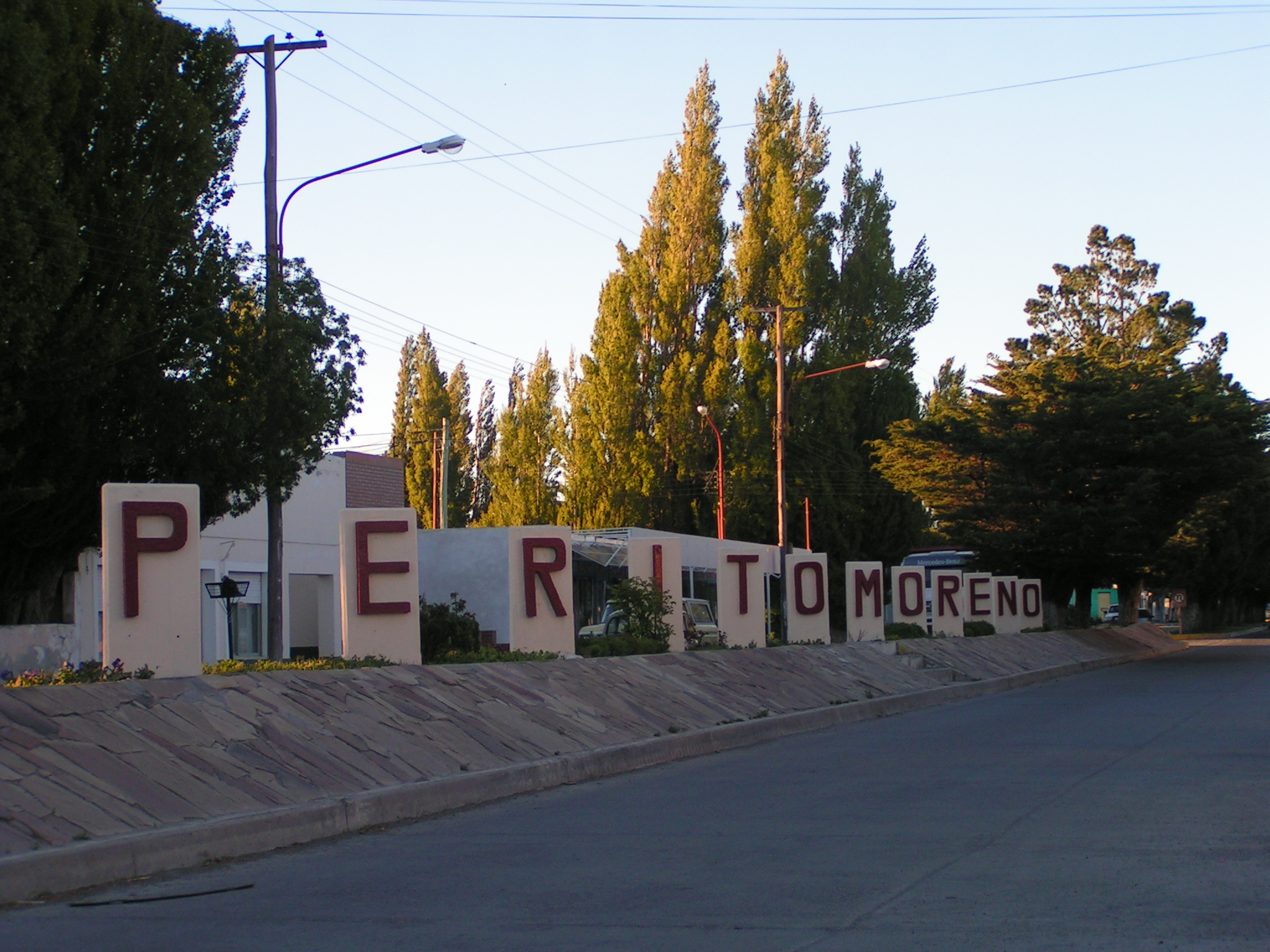
- Perito Moreno boulevard

- Location in Argentina
- Coordinates: 46°35′19″S 70°55′27″W
- Country: Argentina
- Province: Santa Cruz
- Department: Lago Buenos Aires

Government
  - Intendant: Matías Emanuel Treppo (SER Santa Cruz)
- Elevation: 517 m (1,696 ft)

Population (2022 census [INDEC])
  - Total: 7,812
- Time zone: UTC−3 (ART)
- Area code: +54
- Climate: BWk

Perito Moreno is a town in the northwest of Santa Cruz Province, Argentina, 25 km east of Lake Buenos Aires. It should not be confused with the Perito Moreno National Park over 300 km south by road, or the Perito Moreno Glacier near El Calafate. The town is the capital of the Lago Buenos Aires Department. It lies on the RN43, a paved road which links Caleta Olivia on the Atlantic coast to Los Antiguos and the Chilean frontier 60 km west, and Ruta 40, running north and south.

The town is a centre of cattle ranches and smallholdings producing fruit and vegetables. Tourism is also an important industry. Perito Moreno is the closest town to Cueva de las Manos, 170 km south by road, and Parque Laguna.

In the 2022 census the town had a population of 7,812.

== History ==
The town was founded in 1910, as a rest stop for travellers by the springs which give rise to the Rio Deseado. The place was called Pari-Aike (meaning "place of reeds") by the Tehuelche, but the town was officially called Nacimiento in 1927. The name was changed in 1944 to Lago Buenos Aires, and in 1952 to Perito Moreno, after the explorer Francisco Moreno. (Note: The term perito is an honorific that means "expert")

== Geography ==
The town is located the northwest of Santa Cruz Province, 25 km east of Lake Buenos Aires.

=== Climate ===
Perito Moreno has a cold semi-arid climate (Köppen climate classification: BSk), bordering on a cold desert climate (Köppen climate classification: BWk).

Climate data for Perito Moreno (1999–2014, extremes 1937–present) (Note: The record highs and lows are based on the Secretaria de Mineria link for the period 1951–1960 while records for the period 1937–1950 and beyond 1961 come from Servicio Meteorológico Nacional. As such, when these 2 sources are used together, the records are from 1937–present)
Month	Jan	Feb	Mar	Apr	May	Jun	Jul	Aug	Sep	Oct	Nov	Dec	Year
Record high °C (°F)	37.8 (100.0)	38.2 (100.8)	32.0 (89.6)	27.8 (82.0)	21.0 (69.8)	17.0 (62.6)	16.1 (61.0)	17.3 (63.1)	22.2 (72.0)	25.5 (77.9)	31.1 (88.0)	32.2 (90.0)	38.2 (100.8)
Mean daily maximum °C (°F)	21.8 (71.2)	20.9 (69.6)	18.9 (66.0)	14.5 (58.1)	9.7 (49.5)	6.7 (44.1)	6.7 (44.1)	8.4 (47.1)	11.7 (53.1)	14.8 (58.6)	17.6 (63.7)	20.0 (68.0)	14.3 (57.7)
Daily mean °C (°F)	15.6 (60.1)	15.1 (59.2)	12.5 (54.5)	9.1 (48.4)	5.2 (41.4)	2.3 (36.1)	1.8 (35.2)	3.6 (38.5)	6.3 (43.3)	9.3 (48.7)	11.8 (53.2)	14.6 (58.3)	8.9 (48.0)
Mean daily minimum °C (°F)	9.3 (48.7)	8.9 (48.0)	6.2 (43.2)	3.6 (38.5)	0.4 (32.7)	−1.9 (28.6)	−3.1 (26.4)	−1.3 (29.7)	0.9 (33.6)	3.5 (38.3)	5.5 (41.9)	7.8 (46.0)	3.3 (37.9)
Record low °C (°F)	−1.0 (30.2)	−3.1 (26.4)	−7.2 (19.0)	−10.5 (13.1)	−17.2 (1.0)	−20.0 (−4.0)	−25.7 (−14.3)	−23.0 (−9.4)	−11.5 (11.3)	−9.8 (14.4)	−5.2 (22.6)	−1.8 (28.8)	−25.7 (−14.3)
Average precipitation mm (inches)	5.6 (0.22)	12.9 (0.51)	11.5 (0.45)	16.8 (0.66)	24.4 (0.96)	23.1 (0.91)	16.5 (0.65)	17.9 (0.70)	13.9 (0.55)	7.5 (0.30)	9.5 (0.37)	3.3 (0.13)	162.9 (6.41)
Average precipitation days (≥ 0.1 mm)	2	1	2	4	6	7	5	7	4	3	3	1	44
Average relative humidity (%)	43	50	55	61	73	79	74	68	61	51	46	45	59
Mean monthly sunshine hours	226.3	211.9	217.0	162.0	124.0	108.0	127.1	148.8	186.0	213.9	219.0	235.6	2,179.6
Mean daily sunshine hours	7.3	7.5	7.0	5.4	4.0	3.6	4.1	4.8	6.2	6.9	7.3	7.6	6.0
Source 1: Deutscher Wetterdienst
Source 2: Servicio Meteorológico Nacional (extremes 1937–1950 and 1961–present, humidity 1951–1960), Secretaria de Mineria (extremes 1951–1960) Servicio Meteorológico Nacional (extremes 1937–1950),

== Buildings ==
The town is home to the Carlos J. Gradin Museum of Archaeology, named after Carlos J. Gradin. As of 2019, the building is still under construction.

== Culture ==
Perito Moreno is widely considered the archaeological capitol of Santa Cruz, largely due to how close it is to Cueva de las Manos. Every year in February, the town celebrates a festival of Cueva de las Manos.

== See also ==
- Perito Moreno Airport—airport serving Perito Moreno, 7 kilometres (4 mi) northwest of the town
