= Pinturas River =

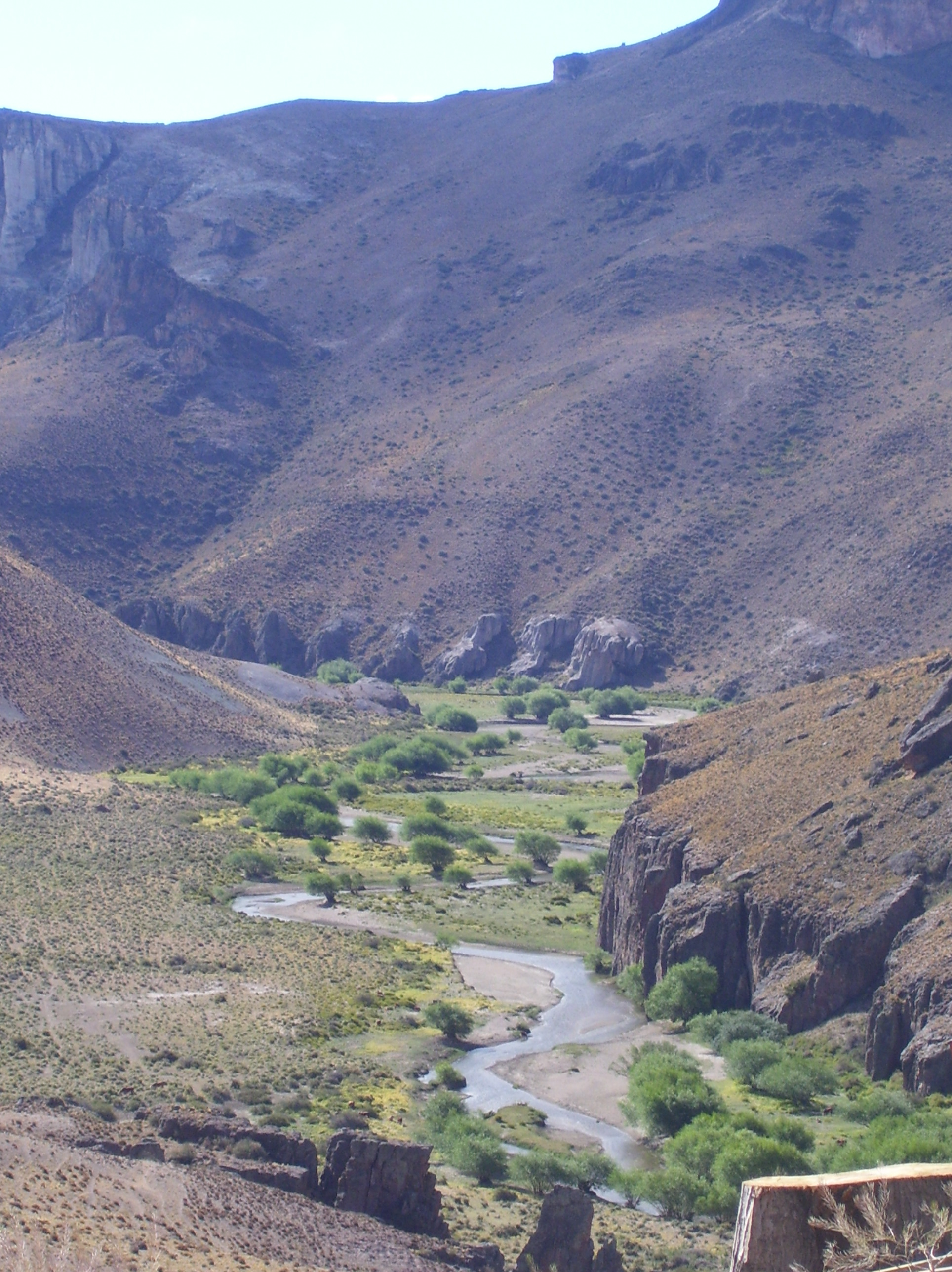
- Pinturas River as it flows through the Pinturas River Canyon.

- Location of mouth Pinturas River (Argentina)
- Etymology: From the numerous rock art sites found along the course of the river
- Native name: Río Pinturas (Spanish)

Location
- Country: Argentina
- Province: Santa Cruz

Physical characteristics
- Mouth
  - coordinates: 46°34′59″S 70°18′00″W

Basin features
- Tributaries
  - right: Ecker River

The Pinturas River (Río Pinturas, Spanish for Painted River or River of Paintings) is a river in Patagonia, Argentina, running through the Pinturas River Canyon, near the Cueva de las Manos archeological site. The river's main tributary is the Ecker River. The Pinturas River itself is a tributary of the Deseado River.

== Location ==
The Pinturas River is located in Patagonia, Argentina.

== Course ==
The river has its source in the Andes Mountains, in the small massif of Mount Zeballos (2,743 m), located south of Lake Buenos Aires. It initially runs eastward for a hundred kilometers, bending at first in the north-south direction before turning into the south-north direction. Then it continues north towards the Deseado River through the Pinturas River Canyon, where Cueva de las Manos is located. The river and the canyon are 150 km long. The Pinturas then flows into the Deseado River, completing its journey across the canyon.

The main tributary of the Pinturas River is the Ecker River. The Pinturas River runs through the Pinturas River canyon at a height of 240m above sea level.

== Prehistoric sites ==
The Pinturas River is located near many archaeological and rock art sites, which is why its Spanish name translates literally to mean the Painted River or River of Paintings. Most well known among these sites is Cueva de las Manos, a world heritage site which is located along the upper banks of the river.
