= Los Antiguos =

- Town
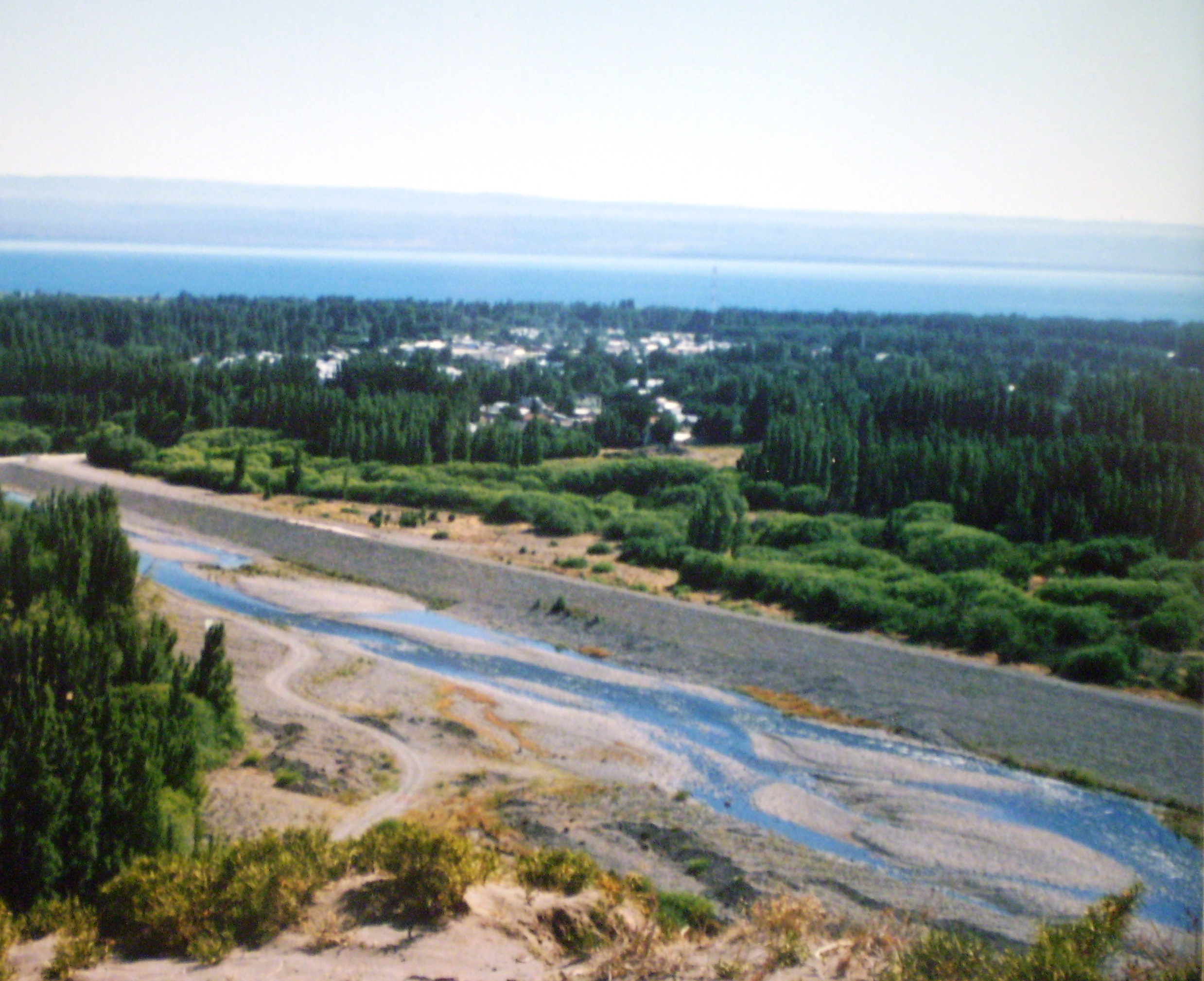

- Location in Argentina
- Coordinates: 46°32′50″S 71°37′50″W
- Country: Argentina
- Province: Santa Cruz
- Department: Lago Buenos Aires

Government
  - Intendant: Julio César Bellomo (PJ)

Population (2022 census [INDEC])
  - Total: 4,655
- Time zone: UTC−3 (ART)
- Area code: +54
- Climate: Csb

Los Antiguos is a town in Santa Cruz Province, Argentina, located on the south shore of Lago Buenos Aires. It lies 2 km from the border with Chile, and 8 km from the Chilean town of Chile Chico. It is connected to Perito Moreno and Caleta Olivia on the Atlantic coast by a paved road.

The town is an agricultural oasis, where small farms produce fruit crops. It was founded as the Leandro Alem Agricultural Colony in 1921, and was formally designated as a municipality in 1970. The area was covered by dust from the 1991 eruption of Mount Hudson, but it has since recovered.

The name of Los Antiguos is a translation of the Tehuelche name, I-Keu-khon, meaning "Place of the Elders."

In the 2022 census the town had a population of 4,655.

== Geography ==
=== Climate ===
Los Antiguos has a cold semi-arid climate (Köppen climate classification BSk) with warm, sunny summers and cold, snowy winters.

Climate data for Los Antiguos (2000–2015)
Month	Jan	Feb	Mar	Apr	May	Jun	Jul	Aug	Sep	Oct	Nov	Dec	Year
Record high °C (°F)	33.4 (92.1)	32.1 (89.8)	28.9 (84.0)	24.6 (76.3)	22.2 (72.0)	19.4 (66.9)	17.8 (64.0)	19.6 (67.3)	22.5 (72.5)	26.0 (78.8)	29.0 (84.2)	30.6 (87.1)	33.4 (92.1)
Mean daily maximum °C (°F)	21.9 (71.4)	21.7 (71.1)	18.7 (65.7)	15.7 (60.3)	11.7 (53.1)	8.9 (48.0)	8.3 (46.9)	10.0 (50.0)	13.2 (55.8)	16.2 (61.2)	18.3 (64.9)	20.6 (69.1)	15.4 (59.7)
Daily mean °C (°F)	15.9 (60.6)	15.3 (59.5)	12.6 (54.7)	9.8 (49.6)	6.5 (43.7)	4.5 (40.1)	3.4 (38.1)	4.7 (40.5)	7.4 (45.3)	10.0 (50.0)	12.2 (54.0)	14.6 (58.3)	9.7 (49.5)
Mean daily minimum °C (°F)	9.7 (49.5)	8.8 (47.8)	6.5 (43.7)	3.9 (39.0)	1.6 (34.9)	0.0 (32.0)	−1.1 (30.0)	−0.3 (31.5)	1.7 (35.1)	3.6 (38.5)	5.9 (42.6)	8.3 (46.9)	4.0 (39.2)
Record low °C (°F)	−0.5 (31.1)	−1.9 (28.6)	−2.4 (27.7)	−4.0 (24.8)	−8.5 (16.7)	−10.8 (12.6)	−11.6 (11.1)	−7.7 (18.1)	−6.0 (21.2)	−4.2 (24.4)	−3.4 (25.9)	−2.1 (28.2)	−11.6 (11.1)
Average precipitation mm (inches)	6.4 (0.25)	10.8 (0.43)	10.5 (0.41)	14.6 (0.57)	31.2 (1.23)	32.8 (1.29)	24.6 (0.97)	27.4 (1.08)	13.4 (0.53)	10.8 (0.43)	7.9 (0.31)	6.5 (0.26)	196.9 (7.76)
Average relative humidity (%)	48.6	52.7	56.1	59.6	63.3	62.5	63.3	61.3	54.7	50.4	48.2	47.9	55.7
Source: Instituto Nacional de Tecnología Agropecuaria
