= Deseado River =

River in southern Argentina

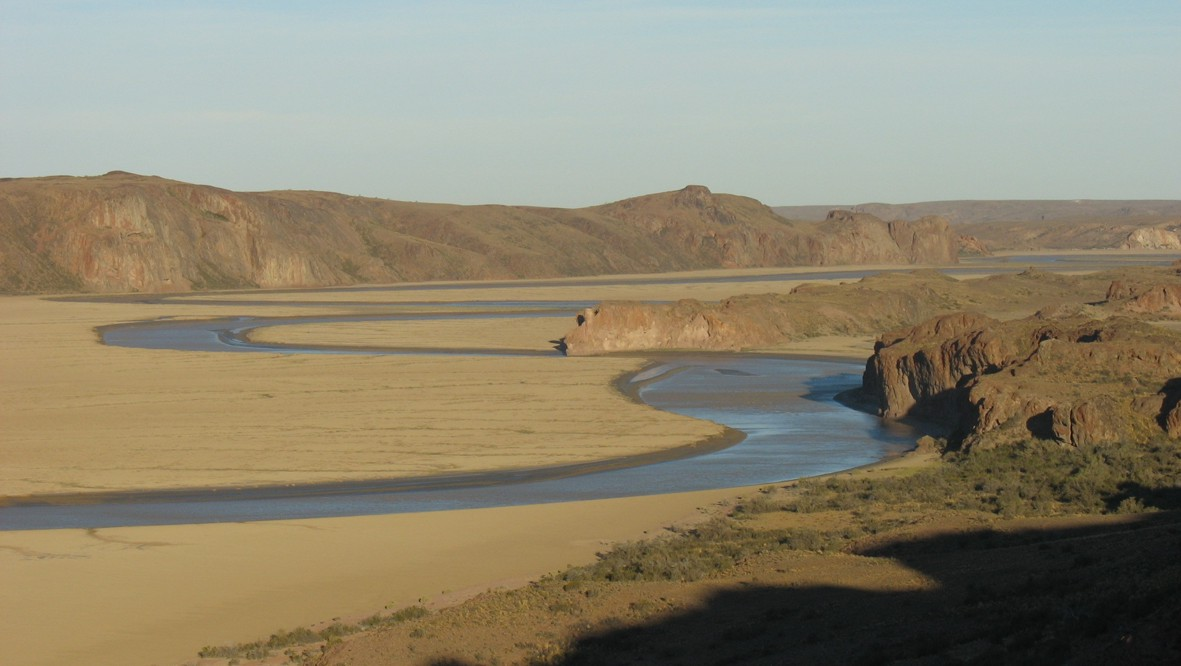
- Meandering of the Deseado River

- Location of mouth

Location
- Country: Argentina
- Province: Santa Cruz

Physical characteristics
- Mouth
  - coordinates: 47.7608°S 65.8989°W

Deseado River (Spanish: Río Deseado) is a river in the Argentine province of Santa Cruz. The name Deseado comes from the English Desire, the name of one of the two ships commanded by John Davis during the Thomas Cavendish expedition of 1592.

The source of the river is the Fénix River, some kilometers north of Buenos Aires Lake in the Andes, in the northwestern part of the province. Originally, it flowed into the lake and on, via Rio Baker, into the Pacific. In 1898, a canal was built that diverted the flow to Rio Deseado, flowing for 615 kilometres (382 mi) before reaching the Atlantic coast. On its way southeast, water is tapped for irrigation. Its tributaries include the Pinturas River.

The river sometimes disappears under the arid terrain, to re-emerge before reaching Puerto Deseado on Santa Cruz's coastline, where it empties into a deep-water natural port. The river's outlet has become submerged and flooded by seawater, creating an estuary. In 1977, this was set aside as a nature reserve, the Reserva Natural Ría Deseado.
