= List of lakes of Argentina =

The following is a list of lakes in Argentina.

== Lakes ==
Lake	Surface area	Elevation above sea level	Depth max.	Volume
Aluminé Lake	57 square kilometres (14,000 acres)	1,125 m (3,691 ft)	165 m (541 ft)	3.956 cubic kilometres (3,207,000 acre⋅ft)
Amutui Quimey Reservoir	86.7 square kilometres (21,400 acres)	485 metres (1,591 ft)		8.37 cubic kilometres (6,790,000 acre⋅ft)
Argentino Lake	1,415 km^{2} (546 sq mi)	178 m (584 ft)	719 m (2,359 ft)	219.9 km^{3} (52.8 cu mi)
Buenos Aires Lake	880 km^{2} (340 sq mi) (Argentine part only)	203 m (666 ft)	586 m (1,923 ft)	740 km^{3} (180 cu mi)
Lago Fagnano	645 km^{2} (249 sq mi)	140 m (460 ft)	449 m (1,473 ft)	125 km^{3} (30 cu mi)
Lake Cholila	17.5 km^{2} (4,300 acres)	540 metres (1,770 ft)	108 metres (354 ft)	.85 cubic kilometres (690,000 acre⋅ft)
Laguna del Diamante	14.1 km^{2} (5.4 sq mi)	10,791 ft (3,289 m)		
Espejo Lake				
Epulafquén Lake		895 m (2,936 ft)		
Futalaufquen Lake	44.6 square kilometres (11,000 acres)	518 metres (1,699 ft)	168 m (551 ft)	4.51 cubic kilometres (3,660,000 acre⋅ft)
Laguna de Guayatayoc	240 km^{2} (93 sq mi)			
Gutiérrez Lake		2,510 ft (770 m)		
Huechulafquen Lake	78.2 square kilometres (19,300 acres)	875 metres (2,871 ft)		11.1 cubic kilometres (9,000,000 acre⋅ft)
Lácar Lake	55 km^{2} (21 sq mi)	630 m (2,070 ft)	277 m (909 ft)	9.19 km^{3} (2.20 cu mi)
Mar Chiquita Lake	2,000–6,000 km^{2} (770–2,320 sq mi)	66–69 m (217–226 ft)		
Mascardi Lake	39.2 square kilometres (15.1 sq mi)	750 metres (2,460 ft)	218 metres (715 ft)	4.35 cubic kilometres (3,530,000 acre⋅ft)
Melincué Lake	120 square kilometres (46 sq mi)	86 metres (282 ft)		
Laguna Negra	4,590 ha (11,300 acres)	4,650 metres (15,260 ft)	0.2 m (7.9 in)	
Lake Menéndez	55.7 km^{2} (13,800 acres)	570 metres (1,870 ft)	287 metres (942 ft)	8.31 cubic kilometres (6,740,000 acre⋅ft)
Nahuel Huapi Lake	530 km^{2} (205 sq mi)	2,523 ft (769 m)	464 m (1,522 ft)	83.35 km^{3} (20.00 cu mi)
Puelo Lake	44 square kilometres (11,000 acres)	192 metres (630 ft)	180 metres (590 ft)	4.9 cubic kilometres (4,000,000 acre⋅ft)
Lake Rivadavia	21.7 km^{2} (5,400 acres)	527 metres (1,729 ft)	147.2 metres (483 ft)	2.25 cubic kilometres (1,820,000 acre⋅ft)
San Martín Lake	459 km^{2} (177 sq mi) (Argentine part only)	252 m (827 ft)	836 m (2,743 ft)	69 km^{3} (17 cu mi)
Viedma Lake	1,193 km^{2} (461 sq mi)	252 m (827 ft)	900 m (3,000 ft)	119 km^{3} (29 cu mi)
Vintter Lake		927 m (3,041 ft)		

== See also ==
- Water resources management in Argentina
