= List of lakes by depth =

These articles lists the world's deepest lakes.

== Lakes ranked by maximum depth ==
This list contains all lakes whose maximum depth is reliably known to exceed 400 metres (1,300 ft).

Geologically, the Caspian Sea, like the Black and Mediterranean seas, is a remnant of the ancient Tethys Ocean. The deepest area is oceanic rather than continental crust. However, it is generally regarded by geographers as a large endorheic salt lake.

Of the listed lakes; 10 have a deepest point above mean sea level. These are: Issyk-Kul, Crater Lake, Quesnel, Sarez, Toba, Tahoe, Kivu, Nahuel Huapi, Van and Poso. The other lakes on the list reaches below sea level at their deepest points. This is a list, that includes the deepest lakes in the world (1 factor: depth). Not a list of the deepest cryptodepressions (2 factors: elevation compared with depth).

Continent color key
Africa	Antarctica	Asia	Eurasia	Europe	North America	Oceania	South America

	Name	Country	Region	Depth		Depth^{2}/area
	Name	Country	Region	(meters)	(feet)	Depth^{2}/area
1.	Baikal	Russia	Southern Siberia: Buryatia and Irkutsk Oblast	1,642	5,387	9.22×10^{−6}
2.	Tanganyika	Tanzania; Democratic Republic of the Congo; Burundi; Zambia	African Great Lakes	1,470	4,823	8.1×10^{−6}
3.	(Caspian Sea)	Kazakhstan; Turkmenistan; Azerbaijan; Russia; Iran	Caspian Endorheic basin	1,025	3,363	1.68×10^{−6}
4.	Vostok	Antarctica	Under the East Antarctic Ice Sheet	~900	~2953	8.94×10^{−6}
5.	Viedma	Argentina	Santa Cruz Province	~900	~2953	N/D
6.	O'Higgins-San Martín	Chile; Argentina	Capitán Prat Province (Chile) and Santa Cruz Province (Argentina)	799	2,621	0.0006302
7.	Argentino	Argentina	Santa Cruz Province	719	2,359	1.33×10^{−5}
8.	Malawi	Malawi; Mozambique; Tanzania	African Great Lakes	706	2,316	4.1×10^{−6}
9.	Issyk Kul	Kyrgyzstan	Tien Shan Mountains	668	2,192	8.46×10^{−6}
10.	Great Slave	Canada	Northwest Territories	614	2,015	3.72×10^{−6}
11.	Crater	United States	Oregon	594	1,949	8.16×10^{−5}
12.	Matano	Indonesia	Southern Sulawesi	590	1,936	4.61×10^{−5}
13.	General Carrera-Buenos Aires	Chile; Argentina	General Carrera Province (Chile) and Santa Cruz Province (Argentina)	586	1,923	1.36×10^{−5}
14.	Hornindalsvatnet	Norway	Vestland	514	1,686	7.2×10^{−5}
15.	Quesnel	Canada	British Columbia	511	1,677	3.13×10^{−5}
16.	Sarez	Tajikistan	Gorno-Badakhshan	505	1,657	5.66×10^{−5}
16.	Toba	Indonesia	Sumatra	505	1,657	1.5×10^{−5}
18.	Tahoe	United States	California and Nevada	501	1,645	2.26×10^{−5}
19.	Salvatnet	Norway	Trøndelag	482	1,581	6.93×10^{−5}
20.	Kivu	Democratic Republic of the Congo; Rwanda	African Great Lakes	480	1,575	9.24×10^{−6}
21.	Nahuel Huapi	Argentina	Río Negro Province and Neuquén Province	464	1,523	2.02×10^{−5}
22.	Hauroko	New Zealand	Southland, South Island	462	1,516	5.82×10^{−5}
23.	Cochrane / Pueyrredón	Chile; Argentina	Capitán Prat Province (Chile) and Santa Cruz Province (Argentina)	460	1,509	2.55×10^{−5}
24.	Lake Tinn	Norway	Telemark	460	1,509	6.41×10^{−5}
25.	Adams	Canada	British Columbia	457	1,499	3.9×10^{−5}
26.	Chelan	United States	Washington (state)	453	1,486	3.9×10^{−5}
27.	Mjøsa	Norway	Innlandet and Akershus	453	1,486	2.33×10^{−5}
28.	Van	Turkey	Eastern Anatolia region	451	1,480	7.36×10^{−6}
29.	Poso	Indonesia	Sulawesi	450	1,476	2.5×10^{−5}
30.	Fagnano	Argentina; Chile	Tierra del Fuego	449	1,473	1.77×10^{−5}
31.	Great Bear	Canada	Northwest Territories	446	1,463	2.53×10^{−6}
32.	Manapouri	New Zealand	Southland, South Island	444	1,457	3.73×10^{−5}
33.	Como	Italy	Lombardy	425	1,394	3.52×10^{−5}
34.	Te Anau	New Zealand	Southland, South Island	425	1,394	2.29×10^{−5}
35.	Tazawa	Japan	Akita Prefecture, Honshu	423	1,387	8.31×10^{−5}
36.	Khantayskoye	Russia	Krasnoyarsk Krai	420	1,378	N/D
37.	Wakatipu	New Zealand	Otago, South Island	420	1,378	2.47×10^{−5}
38.	Grey	Chile	Última Esperanza Province	410	1,345	N/D
39.	Superior	Canada; United States	Ontario (Canada) and Michigan, Minnesota, Wisconsin (United States)	406	1,332	1.42×10^{−6}

== Lakes ranked by mean depth ==
Mean depth can be a more useful indicator than maximum depth for many ecological purposes. Unfortunately, accurate mean depth figures are only available for well-studied lakes, as they must be calculated by dividing the lake's volume by its surface area. A reliable volume figure requires a bathymetric survey. Therefore, mean depth figures are not available for many deep lakes in remote locations. The average lake on Earth has the mean depth 41.8 meters (137.14 feet)

The Caspian Sea ranks much further down the list on mean depth, as it has a large continental shelf (significantly larger than the oceanic basin that contains its greatest depths).

Of the 129 registered lakes; 69 are known to be cryptodepressions. These include: Vostok (subglacial surface), Concordia (subglacial surface), (Caspian Sea) (subsea surface), Dead Sea (subsea surface) and Jökulsárlón (glacial lagoon estuary). The remaining 60 lakes have got their entire basin above the sea level.

This list contains all lakes whose mean depth is reliably known to exceed 100 metres (328 ft).

Continent colour key
Africa	Antarctica	Asia	Eurasia	Europe	North America	Oceania	South America

	Name	Country	Region	Depth	
	Name	Country	Region	(meters)	(feet)
1.	Baikal	Russia	Southern Siberia: Buryatia and Irkutsk Oblast	744.4	2,442
2.	Tanganyika	Tanzania; Democratic Republic of the Congo; Burundi; Zambia	African Great Lakes	570	1,870
3.	Vostok	Antarctica	Under the East Antarctic Ice Sheet	432	1,417
4.	General Carrera-Buenos Aires	Chile; Argentina	General Carrera Province (Chile) and Santa Cruz Province (Argentina)	400	1,312
5.	Crater	United States	Oregon	352.8	1,157
6.	Tahoe	United States	California and Nevada	307.6	1,009
7.	Adams	Canada	British Columbia, (Shuswap)	299	981
8.	Malawi	Malawi; Mozambique; Tanzania	African Great Lakes	292	958
9.	Tazawa	Japan	Honshu	280	919
10.	Issyk Kul	Kyrgyzstan	Tien Shan Mountains	278.4	913
11.	Shikotsu	Japan	Hokkaido	265.4	871
12.	Concordia	Antarctica	Antarctic Plateau	250	820
13.	Crveno	Croatia	Imotski Area	245	804
14.	Kivu	Democratic Republic of the Congo; Rwanda	African Great Lakes	240	787
14.	Matano	Indonesia	Sulawesi	240	787
16.	Hornindalsvatnet	Norway	Vestland	237.6	780
17.	Quilotoa	Ecuador	Cotopaxi Province	220	722
18.	Wakatipu	New Zealand	Otago, South Island	217	712
19.	Toba	Indonesia	Sumatra	216	709
20.	Heaven	North Korea; China	Ryanggang Province (North Korea) and Jilin Province (China)	213	699
21.	(Caspian Sea)	Kazakhstan; Turkmenistan; Azerbaijan; Russia; Iran	Caspian Endorheic basin	211	692
22.	Karakul	Tajikistan	Pamir Mountains	210	689
23.	Sarez	Tajikistan	Gorno-Badakhshan	201.8	662
24.	Kurile	Russia	Kamchatka Peninsula	195	640
25.	Fagnano	Argentina; Chile	Tierra del Fuego	193.8	636
26.	Lake Tinn	Norway	Telemark	190	623
26.	Todos los Santos	Chile	Llanquihue Province	190	623
28.	Dead Sea	Jordan; Palestine; Israel	Middle East	188.4	618
29.	Chapo	Chile	Llanquihue Province	183.1	601
30.	Llanquihue	Chile	Llanquihue Province and Osorno Province	182	597
31.	Maggiore	Italy; Switzerland	Lombardy, Piedmont (Italy) and Ticino (Switzerland)	177.4	582
32.	Ranau	Indonesia	Sumatra	174	571
32.	Teletskoye	Russia	Altai Mountains	174	571
34.	Brienz	Switzerland	Bern	173	568
34.	Colico	Chile	Cautín Province	173	568
34.	Traful	Argentina	Neuquén Province	173	568
37.	Lundevatnet	Norway	Rogaland and Agder	172	564
38.	Slocan	Canada	British Columbia, (West Kootenay)	171	561
38.	Van	Turkey	Eastern Anatolia region	171	561
40.	Ilopango	El Salvador	San Salvador, La Paz and Cuscatlán	170	558
41.	Te Anau	New Zealand	Southland, South Island	168.8	554
42.	Lácar	Argentina	Neuquén Province	167	548
43.	Rupanco	Chile	Osorno Province	163	535
44.	Riñihue	Chile	Valdivia Province	162	531
45.	Hāwea	New Zealand	Otago, South Island	161	528
45.	Nimpkish	Canada	British Columbia,(Vancouver Island)	161	528
47.	Wānaka	New Zealand	Otago, South Island	160	525
48.	Azure	Canada	British Columbia, (Wells Gray)	157.2	516
49.	Nahuel Huapi	Argentina	Río Negro Province and Neuquén Province	157	515
49.	Quesnel	Canada	British Columbia, (Likely and Horsefly)	157	515
51.	Suldalsvatnet	Norway	Rogaland	156	512
52.	Argentino	Argentina	Santa Cruz Province	155.4	510
53.	Del Toro	Chile	Última Esperanza Province	155	508
53.	Ohrid	North Macedonia; Albania	Balkans	155	508
53.	Salvatnet	Norway	Trøndelag	155	508
56.	Atitlán	Guatemala	Guatemalan Highlands of the Sierra Madre	154	505
56.	Como	Italy	Lombardy	154	505
58.	Geneva	Switzerland France	Vaud, Geneva, Valais (Switzerland) and Haute-Savoie (France)	153.4	503
59.	Jökulsárlón	Iceland	Vatnajökull National Park	153	502
60.	Harrison	Canada	British Columbia, (Coast Mountains)	151.4	497
61.	Mjøsa	Norway	Innlandet and Akershus	150	492
61.	Powell	Canada	British Columbia, (Sunshine Coast)	150	492
63.	Menéndez	Argentina	Chubut Province	149.9	492
64.	Manapouri	New Zealand	Southland, South Island	149	489
64.	Singkarak	Indonesia	Western Sumatra	149	489
66.	Lake Superior	Canada; United States	Ontario (Canada) and Michigan, Minnesota, Wisconsin (United States)	147	482
67.	Chelan	United States	Washington (state)	144	472
68.	Huechulafquen	Argentina	Neuquén Province	142	466
68.	Pend Oreille	United States	Idaho	142	466
70.	Anderson	Canada	British Columbia, (Lillooet)	140	459
70.	Nemrut	Turkey	Bitlis Province	140	459
70.	Redoubt	United States	Alaska, (Baranof Island)	140	459
73.	Storsjøen	Norway	Innlandet	139	456
74.	Khövsgöl	Mongolia	Nearby the eastern, Sayan Mountains	138	453
75.	Mashū	Japan	Hokkaido	137.5	451
76.	Lonar	India	Deccan Plateau	137	449
76.	Ørsdalsvatnet	Norway	Rogaland	137	449
78.	Garda	Italy	Lombardy, Veneto and Trentino	136	446
78.	Thun	Switzerland	Bern	136	446
80.	Ikeda	Japan	Kyushu	135	443
80.	Yelcho	Chile	Palena Province	135	443
82.	Lugano	Switzerland; Italy	Ticino (Switzerland) and Lombardy (Italy)	134	440
83.	Loch Ness	United Kingdom	Scottish Highlands	132	433
84.	Oppstrynsvatnet	Norway	Vestland	131	429
85.	Breimsvatnet	Norway	Vestland	129	423
86.	Mainit	Philippines	Mindanao	128	420
87.	Panguipulli	Chile	Valdivia Province	126	413
88.	Great Central	Canada	British Columbia, (Vancouver Island)	124	407
88.	Iseo	Italy	Lombardy	124	407
90.	Greve	Chile	Última Esperanza Province	123.3	405
91.	Ranco	Chile	Ranco Province	122	400
91.	Timiskaming	Canada	Ontario and Quebec	122	400
93.	Bandak	Norway	Telemark	121	397
93.	Maihue	Chile	Ranco Province	121	397
95.	Fyresvatnet	Norway	Telemark	120	394
95.	Kanas	China	Xinjiang, Altay Prefecture	120	394
95.	Towuti	Indonesia	Southern Sulawesi	120	394
95.	Villarrica	Chile	Cautín Province	120	394
99.	Garibaldi	Canada	British Columbia, (Coast Mountains)	119	390
100.	Caburgua	Chile	Cautín Province	117	384
100.	Toya	Japan	Hokkaido	117	384
102.	Hauroko	New Zealand	Southland, South Island	116.7	383
103.	Calafquén	Chile	Valdivia Province	115	377
104.	Mabel	Canada	British Columbia, (Shuswap)	114	374
105.	Poteriteri	New Zealand	Southland, South Island	113.1	371
106.	Mascardi	Argentina	Río Negro Province	111	364
106.	Puelo	Argentina	Chubut Province	111	364
108.	Lake Taupō	New Zealand	Waikato, North Island	110	360
109.	Öskjuvatn	Iceland	Highlands of Iceland	109	358
110.	Chilko	Canada	British Columbia, (Chilcotin)	108	354
111.	Murtle	Canada	British Columbia, (Wells Gray)	107	351
111.	Titicaca	Peru; Bolivia	Puno Region (Peru) and La Paz Department (Bolivia)	107	351
113.	Tatlayoko	Canada	British Columbia, (Chilcotin)	106.4	349
114.	Gander	Canada	Newfoundland	105.4	346
115.	Guinas	Namibia	Oshikoto Region, Tsumeb	105	344
115.	Kauhakō Crater	United States	Hawaii, (Molokai)	105	344
115.	Maninjau	Indonesia	Central Sumatra	105	344
118.	Walen	Switzerland	St. Gallen and Glarus	104.7	343
119.	Lucerne	Switzerland	Central Switzerland	104	341
119.	Sarmiento	Chile	Última Esperanza Province	104	341
121.	Rivadavia	Argentina	Chubut Province	103.7	340
122.	Takla	Canada	British Columbia, (Mount Blanchet)	103.1	338
123.	Cochrane / Pueyrredón	Chile; Argentina	Capitán Prat Province (Chile) and Santa Cruz Province (Argentina)	101.8	334
124.	Clearwater	Canada	British Columbia, (Wells Gray)	101.6	333
125.	Futalaufquen	Argentina	Chubut Province	101	331
126.	Nueltin	Canada	Nunavut and Manitoba	100	328
126.	Rara	Nepal	Karnali Province	100	328
126.	Taal	Philippines	Southern Luzon	100	328
126.	Viedma	Argentina	Santa Cruz Province	100	328

== Greatest maximum depth by continent ==
- Africa — 1: Tanganyika, 2: Malawi, 3: Kivu
- Antarctica — 1: Radok (surface lake). — 1: Vostok (subglacial lake), 2: Concordia (subglacial lake), 3: Ellsworth (subglacial lake).
- Asia — 1: Baikal, 2: Issyk Kul, 3: Matano
- Eurasia — 1: Baikal, 2: Caspian Sea, 3: Issyk Kul
- Europe — 1: Hornindalsvatnet, 2: Salvatnet, 3: Lake Tinn
- North America — 1: Great Slave, 2: Crater, 3: Quesnel
  - Central America — 1: Atitlán, 2: Chicabal, 3: Ilopango
- Oceania — 1: Hauroko, 2: Manapouri, 3: Te Anau
  - Australia — 1: St Clair
- South America — 1: Viedma, 2: O'Higgins/San Martín, 3: Argentino

== Greatest mean depth by continent ==
- Africa — 1: Tanganyika, 2: Malawi, 3: Kivu
- Antarctica — 1: Vostok (subglacial lake), 2: Concordia (subglacial lake), 3: Ellsworth (subglacial lake).
- Asia — 1: Baikal, 2: Tazawa, 3: Issyk-Kul
- Europe — 1: Crveno, 2: Hornindalsvatnet, 3: Lake Tinn
- North America — 1: Crater, 2: Tahoe, 3: Adams
- Oceania — 1: Wakatipu, 2: Te Anau, 3: Hāwea
- South America — 1: General Carrera-Buenos Aires, 2: Quilotoa, 3: Fagnano

== See also ==
- List of lakes by area
- List of lakes by volume
- List of largest lakes of Europe

== Notes ==
Note: Lake depths often vary depending on sources. The depths used here are the most reliable figures available in recent sources. See the articles on individual lakes for more details and data sources.

== Sources ==
- Worldlakes.org, Deepest lakes
