= Lake Cholila =

Lake in Argentina

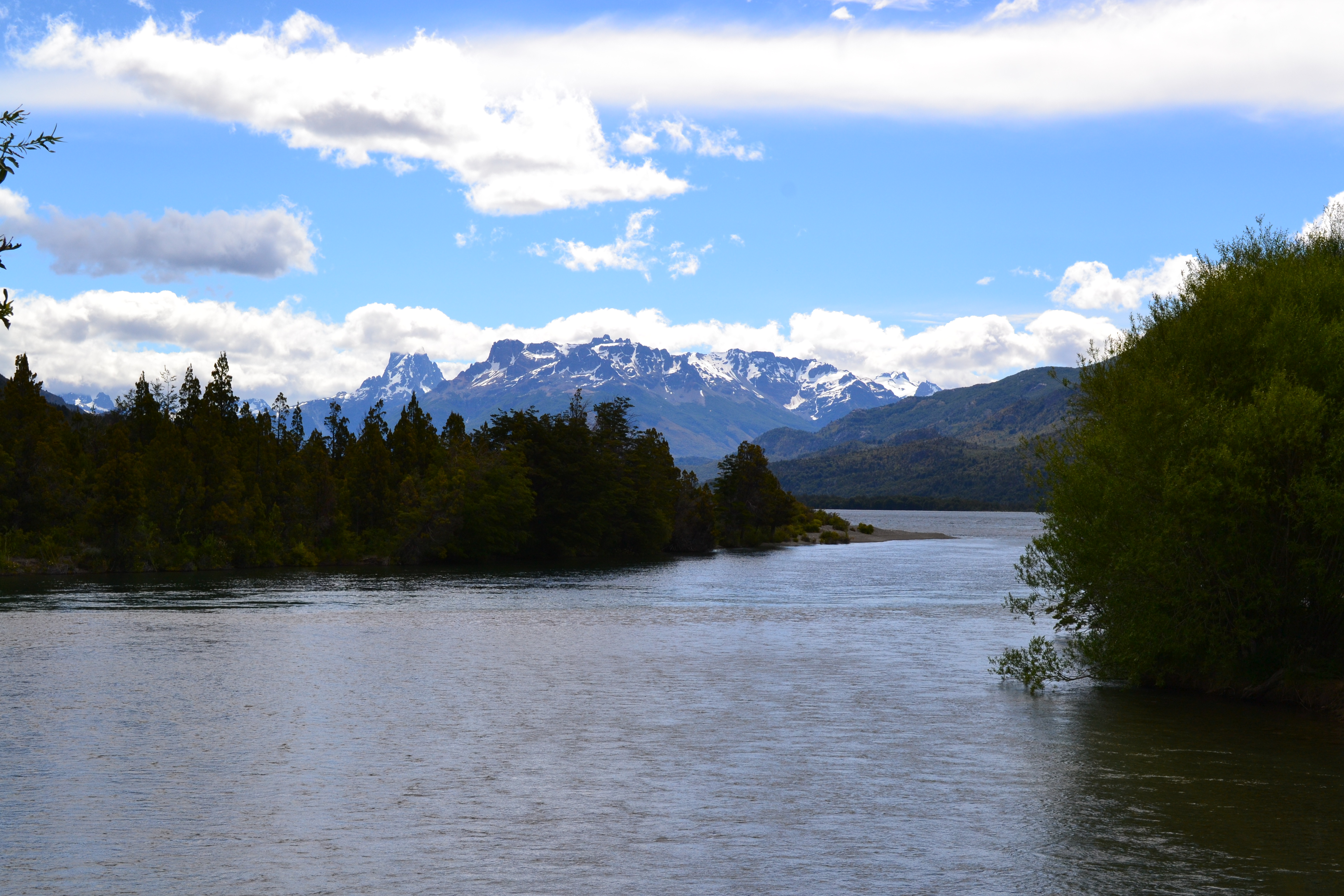
- Snow-capped Andes peaks overlook Lake Cholila

- Location within Chubut Province Location within Argentina
- Location: Chubut Province, Argentina
- Coordinates: 42°27′36″S 71°40′40″W
- Lake type: glacial lake
- Primary inflows: Tigre River
- Primary outflows: Carrileufú River, discharge 19.3 cubic metres (680 ft^{3}) per second
- Catchment area: 609 kilometres (378 mi)
- Basin countries: Argentina
- Max. length: 18 kilometres (11 mi)
- Max. width: 1.5 kilometres (0.93 mi)
- Surface area: 17.5 km^{2} (4,300 acres)
- Average depth: 48.5 metres (159 ft)
- Max. depth: 108 metres (354 ft)
- Water volume: .85 cubic kilometres (690,000 acre⋅ft)
- Residence time: 0.52 years
- Surface elevation: 540 metres (1,770 ft)

Lake Cholila (Lago Cholila) is a lake in Chubut Province, Argentina. It is the uppermost of several large lakes in the country's Futaleufú River system that, via Yelcho Lake and the Yelcho River, flow into the Pacific Ocean in Chile. The lake is of glacial origin and occupies a narrow east to west valley between glaciated peaks of the Andes.

== Description ==
The Tigre River is born in glaciers at an altitude of about 1,500 metres (4,900 ft) along the border with Chile. From its source, it flows eastward about 30 kilometres (19 mi) to enter the upper end of Lake Cholila. The outlet at the lower end of the lake is the Carrileufú River (River of Green Waters in the Mapuche language). The highest mountain in Chubut Province is Tres Picos, 2,515 metres (8,251 ft), about 10 kilometres (6.2 mi) west northwest of Lake Cholila. The Carrileufú River should not be confused with the Carrenleufú or Palena River. Both names derive from the same Mapuche word. Although the lake is not located in a national park, the lake shore is mostly in a natural state. Cattle raising, tourism, and sport fishing are the principal occupations of the sparsely populated region.

After leaving Lake Cholila the Carrileufú River is joined by the outflow from Lake Mosquito (Lake Pellegrini) and Lake Lezana and then flows into the upper end of Lake Rivadavia, approximately 20 kilometres (12 mi) river miles and 10 kilometres (6.2 mi) south of Lake Cholila in a straight line distance.

== Recreation ==
Sport fishing is popular in the lake and in the rivers. Trout, not native to South America, are the chief attraction, including brook trout, brown trout, rainbow trout, and landlocked Atlantic salmon. Native species of fish include trucha criolla (Percichthys trucha) and puyen (Galaxias). Boating is popular on the lake and rafting, kayaking, and canoeing are popular on the Carrileufú River below the lake.

== Butch Cassidy ==
For several months in 1905, the outlaws Butch Cassidy and the Sundance Kid may have hidden from Pinkerton detectives in a cabin where the Tigre River joins Lake Cholila. The two outlaws owned a ranch near the town of Cholila.
