= Lake Rivadavia =

Lake in Chubut, Argentina

- Location within Argentina
- Location: Chubut Province, Argentina,
- Coordinates: 42°36′S 71°39′W
- Lake type: glacial lake
- Primary inflows: Carrileufú River
- Primary outflows: Rivadavia River
- Catchment area: 1,647 square kilometres (636 sq mi)
- Basin countries: Argentina
- Max. length: 13 kilometres (8.1 mi)
- Max. width: 2.5 kilometres (1.6 mi)
- Surface area: 21.7 km^{2} (5,400 acres)
- Average depth: 103.7 metres (340 ft)
- Max. depth: 147.2 metres (483 ft)
- Water volume: 2.25 cubic kilometres (1,820,000 acre⋅ft)
- Residence time: 3.6 years
- Surface elevation: 527 metres (1,729 ft)

Lake Rivadavia (Lago Rivadavia) is a lake in Chubut Province, Argentina. Lake Rivadavia is the second lake, after Lake Cholila, in the chain of lakes in the Futaleufú River system of Argentina which via Yelcho Lake and the Yelcho River flows into the Pacific Ocean in Chile. Located in the Andes, Lake Rivadavia is of glacial origin and occupies a narrow north to south valley between glaciated peaks. All the lake except the northern tip is in the Los Alerces National Park. Argentina Provincial Highway 71 (RP 71) (unpaved in 2016) follows the eastern coast of the lake. Development consists only of a few campgrounds near the highway.

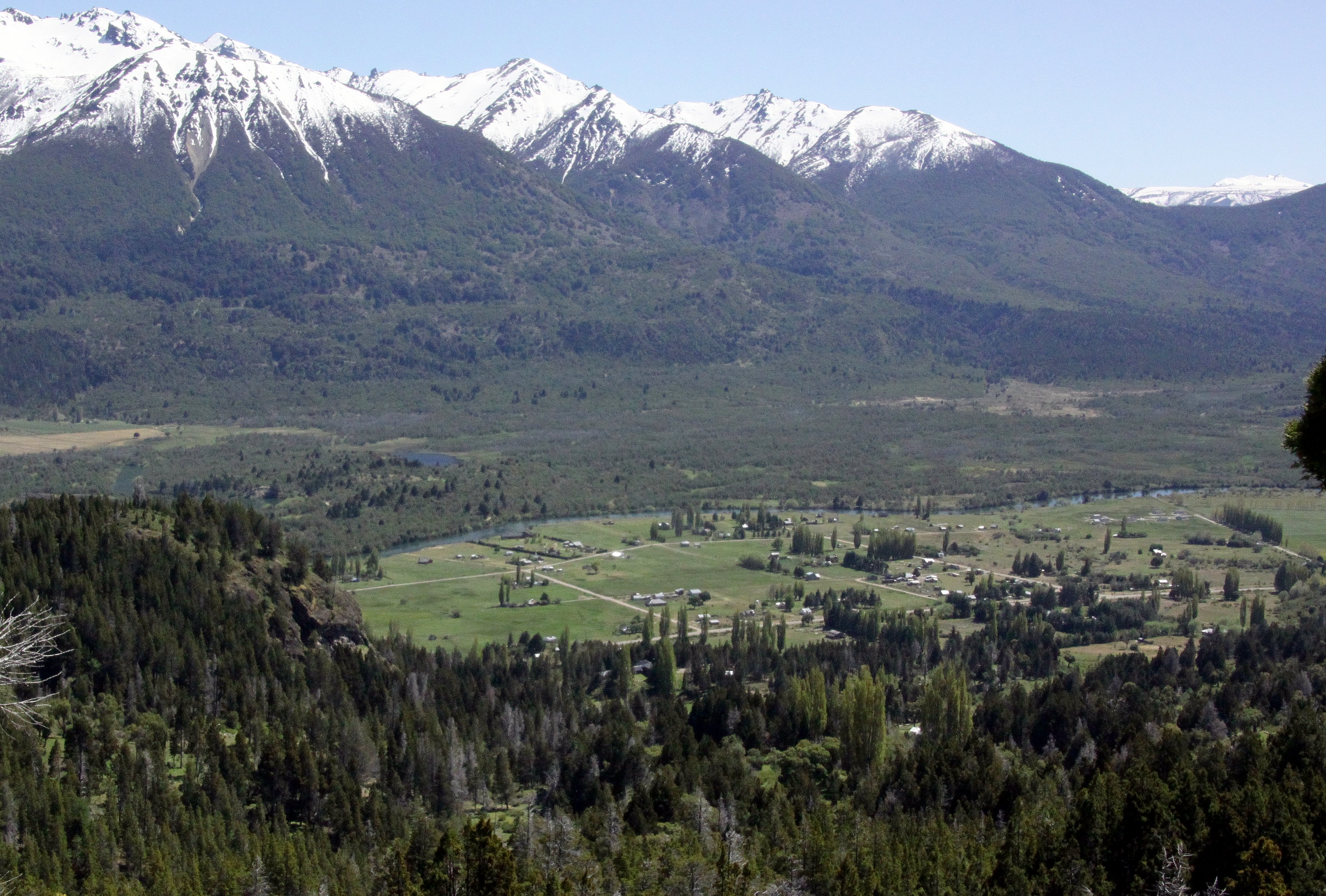
Villa Lago Rivadavia about 3 kilometres (1.9 mi) from the northern edge of the lake.

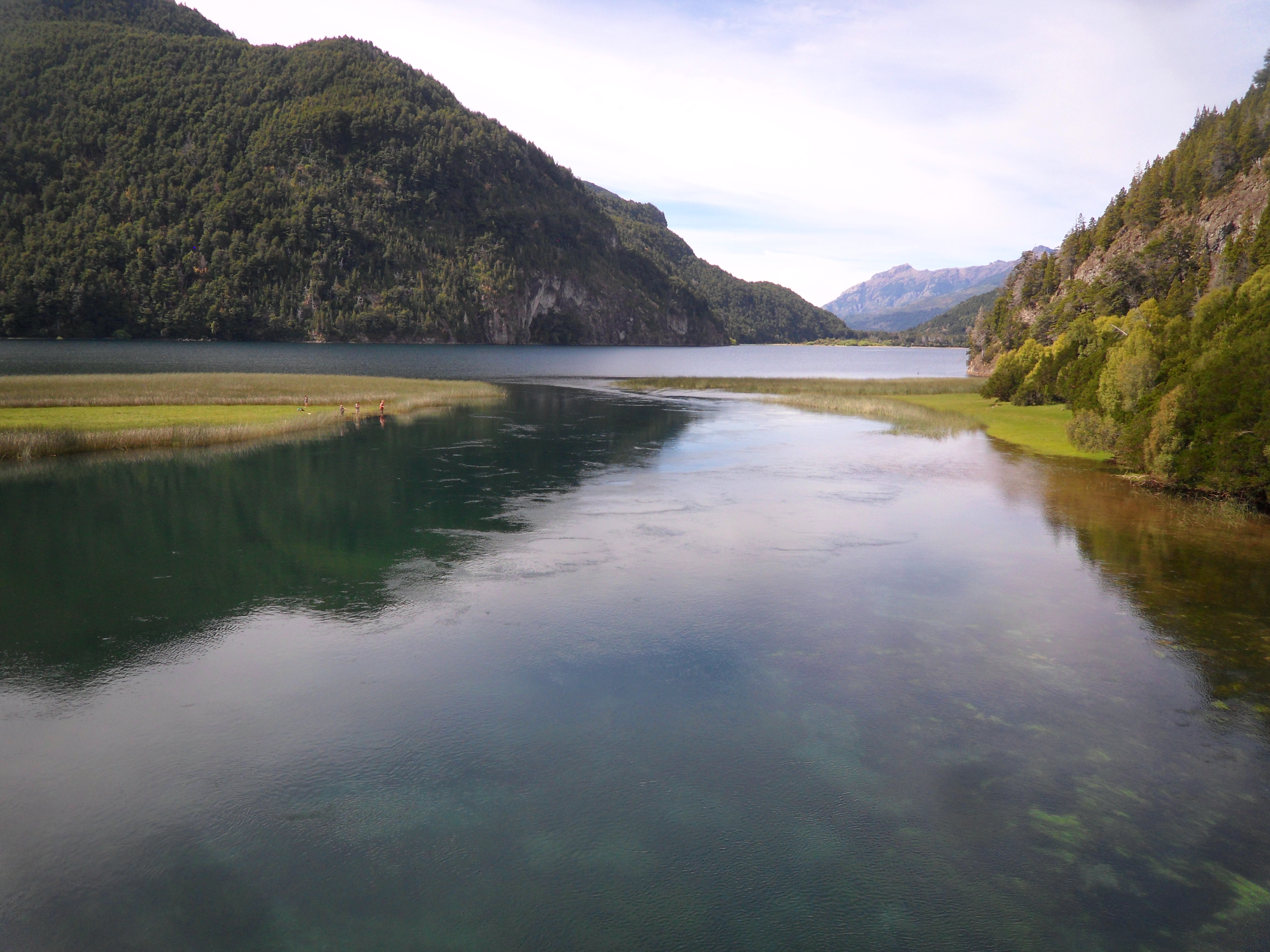
Green Lake (Lago Verde) from the footbridge across the Arrayanes River.

Villa Lago Rivadavia is the only nearby town and is located 3 km (1.9 miles) north of the lakeshore.

== Description ==
Lake Rivadavia sits in a fjord-like trench at an elevation of 527 metres (1,729 ft) between glaciated mountains rising to Sierra Rivadavia, 1,924 metres (6,312 ft) on the east and Cerro Coronado, 2,097 metres (6,880 ft) on the west. Glaciers descend the mountain slopes to an elevation of about 1,500 metres (4,900 ft). The Jara River joins the Lake Rivadavia on the west side near its southern end. The outflow from the lake is the Rivadavia River, which flows 6.7 kilometres (4.2 mi) to Green Lake (Lago Verde), 151 hectares (370 acres) in size, a much smaller lake than Rivadavia. The Rivadavia River and Lago Verde are famous for trout fishing with "turquoise water, Jurassic Park like jungle, and snow-capped peaks." Rainbow, brown, and brook trout and landlocked Atlantic Salmon are found in the lake and river, all of them introduced rather than native.

The outlet from Green Lake is called the Arrayanes River. A pedestrian bridge crosses the river near the outlet. The Arrayanes is joined by the outlet from Lake Menéndez, and flows about 5 kilometres (3.1 mi) to Futalaufquen Lake. Argentina Provincial Highway 71 follows the shoreline of Green Lake and the Arrayanes River to Futalaufquen Lake. Campgrounds and lodges accommodate visitors.
