= Futalaufquen Lake =

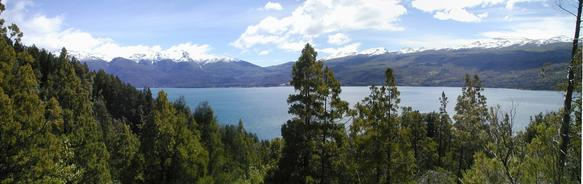

- Location within Argentina
- Location: Futaleufú Department, Chubut Province
- Coordinates: 42°49′43″S 71°38′17″W
- Type: Glacial lake
- Primary inflows: Arrayanes River
- Primary outflows: Lake Kruger, Frey River
- Catchment area: 2,920 km^{2} (1,130 sq mi)
- Basin countries: Argentina
- Max. length: 16 kilometres (9.9 mi)
- Max. width: 2.5 kilometres (1.6 mi)
- Surface area: 44.6 square kilometres (11,000 acres)
- Average depth: 101 m (331 ft)
- Max. depth: 168 m (551 ft)
- Water volume: 4.51 cubic kilometres (3,660,000 acre⋅ft)
- Residence time: .94 years
- Shore length^{1}: 72.5 km (45.0 mi)
- Surface elevation: 518 metres (1,699 ft)
- ^{1} Shore length is not a well-defined measure.

Futalaufquen Lake (Lago Futalaufquen) is a large lake in Chubut Province, Argentina. Futalaufquen Lake is in the chain of lakes of the Futaleufú River system of Argentina which via Yelcho Lake and the Yelcho River flows into the Pacific Ocean in Chile. Located in the Andes, Lake Futalaufquen is three-lobed, of glacial origin, and occupies narrow valleys between glaciated peaks. It is located in the Andes within Los Alerces National Park. The name comes from the Mapuche language. "Futa" means great, and "laufquen" means lake.

A highway runs along the eastern arm of the lake. Tourist facilities and the National Park headquarters and Futalaufquen village are there. Fishing for trout is popular in the lake.

== Description ==
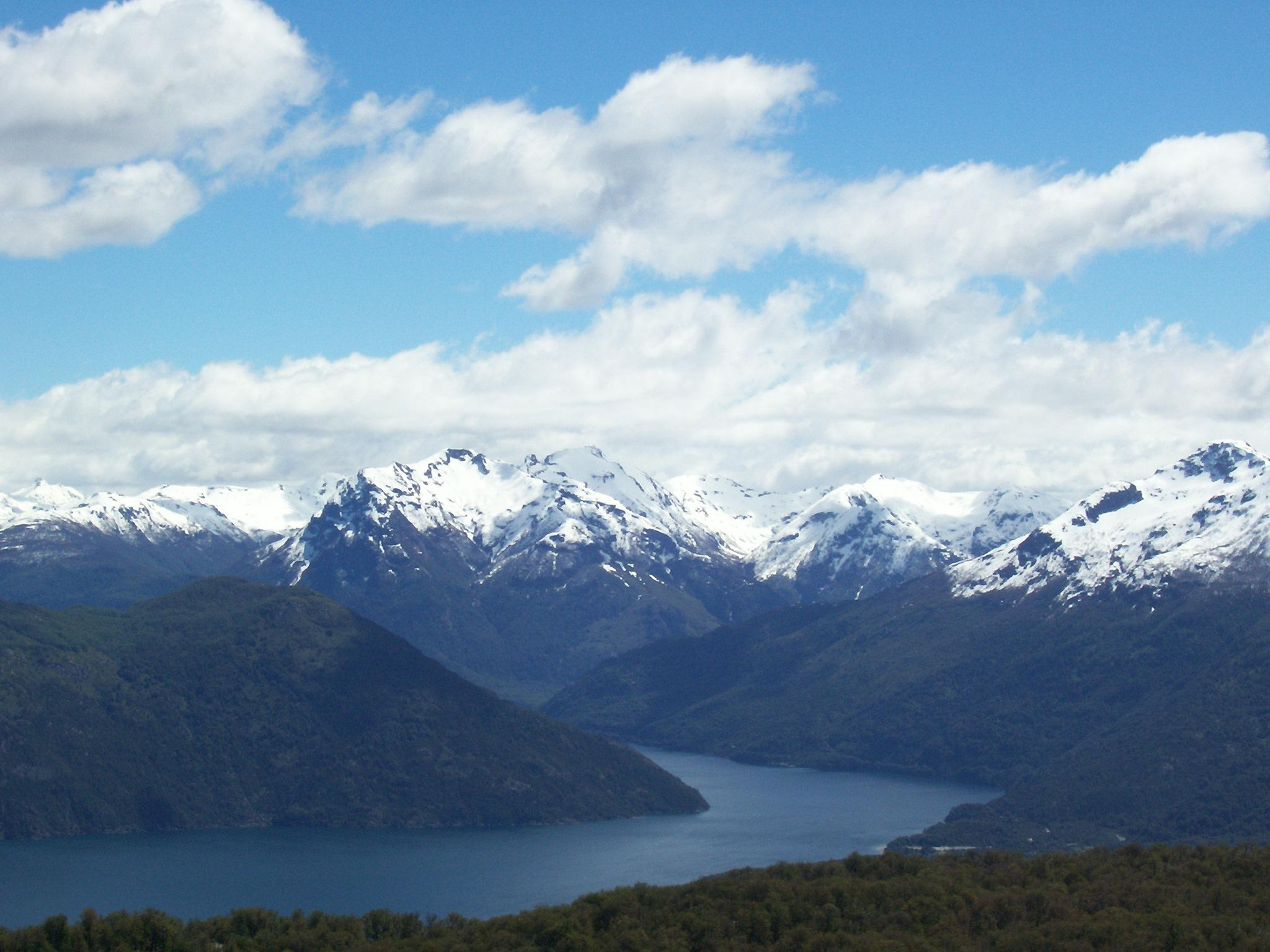
View of Futalaufquen Lake

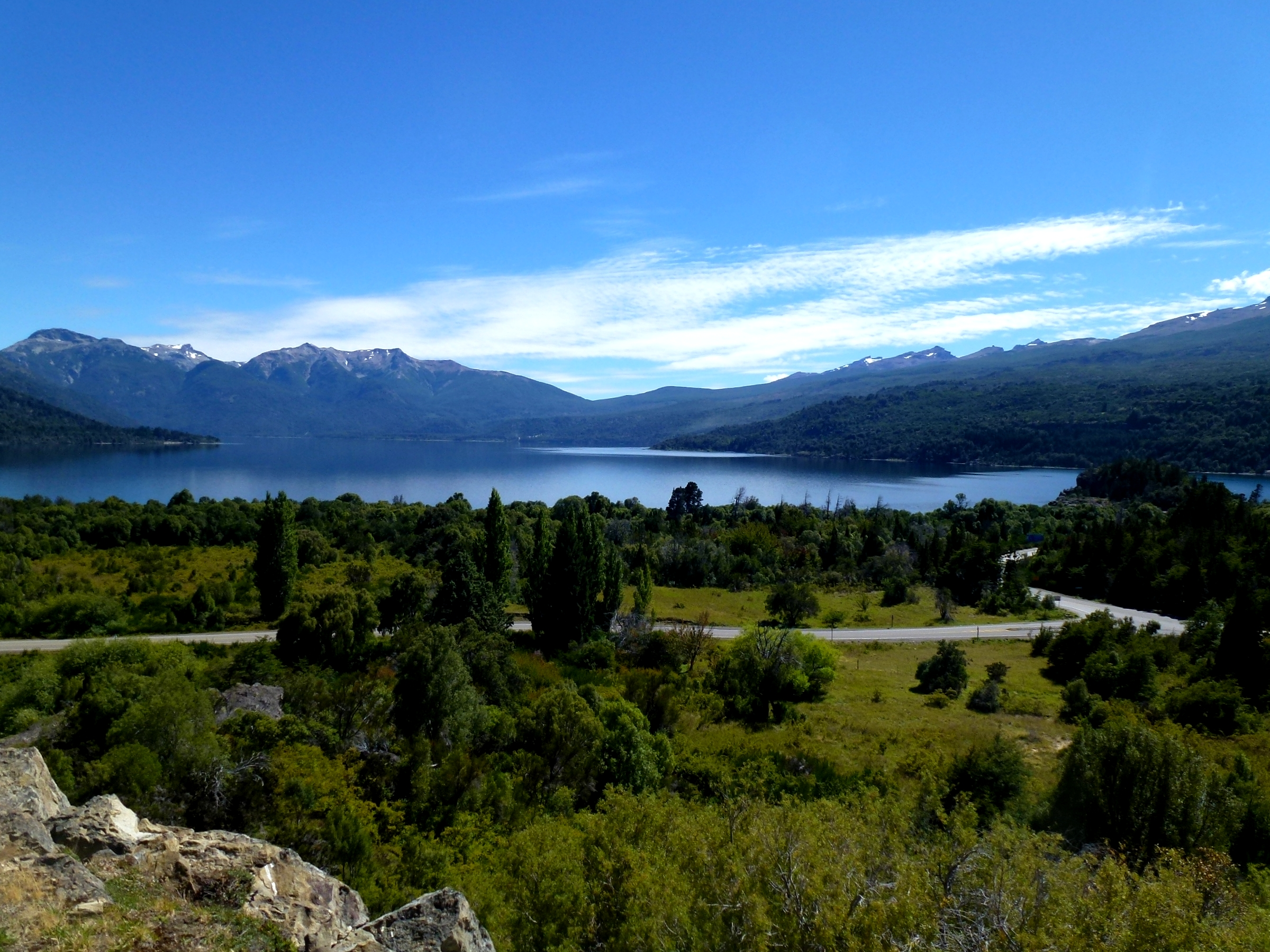
A highway and tourist facilities are along the eastern shore of the lake.

The Arrayanes River flows about 5 kilometres (3.1 mi) to Futalaufquen Lake after collecting the outflow from Lake Menéndez and Lake Rivadavia. The Arrayanes River is named after the trees of the same name found along its banks (the Arrayanes tree is commonly called the Chilean Myrtle in English). The Arrayanes River is noted for its scenery and sport fishing, especially for rainbow trout, an introduced species. The outlet for Futalaufquen Lake is the western arm. The lake flows through a narrow passage called the "Monster Narrows" (estrecho de los monstruos) into Kruger Lake, 461 hectares (1,140 acres) in size. The Narrows acquired that name because of the large trout that can be seen in the crystal-clear water. The outflow from Kruger Lake is called the Frey River which flows into Amutui Quimey Reservoir, the next large lake in the chain.
