= Lake Menéndez =

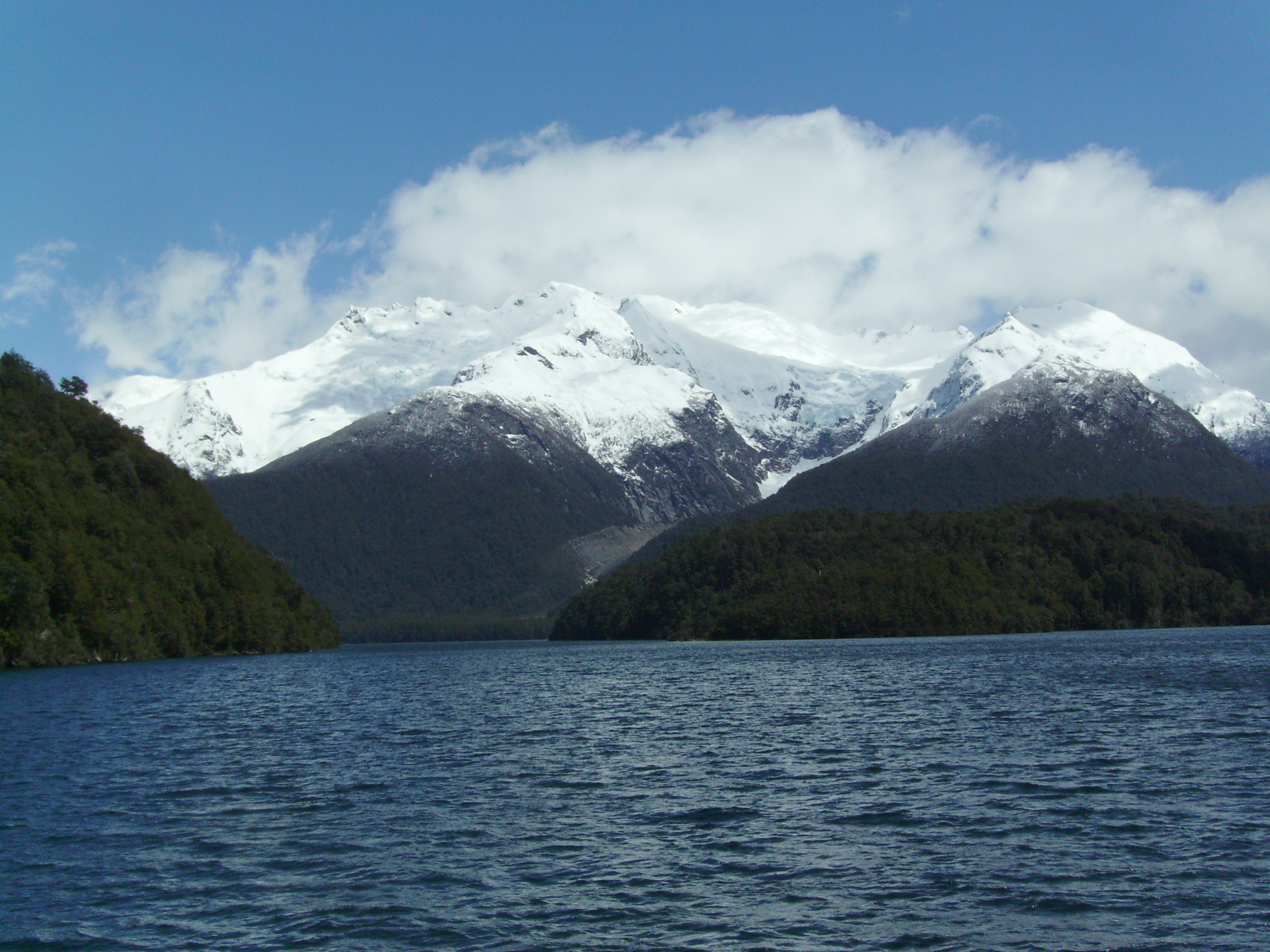
- Torrecillas Glacier and Menéndez Lake

- Location within Argentina
- Location: Chubut Province, Argentina,
- Coordinates: 42°41′S 71°50′W
- Lake type: glacial lake
- Primary inflows: Rio Los Alerces, Lake Cisne
- Primary outflows: Menéndez River
- Catchment area: 715 square kilometres (276 sq mi)
- Basin countries: Argentina
- Max. length: 26 kilometres (16 mi)
- Max. width: 2.8 kilometres (1.7 mi)
- Surface area: 55.7 km^{2} (13,800 acres)
- Average depth: 149.9 metres (492 ft)
- Max. depth: 287 metres (942 ft)
- Water volume: 8.31 cubic kilometres (6,740,000 acre⋅ft)
- Residence time: 2.8 years
- Surface elevation: 570 metres (1,870 ft)

Lake Menéndez (Lago Menéndez) is a large lake in Chubut Province, Argentina. Lake Menéndez is in the chain of lakes in the Futaleufú River system of Argentina which via Yelcho Lake and the Yelcho River flows into the Pacific Ocean in Chile. Located in the Andes, Lake Menendez is Y-shaped, of glacial origin, and occupies two narrow valleys between glaciated peaks. The lake is in the Los Alerces National Park. There are no roads or other developments near the lake. Travel is by boat or foot. Lake Menéndez is noted for the extensive Alerce (Fitzroya) forests near the tips of its two arms.

== Description ==
Lake Menéndez occupies the deepest lake trough, a narrow fjord-like valley, in Chubut Province. It was formed by the convergence of two glacial tongues. Near the middle of its 26 kilometres (16 mi) length the lake divides into two arms, running at right angles to each other, one continuing northwest, the other turning southwest. The two arms are separated by Mount Torrecillas which rises to 2,213 metres (7,260 ft) in elevation. The Torrecillas glacier descends to within a few hundred meters of the lake's shoreline. Flowing into Lake Menéndez are several small streams originating in the snowfields and glaciers along the border with Chile, 10 kilometres (6.2 mi) distant.

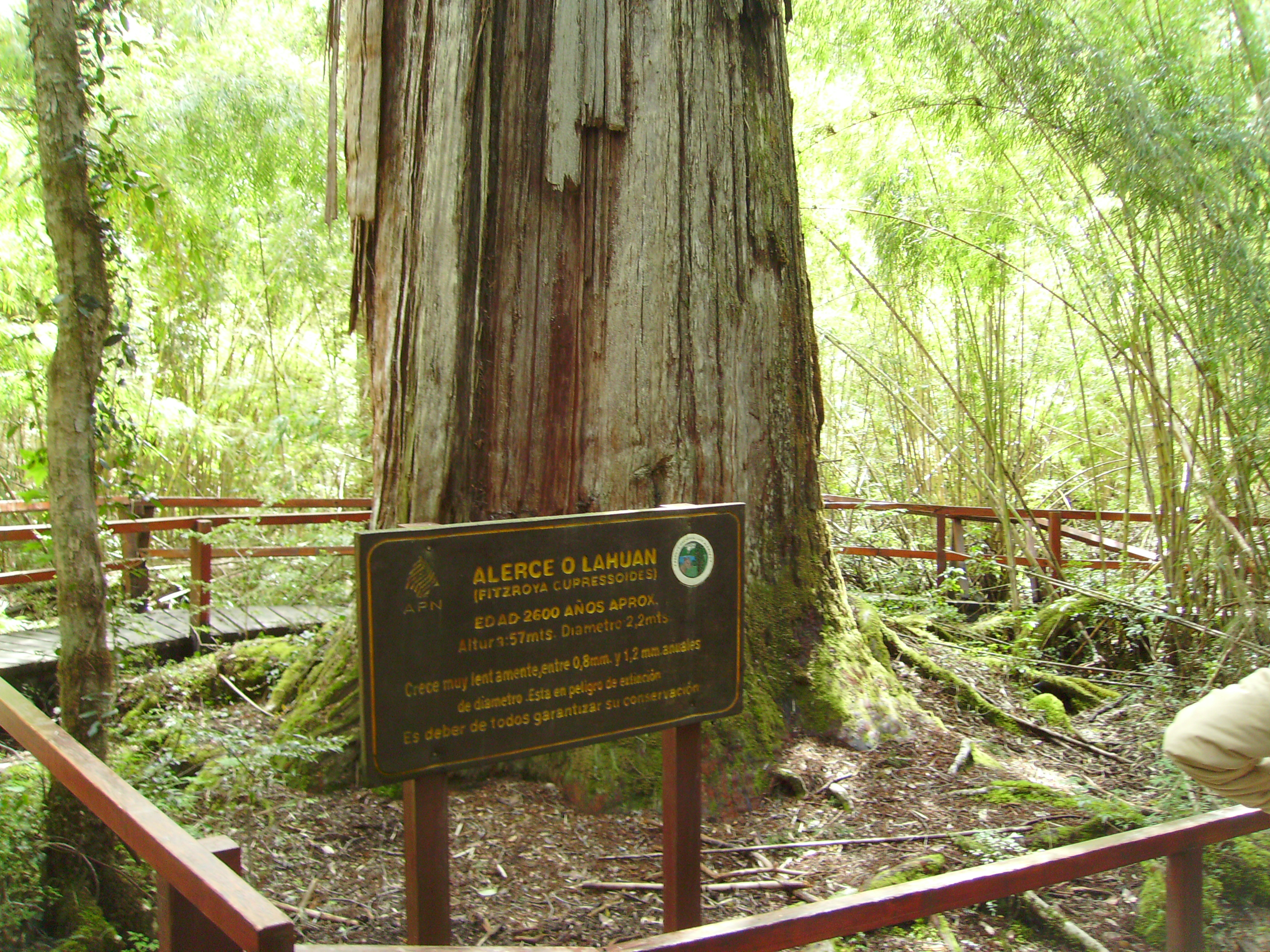
A 2,600 year old alerce tree near the shore of Lake Menéndez.

The most extensive forests of rare Alerce trees in Argentina are located at the tips of the two arms of Lake Menéndez. The largest known Alerce tree in Argentina is on the northwest arm near a boat pier called Puerto Sagrario. It is 57 metres (187 ft) tall, 2.2 metres (7.2 ft) in diameter, and 2,600 years old. Regular tours visit the Alerce forest. Taller and larger Alerce trees are believed to exist on the southwestern arm, but access to that area is restricted.

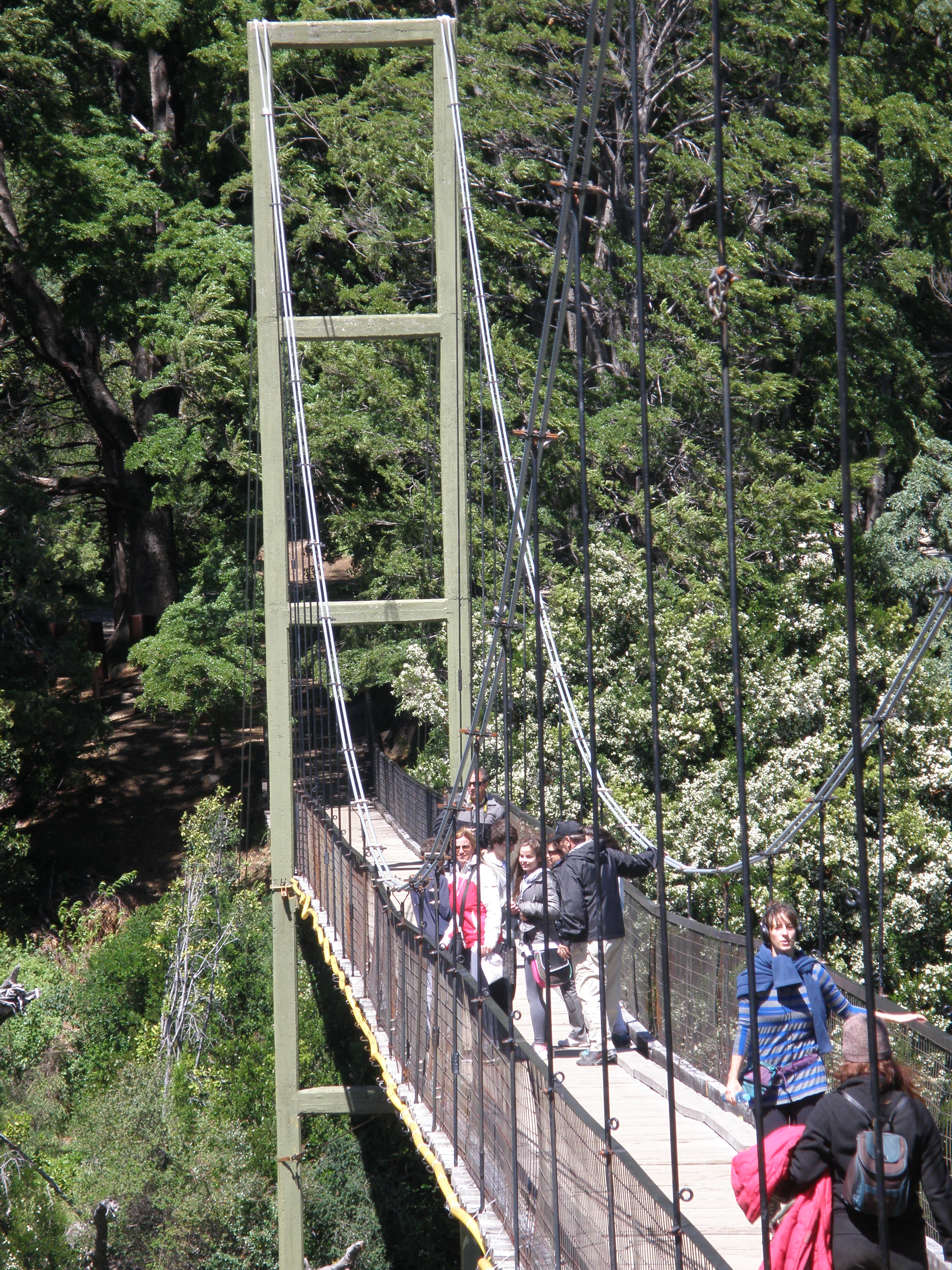
A footbridge across the Arrayanes River provides access to Lake Menéndez.

The shores of the lake are also forested by "cipres" (Austrocedrus chilensis) and "coihué" (Nothofagus dombeyi) among other species. The forest is representative of the Valdivian temperate rain forest ecosystem.

The frog Batrachyla fitzroya is only known from Isla Grande in Lake Menéndez. It is named after the Fitzroya (alerce) trees that are prominent at the locality.

The outlet of the lake, called the Menéndez River, flows for only 900 metres (3,000 ft), before joining the Arrayanes River with terminates in Futalaufquen Lake.

== Recreation ==
Overnight camping and campfires are not allowed near the lake. Access to some shore areas and tributary streams is prohibited. Fishing, especially for brown and rainbow trout, both introduced species, is popular.
