= Amutui Quimey Reservoir =

- Location within Argentina
- Location: Chubut Province
- Coordinates: 43°03′S 71°42′W
- Type: Reservoir
- Primary inflows: Frey, Stange, and Canelo Rivers
- Primary outflows: Futaleufú River
- Catchment area: 4,650 km^{2} (1,800 sq mi)
- Basin countries: Argentina
- Max. length: 38 kilometres (24 mi)
- Max. width: 3 kilometres (1.9 mi)
- Surface area: 86.7 square kilometres (21,400 acres)
- Average depth: 64.7 m (212 ft)
- Water volume: 8.37 cubic kilometres (6,790,000 acre⋅ft)
- Residence time: 1.02 years
- Surface elevation: 485 metres (1,591 ft)

Amutui Quimey Lake is a large reservoir in Chubut Province, Argentina. Amutui Quimey is in the chain of lakes of the Futaleufú River system of Argentina which via Yelcho Lake and the Yelcho River flows into the Pacific Ocean in Chile. The Futaleufú dam was completed and the reservoir filled in 1976 and the lake occupies a narrow valley between glaciated peaks. They hydroelectric facility produces 2600 gigawatt hours per year, most of which is used for an aluminum refinery in the city of Puerto Madryn. Amutui Quimey Lake is in the Andes within Los Alerces National Park. The name of the lake comes from the Mapuche language. It means "lost beauty", referring to the beauty of the valley before the lake.

No developments are permitted on the shoreline of Amutui Quimey Lake and visits are permitted during daylight hours only.

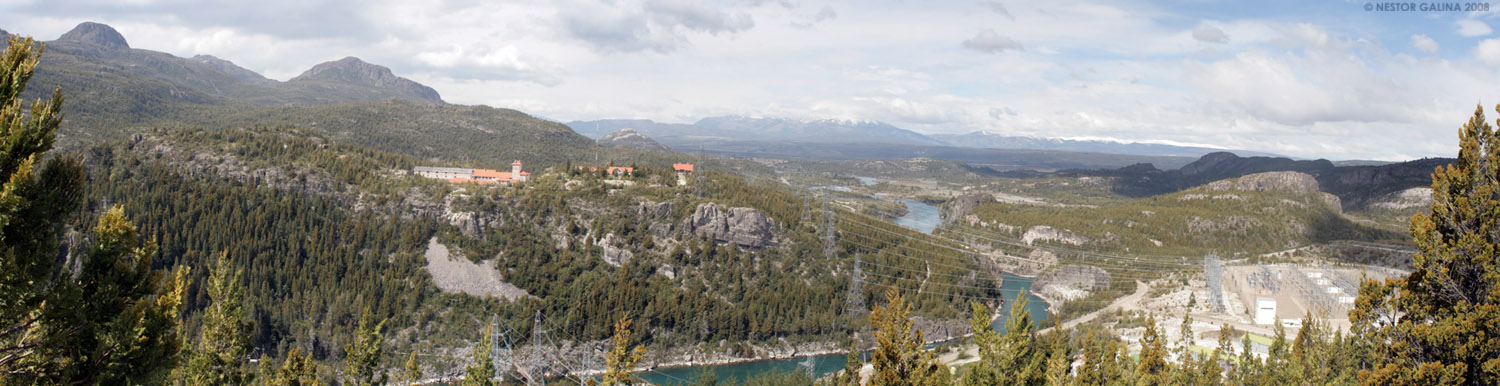
The Futaleufú Hydroelectric Complex below Amutui Quimey Reservoir

== Description ==
The Frey River flows about 7 kilometres (4.3 mi) from Kruger and Futalaufquen lakes to Amutui Quimey. The Frey is not accessible by road, but is often floated and is noted for trout fishing, scenery, and whitewater rapids. The river has a flow of 100 to 350 cubic meters per second (3,500 to 10,000 cubic feet per second) with class 3 and 4 rapids at low water and four-plus rapids at high water. The Situación Range rises on the east of the Frey River. Cerro Situación, the highest peak, reaches an altitude of 2,250 metres (7,380 ft) above sea level.

When impounded, the waters of Amutui Quimey covered four pre-existing lakes. Lake Situación was located at the junction of the Frey and Canelo Rivers. It was 14.5 square kilometres (3,600 acres) in size and had a maximum depth of 105 metres (344 ft). In the Canelo River drainage were lakes Quiñe (One), Epu (Two), and Cula (Three), 3.9 square kilometres (960 acres), 6.7 square kilometres (1,700 acres), and 14.7 square kilometres (3,600 acres) in size and 58 metres (190 ft), 119 metres (390 ft), and 245 metres (804 ft) deep respectively.

The outflow from the lake is the Futaleufu River which flows for a few miles through Argentina before entering Chile where it becomes a renowned whitewater river.
