= Batrachyla fitzroya =

Conservation status
- Vulnerable (IUCN 3.1)

Scientific classification
- Kingdom: Animalia
- Phylum: Chordata
- Class: Amphibia
- Order: Anura
- Family: Batrachylidae
- Genus: Batrachyla
- Species: B. fitzroya

Binomial name
- Batrachyla fitzroya Basso, 1994

Species of frog

Batrachyla fitzroya is a species of frog in the family Batrachylidae. It is endemic to Argentina and only known from its type locality, Isla Grande in Lake Menéndez, in the Los Alerces National Park, Chubut Province. The specific name fitzroya refers to Fitzroya cupressoides, a prominent tree at the type locality.

Batrachyla fitzroya is only known from Isla Grande in Lake Menéndez, Los Alerces National Park, Argentina

== Description ==
The type series consists of three males and two females measuring 28–35 mm (1.1–1.4 in) in snout–vent length; the holotype, an adult male, measures 31 mm (1.2 in). They eyes are inconspicuous. The tympanum is small, about half of the eye diameter. The snout is rounded in dorsal view and truncated in lateral view. The fingers and the toes are long; the fingers are free from webbing but the toes are basally webbed. The dorsum is brown with darker, diffuse blotches. There is a V-shaped inter-ocular band and concave supra-scapular bands. The limbs are cross-banded. The belly is unpigmented apart from some minute gray spots. Dorsal skin is smooth.

== Habitat and conservation ==
This species is classified as vulnerable by the IUCN and as "special value" by scientists within Argentina. The population is vulnerable to stochastic forces, fires, and volcanoes. Fast-moving boats on the lake can cause waves that disrupt the frog's breeding sites. Introduction of the American mink to the area may also pose a significant threat: Scientists from the IUCN believe that the frog could become critically endangered due to mink predation if effective measures are not taken.

The type locality is a very humid temperate Nothofagus-dominated forest at 500 m (1,600 ft) above sea level. Breeding habitat is unknown but could be small temporary pools. The species is locally common within its restricted range. Isla Grande is a highly protected area and entirely with the limits of the Los Alerces National Park.
