= Puerto Cárdenas =

- Interactive map of Puerto Cárdenas
- Coordinates: 43°10′35″S 72°25′49″W
- Region: Los Lagos
- Province: Palena
- Municipality: Chaitén
- Commune: Chaitén

Government
  - Type: Municipal
  - Alcade: José Miguel Fritis
- Elevation: 56 m (184 ft)

Population (2002 census )
  - Total: 21
- Time zone: UTC−04:00 (Chilean Standard)
  - Summer (DST): UTC−03:00 (Chilean Daylight)
- Area code: Country + town = 56 + 63

Puerto Cárdenas is a lakeside hamlet (Spanish: caserío) at the outflow of Yelcho Lake in Chaitén commune, southern Chile. Carretera Austral passes by the hamlet.
