= Cryptodepression =

Portion of a lake below sea level

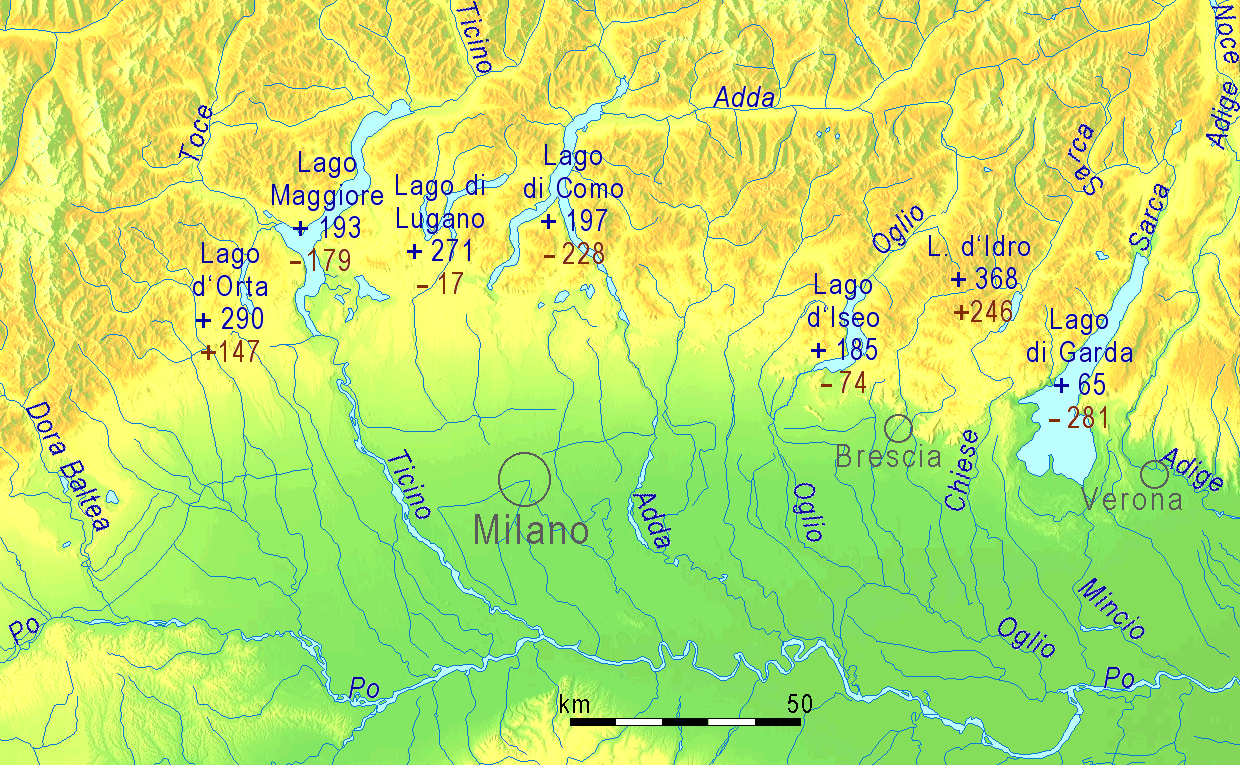
Prealpine lakes in Northern Italy by elevation (surface and deepest point elevation). Lake Maggiore, Lake Lugano, Lake Como and Lake Garda are cryptodepressions.

Cross-section diagram of the Italian lakes cryptodepressions

A cryptodepression is a depression in the Earth's surface that is below mean sea level, and which is filled by a lake.

== Etymology ==
The term is derived from the Ancient Greek word κρυπτός 'hidden' and depression.

== Description ==
A cryptodepression is often the result of a rift valley or a glaciation. Such lakes are often long and narrow, and the surrounding landscape and the shore of the lake can be very steep.

== Examples ==
Lago O'Higgins/San Martín has a surface elevation of 250 meters and a maximal depth of 836 meters, yielding a cryptodepression of 586 meters.

- Glacial lakes and moraine-dammed lakes: major prealpine lakes in Italy have cryptodepressions created by erosion. In other parts of the Alps, Swiss, Bavarian and Austrian lakes, cryptodepressions are not found because the lakes have significantly higher elevations. Glacial lakes creating cryptodepressions also occur in Norway, Chile, Argentina, Newfoundland, New Zealand, and Scotland. In North America, four of the five Great Lakes (all except Erie) and two of the Finger Lakes in New York, Cayuga Lake and Seneca Lake, are examples of cryptodepressions. Mälaren in Sweden was created by a different process; it had been an arm of the Baltic Sea as recently as the Viking Age before being cut off from the sea by post-glacial rebound.
- Rift valleys: the deepest known cryptodepression on Earth is in Lake Baikal (–1200 m). Other notable examples include Lake Tanganyika and Lake Malawi in Africa's East African Rift.
