= Los Alerces National Park =

National park in Argentina

- Parque Nacional Los Alerces
- IUCN category II (national park)
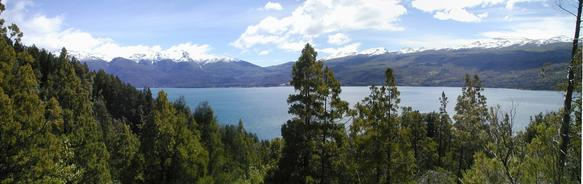
- Lake Futalaufquen, one of the many lakes in the Los Alerces National Park.

- Location within Argentina
- Location: Chubut Province, Argentina
- Coordinates: 42°48′27″S 71°53′56″W
- Area: 2,599 km^{2} (1,003 sq mi)
- Established: 1937
- Governing body: Administración de Parques Nacionales

UNESCO World Heritage Site
- Type: Natural
- Criteria: vii, x
- Designated: 2017 (41st session)
- Reference no.: 1526
- Region: Latin America

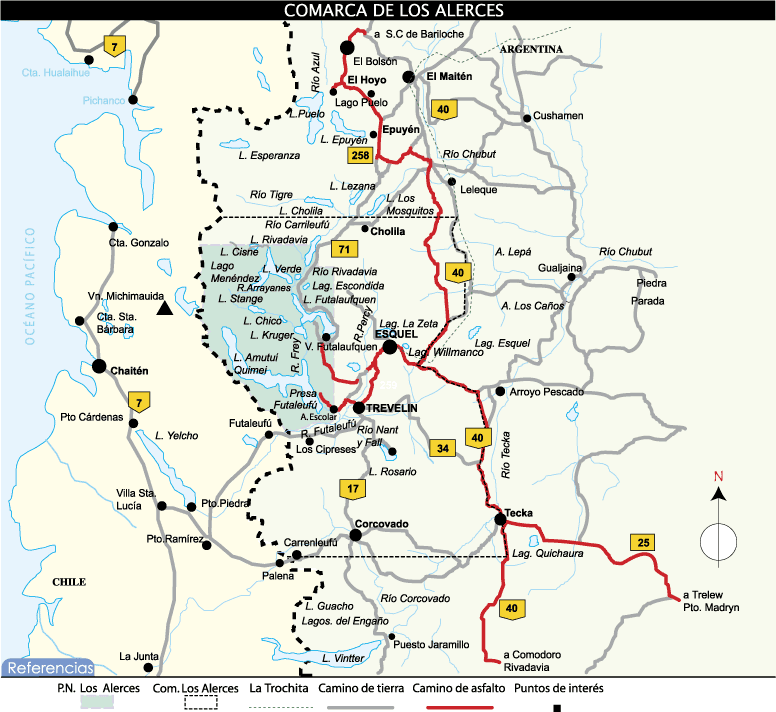
Los Alerces National Park in Argentina.

Los Alerces National Park (Spanish: Parque Nacional Los Alerces) is located in the Andes in Chubut Province in the Patagonian region of Argentina. Its western boundary coincides with the Chilean border. Successive glaciations have molded the landscape in the region creating spectacular features such as moraines, glacial cirques and clear-water lakes. The vegetation is dominated by dense temperate forests, which give way to alpine meadows higher up under the rocky Andean peaks. A highly distinctive and emblematic feature is its alerce forest; the globally threatened alerce tree is the second longest living tree species in the world (>3,600 years). The alerce forests in the park are in an excellent state of conservation. The property is vital for the protection of some of the last portions of continuous Patagonian Forest in an almost pristine state and is the habitat for a number of endemic and threatened species of flora and fauna.

== Alerce trees ==
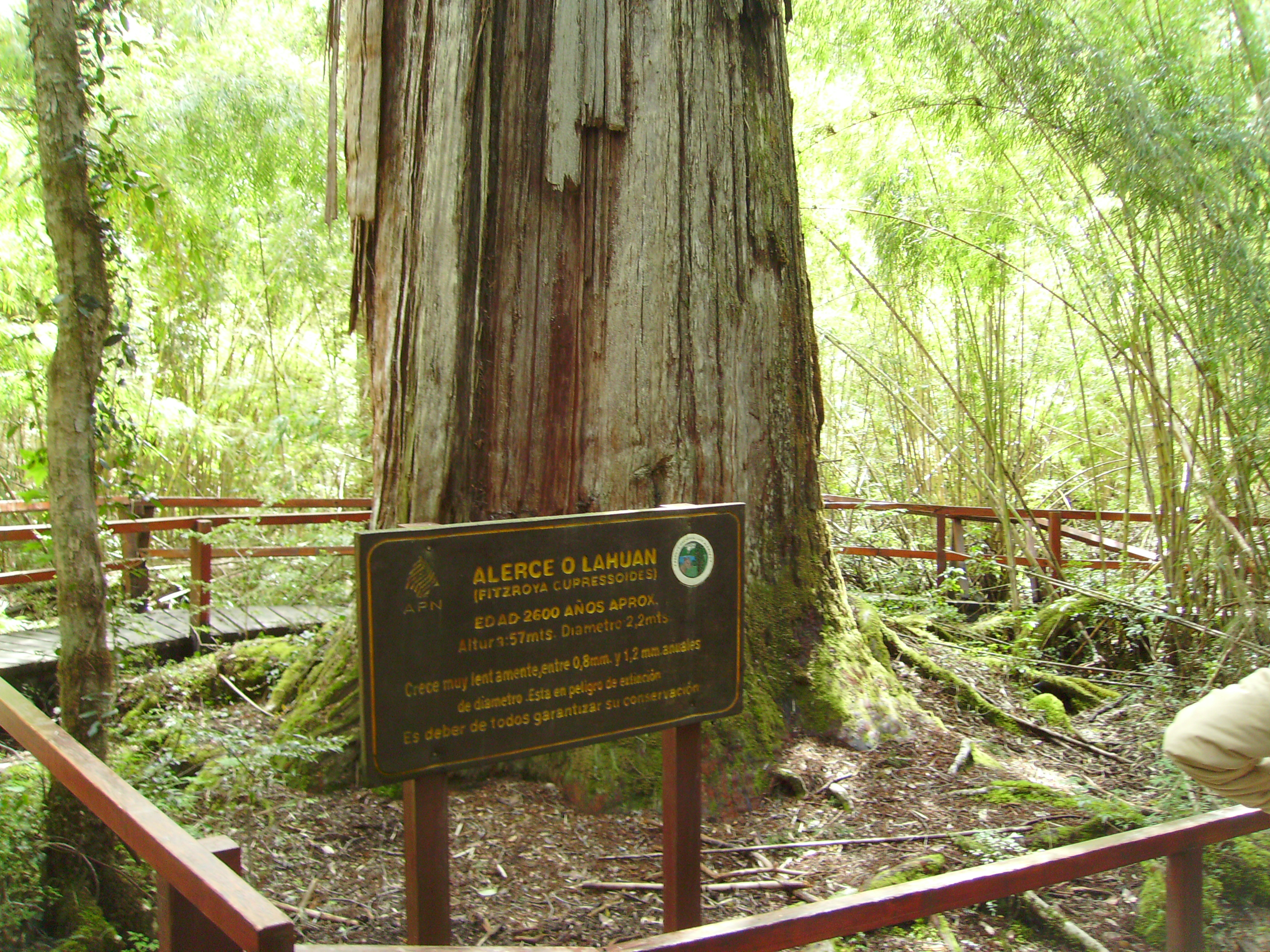
An alerce tree near Lake Menéndez.

Designated a World Heritage Site in 2017, the park was created in 1937 to protect forests of alerce trees, called lahuán by the Mapuche people, and other examples of the flora of the Patagonian Andes. The National Park has the largest alerce forest in Argentina. Alerce is often compared in appearance to the Sequoia trees of the United States, reaching a very large size. It is one of the longest-living trees in the world; some in Chile are 3,600 years old. The alerce grows very slowly and belongs to the family Cupressaceae (cypresses). The alerce is restricted to a small range in Chile and Argentina and the species is endangered due to exploitation of the tree for lumber.

The best-known alerce forest in the park, reachable by boat and often visited by tourists, is at a boat dock called Puerto Sagrario at the northern end of Lake Menéndez. The largest known alerce tree in Argentina is located there. It is 57 metres (187 ft) tall, 2.2 metres (7.2 ft) in diameter, and 2,600 years old. Regular tours visit the forest. Taller and larger alerce trees are believed to exist on the southwestern arm of Lake Menéndez, but access to that area is restricted.

The virgin alerce forests in the park cover an area of 7,407 hectares (18,300 acres) on the two arms of Lake Menéndez and the upper part of Amutui Quimey Reservoir, and along the streams feeding into those lakes.

== Description ==
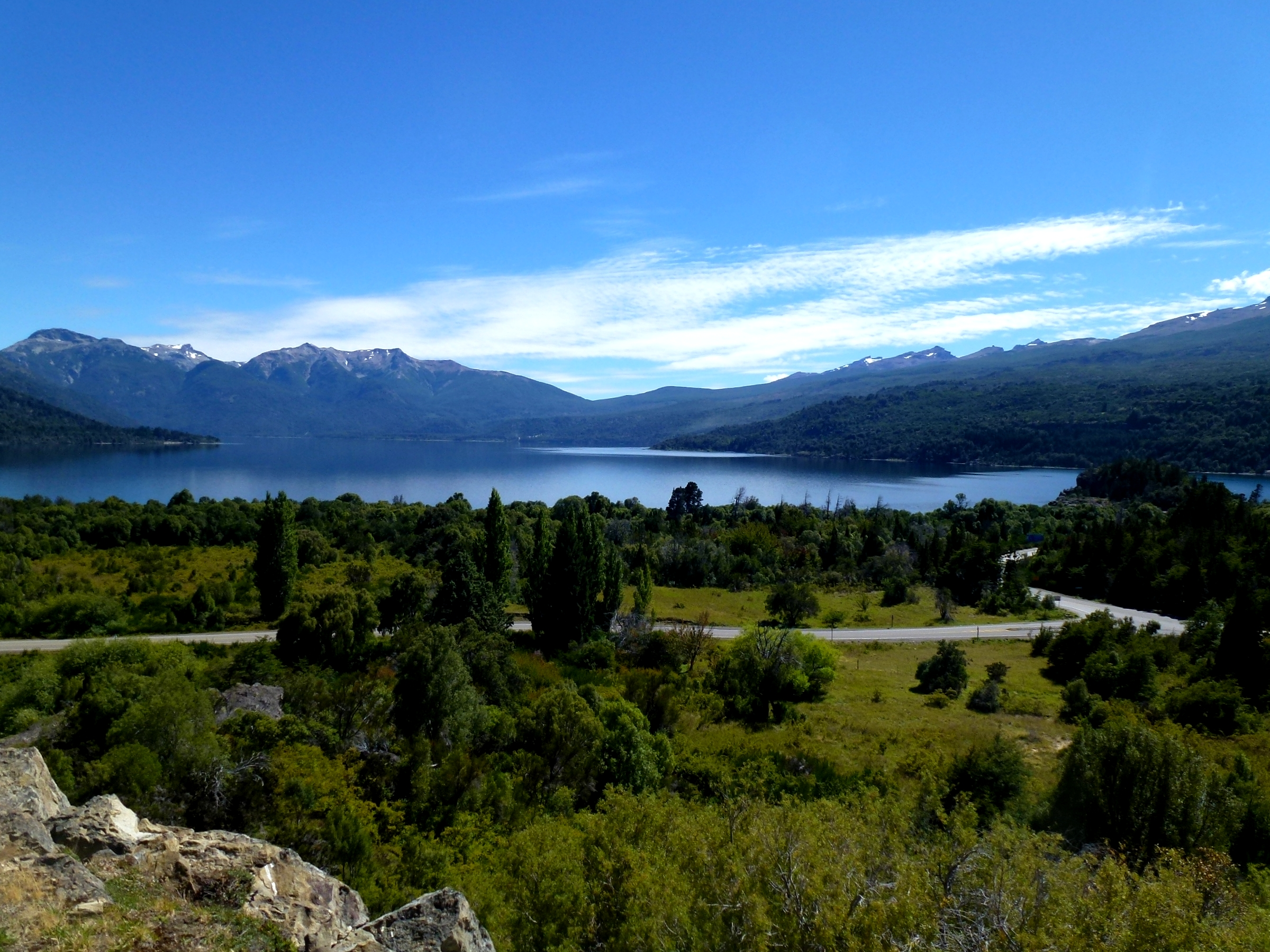
A highway runs along the eastern shore of Futalaufquen Lake giving tourist access to the park.

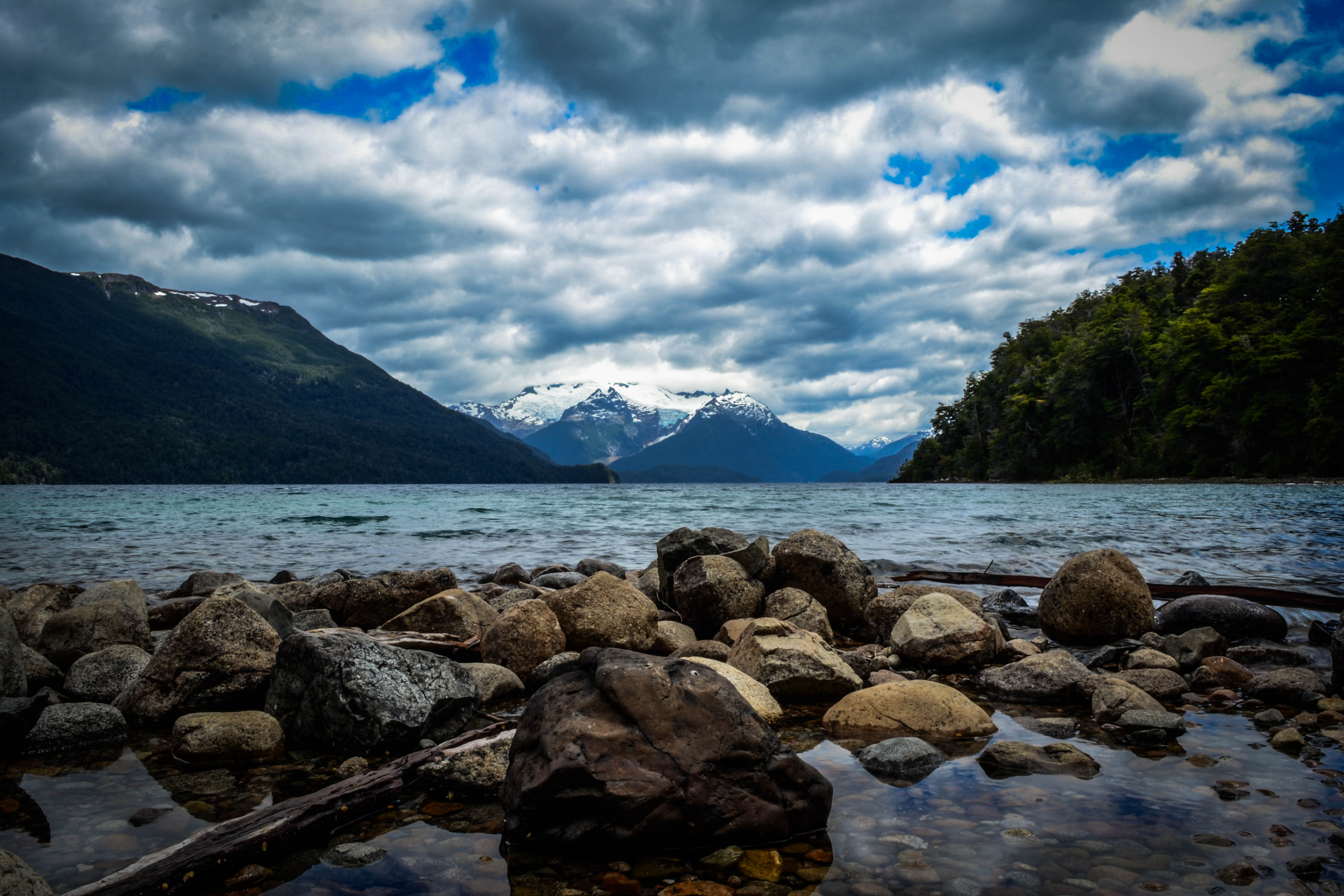
Lake Menéndez and Torrecillas Glacier.

Los Alerces National Park consists of two parts: the formally declared national park of 187,379 hectares (723.47 sq mi) and the adjoining Los Alerces National Reserve of 71,443 hectares (275.84 sq mi). Almost all the development in the park is in the national reserve. A buffer area 10 kilometres (6.2 mi) wide surrounds the three sides of the park which do not border on Chile.

Los Alerces National Park is shaped like a rough rectangle, extending approximately 65 kilometres (40 mi) north to south along the border with Chile and 45 kilometres (28 mi) east to west. All of Los Alerces National Park is in the drainage basin of the Futaleufú River, although the river is called by several different names during its course in Argentina. A chain of lakes separated by short courses of turbulent river characterize the park. Lake Rivadavia is the beginning of the chain. The outflow from Lake Rivadavia is called the Rivadavia River which flows into the much smaller Green Lake. The outlet from Green Lake is called the Arrayanes River, which after receiving the outflow from Lake Menéndez continues on to Futalaufquen Lake. Below Futalaufquen Lake is Kruger Lake and the Frey River which flows into Amutui Quimey Reservoir, an artificial lake. The river known as the Futaleufú emerges below Amutui Quimey reservoir and becomes the southern boundary of the National Park. Scattered around the mountains and valleys of the park are a number of smaller lakes and streams.

The highest point in the Los Alerces National Park is Cordon de las Pirámides, 2,440 metres (8,010 ft) in elevation. The lowest point in the park is about 330 metres (1,080 ft) where the Futaleufú river crosses into Chile. The tree line is about 1,400 metres (4,600 ft). Higher than that is sparse vegetation, bare rock, and permanent or semi-permanent snowfields. Torrecillas glacier is between the two arms of Lake Menėnendez.

== Climate ==
The lower elevations in Los Alerces National Park are classified as Oceanic climates, denominated Cfb, or humid continental climates, Dfb, in the Köppen climate classification system. Moisture-laden clouds from the Pacific Ocean strike the Andes on the Chilean-Argentine border and produce up to 3,000 millimetres (120 in) of precipitation annually, mostly in the form of rain at lower elevations and snow at higher elevations. Eastward from the crest of the Andes, in a rain shadow, precipitation decreases rapidly, falling to about 800 millimetres (31 in) at the eastern edge of the park. Temperatures in the park range from cold to moderate. Freezes can occur in any month of the year. At the park headquarters at one of the lowest elevations in the park, the warmest month is January with average daily maximum and minimum temperatures of 24° celsius (75° fahrenheit) and 8° celsius (46° fahrenheit). The average temperatures in July, the coldest month, are 7° (45° fahrenheit) high and -1° (30° fahrenheit) low. Temperatures decline with increasing elevation. Average temperatures decline with altitude.

In the west of the park, there is high rainfall and Valdivian temperate rain forests below the higher elevations of the Andes. Much of the rest of the park is Patagonian forest similar to the Lanín and Nahuel Huapi National Parks, with coihues and lenga. Arrayán (Luma apiculata) trees can be seen along the Arrayanes river.

Although there is no true dry season, precipitation is heaviest in the southern hemisphere winter months of July through August.

== Development and tourism ==
A hydroelectric dam, providing energy to industry in Puerto Madryn, has created the large Amutui Quimey Reservoir, which empties into the Futaleufú River which flows on to Chile.

There is good walking and fishing in the park, and boat trips on the lakes. The Torrecillas glacier can be seen from tour boats on Lake Menéndez.

== See also ==
- Lake Menéndez
- Lake Rivadavia
