= Laguna de Guayatayoc =

- Location within Argentina
- Location: Cochinoca Department, Jujuy Province, Argentina
- Coordinates: 23.4167°S 65.85°W
- Type: body of salty water
- Surface area: 240 km^{2} (93 sq mi)
- Average depth: 6 m (20 ft)

Laguna de Guayatayoc is a body of salty water in Argentina, located in the south of the Cochinoca Department, in the province of Jujuy.

The lake is almost united with the Salinas Grandes. Its surface area is highly variable, depending on the season and longer cycles of drought and humidity. In the puna ecoregion, summer (December–March) is the rainy season; hence the lake is largest in March and April. It covers an area of approximately 240 square kilometres (93 sq mi) and is about 6 metres (20 ft) deep.

== Fauna ==
Laguna de Guayatayoc is home to large populations of different varieties of flamingos, including James's flamingos, Andean flamingos and Chilean flamingos.

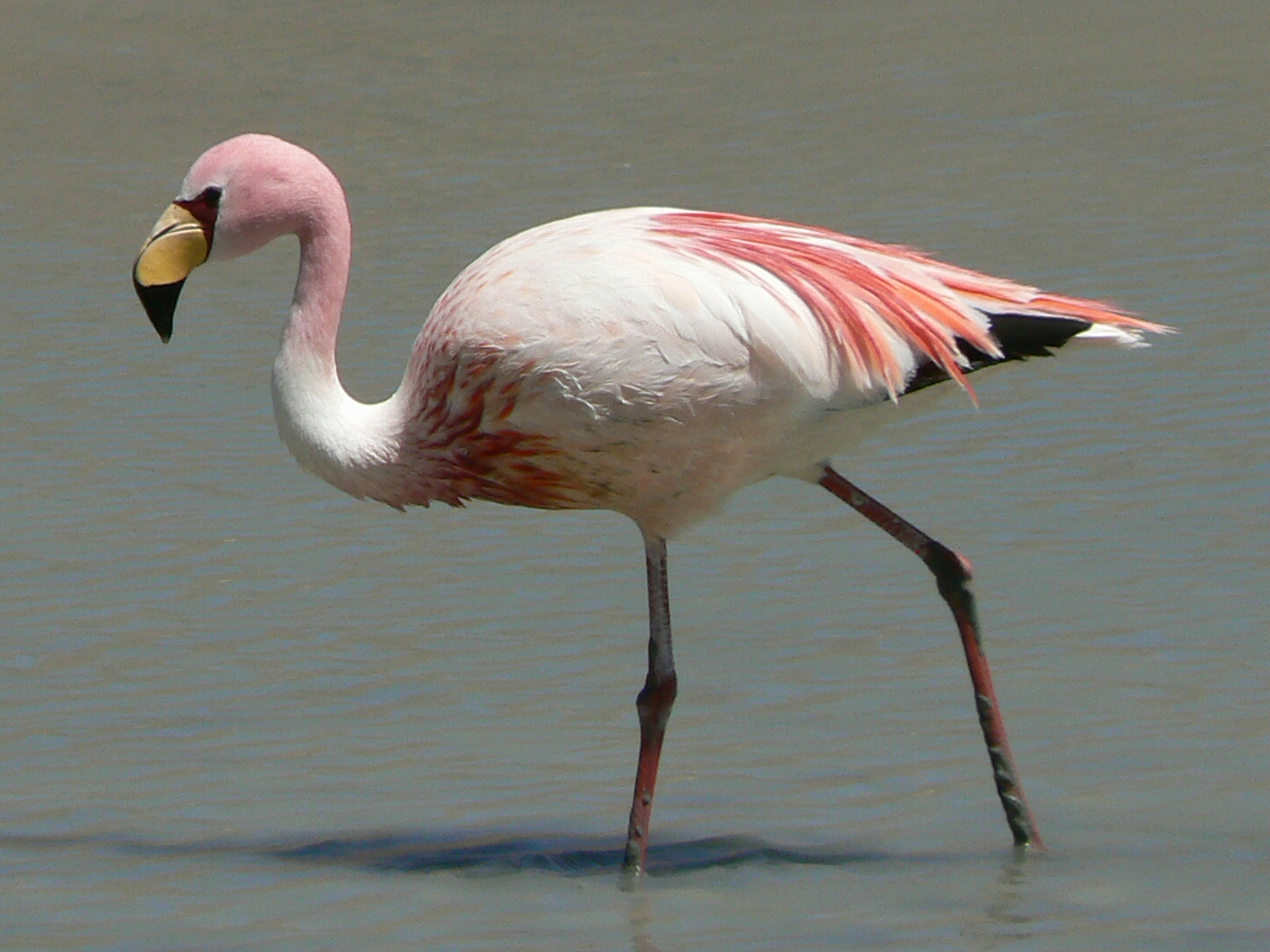
James's flamingo

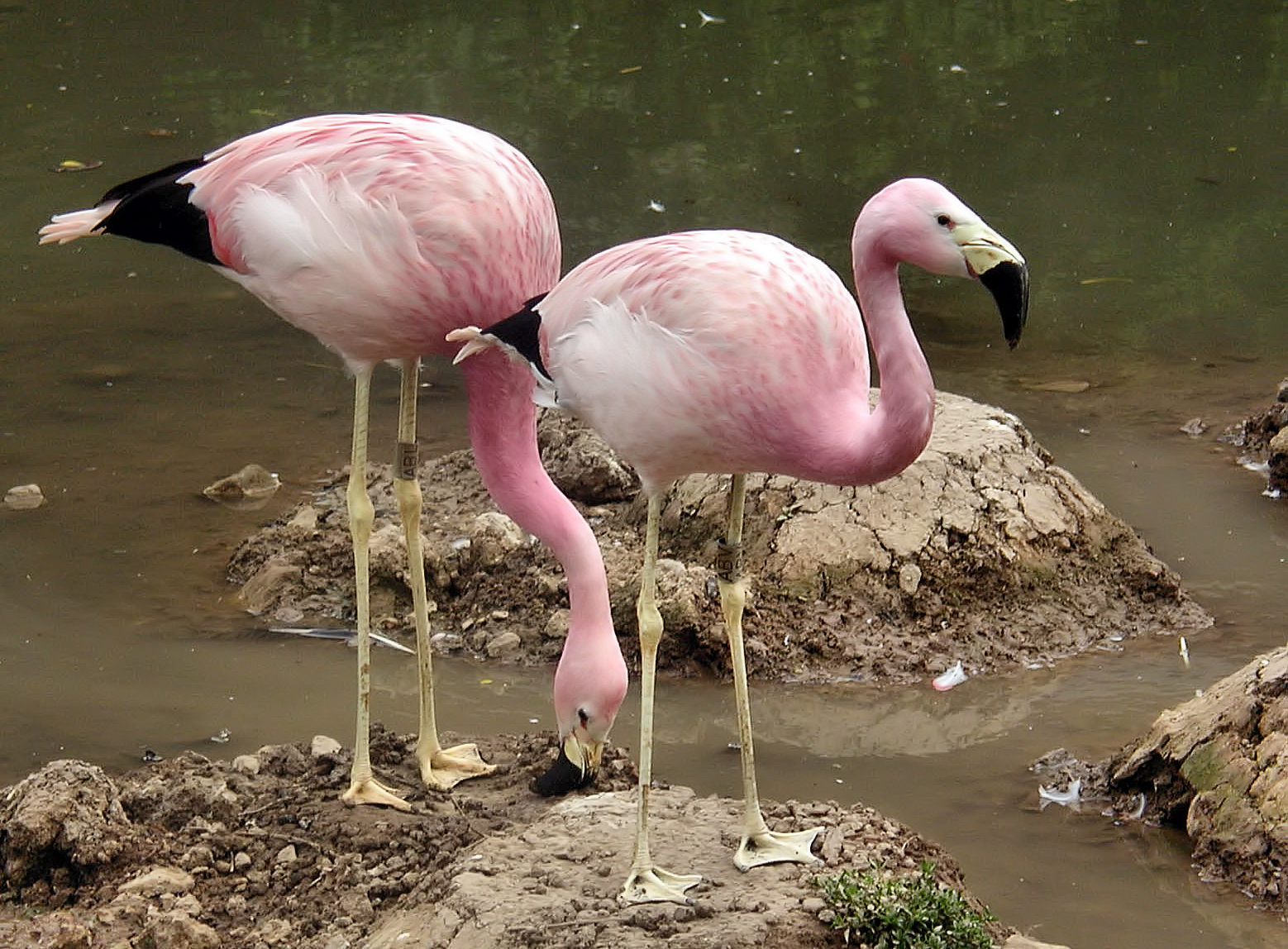
Andean flamingo

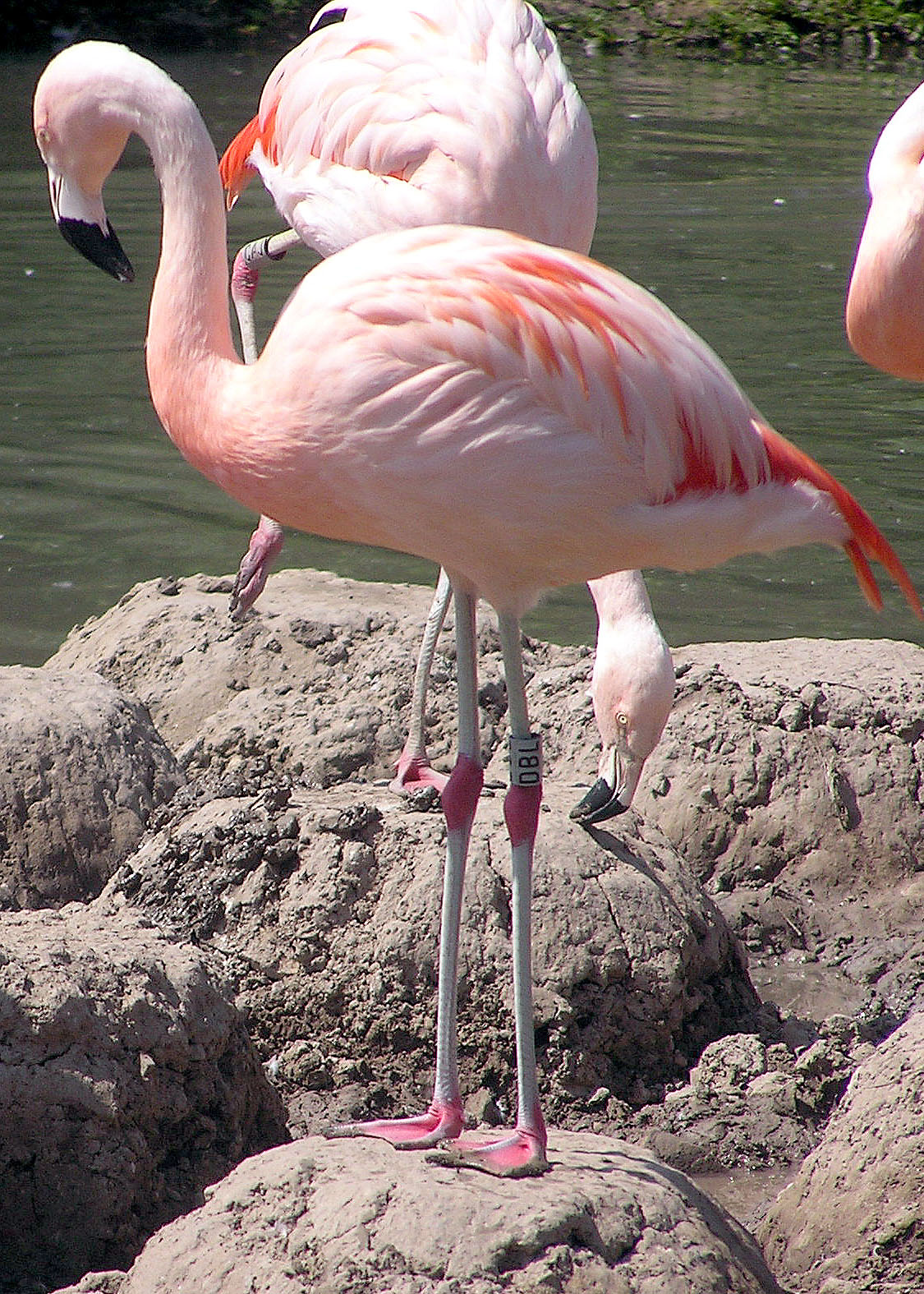
Chilean flamingo
