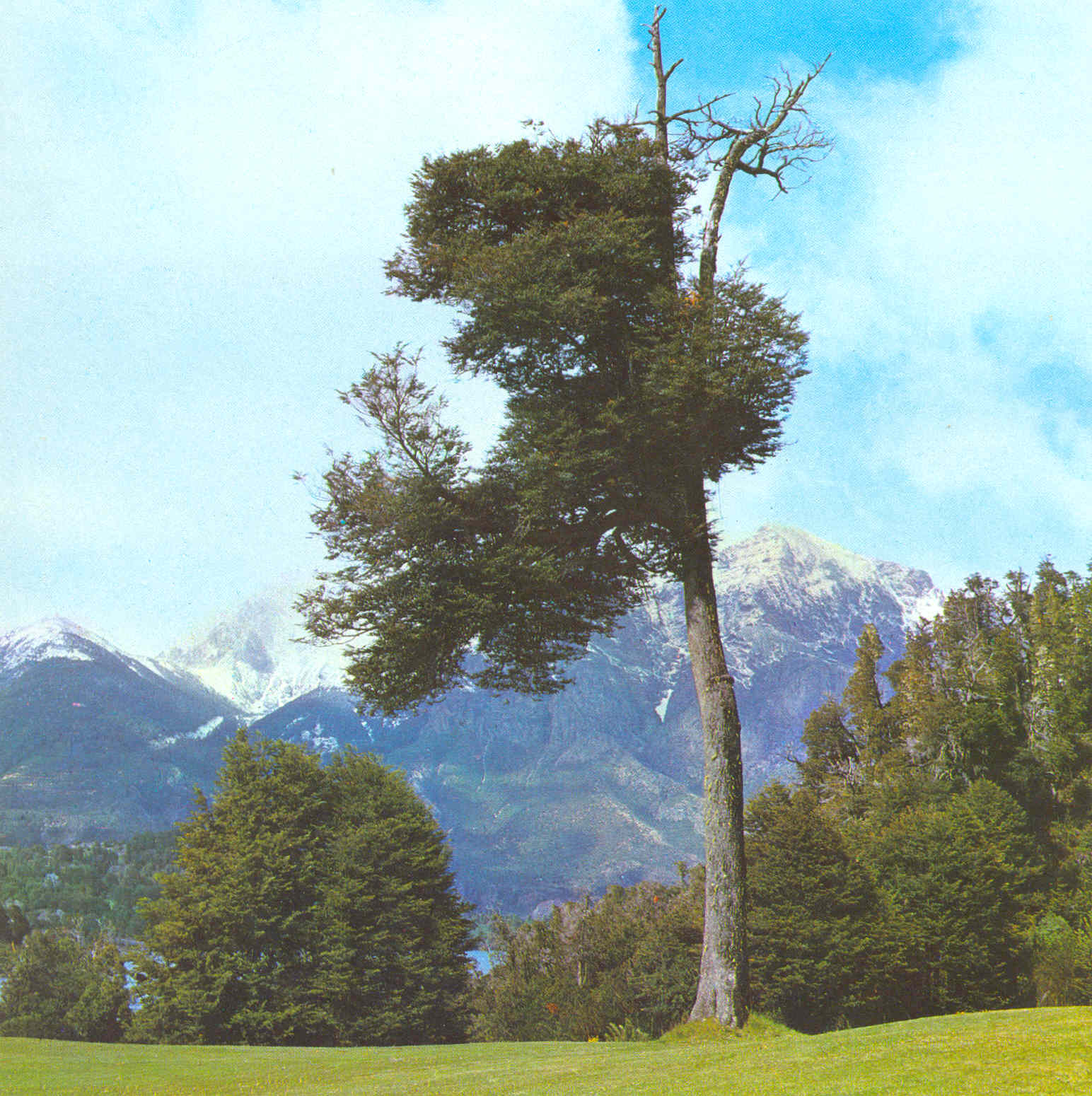

Conservation status
- Least Concern (IUCN 3.1)

Scientific classification
- Kingdom: Plantae
- Clade: Embryophytes
- Clade: Tracheophytes
- Clade: Spermatophytes
- Clade: Angiosperms
- Clade: Eudicots
- Clade: Rosids
- Order: Fagales
- Family: Nothofagaceae
- Genus: Nothofagus
- Subgenus: Nothofagus subg. Nothofagus
- Species: N. dombeyi

Binomial name
- Nothofagus dombeyi (Mirb.) Oerst.

Synonyms
- Fagus dombeyi Mirb.

= Nothofagus dombeyi =

Species of plant

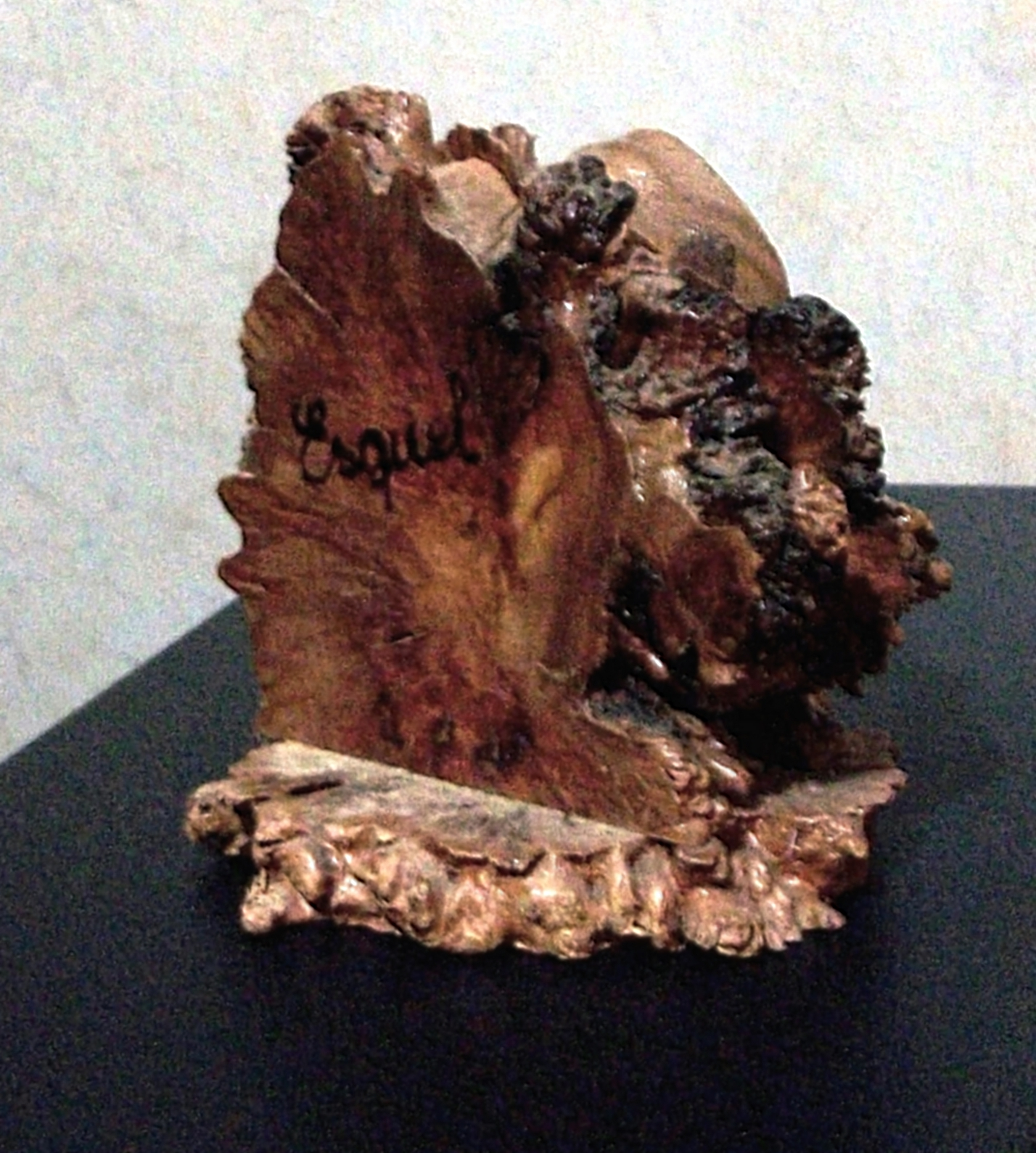
An ornamental clipboard made of Nothofagus dombeyi heartwood

Nothofagus dombeyi, Dombey's beech, coigue, coihue or coigüe (from Mapudungun koywe) is a tree species native to southern Chile and the Andean parts of Argentine Patagonia. It is a fast-growing species that can live in a wide range of climatic conditions, and forms dense forests. It is cultivated for its timber, and as an ornamental subject.

The shadow produced by stands of Nothofagus dombeyi is an important factor that keeps the air around streams cool and with relatively low daily temperature variations.

== Description ==
It can become a large tree, up to 45 m (148 ft) high and 1.9 m (6.2 ft) in diameter. One tree, felled by a storm in 1954, reportedly measured 2.55 m (8.4 ft) in diameter at the height of a man's chest and a total volume, including the branches, of 87 m³.

The coihue usually has elegant branches which are flattened horizontally. The leaves are evergreen, small (25–40 mm long and 10–16 mm wide), thick, coriaceous (leathery) and lustrous, dark green, with toothed borders and an acute apex; they have a very small, rounded and rhomb-shaped petiole. The tree is hermaphroditic; male and female flowers are grouped in the same tree, and pollen is spread by wind action. The flowers, measuring less than 5 mm, are insignificant. The fruit is a triangular nut measuring about 4–7 mm.

== Etymology ==
The name of the tree is often spelled coigüe (reflecting the common Spanish pronunciation with an epenthetic g). Other related trees named coihue are the Coihue de Magallanes (Nothofagus betuloides), and the Coihue de Chiloé (Nothofagus nitida).

The Latin specific epithet dombeyi honours the French botanist Joseph Dombey (1742-1794).

== Distribution and habitat ==
Nothofagus dombeyi is found from 35 to 45° South latitude between 700 and 1,200 m (2,300 and 3,900 ft) above mean sea level. It forms dense forests such as those found in the Los Alerces and Nahuel Huapi national parks. It thrives in low hills with gentle slopes, being very demanding of water and soil; the largest forests are found on south-facing slopes, and the healthier specimens tend to grow on the banks of rivers and lakes. It sometimes forms mixed forests with Araucaria araucana (monkey-puzzle) trees, for example in the Villarrica National Park in Chile.

== Uses ==
Coihue timber is considered excellent. In Argentina its exploitation is limited by the presence of the best forests within national parks. The wood is bright grayish white; the heartwood is a pale pink-white, which darkens after cut. Its texture is very fine and makes it easy to work with. It has a beautiful engraving, is semi-heavy, hard, durable and decay resistant. It is used in furniture, barrels, floors and building.

Nothofagus dombeyi has been introduced as an ornamental tree for parks and large gardens in the British Isles where it has gained the Royal Horticultural Society's Award of Garden Merit. It has also been introduced to the North Pacific Coast of the United States. It requires an acid pH soil which is fertile and reliably moist. Young plants need shelter from cold winds; however mature specimens are hardy down to −15 °C (5 °F).

== Gallery ==
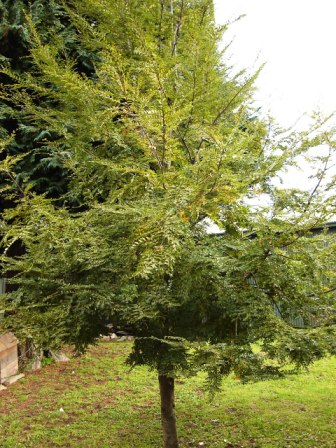
Young tree

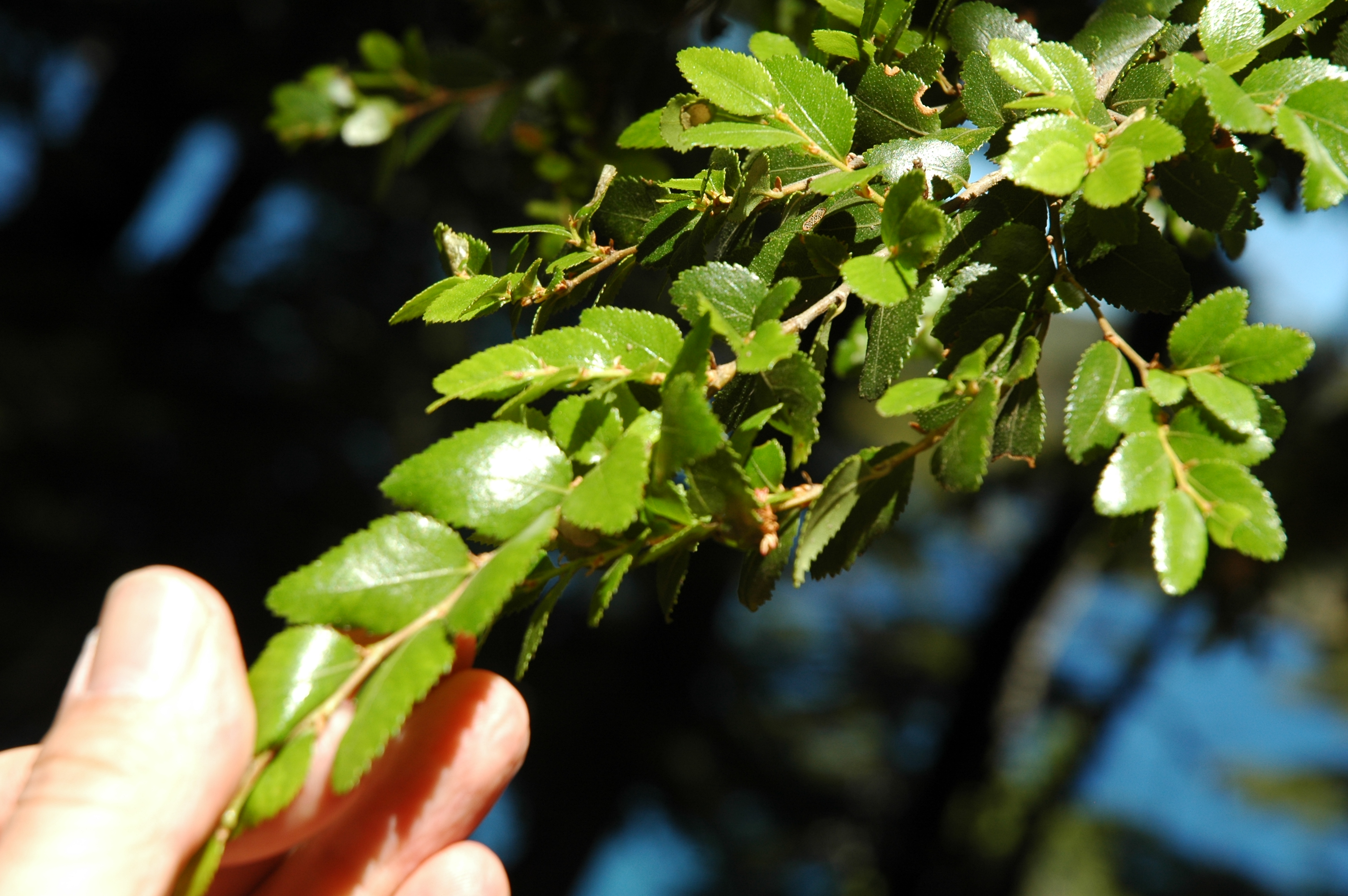
Leaves
