= Futaleufú River =

Coordinates: 43.41°S 72.09°W

Rio Futaleufú Afon Fawr
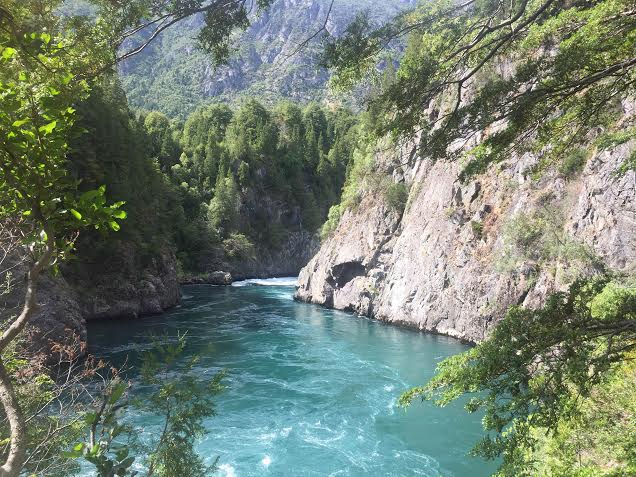
- Entrance to Infierno Canyon on the Futaleufu

Location
- Countries: Argentina; Chile

Physical characteristics
- Source
  - location: Chubut Province, Argentina
- Mouth
  - location: Yelcho Lake, Chile
- Length: 105 km (65 mi)

The Futaleufú River, located in northern Patagonia, is one of two rivers that cross the 5,308 kilometres (3,298 mi) Argentina–Chile border. Its headwaters can be found in the glacial snow melt of the UNESCO protected Los Alerces National Park in Argentina. The river gorge drops as low as 1,700 metres (5,600 ft) below the surrounding glaciated peaks. The name Futaleufú is an indigenous Mapuche word meaning "Big River". Locals refer to the valley as "un paisaje pintado por Dios" — a landscape painted by God.

== Geography ==
The Futaleufú River is fed by a chain of lakes in the Los Alerces National Park in Chubut Province, Argentina. The name, Futaleufú, is given to the river below the Futaleufú Dam and Amutui Quimey Reservoir. The watershed drains the Southern Andes Mountains from Argentina into Chile and drains into Yelcho Lake. From this point the river is renamed Rio Yelcho and continues to its mouth at the Pacific Ocean. From its source in Argentina, the river flows 35 kilometres (22 mi) to the Chilean border and enters the Palena Province, in Los Lagos (X) Region. Whitewater enthusiasts generally paddle the Chilean side of the river.

During its course through Chile, the Futaleufú River has three major tributaries, the Rio Chico, the Rio Espolon, and the Rio Azul. All three major tributaries of the "Futa" can be rafted or kayaked in season, with the exception of a gorge on the Espolon called "The Devil's Throat". The Futaleufú watershed also includes several lakes including Lago Espolon, Lago Lonconao, and Lago Pinilla.

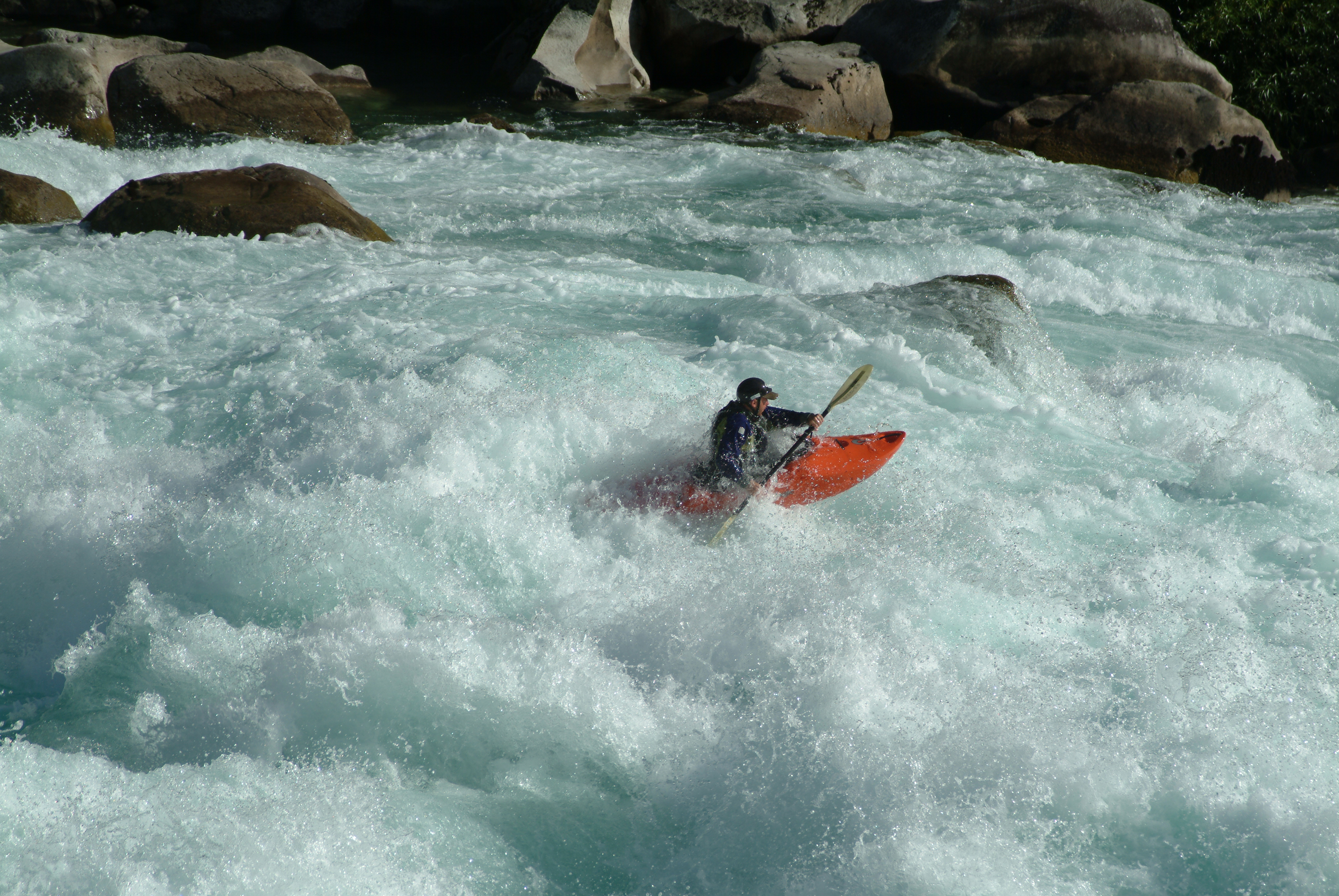
A kayaker runs a rapid on the Futaleufú River on Chile.

== Recreation ==
The Futaleufú (The 'Fu' or ‘Futa’ for short) is known for its turquoise waters, a phenomenon produced by glacial till. Every summer, the town of Futaleufú stages an annual river festival called "Futafest". The Futaleufú and its tributary streams and lakes are also destinations for fly fishing.

The Futaleufú was first kayaked in January 1985 by Mark Allen, Phil DeReimer, Lars Holbek & Eric Magneson.

The first raft descent was attempted in 1985 by a group led by Steve Curry. The first successful raft descent was in 1991, when a group led by Eric Hertz and Chris Spelius were able to complete the entire whitewater section of the river.

=== Rapids ===
The internationally acclaimed rapids are on the Chilean side of the river. Paddlers describe the Chilean side of the Futaleufú in four distinct sections—the Upper, Middle, Lower, El Macal whitewater (Bottom), and El Macal flatwater. Rapids range in difficulty from Class II to Class V+ on the International Scale of River Difficulty, and each section offers a unique spread of difficulty. The most difficult and dangerous is the upper section, 22 kilometres (14 mi), containing 6 class V rapids and the highly continuous “Wild Mile” class IV section. The middle 7 kilometres (4 mi) contains what many consider to be the longest and most technical rapid on the river, Terminator (class V+), along with several other difficult class IV rapids. Because most of these are conducive to avoiding or portaging, however, the middle section less demanding than the upper. The lower section, 13 kilometres (8 mi), is very popular for its high-quality, continuous, class IV big water rapids, and a few class Vs. El Macal is popular with beginner paddlers for its class III rapids in the upper section, 4 kilometres (2.5 mi), which are a safer introduction to the Futaleufú's big water, and for its lower flatwater section, also 4 kilometres (2.5 mi).

== Dams ==
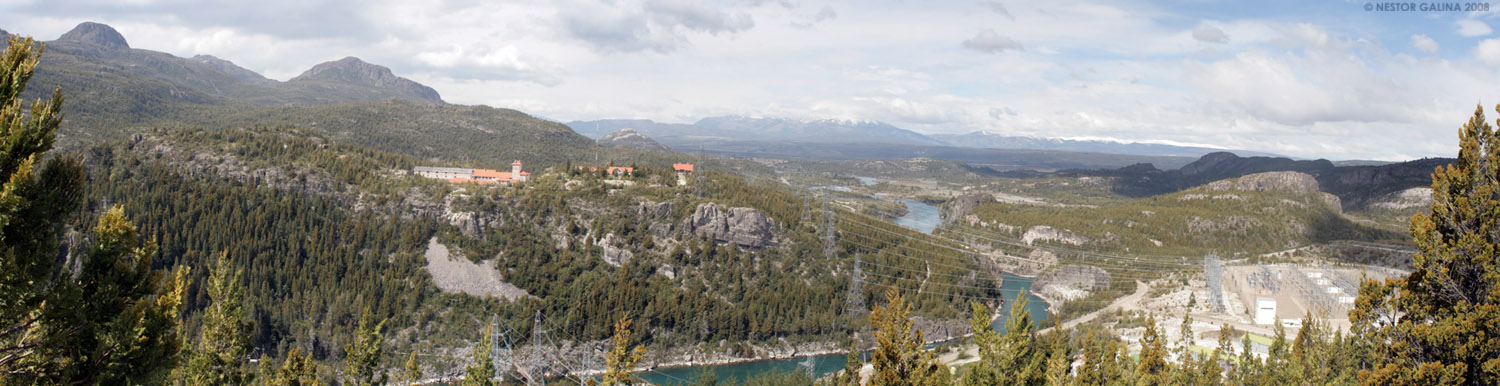
Hydroelectric Complex Futaleufu Argentina built in 1976

Currently, the Futaleufú is dammed once near its source in Argentina and is free flowing through Chile. The Futaleufú Hydroelectric Complex in Argentina, also known as Dam Amutui Quimey, is a 120-metre (390 ft) high embankment dam with 472 megawatt generation capacity that was finished in 1978. Amutui Quimey lake, the reservoir behind the dam, is now in place of what used to be three natural glacial lakes. After leaving the dam, the Futaleufú is free flowing for the remainder of its 105-kilometre (65 mi) journey until Yelcho Lake.

The multinational corporation Endesa proposed a large-scale hydroelectric project on the Chilean side of the Futaleufú watershed. The Endesa proposal would have built three dams, quelling the river's free flow and covering many of the rapids with a series of reservoirs. Several Chilean as well as international non-profit organizations joined forces to fight the dam project and protect the natural areas and communities of the Futaleufú watershed, regarding the area as an international treasure. In October 2014, citing international opposition, Endesa removed the Futaleufú from its list of future projects.

Chile's extensively privatized economy has allowed Endesa to purchase water rights throughout the country—effectively owning a portion of the Futaleufú's water to use at its discretion. In addition, mining companies have filed claims to extract mineral deposits beneath and surrounding the Futaleufú. Any such large-scale development project, hydroelectric or mining, is subject to an environmental impact assessment and permitting by the Chilean government, which retains power to override ownership rights in the face of unacceptable impact or risk. This legal tool has been used to halt projects elsewhere in the past, but the policy implications of a would-be impact assessment in the Futaleufú watershed remain unclear.

In 2025 the Government of Chile has officially declared the Futaleufú River as well as the Puelo River as Environmental Flow Reserves for ecological preservation purposes.

== Usage conflicts ==
The Futaleufú area of Palena District Chile, is rich in natural resources of timber, water, precious metal, and natural scenery that attract competing interests concerning utilization. This predominantly rural region relies on small-scale agriculture and fisheries as its principal industries, and currently ranks among Chile's lowest in economic performance. Adventure travel and ecotourism have been steadily contributing to growth in recent years, as Chilean and international visitors are attracted to the area's rugged mountains and whitewater rivers. X Region is, in fact, visited by international tourists more than any other rural region of Chile. These same mountains and rivers, however, are prime targets for resource development by mining and hydropower companies.

Hydropower development promises affordable electricity and creation of new jobs in the region, and mining industry would likely follow with more jobs. However, such activities would exclude much traditional economy and tourism around the Futaleufú, possibly displacing more jobs than they create for local residents. Reservoirs, new roads, land degradation, and mining sites are largely incompatible with previous land uses in areas where this new infrastructure would be established. If completed, dams and their accompanying infrastructure would open previously remote areas to mining activities—for which some companies already have listed claims. This raises issues of environmental justice, as many local people, including some of indigenous heritage, would be disenfranchised by changing land use and economic structure. Some energy from hydropower companies would be used locally by residents, mining operations, and other industry, but Endesa's previous plans suggest that most electricity would be transmitted northward to Chile's metropolitan areas, which commonly experience power shortages.

Many residents and community organizers believe that tourism may be the key to a more sustainable path toward development in Palena and be better for its communities in the long run. In the absence of hydropower and extractive development, tourist visitation is expected to continue increasing in coming years, drawn by the Futaleufú's pristine whitewater and unspoiled natural scenery. Ecotourism is already bringing an influx of money to the region and can multiply benefits in the future. However, the industry must be managed carefully to minimize environmental impact and empower local communities. High traffic during the tourism season can cause degradation from transportation demands, energy use, and waste. Additionally, if tourist attractions and infrastructure are not owned and operated locally, revenue may escape the region rather than capturing benefits for the people who live there.

== Nonprofit organizations and activists that advocate for the Futaleufú ==
When Endesa retracted its plans for building three large hydroelectric dams, the company acknowledged widespread international opposition as a major reason for the decision. This is a major victory for activists, but no one denies that the watershed is still threatened. Endesa could reopen plans or sell its development rights to another company at any time.

Futaleufú Riverkeeper, Ecosistemas, and International Rivers are notable NGOs that currently advocate for the Futaleufú. Futaleufú Riverkeeper--based in New York City, USA, and Futaleufú Chile--has been outspoken on the front line of much debate surrounding the river. It is the only keeper organization dedicated to the Futaleufú. Executive Director Rocio Gonzalez is a Chilean native and lives in Futaleufú with her family. Patrick J. Lynch, the organization's International Director, is a public interest lawyer licensed in New York. Another U.S. attorney involved with the Futaleufú is Robert F. Kennedy, Jr., well-known luminary of environmental law and president of Waterkeeper Alliance.

Chilean attorney Juan Pablo Orrego is president of the Chilean NGO Ecosistemas and board member of International Rivers, a US-based NGO involved with rivers worldwide. International Rivers and the broader coalition Patagonia Defense Council (CDP) popularized the Patagonia Sin Represas (Patagonia without dams) campaign. This internationally supported movement was influential in opposition to the proposed HidroAysén hydropower project, which was disapproved by Chile's Committee of Ministers in June 2014.

Fighting for the Futaleufú, a documentary film by Stephanie Haig, was released in 2013 and has toured international film festivals. The film highlights the effects that hydroelectric dams would have on the watershed and the people living there.
