= Yelcho River =

Coordinates: 42.9561°S 72.7508°W

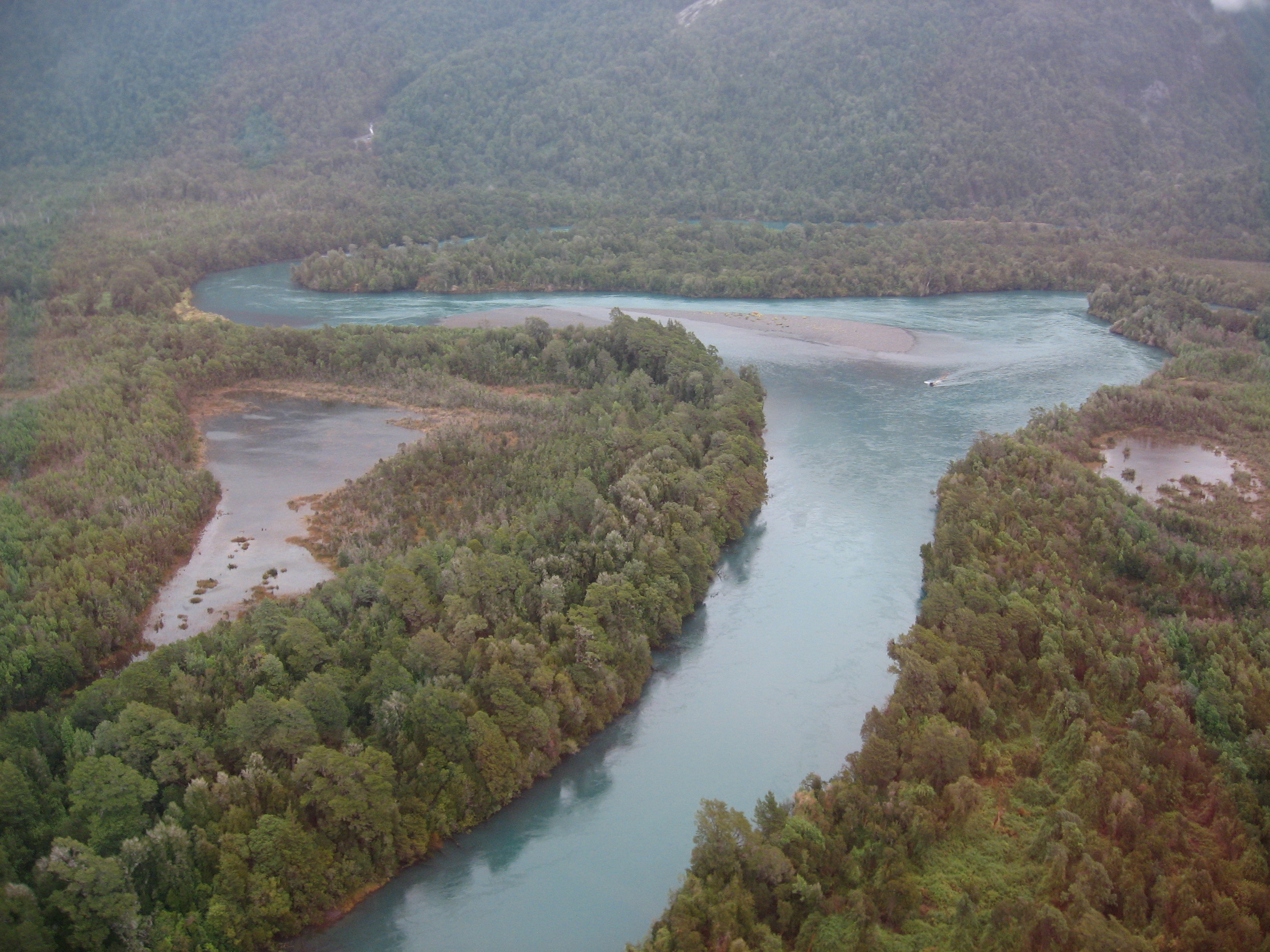

Location
- Country: Chile

Physical characteristics
- Source
  - location: Yelcho lake
- Mouth
  - location: Gulf of Corcovado
  - elevation: 0 m (0 ft)
- Basin size: 11,515 km^{2} (4,446 sq mi)
- Discharge
  - average: 360 m^{3}/s (13,000 cu ft/s)

The Yelcho River is a river in the Los Lagos Region of southern Chile.

== See also ==
- List of rivers of Chile
