= Yelcho Lake =

Lake in Chile

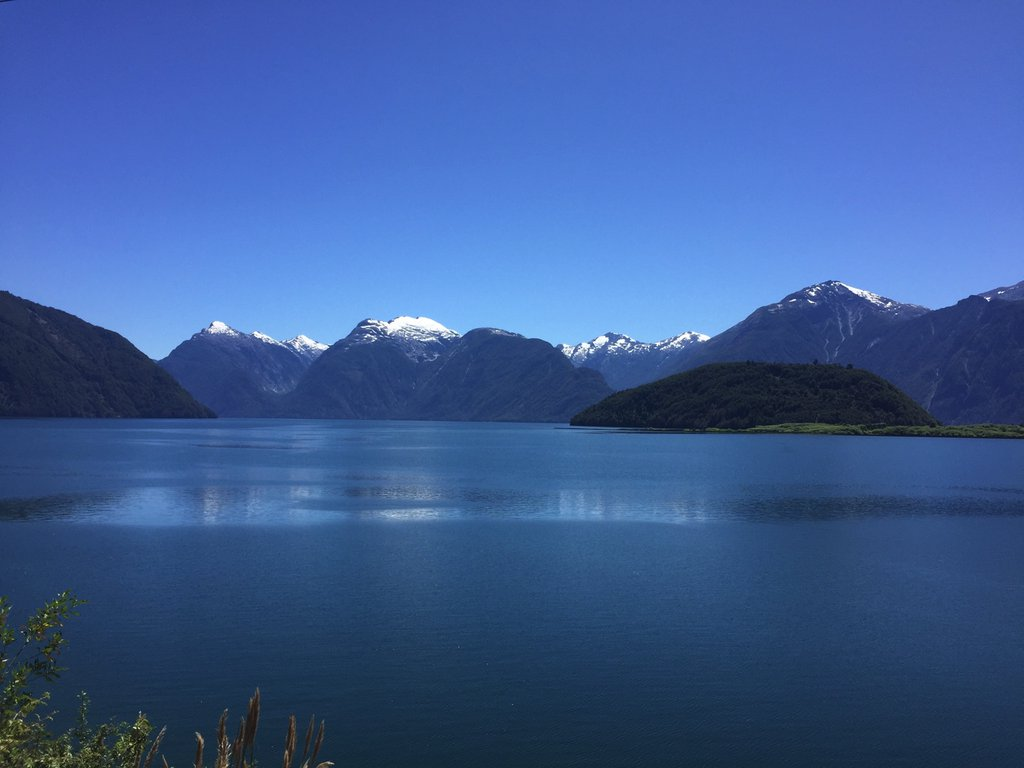
- Yelcho Lake as seen from the southern tip, near Puerto Ramirez

- Location within Chile
- Location: Palena Province
- Coordinates: 43°18′S 72°18′W
- Type: fjord lake
- Primary inflows: Futaleufú River
- Primary outflows: Yelcho River
- Catchment area: 11,158 km^{2} (4,308 sq mi)
- Basin countries: Argentina, Chile
- Max. length: 29 km (18 mi)
- Max. width: 6 km (3.7 mi)
- Surface area: 116 km^{2} (45 sq mi)
- Average depth: 135 m (443 ft)
- Max. depth: 238 m (781 ft)
- Water volume: 15.66 km^{3} (3.76 cu mi)
- Surface elevation: 60 m (200 ft)
- Settlements: Puerto Cárdenas

Yelcho Lake is a large fjord-shaped lake located in Chilean Patagonia, in southern Palena province of Los Lagos Region, Chile. The lake receives the waters of the Futaleufu River at its southern tip, near the tiny settlement of Puerto Ramirez. The river then flows northward through mountainous and glaciated terrain, until it outflows via the Yelcho River north-west and empties into Gulf of Corcovado, near Chaitén. The lake is a popular destination for fly fishing, and several lodges and hotels operate on its shores. Yelcho Lake is most frequently accessed via the town of Chaitén to the north. Two small commercial airlines operate daily flights from Puerto Montt. Another option is ferry service direct from Puerto Montt, the bimodal ferry service from the town of Hornopiren, or direct from the port of Quellón on the island of Chiloe on the other side of the Gulf of Corcovado. Traffic on the Carretera Austral along the western shore of Yelcho Lake was interrupted in December 2017 due to a mudslide in the settlement of Villa Santa Lucía, which killed 21 people and keeps missing one. The road reopened in February 2018.
