= Paso Dos Lagunas =

Coordinates: 48°57′36″S 72°48′57″W

Dos Lagunas Pass (also known as Portezuelo de la Divisoria Pass or O'Higgins Pass) is a border crossing between the Republic of Argentina and the Republic of Chile. It connects the commune of O'Higgins in the Aysén Region of Chile with the Lago Argentino Department in the Santa Cruz Province of Argentina.

At the pass, there is the border marker IV-0-B, and it serves as a key point on the tourist route between Villa O'Higgins and El Chaltén.

Access from the Chilean side is via Route X-915, located near the Laguna Redonda Airport, and approximately 16 kilometers from the Chilean settlement of Candelario Mancilla. On the Argentine side, the path is unpaved and becomes a hiking trail.

It is one of the entry points to the Lago del Desierto Provincial Reserve in Argentina.

== History ==
The Laguna del Desierto dispute was solved in 1994 by an international award, ratified in 1995. After this, the border crossing was opened. In 1991 Argentina built the road from the south to the then disputed body of water, but left the northern part without one.

== See also ==
- Marconi Pass
- Paso del Viento
- Huemul Pass
- Laguna del Desierto incident
