= Chile Route X-915 =

Road in the Aysén Region, southern Chile

Route X-915
- Gravel mountain road
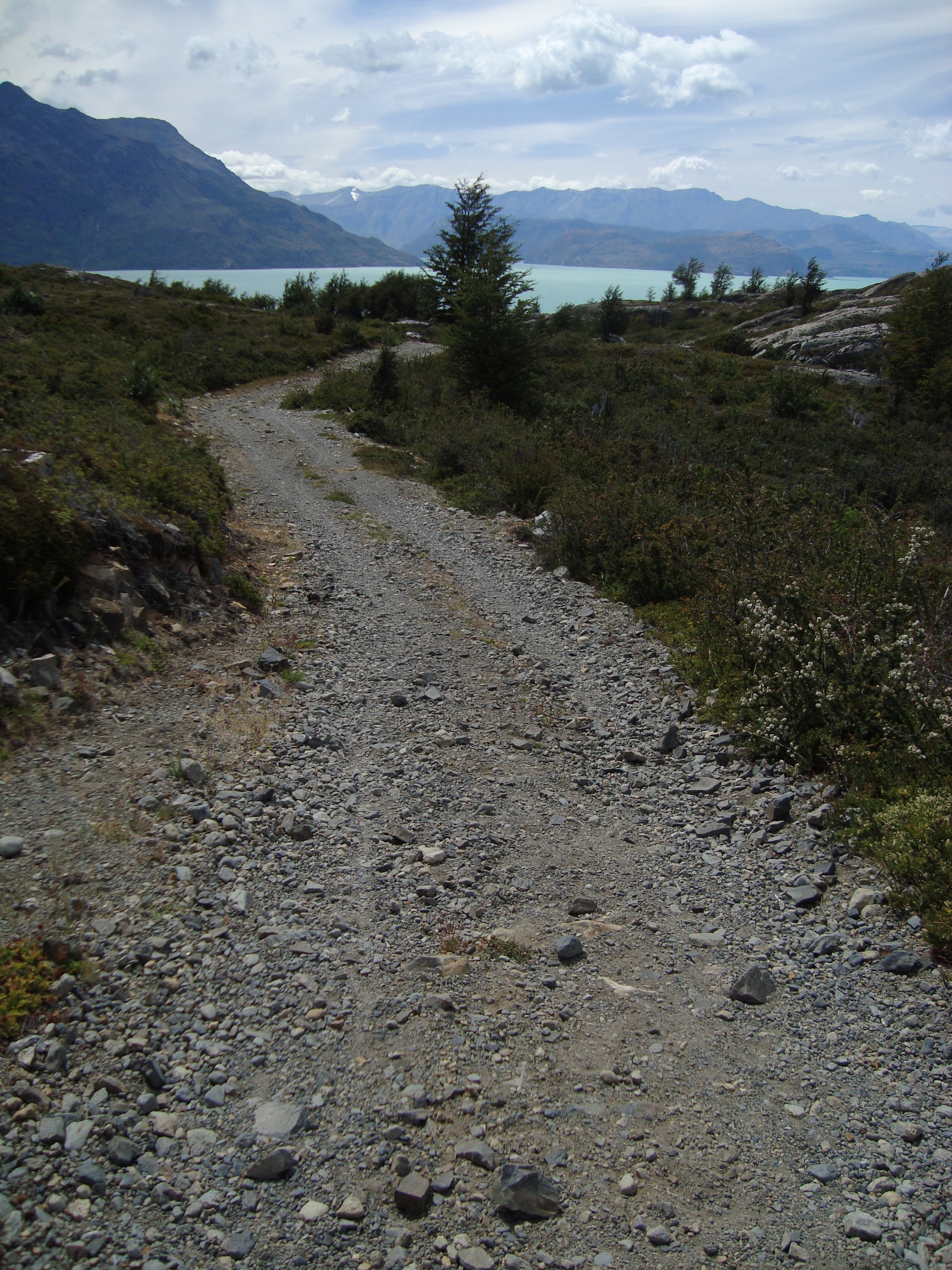

Major junctions
- From: Candelario Mancilla (commune of O'Higgins, in the Capitán Prat Province)
- Laguna Redonda Airport, Retén de Carabineros Laguna Redonda (abandoned)
- To: Paso Dos Lagunas (Argentina–Chile border)

Location
- Country: Chile

Highway system
- Highways in Chile

The Chile Route X-915, is a gravel road located in the Aysén Region of southern Chile, connecting the locality of Candelario Mancilla with the Paso Dos Lagunas near the Laguna del Desierto. It traverses a valley containing a Magellanic forest and connects with the Laguna Redonda Airport; the road ends abruptly upon reaching the border marker IV-0-B.

Chile has requested Argentina to construct a 5 km road in the "North Shore Section of Lago del Desierto" to connect with Route X-915 due to the significant flow of tourists who travel on foot or by bicycle from O'Higgins Lake to Laguna del Desierto.

== History ==
The Laguna del Desierto dispute was solved in 1994 by an international award, ratified in 1995. After this, the border crossing was opened. In 1991 Argentina built the road from the south to the then disputed body of water, but left the northern part without one.

== See also ==
- Laguna del Desierto incident
