= Cerro Gorra Blanca =

Mountain in Chile and Argentina

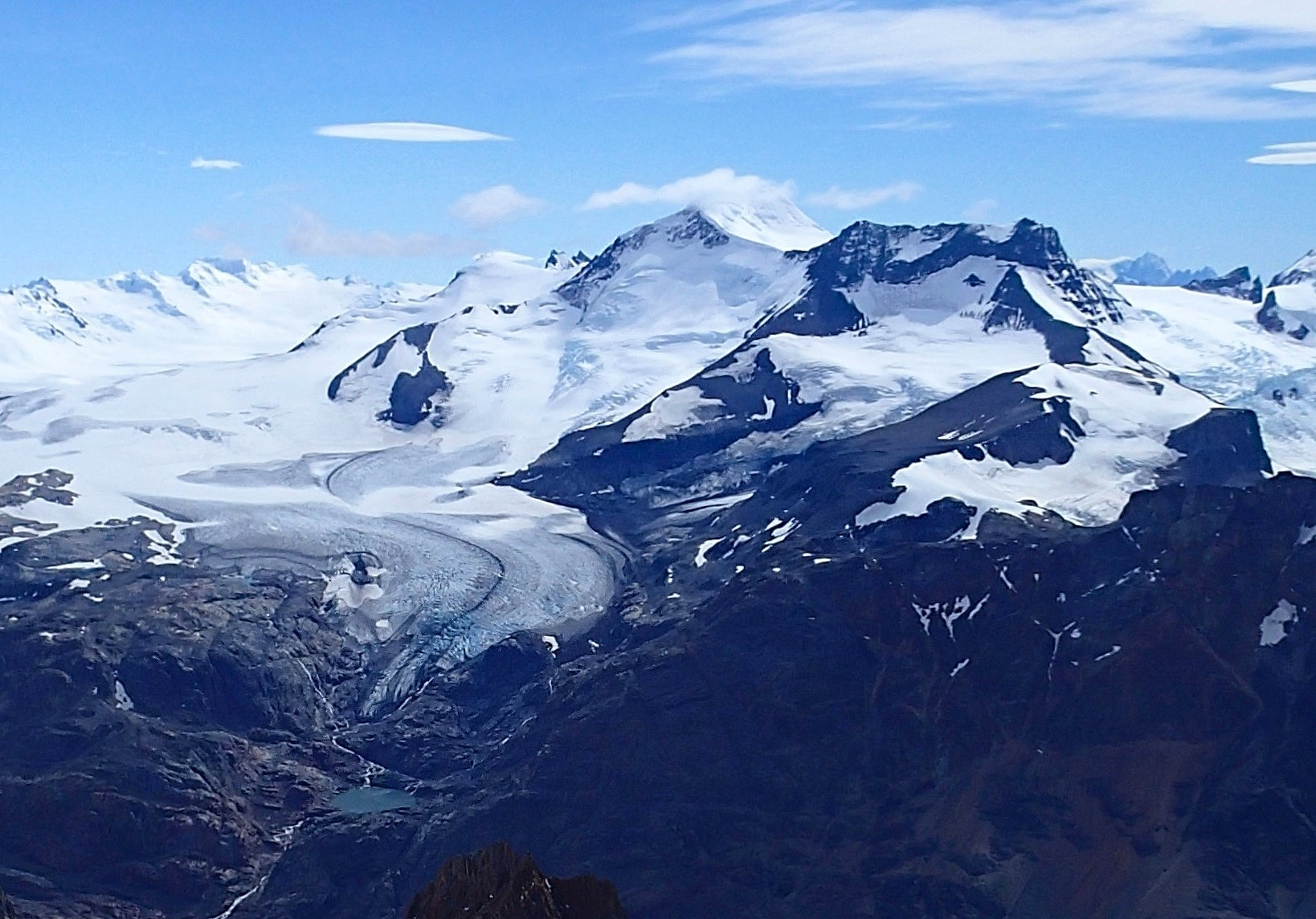
- South side of Gorra Blanca centered on skyline

Highest point
- Elevation: 2,920 m (9,580 ft)
- Coordinates: 49°08′02″S 73°04′59″W

Geography
- Location within Southern Patagonia
- Location: Southern Patagonia
- Parent range: Andes

Climbing
- First ascent: In 1984 by Italians Gino Buscaini and Silvia Metzeltin.

The Cerro Gorra Blanca is a glaciated mountain in the Andes of Patagonia, located southwest of Laguna del Desierto on the eastern edge of the Southern Patagonian Ice Field, on the border between Chile and Argentina. On the Chilean side, it is part of the O'Higgins commune in the Capitán Prat Province, Aysén Region, while on the Argentine side, it belongs to the Lago Argentino Department in the Province of Santa Cruz. It stands at an altitude of 2,920 m (9,580 ft).

South of the mountain, a nunatak houses the Eduardo García Soto Chilean shelter, installed in 2004 near the Marconi Pass by the Chilean Institute of Ice Fields.

On the Chilean side, it is located within the Bernardo O'Higgins National Park, while on the Argentine side, it is part of the Lago del Desierto Provincial Reserve.

== History and Etymology ==
=== Etymology ===
The mountain's name derives from the snow and ice formations at its summit, which resemble a white cap.

=== Territorial Dispute ===
The area was part of the Laguna del Desierto dispute, with no consensus on the border until 1994, when an arbitral tribunal ruled in favor of Argentina, granting it partial sovereignty over the mountain.
