= Mayer River =

River in Argentina and Chile

Coordinates: 48.355336°S 72.432861°W

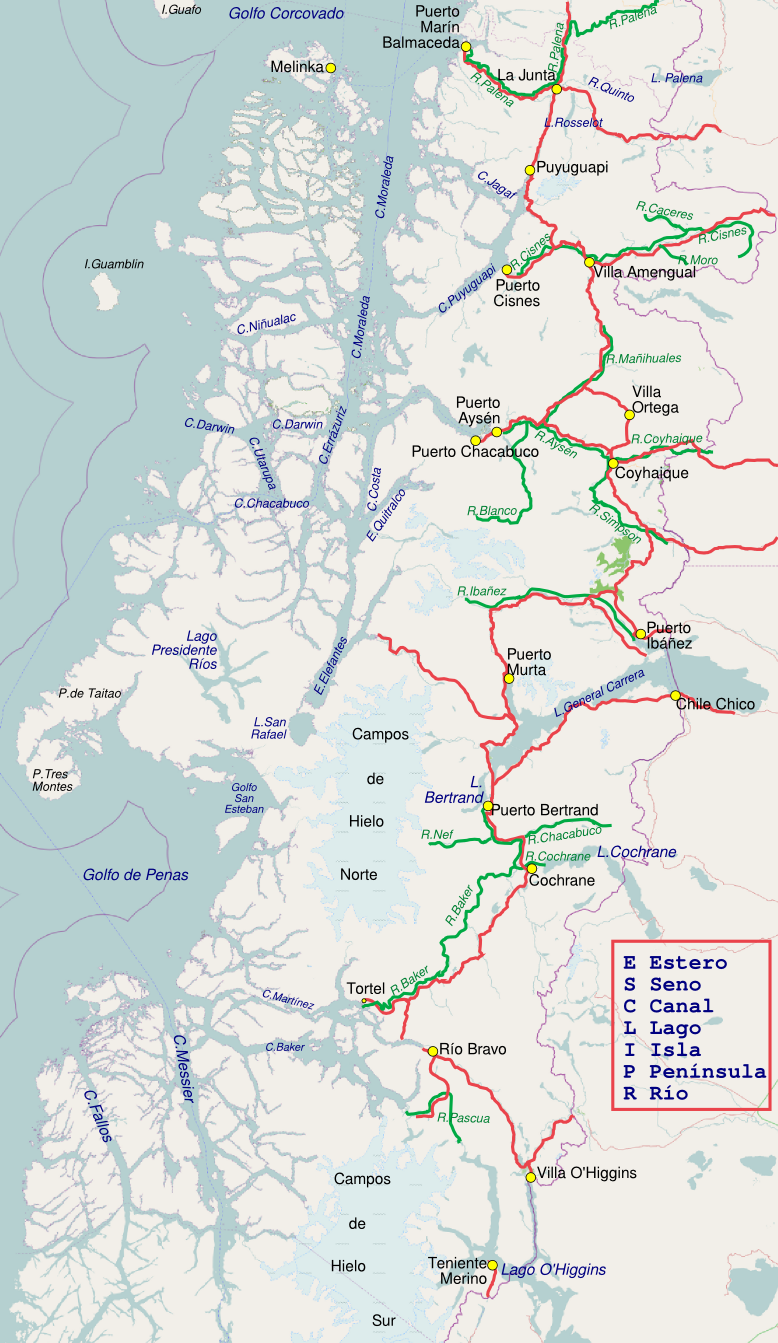
- Mayer River flows north of Villa O'Higgins

Location
- Countries: Chile and Argentina

Physical characteristics
- Source
  - location: Andes Cordillera

The Mayer River is a river of Argentina, where it originates, and Chile. It flows into the O'Higgins/San Martin Lake, the deepest lake in the Americas.

== Etymology ==
The name of the river is a homage to the Argentine soldier, writer and statesman Edelmiro Mayer.

== See also ==
- List of rivers of Argentina
- List of rivers of Chile
- Villa O'Higgins
- Carretera Austral
