= Candelario Mancilla =

- Settlement
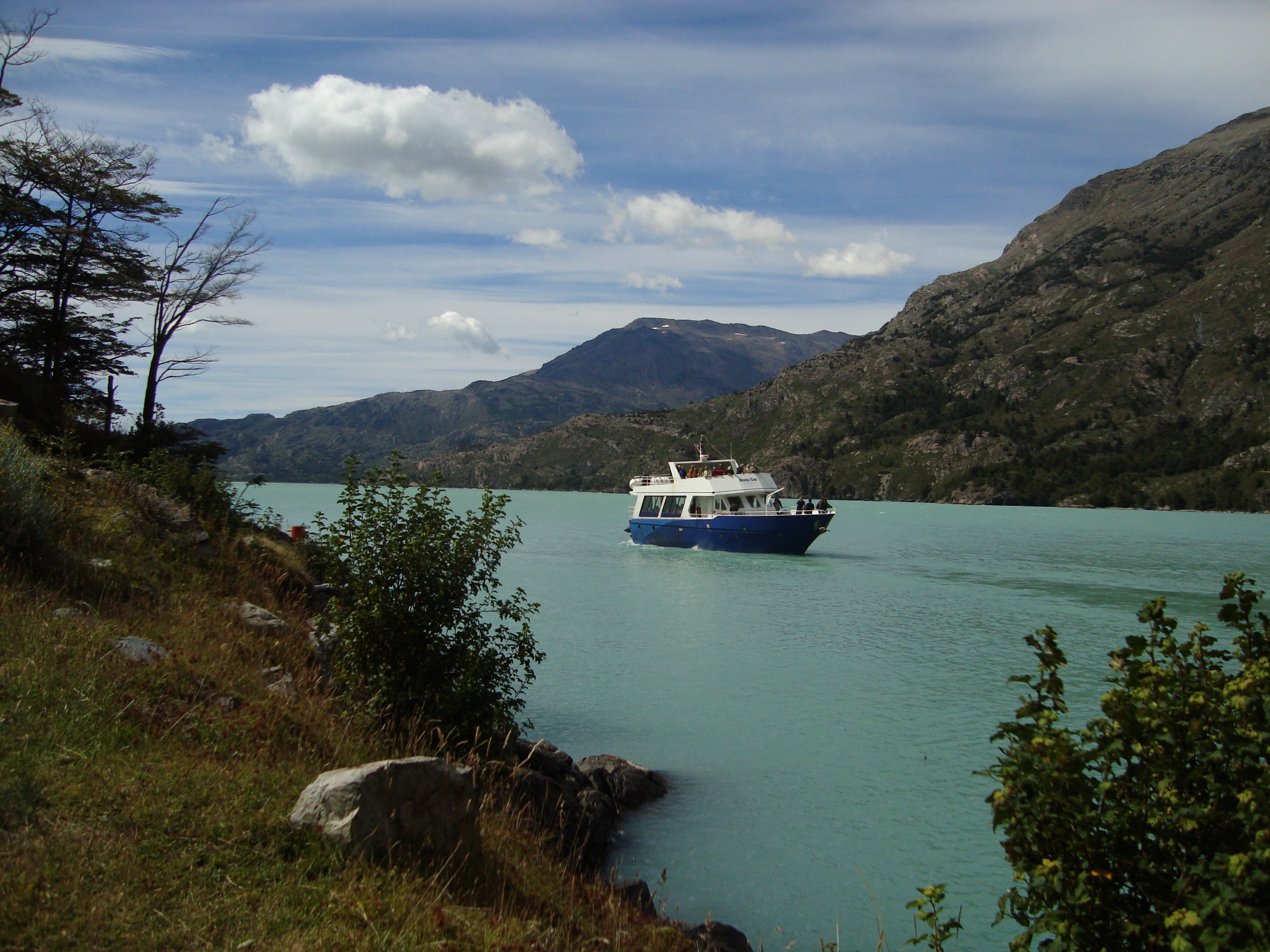
- Ferry at Candelario Mancilla

- Location within Aysén
- Coordinates: 48°52.31076′S 72°44.18391′W
- Country: Chile
- Region: Aysen
- Province: Capitán Prat
- Commune: O'Higgins

Population
  - Total: 2
- Climate: Cfb

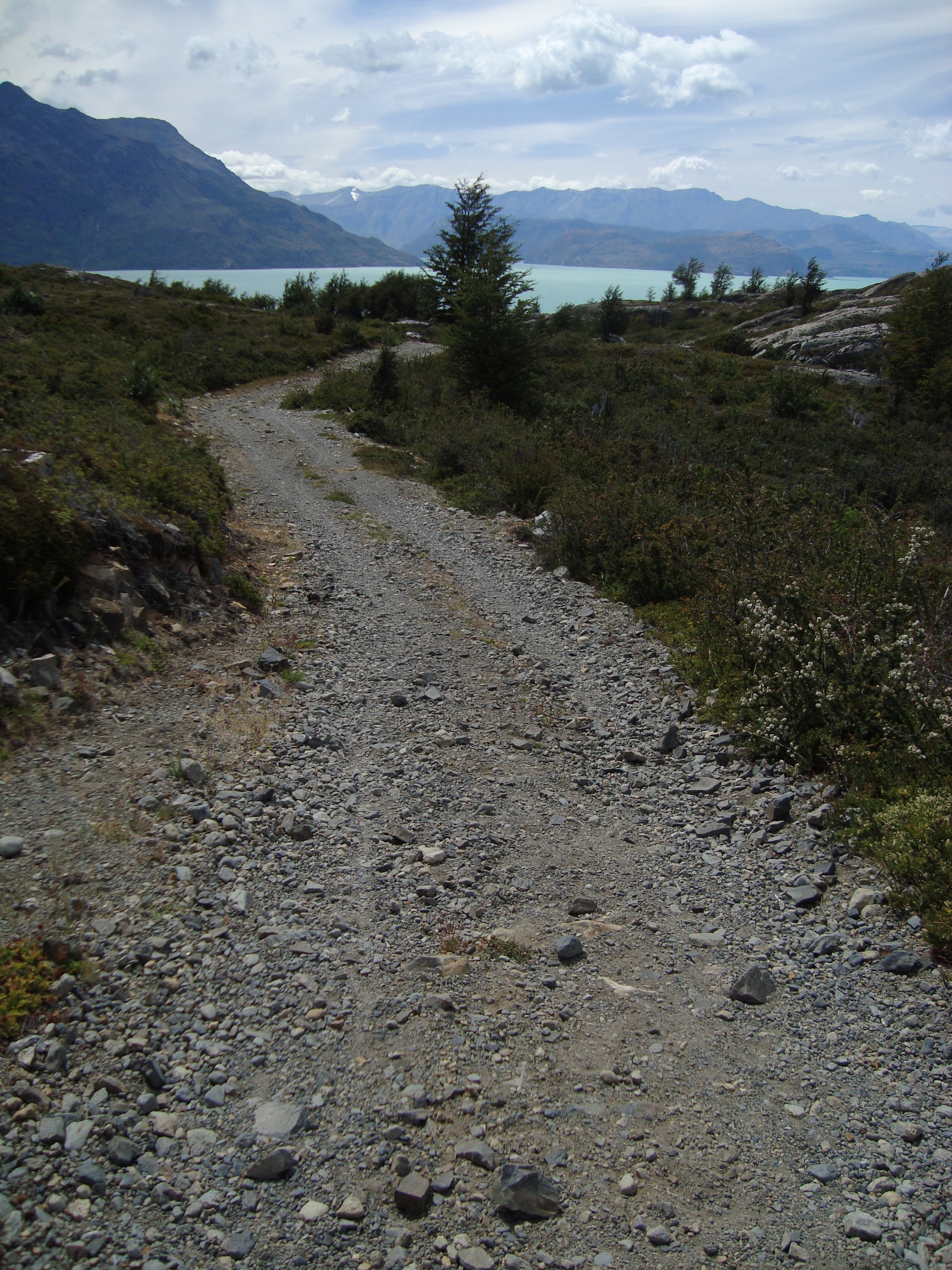
Rocky Road from the border to Candelario Mancilla

Candelario Mancilla is a small settlement in the Aysén Region of southern Chile, located at the shores of the lake O'Higgins/San Martín. It is 16 kilometers to the north from the border with Argentina (Landmark IV-0-B), and is a key point on the tourist route Villa O'Higgins – El Chaltén. The settlement is connected to the rest of Chile via ferry to Villa O'Higgins where Carretera Austral (Southern Highway) ends.

In the place lives only a family of Chilean settlers and some Carabineros that are border guards. The town receives its name from the pioneer José Candelario Mancilla Uribe, who came to settle the lake O'Higgins in 1927.

Formerly, this settlement received several expeditions of climbers and scientists who roamed the area or moved towards the great glaciers of the lake. In November 2001, the border crossing "Dos Lagunas" was opened between Chile and Argentina, which has increased tourism progressively in the area. Currently, around 2,000 tourists pass through the settlement each year.

The place is near the Del Desierto Lake, a place where Chile & Argentina had a border dispute until 1994. In 1965 an incident occurred where the Chilean Carabinero, Hernán Merino Correa, died after a battle with the Argentine Gendarmerie.

Near the border is the Laguna Redonda Airport accessible from Route X-915 and Cerro Tobi can be seen from the town. The pier of the place is called "Sofanor Mancilla".

== History ==
=== 1900–1949 ===
José Candelario Mancilla Uribe (1900–1967) was a Chilean inhabitant of Lake O'Higgins who arrived in the area in 1927 together with his wife, Teresa Mancilla Oyarzún (1906–1992). Both had emigrated from the city of Puerto Montt to Punta Arenas. After their marriage in 1921, they worked in estancias of the Argentine province of Santa Cruz, until finally arriving at Lake O'Higgins/San Martín in 1927. The couple had six children, all born in Lake O'Higgins and one in Comandante Luis Piedrabuena, Argentina.

The place where Candelario Mancilla is located was first populated by British immigrants, and since 1933 by the family of Mancilla, who carried out a hard work of colonization, along with dozens of families scattered by other sectors of Lake O'Higgins.

José Candelario Mancilla, like the inhabitants of the lake, demanded from the first years of the settlement state support for their families, however this was always null, having to get ahead with their own effort.

=== 1950–1999 ===
One action that has received national recognition was the construction of the landing track in the sector of Ventisquero Chico, in 1956, which allowed the arrival of flights of sovereignty of the Chilean Air Force, the first support from the state to the pioneer settlement of the lake.

In 1961, a detachment of Carabineros de Chile was installed on lands ceded by Mancilla, and years later serious border incidents took place between the Chilean and Argentine police forces due to the sovereignty of the area of Laguna del Desierto, where Mancilla makes an active support to the Chilean units that are worth the recognition of the presidential authority of the time.

It was Candelario Mancilla's own family who gave the name to the place, which is recognized for the first time with the construction of the wharf in 1992. Subsequently, travel guides and tourism have given it recognition, as a must for travelers and adventurers from all over the world.

=== 2000–2049 ===
Recently, the only settlers in the place are the descendants of Candelario Mancilla who reside in the cattle ranch and tourist "Santa Teresita", and the police endowment of the Carabineros de Chile settlement called "Hernán Merino Correa".

The Regional Government of Aysén preliminarily projected the year 2012 the idea of expanding the settlement of Candelario Mancilla by including it in the Regional Policy of Isolated Areas.

== See also ==
- Laguna del Desierto incident
