= Marconi Pass =

Coordinates: 49.1858°S 73.1441°W

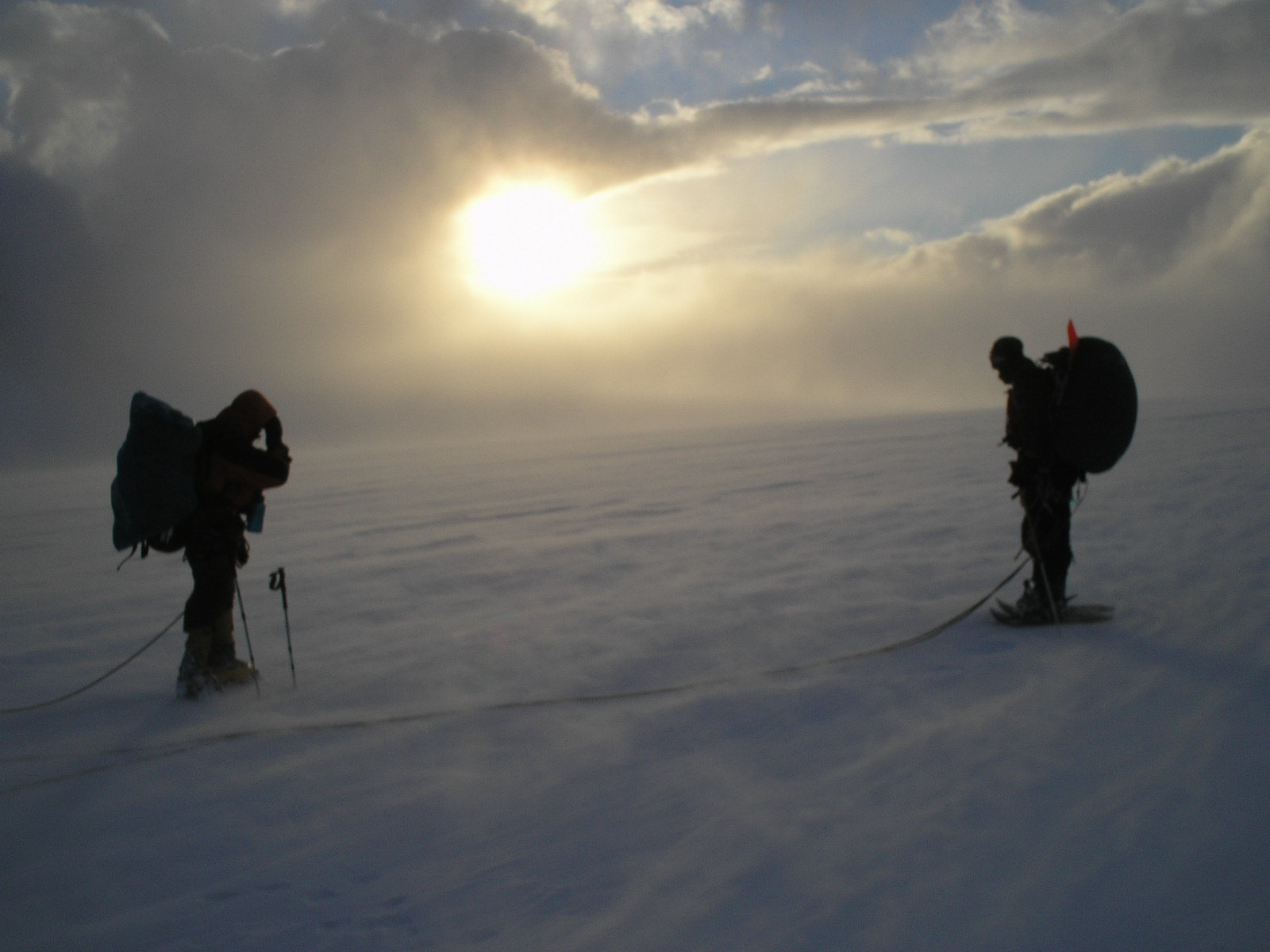

Geography
- Location within Southern Patagonia
- Country: Chile / Argentina

The Marconi Pass is a mountain pass and a border crossing between the Republic of Argentina and the Republic of Chile. It is located in the northeast of the Southern Patagonian Ice Field. The pass connects the commune of O'Higgins in the Aysén Region with the Lago Argentino Department in the Province of Santa Cruz.

It serves as one of the entry points to the Bernardo O'Higgins National Park, monitored by CONAF.

The pass lies near Cerro Gorra Blanca and the Eduardo García Soto Chilean shelter, established in 2004 by the Chilean Institute of Ice Fields.

The nearest settlements are El Chaltén in Argentina and Candelario Mancilla in Chile.

== See also ==
- Del Viento Pass
- Huemul Pass
- Southern Patagonian Ice Field dispute
