= Baker Channel =

Coordinates: 47°48′50″S 74°30′30″W

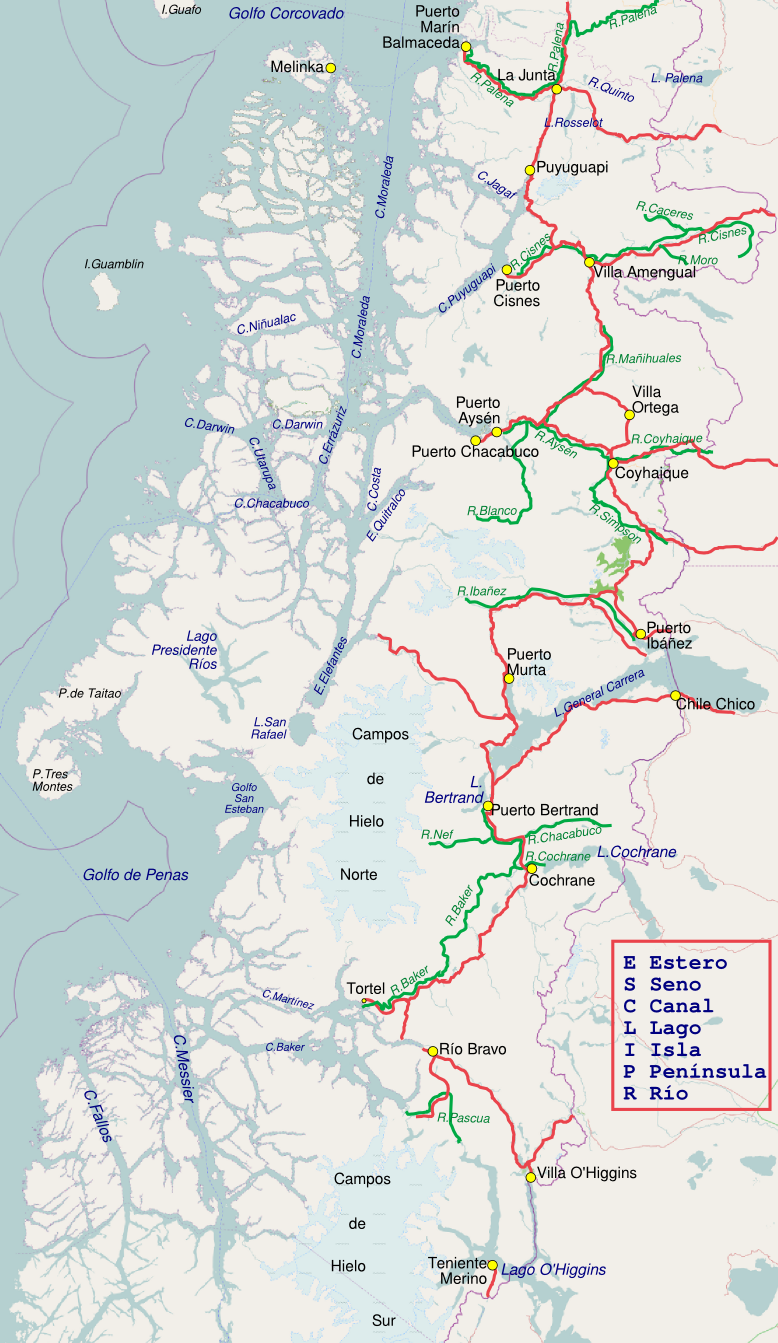
Baker Channel in the Aysén Region

Baker Channel, also known as Calen Inlet, is a channel of Chile located in the Tortel, Aysén del General Carlos Ibáñez del Campo Region. The Baker River discharges into Martinez Inlet, the northern part of this large estuary. It penetrates the mainland about 75 miles (121 km) and opens into Tarn Bay at the south-east corner of the Gulf of Penas. Merino Jarpa Island lies wholly within this great estuary, while at its mouth lies a group of smaller islands, called Baker Islands, which separate it from Messier Channel. Baker Channel also receives the waters of the O'Higgins/San Martín Lake through the Pascua River. The lake's far-reaching fjord-like arms extend approximately from lat. 49° 11' to 48° 22' S. Its north-west arm is that which drains into the mentioned river.

The calving front of Jorge Montt Glacier, which is the northern glacier of the Southern Patagonian Ice Field, reaches the Baker Channel. A number of icebergs can be seen in this area.

The channel marks the northern border of the Bernardo O'Higgins National Park, and is home to the Katalalixar National Reserve on Merino Jarpa Island.

The shores of the channel contain forests of Nothofagus nitida and Pilgerodendron uviferum. These forests are rich in lichens endemic to Chile and nearby areas of Argentina.

== See also ==
- Caleta Tortel
- Tortel Fjord
- Guayaneco Archipelago
- Northern Patagonian Ice Field
