= Chilean Institute of Ice Fields =

- Instituto Chileno de Campos de Hielo
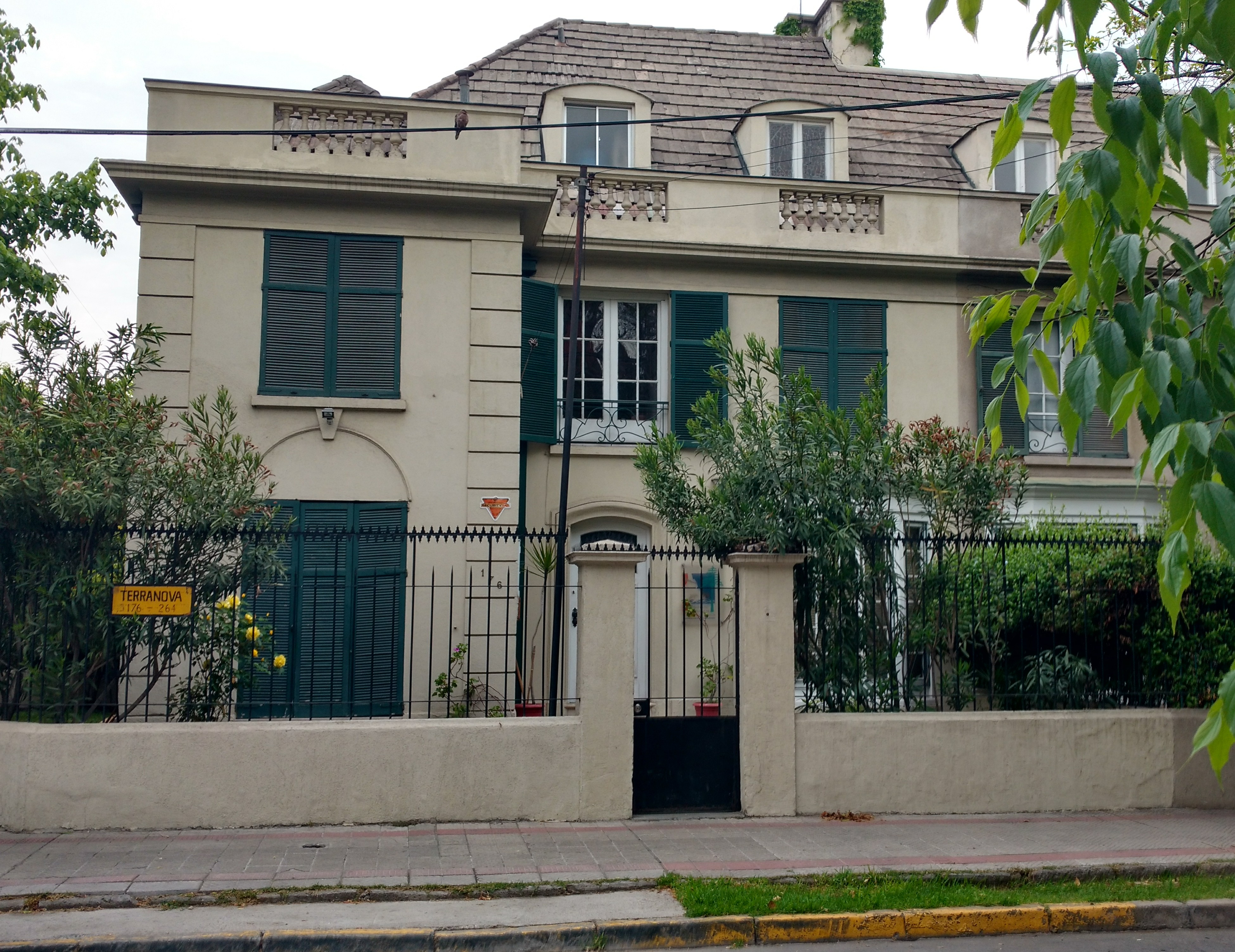
- ICIF headquarters in Providencia.

Non-profit private corporation overview
- Formed: April 30, 1998
- Jurisdiction: Chile
- Headquarters: Terranova 176, Providencia, Santiago, Chile; 33.4418°S 70.6498°W
- Non-profit private corporation executive: Enrique Zamora Mondaca, Executive Director
- Website: Official website of the Chilean Institute of Ice Fields

The Chilean Institute of Ice Fields (ICIF) is a Chilean non-profit private corporation that conducts and disseminates scientific research, exploration, special interest tourism, mountain sports, and the construction of enabling infrastructure to promote the extensive region of the Southern Patagonian Ice Field in its Chilean section, located in the Aysén Region and Magallanes and Chilean Antarctic Region in Patagonia.

For its activities, the institute has an ongoing framework agreement with CONAF, the administrator of the National Parks system. The institute also supports the training of professionals in various disciplines related to earth sciences, biological sciences, and tourism, maintaining agreements with several national universities.

== History ==
The ICIF was created by Supreme Decree N° 431 of the Ministry of Justice on April 30, 1998.

== Shelters ==
=== Built Shelters ===
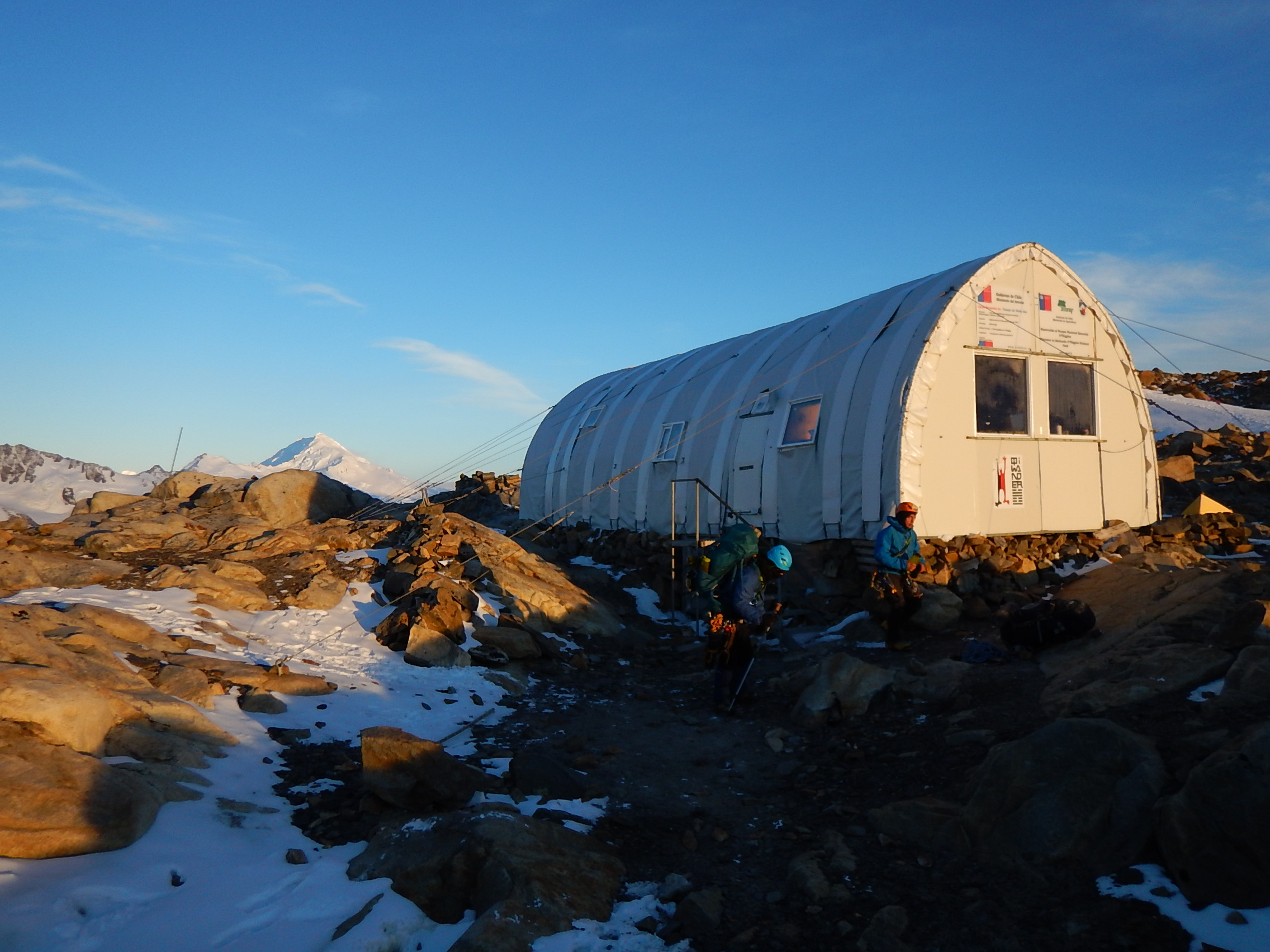
Eduardo García Soto Shelter in the Southern Patagonian Ice Field.

- Eduardo García Soto: Installed in 2004, it is located on the east face of Mount Fitz Roy on the southern nunatak of Cerro Gorra Blanca, near Marconi Pass.

=== Planned Shelters ===
- Exmauth: Planned for construction on the Comandante Plateau, Trinidad Glacier, accessible from Exmouth Fjord near Puerto Edén.
- Montt Glacier: Planned for construction near Jorge Montt Glacier.

== Program ==
Southern Cone Core Program: Carried out in the northern third of the Southern Patagonian Ice Field, it involves the creation of a series of institutional headquarters, forward camps, and ice shelters in the designated area, facilitating access to this region.

As part of the program, three institutional headquarters have been built in Caleta Tortel, two forward camps near Jorge Montt Glacier, and one shelter near Cerro Gorra Blanca.
