= Caleta La Arena =

Town in Los Lagos Region, Chile

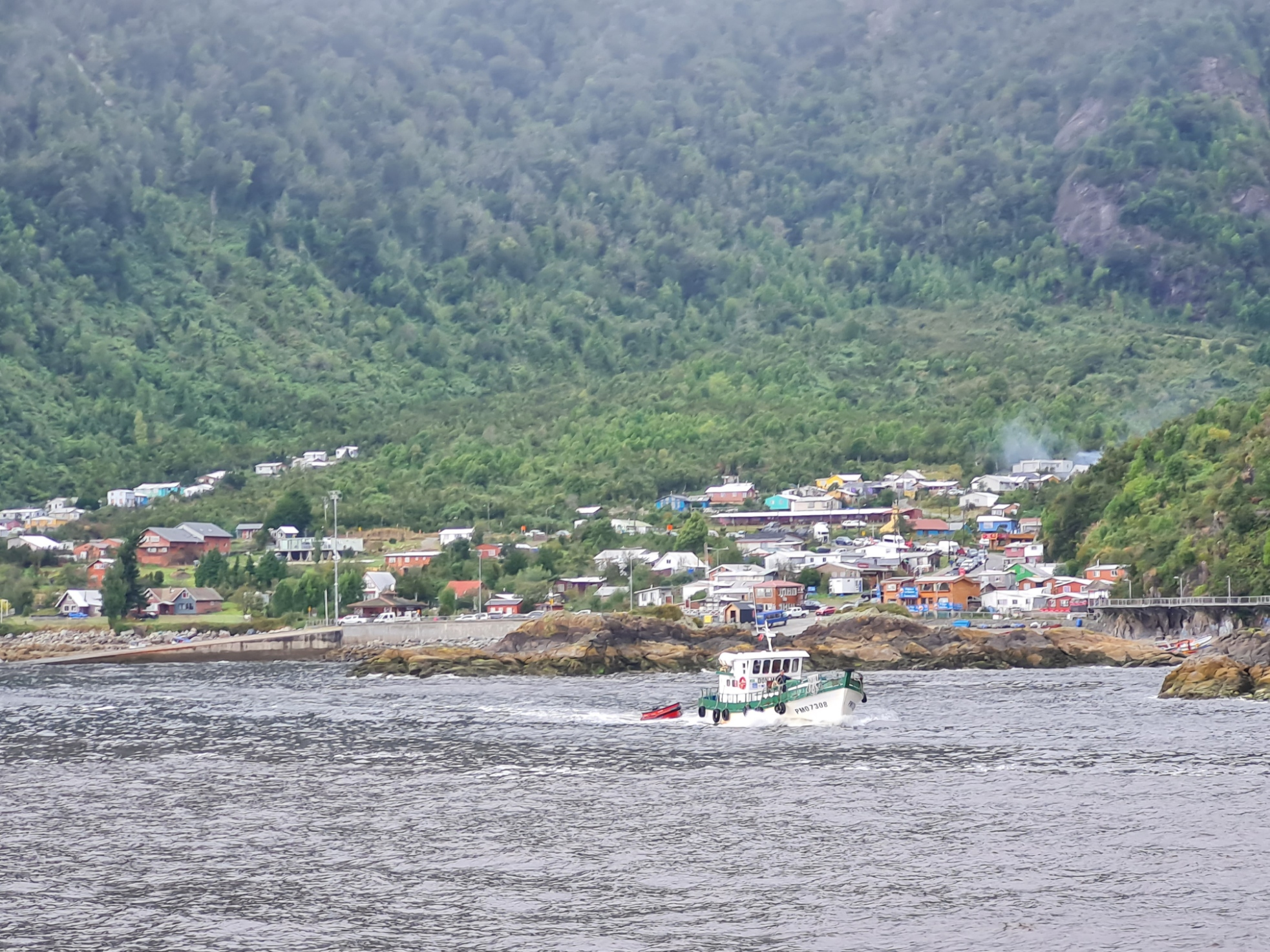

- Coat of arms
- Interactive map of Caleta La Arena
- Coordinates: 41°41′S 72°38′W
- Country: Chile
- Region: Los Lagos
- Province: Llanquihue
  - Summer (DST): UTC−3 (CLST)

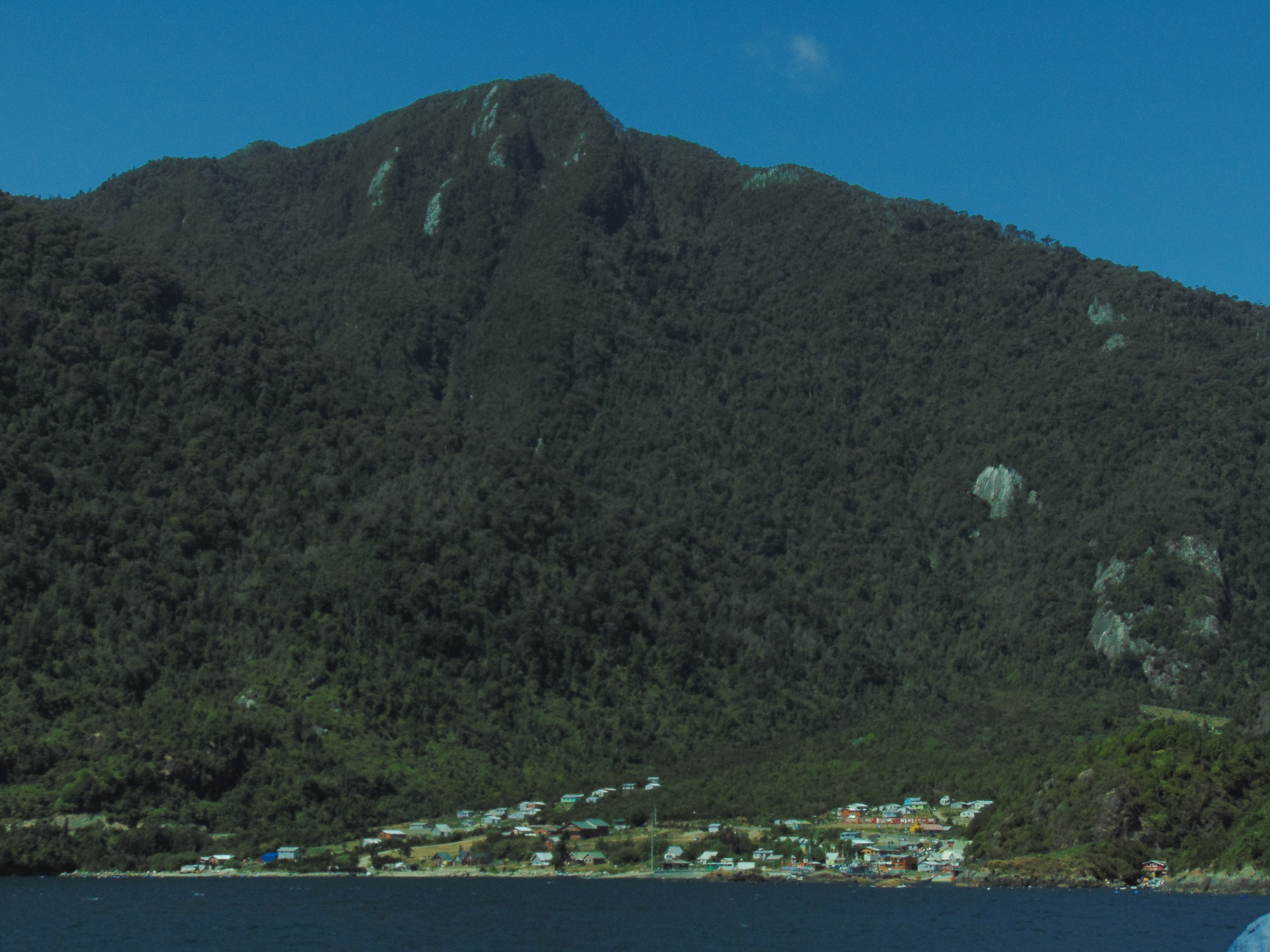
La Arena Cove from Ferry "Don Juan"

Caleta La Arena is a small town on the northern edge of Reloncaví Estuary, in the commune of Puerto Montt, Los Lagos Region, Chile.

Caleta La Arena is located near route CH-7, also known as Carretera Austral, that starts in the city of Puerto Montt, 45 km (28 miles) away.

This location is 13 kilometers (8 miles) south of Lenca and 36 kilometers (22 miles) from the town of Chamiza.

Caleta La Arena is located in the northern edge of Reloncaví Estuary. Here exists a ramp for ferry service and from this point it operates as far as Caleta Puelche which takes 45 minutes of journey and where you can continue by land to south by Carretera Austral or access to the range until Puelo Bajo and Cochamó in the commune of Hualaihué.

The main news event was in 2014, when a submarine sunk in front of the cove.

== Access ==
La Arena Cove is located at km 45 of the Carretera Austral, which begins in the city of Puerto Montt. It was enabled in 1982; Until then, the only possible connection with the rest of the Chilean territory from here was by sea. This town is located 13 kilometers south of the town of Lenca and 36 kilometers from Chamiza.

There is also a subsidized boat in Caleta La Arena that connects with sectors of the Reloncaví estuary. It has a frequency of two monthly trips to transport passengers in general, and it reaches the towns of Barquitas, Cajón, Sotomó Bajo, Isla Marimeli, Sotomó Alto and San Luis
