= Cochrane, Chile =

Cochrane
- Town and Commune
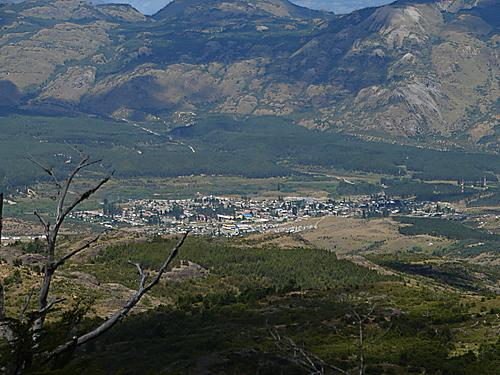
- The town of Cochrane

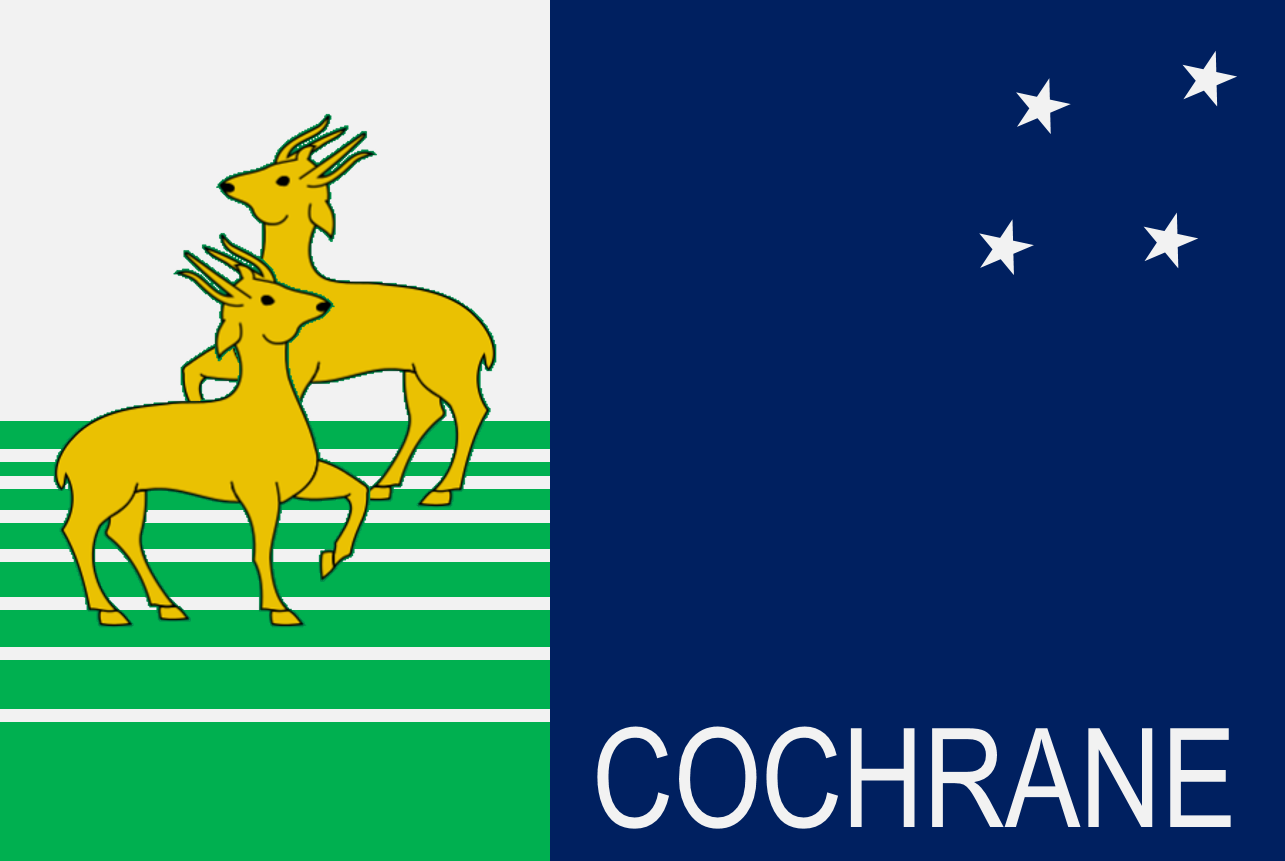
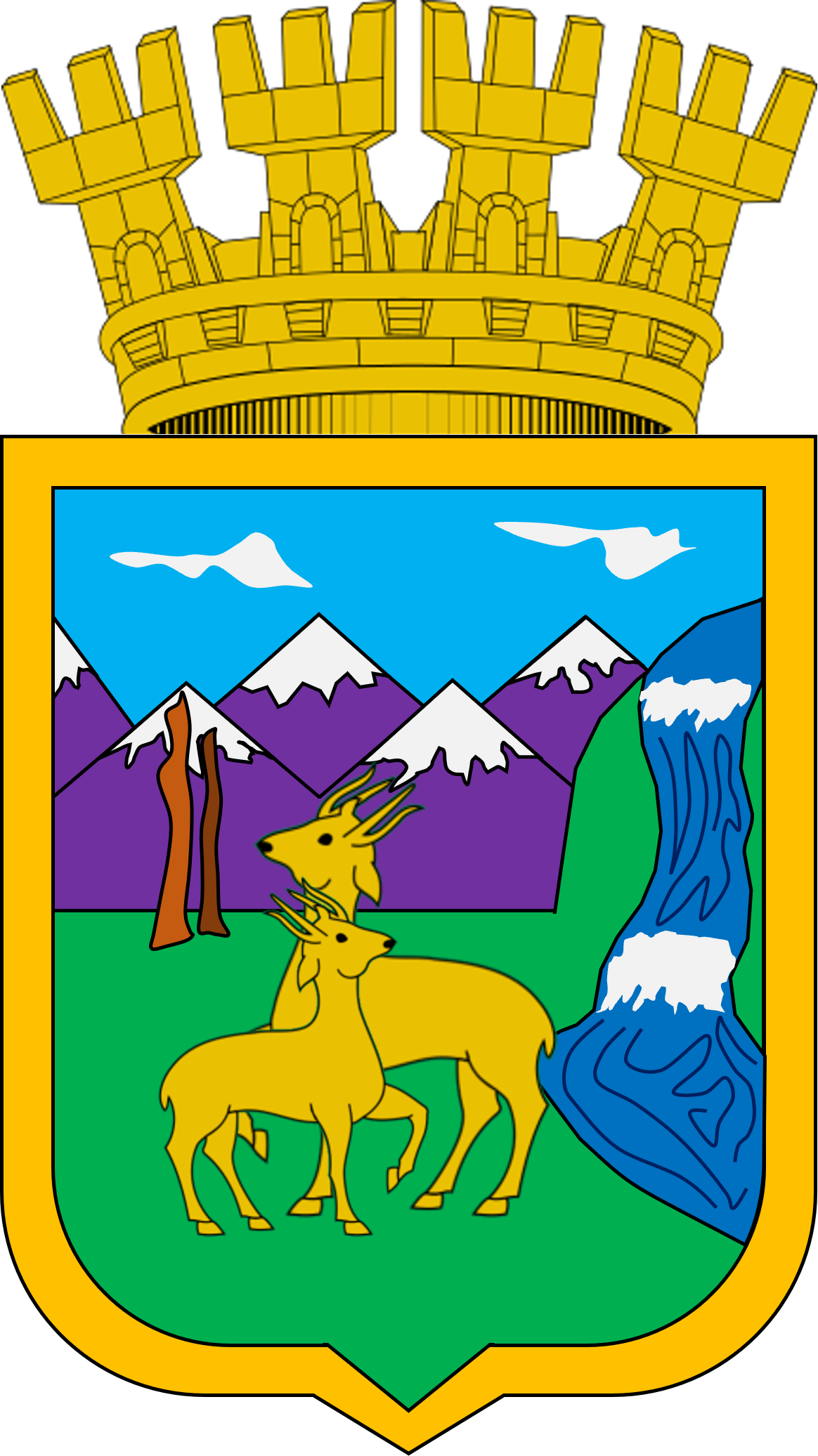
- Flag Coat of arms Map of Cochrane commune in Aisén Region Location in Chile Cochrane (Chile)
- Coordinates (town): 47°15′17″S 72°34′30″W
- Country: Chile
- Region: Aisén
- Province: Capitán Prat
- Founded: 1954
- Founded as: Pueblo Nuevo de Cochrane ("New Town of Cochrane")

Government
  - Type: Municipality
  - Alcalde: Patricio Ulloa Georgia (UDI)

Area
  - Total: 8,930.5 km^{2} (3,448.1 sq mi)
- Elevation: 199 m (653 ft)

Population (2012 Census)
  - Total: 2,976
  - Density: 0.3332/km^{2} (0.8631/sq mi)
  - Urban: 2,217
  - Rural: 650

Sex
  - Men: 1,555
  - Women: 1,312
- Time zone: UTC−3 (CLT)
- Area code: +56
- Climate: Cfb
- Website: www.cochranepatagonia.cl (in Spanish)

Cochrane is a Chilean town and commune in Capitán Prat Province of the Aisén Region. According to the 2002 census it has a population of 2,867. The urban population in 2002 was 2,217 and the rural population was 650.

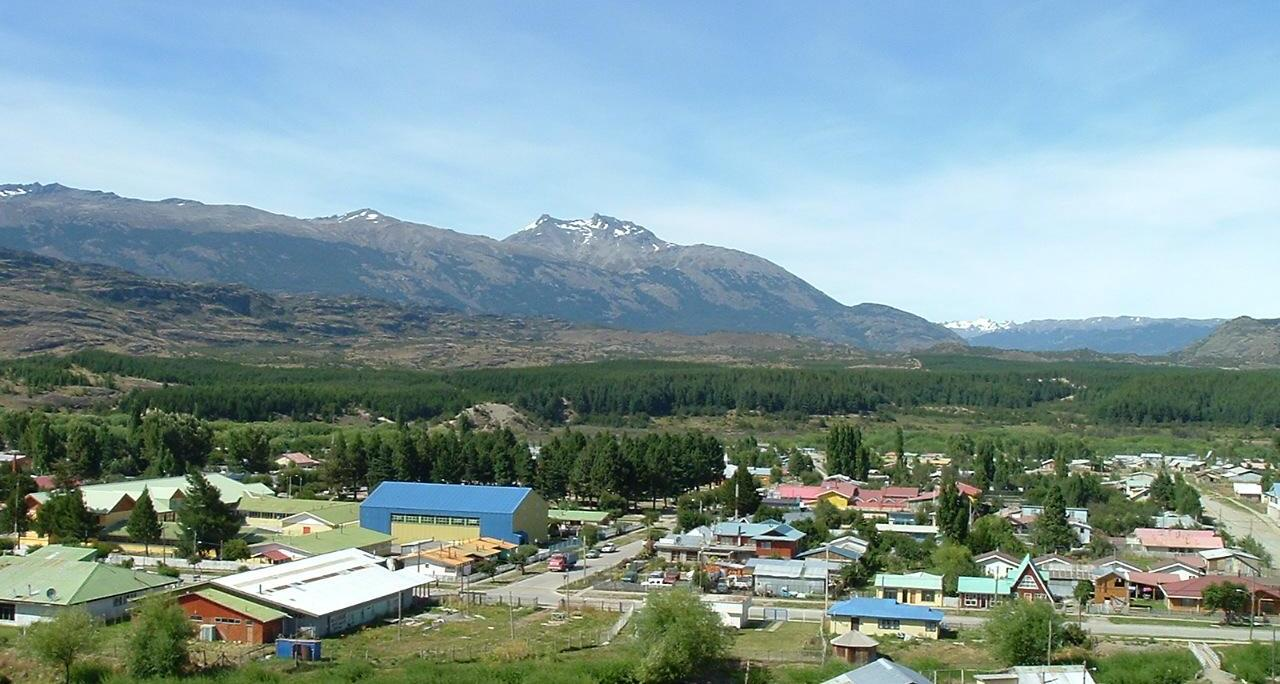
Cochrane

Cochrane was founded in 1954 (as Pueblo Nuevo), but didn't have road access to the rest of Chile until 1988, when the Carretera Austral was opened. The town was later named Cochrane in honour of Thomas Cochrane, 10th Earl of Dundonald, a British naval captain and radical politician who was appointed the first Admiral of the Chilean Navy in 1818 and made a major contribution to winning independence for the young nation from Spain. Cochrane remains the southernmost town along the highway, with only a few villages south of it, among them Caleta Tortel and Villa O'Higgins. Cochrane is just south of the newly established Patagonia National Park. The center of town includes a park surrounded by various shops, including a general store, a bakery, a small supermarket, a tourist information kiosk, and more.

Reportedly, the many pines in the city square of Cochrane were planted on a suggestion dictator Augusto Pinochet made during one of his annual visits to the Carretera Austral. Nearby is the prominent peak of Monte San Lorenzo, also known as Cerro Cochrane.

== Demographics ==
Historical population
Year	Pop.	±% p.a.
1970	1,794	—
1982	2,161	+1.56%
1992	2,996	+3.32%
2002	2,867	−0.44%
2017	3,490	+1.32%
2024	3,458	−0.13%
Source: "Censo de Población y Vivienda". National Statistics Institute.

According to the 2002 census of the National Statistics Institute, Cochrane spans an area of 8,930.5 km^{2} (3,448 sq mi) and has 2,867 inhabitants (1,555 men and 1,312 women). Of these, 2,217 (77.3%) lived in urban areas and 650 (22.7%) in rural areas. The population fell by 4.3% (129 persons) between the 1992 and 2002 censuses.

== Administration ==
As a commune, Cochrane is a third-level administrative division of Chile administered by a municipal council, headed by an alcalde who is directly elected every four years. The 2008-2012 alcalde is Patricio Ulloa Georgia (UDI). The council has the following members:

- María Quijanes Millao (PRSD)
- Lindor Lopez Cruces (RN)
- Jorge Patricio Abello Moll (ILC)
- Patricia Quintana Cruces (ILE)
- Tatiana Aguilera Lopez (ILC)
- Andres Chavarria Alarcon (ILE)

Within the electoral divisions of Chile, Cochrane is represented in the Chamber of Deputies by René Alinco (PDC) and David Sandoval (UDI) as part of the 59th electoral district, which includes the entire Aisén Region. The commune is represented in the Senate by Antonio Horvath Kiss (RN) and Patricio Walker Prieto (PDC) as part of the 18th senatorial constituency (18).

== Climate ==
Cochrane has an oceanic climate (Köppen Cfb) with drying trend in summer. Owing to its location in a valley behind the Northern Patagonian Ice Field, it is shielded from the heavy rainfall caused by the Humboldt Current, but the precipitation is still relatively abundant and able to support forest, unlike further east in Argentinian Patagonia. The record high is 36.1 °C (97.0 °F) in February 2019 and the record low is −16.2 °C (2.8 °F) in July 1995.

Climate data for Cochrane (1970–2000, extremes 1970–present)
Month	Jan	Feb	Mar	Apr	May	Jun	Jul	Aug	Sep	Oct	Nov	Dec	Year
Record high °C (°F)	35.0 (95.0)	36.1 (97.0)	31.4 (88.5)	24.8 (76.6)	19.0 (66.2)	16.4 (61.5)	16.2 (61.2)	16.6 (61.9)	22.4 (72.3)	24.8 (76.6)	28.0 (82.4)	32.0 (89.6)	36.1 (97.0)
Mean daily maximum °C (°F)	19.3 (66.7)	19.4 (66.9)	16.9 (62.4)	12.7 (54.9)	7.8 (46.0)	4.1 (39.4)	4.2 (39.6)	7.3 (45.1)	11.2 (52.2)	14.2 (57.6)	16.4 (61.5)	18.1 (64.6)	12.6 (54.7)
Daily mean °C (°F)	15.6 (60.1)	15.3 (59.5)	13.0 (55.4)	9.3 (48.7)	5.1 (41.2)	1.9 (35.4)	1.8 (35.2)	4.4 (39.9)	7.9 (46.2)	10.8 (51.4)	13.0 (55.4)	14.6 (58.3)	9.4 (48.9)
Mean daily minimum °C (°F)	9.4 (48.9)	8.8 (47.8)	6.8 (44.2)	4.2 (39.6)	1.8 (35.2)	−0.7 (30.7)	−1.0 (30.2)	0.4 (32.7)	2.7 (36.9)	5.0 (41.0)	7.3 (45.1)	8.8 (47.8)	4.4 (39.9)
Record low °C (°F)	−0.3 (31.5)	0.0 (32.0)	−5.1 (22.8)	−5.8 (21.6)	−8.2 (17.2)	−15.2 (4.6)	−16.2 (2.8)	−11.8 (10.8)	−6.8 (19.8)	−4.6 (23.7)	−3.2 (26.2)	−0.6 (30.9)	−16.2 (2.8)
Average precipitation mm (inches)	42.6 (1.68)	32.6 (1.28)	47.0 (1.85)	63.7 (2.51)	83.5 (3.29)	79.5 (3.13)	84.5 (3.33)	86.5 (3.41)	56.7 (2.23)	47.0 (1.85)	43.8 (1.72)	47.1 (1.85)	714.5 (28.13)
Average precipitation days	9	8	9	10	13	11	12	12	9	8	9	9	119
Average relative humidity (%)	51	52	59	66	76	81	77	69	60	55	53	52	63
Source: Dirección Meteorológica de Chile
