= Contao, Chile =

Contao
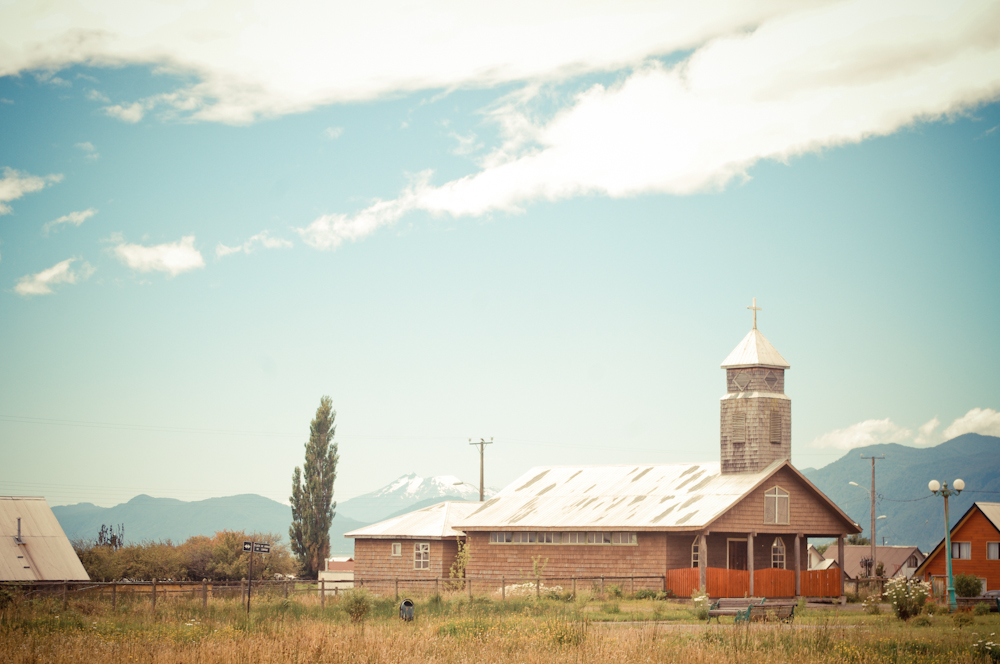
- Church of Contao
- Interactive map of Contao
- Coordinates: 41°48′9″S 72°43′7.32″W
- Region: Los Lagos
- Province: Palena
- Municipalidad: Hualaihué
- Comuna: Hualaihué

Government
  - Type: Municipalidad
  - Alcalde: Freddy Ibacache Muñoz
- Elevation: 7 m (23 ft)

Population (2017 census )
  - Total: 671
- Time zone: UTC−04:00 (Chilean Standard)
  - Summer (DST): UTC−03:00 (Chilean Daylight)
- Area code: Country + town = 56 + 65

Contao is a village (Spanish: aldea) in the southeastern shore of Reloncaví Sound in southern Chile. It lies along the northernmost portion of Carretera Austral. It had 671 inhabitants as of 2017. In colonial times Contao was a place of Fitzroya logging.

The village is served by Contao Airport.
