= Merino Jarpa Island =

Coordinates: 47.9000°S 74.3300°W

Native name: Isla Merino Jarpa

Geography
- Adjacent to: Pacific Ocean
- Area: 430 km^{2} (170 sq mi)
- Coastline: 191.1 km (118.74 mi)

Administration
- Chile
- Region: Aisén

Additional information
- NGA UFI=-892306

Merino Jarpa Island is an island in the Baker Channel in Aysén Region, Chile.

== See also ==
- List of islands of Chile
