= Contao Airport =

Airport in Chile

- IATA: none; ICAO: SCCK

Summary
- Airport type: Public
- Serves: Contao (es), Chile
- Elevation AMSL: 10 ft / 3 m
- Coordinates: 41°48′00″S 72°43′17″W

Map
- Location of Contao Airport in Chile

Runways
Direction	Length		Surface
Direction	m	ft	Surface
04/22	597	1,959	Grass
- Source: Landings.com Google Maps GCM

Contao Airport Spanish: Aeropuerto de Contao, (ICAO: SCCK) is an airport serving Contao, a village in the Los Lagos Region of Chile.

The village is on the shore of the Reloncaví Sound, and approach and departures are along the shoreline. There is mountainous terrain east of the runway.

The Puerto Montt VOR-DME (Ident: MON) is located across the sound, 27.8 nautical miles (51.5 km) northwest of the airport.

== See also ==
- Transport in Chile
- List of airports in Chile
