= Villa O'Higgins =

- Town
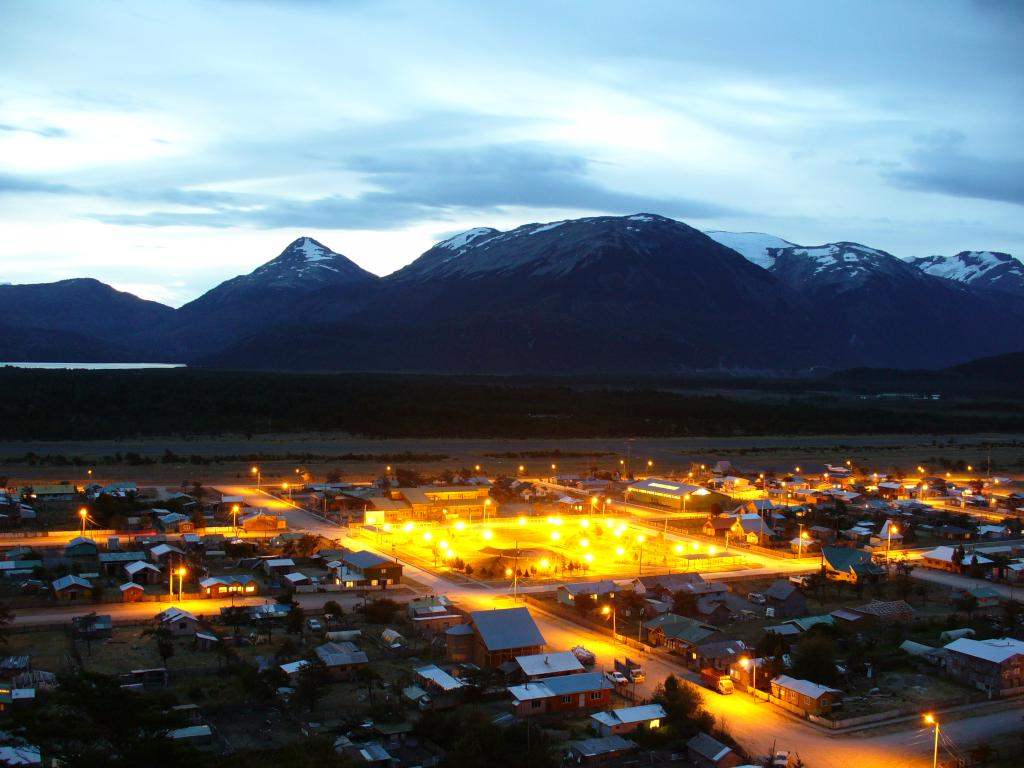
- Villa O'Higgins at dawn

- Location within Chile
- Coordinates: 48°28.1′S 72°33.6′W
- Country: Chile
- Region: Aysen
- Province: Capitán Prat
- Commune: O'Higgins

Population (2012)
  - Total: 612
- Climate: Cfb
- Website: http://www.municipalidadohiggins.cl/

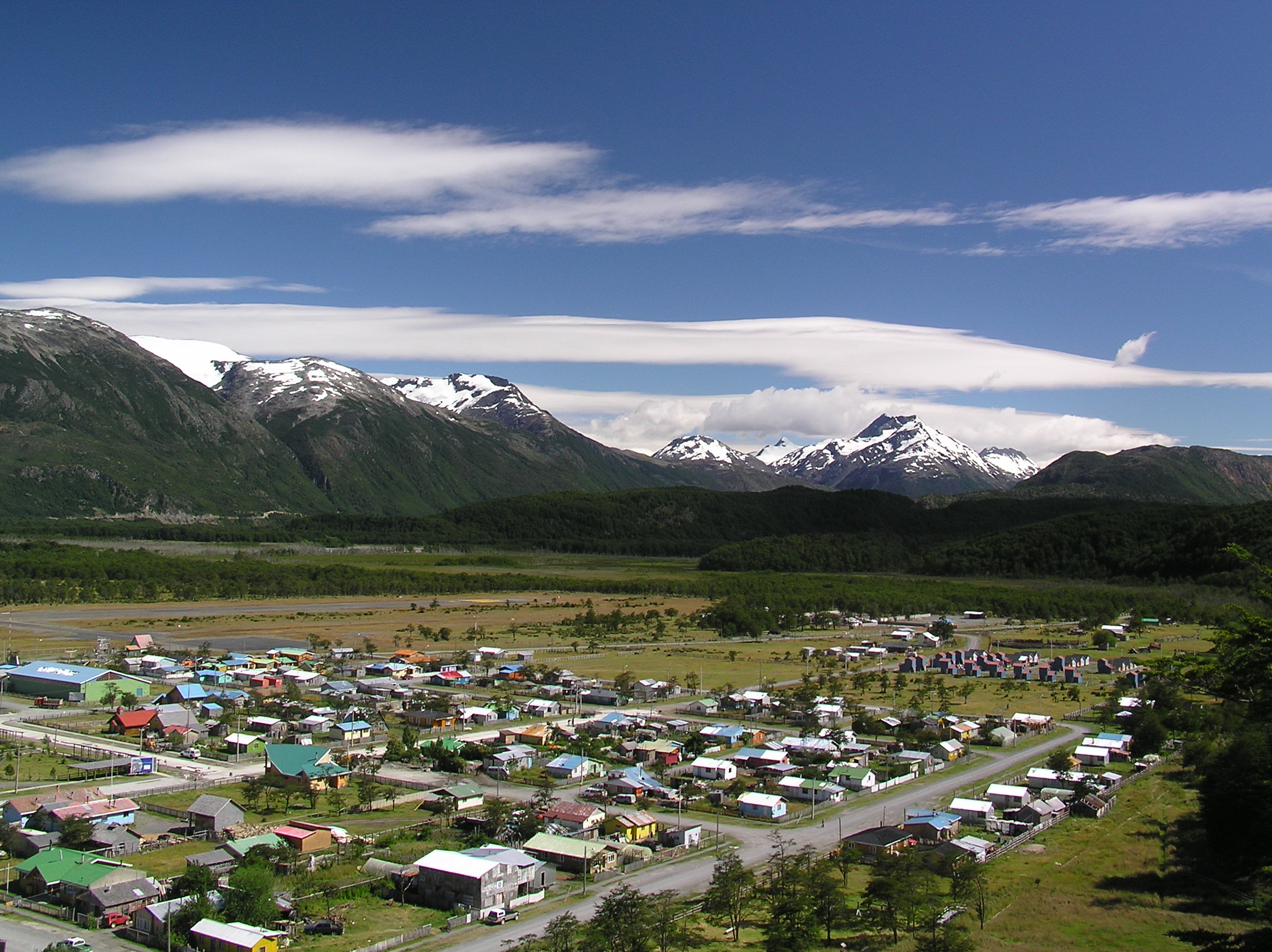
Villa O'Higgins

Villa O'Higgins is a small town in the Aysén Region of southern Chile, located 220 km south of Cochrane and 550 km south of Coyhaique. Founded in 1966 and named after the Chilean independence hero Bernardo O'Higgins, it is the capital of the O'Higgins commune of Capitán Prat Province.

Villa O'Higgins is connected to the rest of Chile by the Carretera Austral (Southern Highway) – the final 120 km of which were completed southwards from Puerto Yungay in 2000 – and is the gateway to the Southern Patagonian Ice Field.

== Facilities ==
The town has an airport, several guesthouses and campsites, a radio station, and a number of shops and restaurants. In the summer (Dec-Feb) a regular boat service takes passengers from Villa O'Higgins across the O'Higgins / San Martín Lake to Candelario Mancilla, from where it is possible to cross the border into Argentina via a footpath (no road). In bad weather, the service can be suspended for many days.

== Climate ==
Villa O'Higgins has an oceanic climate (Köppen Cfb) characterised by pleasant, though very windy, summers and chilly winters.

Climate data for Villa O'Higgins (1993-2008)
Month	Jan	Feb	Mar	Apr	May	Jun	Jul	Aug	Sep	Oct	Nov	Dec	Year
Mean daily maximum °C (°F)	16.7 (62.1)	18.2 (64.8)	15.4 (59.7)	11.1 (52.0)	8.3 (46.9)	5.4 (41.7)	5.2 (41.4)	7.2 (45.0)	9.8 (49.6)	12.0 (53.6)	13.8 (56.8)	15.7 (60.3)	11.6 (52.9)
Mean daily minimum °C (°F)	7.9 (46.2)	7.9 (46.2)	6.1 (43.0)	3.9 (39.0)	1.1 (34.0)	−0.7 (30.7)	−0.8 (30.6)	0.3 (32.5)	1.8 (35.2)	3.6 (38.5)	5.5 (41.9)	7.0 (44.6)	3.6 (38.5)
Average precipitation mm (inches)	69 (2.7)	42 (1.7)	79 (3.1)	95 (3.7)	85 (3.3)	92 (3.6)	89 (3.5)	60 (2.4)	60 (2.4)	77 (3.0)	69 (2.7)	72 (2.8)	887 (34.9)
Source: Atlas Agroclimatico de Chile
