= Pascua River =

River in Chile

Coordinates: 48°14′S 73°16′W

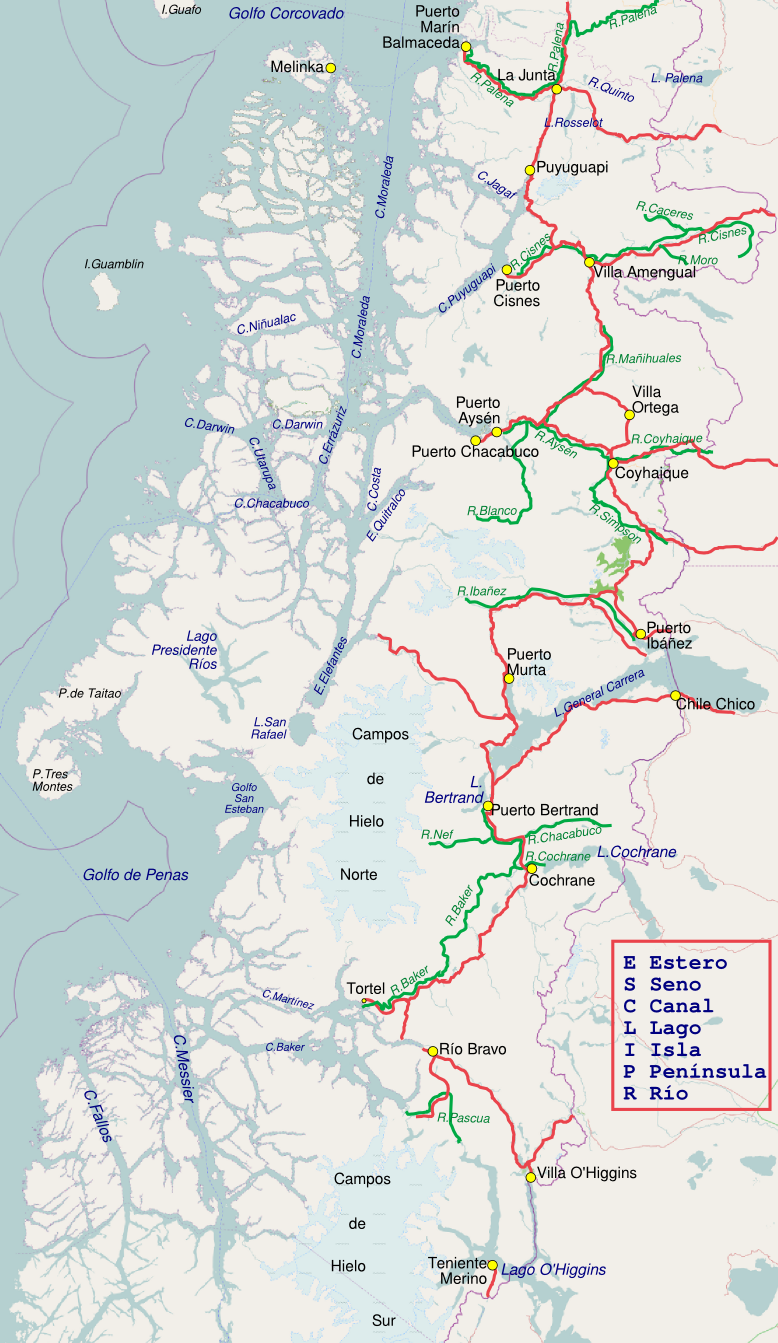
- Pascua River in the Aysén Region

Location
- Country: Chile

Physical characteristics
- Source
  - location: O'Higgins/San Martín Lake
- Mouth
  - location: Baker Channel, Pacific Ocean
- Length: 62 km (39 mi)
- Basin size: 14,760 km^{2} (5,700 sq mi)
- Discharge
  - average: 574 m^{3}/s (20,300 cu ft/s)

The Pascua River is a river located in the Aysén del General Carlos Ibáñez del Campo Region of Chile. In spite of being a short river, its drainage basin is the seventh-largest in the country due to the great size of the O'Higgins/San Martín Lake, its source.

The Pascua River was discovered in 1898 by the German Hans Steffen, during the exploration of the area near Christmas time (Pascua means Easter but is frequently used to describe Christmas in Chilean Spanish, thus explaining the origin of its name). The river has its source in the northern part of the north-west arm of the lake O'Higgins in the form of a small stream, in an area surrounded by steep-sided mountains that reach over 1,000 meters with glaciers spilling down to the lake or to the river.

The river flows quickly forming rapids until it creates a cascade in the place where it falls into the Chico Lake. After leaving this lake, the river forms a new cascade and rushes furiously, preventing any type of navigation on its waters. Then the river is joined by the "Quiroz River" from the left, whose origin is the glacier of the same name, increasing its width in a valley of about 10 kilometers wide, which allows the development of large meanders and some marshy and peaty zones.

After 62 km, the Pascua River ends in a wide delta that empties into the Baker Channel, previously having rushed in a last area of rapids.

Due to its hydrographic conditions, the Pascua River has a hydroelectric potential of great importance. There exists a controversial Endesa project to construct two massive power dams on the course of the river, but the proposal has generated immediate opposition from a great part of the population and in the government authorities, due to the serious ecological damage that would cause in the zone.

== Gallery ==
O'Higgins-San Martín Lake, Rio Pascua and Calén Fjord (view from ISS)

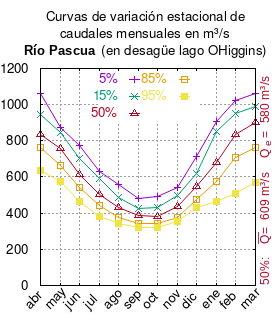
Total flow of Pascua River at different seasons
