= Jorge Montt Glacier =

Glacier in Chile

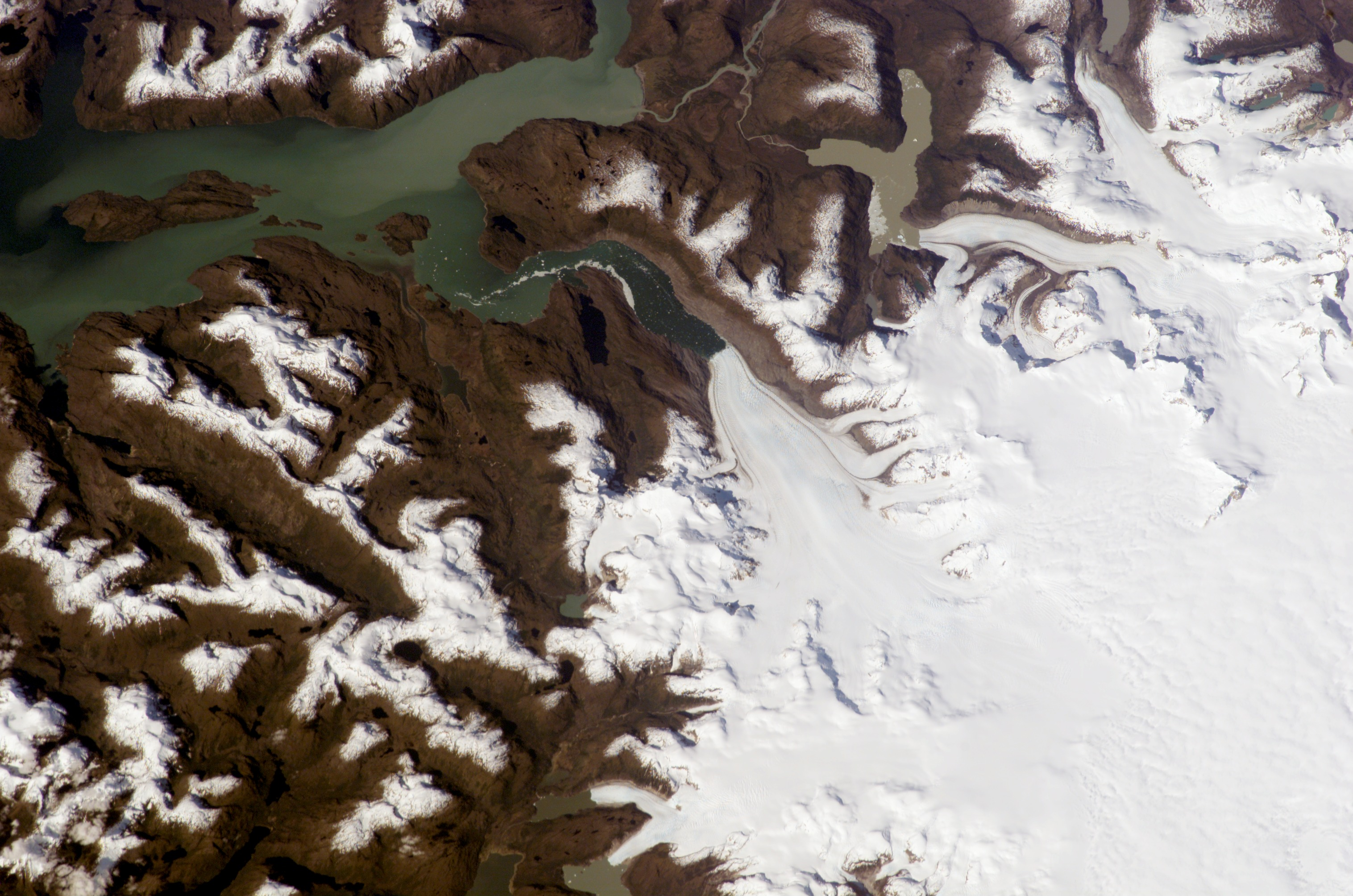
- Interactive map of Jorge Montt Glacier
- Type: Tidewater glacier
- Location: Chile
- Coordinates: 48°22′S 73°30′W
- Area: 464 km^{2} (179 sq mi)
- Terminus: Sealevel
- Status: Retreating

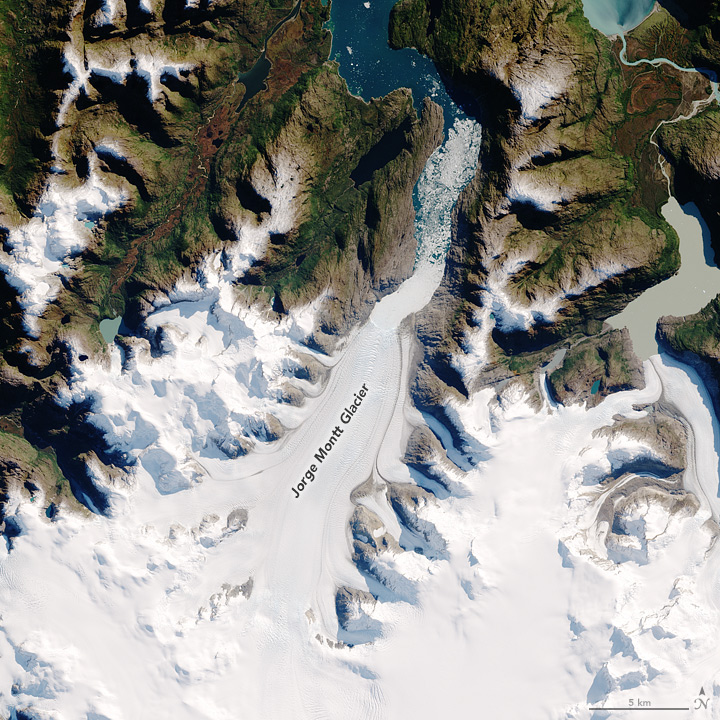
Jorge Montt glacier from Landsat, 2016. The glacier flows south to north and empties into a fjord (note icebergs) that turns west to the Pacific Ocean, offscreen. Click on image for further details.

Jorge Montt Glacier is a tidewater glacier located in the Aisén Region of Chile, south of the town of Caleta Tortel. It lies at the north end of the Southern Patagonian Ice Field, within Bernardo O'Higgins National Park. The mouth of Pascua River is located in the vicinity of the glacier calving front.

The total drainage area of the glacier is about 510 km^{2} (200 sq mi). The glacier's ice is thinning most at low elevations, where air temperature is the highest. Ice thinning between 1975 and 2000 averaged 3.3 m (11 ft) per year over the entire glacier, and reached 18 m (59 ft) per year at the lowest elevations. The glacier calving front experienced a major retreat of 8.5 km (5.3 mi) in those 25 years as a result of rapid thinning. The glacier calves off icebergs into the Baker Channel.

In 2000, NASA wrote: Conventional topographic data from the 1970s and 1990s were compared with data from NASA's February 2000 Shuttle Radar Topography Mission to measure changes in the volumes of the 63 largest glaciers in the region over time. The researchers concluded the thinning rate of the Patagonia Icefields more than doubled during the period from 1995 through 2000 versus the period from 1975 to 2000.

In December 2011, a new study was published. "The study was presented by glaciologist and CECs researcher Andrés Rivera, who focused his investigation on changes in the glacier between February 2010 and January 2011. Using a series of 1,445 photos taken throughout this period, scientists found that the glacier shrank roughly 82 feet each day, receding more than half a mile in the course of the year."

Rivera's study showed the glacier's unique rate of retreat was primarily a function of the fjord's peculiar bathymetry; secondarily a result of a warming climate. In 2010 remnants of nothofagus (southern beech) were discovered and later dated, "yielding burial ages between 460 and 250 cal yrs BP." According to Rivera: "The tree-ring results suggest the area was covered by an old-growth forest dominated by Nothofagus betuloides ("coigue de Magallanes" – Magellanic southern beech) with individuals of average age close to 150 years, co-existing for almost 300 years (total chronology length). The radiocarbon ages of between 250 and 450 years BP from two of the sampled trees suggest that the tree ring samples were taken from a mature forest that was destroyed by the advance of Glaciar Jorge Montt during the LIA period."

== See also ==
- List of glaciers
- Retreat of glaciers since 1850
