= Carretera Austral =

Highway in Chile

Carretera Austral
- Ruta 7
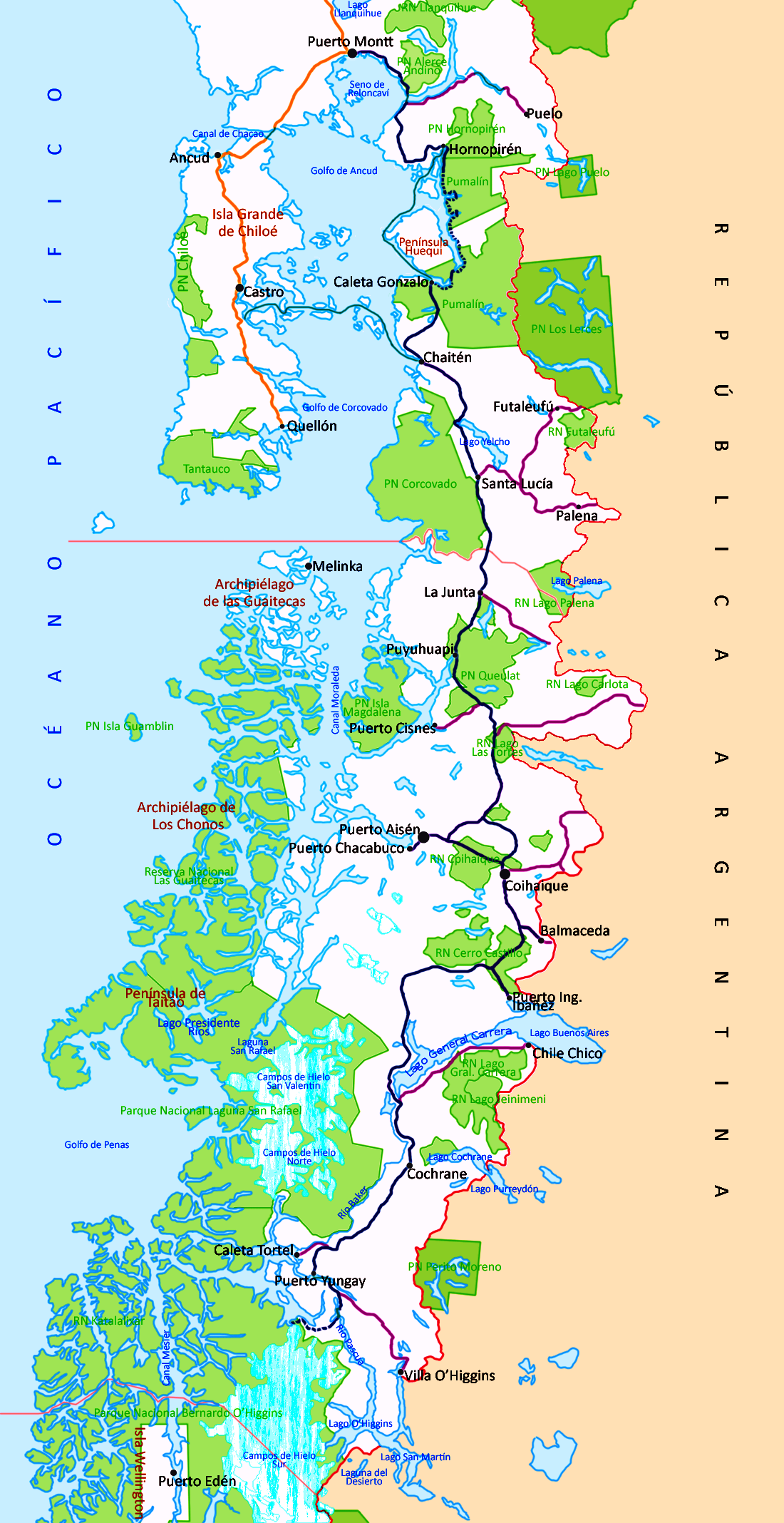
- Path of the highway. The dashed lines indicate unfinished part near Hornopirén

Location
- Country: Chile

Highway system
- Highways in Chile

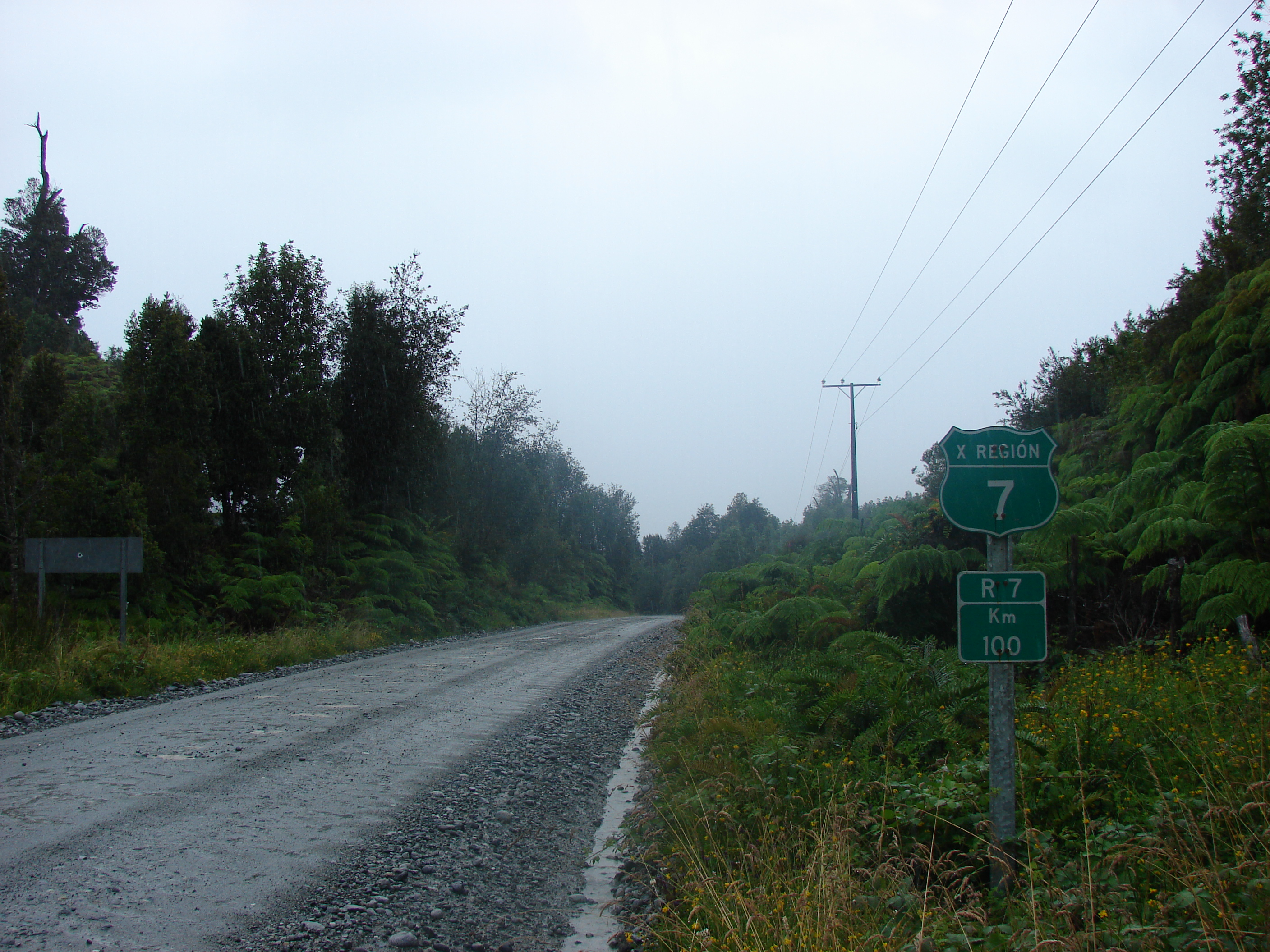
Ruta 7 at the southbound 100 km (62 mi) marker.

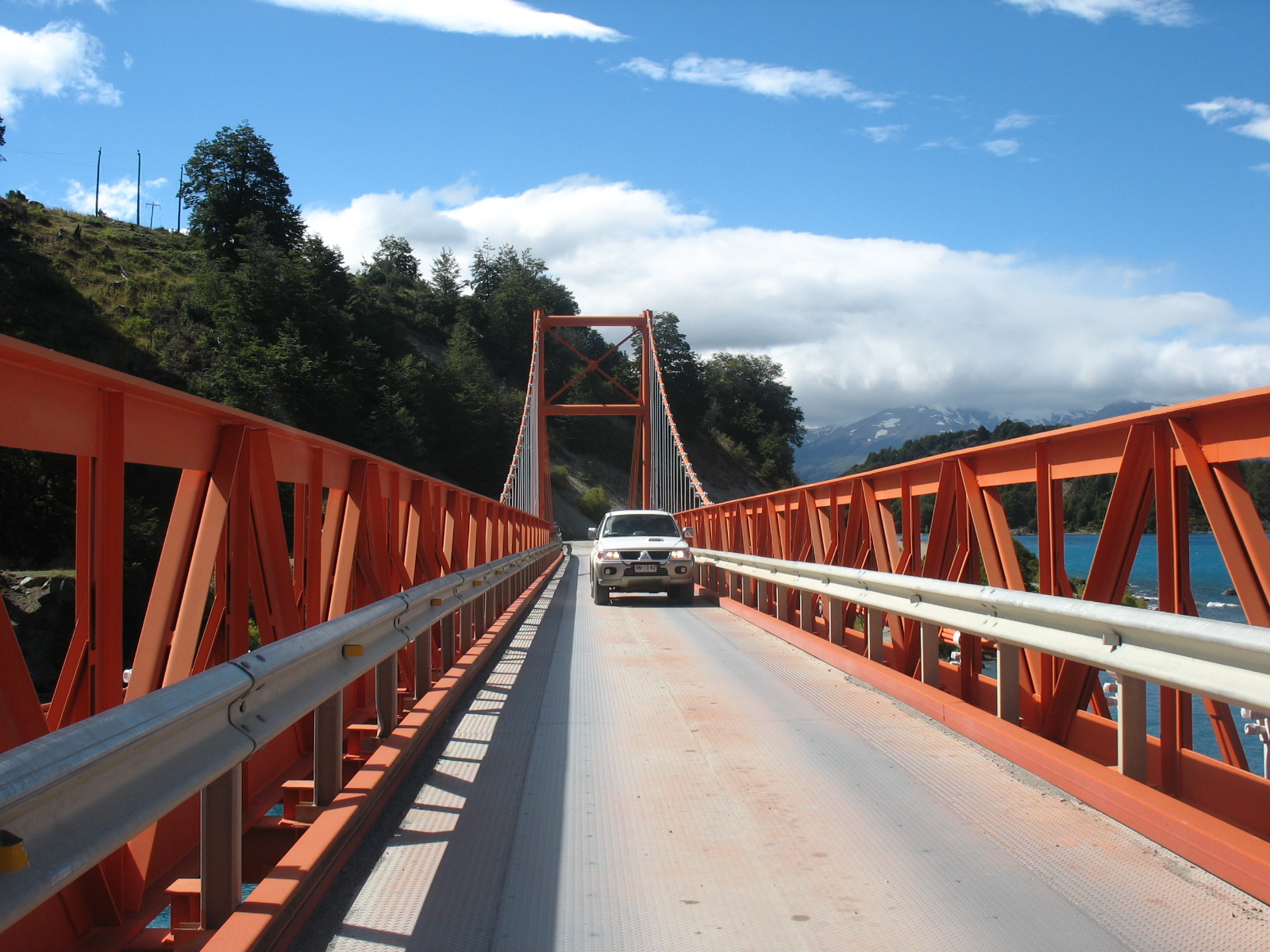
General Carrera Bridge.

The Carretera Austral (CH-7, in English: Southern Way) is the name given to Chile's Route 7. The highway runs south for about 1,240 kilometers (770 mi) from Puerto Montt to Villa O'Higgins, passing through rural Patagonia.

Carretera Austral provides road access to Chile's Aysén Region and southern parts of Los Lagos Region. These areas are sparsely populated and despite its length, Carretera Austral provides access to only about 100,000 people. The largest city along the entire road is Coyhaique with a population of 53,715 in 2010.

== History ==
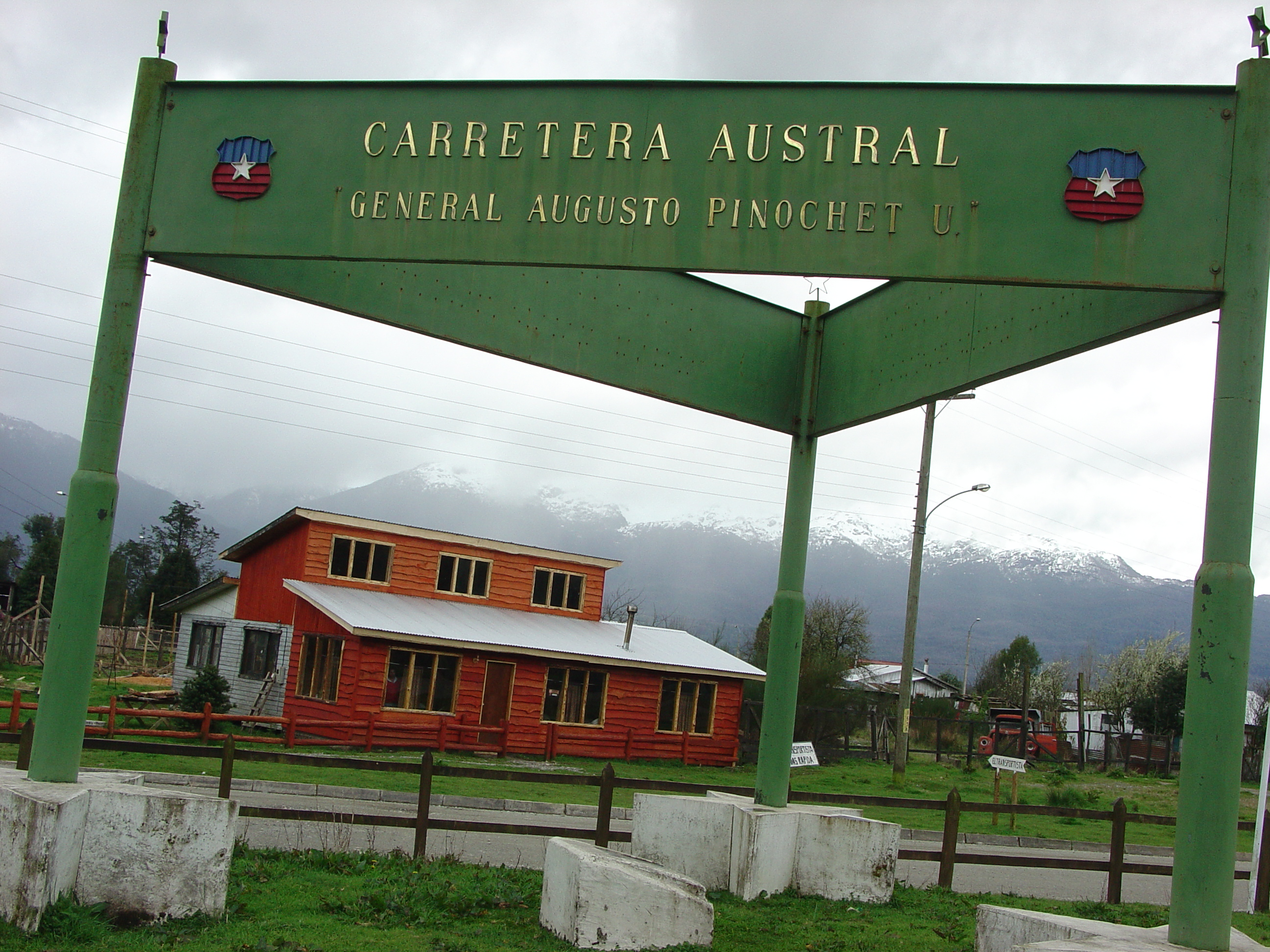
Sign with its full unofficial original name.

Construction of the highway was commenced in 1976 under the military dictatorship era in order to connect a number of remote communities. Before that, in the 1950s and 1970s, there had been unsuccessful attempts to build access roads in the region. It is among the most ambitious infrastructure projects developed in Chile during the 20th century. The engineering corps of the Chilean Army used thousands of conscripts from 1975 to 1985 to build the road. Dictator Augusto Pinochet is said to have made annual visits well into the 1990s to follow the progress of the road. General Hernán Abad was for long in charge of its construction.

As it was constructed during the military dictatorship, the Carretera Austral bears the unofficial name of the Augusto Pinochet highway.

Carretera Austral has a strategic meaning due to the difficult access by land to a significant portion of Chile's southern territory. This area is characterized by thick forests, fjords, glaciers, channels and steep mountains. Access by sea and air is also a complex task due to extreme winter weather conditions. For decades, most of the land transportation had to cross the border to Argentina in order to reach again Chile's Patagonia. These difficulties were deepened during the 1970s due to the Beagle Conflict. In order to strengthen the Chilean presence in these isolated territories and ensure the land connection to the rest of the country, the government planned the construction of this road, which was executed by the Chilean Army's Engineering Command. More than 10,000 soldiers worked on its construction.

The highway opened to traffic in 1988, and by 1996 was completed to Puerto Yungay. The last 100 kilometers (62 mi) to Villa O'Higgins were opened in 2000. In 2003, a branch road to Caleta Tortel was finished.

In 1980, the Ministry of Public Works planned the segment that would connect Aysén with Magallanes, designated as Route 8, but it has not yet been built.

== Places along the highway ==
- Puerto Montt
- Reloncaví Sound
  - Chamiza Wetland
- Contao
- Hornopirén (Río Negro)
- Hornopirén National Park
- Yelcho Lake
- Pumalín Park
- Chaitén
- Queulat National Park
- Coyhaique
- Balmaceda
- Río Ibáñez
- Cerro Castillo
- General Carrera Lake
- Cochrane
- Baker River
- Confluence of the Baker River and the Nef River
- Patagonia Park
- Caleta Tortel
- Villa O'Higgins

== Ferry crossings ==
Traveling the entire route requires the use of three ferry services:

1. A 40-minute crossing about 45 kilometers (28 mi) south of the start of the highway in Puerto Montt, between Fishing Creeks Caleta La Arena and "Puelche". This ferry service runs 24/7 with departures approximately every 30 minutes during the day (while at night the activity decreases). During the summer (Dec–Feb) the number of departures is increased with boardings at every 15, 30 and 45 minutes. Passengers without a vehicle can board for free throughout the year.
2. a 5-hour crossing from Hornopiren (110 kilometers (68 miles) south of Puerto Montt) to Caleta Gonzalo, which requires passengers to purchase tickets prior to boarding.
3. a 50-minute crossing from Puerto Yungay to Rio Bravo, connecting to the final 100 kilometers (62 mi) of the highway.

== Current activity ==
The highway began as almost entirely unpaved, but more sections are becoming paved each year. As of March 2018, the paved road ends at Villa Cerro Castillo, with roadworks going on just south of there.

There is also a plan to extend the road to Magallanes Region, which still lacks domestic road connection to the rest of Chile. This means constructing a 935-kilometre (581 mi) branch Rio Bravo-Ventisquero Montt-Puerto Natales, with 9 ferry crossings planned. By January 2007, the construction on the Rio Bravo-Ventisquero Montt section had begun, with the branch off point from the main Rio Bravo-Villa O'Higgins road being at 48.00°S 73.13°W.

== Gallery ==
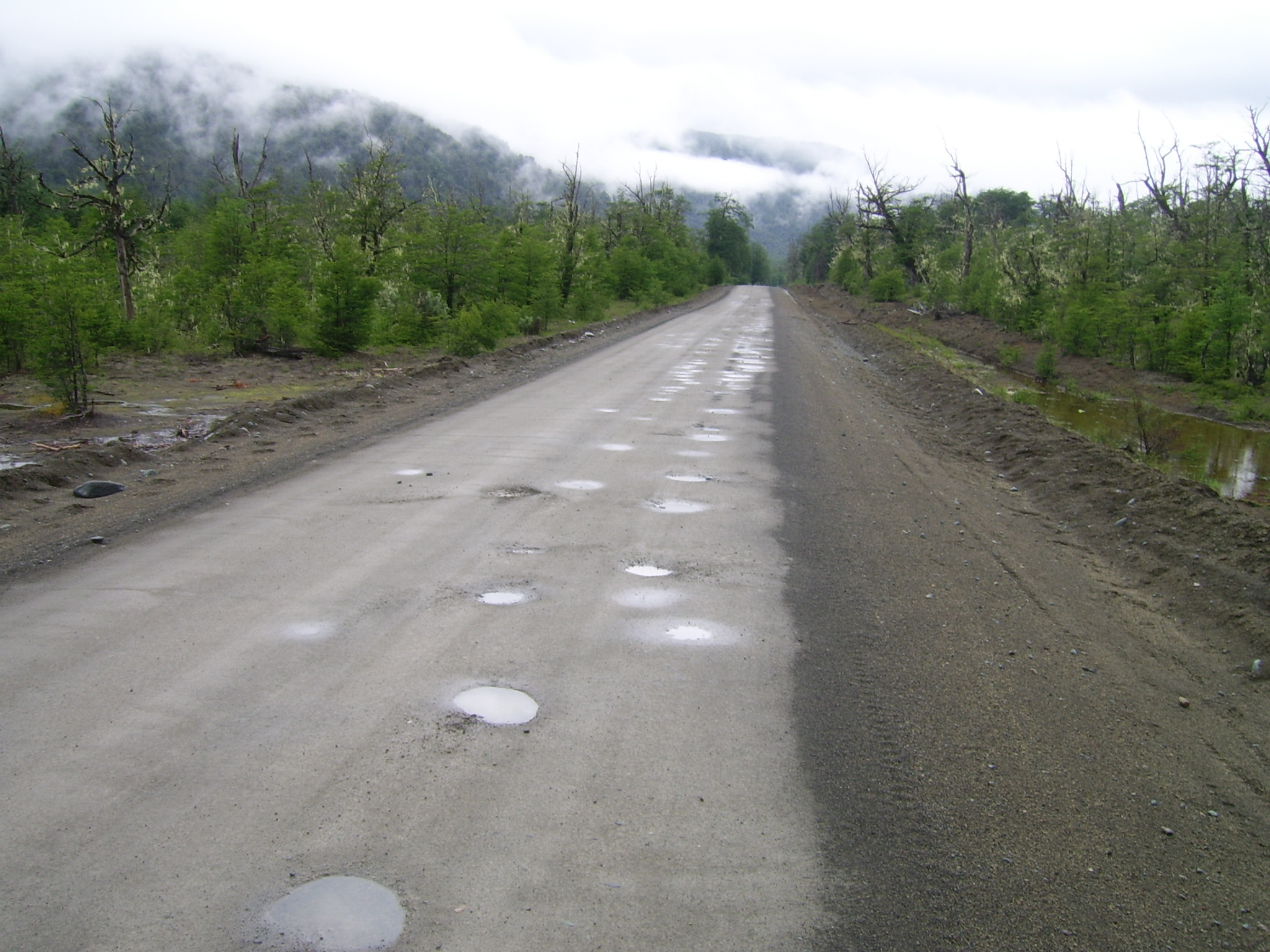
Carretera Austral near Caleta Gonzalo

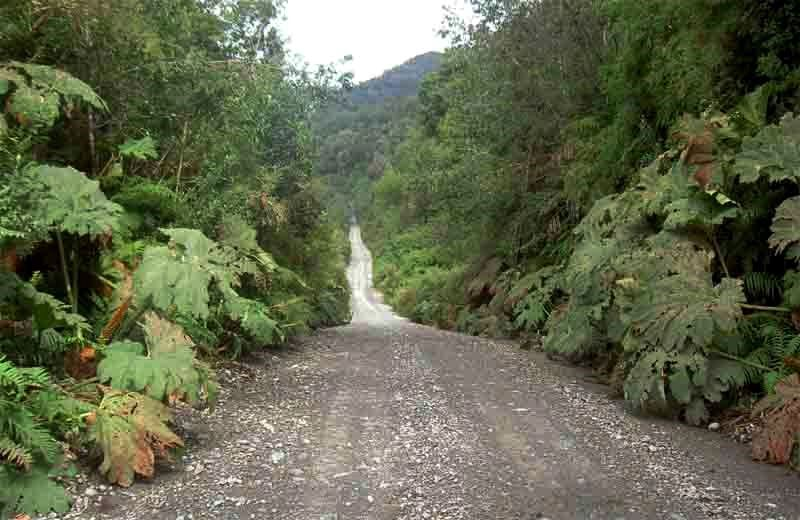
Carretera Austral near Caleta Gonzalo

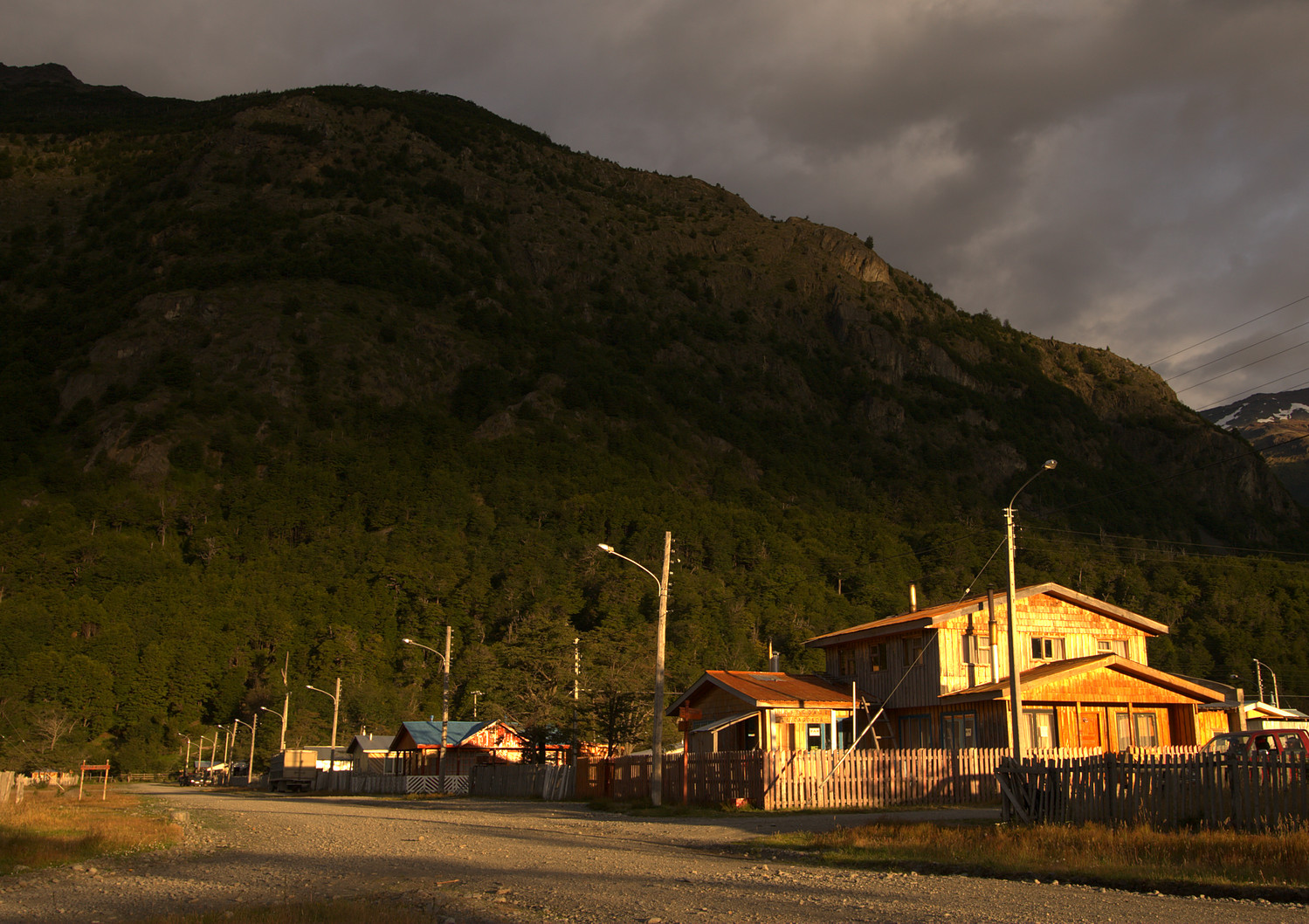
Villa O'Higgins, the end of Carretera Austral
