= Capitán Prat Province =

Capitán Prat Province Provincia de Capitán Prat
- Province
- Seal

- Location in the Aysén del General Carlos Ibáñez del Campo Region

- Location in Chile
- Coordinates: 48°00′S 73°25′W
- Country: Chile
- Region: Aysén
- Named for: Arturo Prat
- Capital: Cochrane
- Communes: Cochrane; O'Higgins; Tortel

Government
  - Type: Provincial

Area
  - Total: 37,043.6 km^{2} (14,302.6 sq mi)

Population (2024 Census)
  - Total: 4,610
  - Density: 0.124/km^{2} (0.322/sq mi)
- Time zone: UTC−4 (CLT)
  - Summer (DST): UTC-3 (CLST)
- Area code: 56 + 67
- Website: Government of Capitán Prat

Capitán Prat Province (Spanish: Provincia de Capitán Prat) is a province in the Aysén Region of Chile. Its capital is Cochrane. Covering an area of 37,043.6 km^{2} (14,302.6 sq mi), it had a population of 4,610 inhabitants to the 2024 Chilean census. It is named after Arturo Prat.

== History ==
The region was originally occupied by indigenous groups, with archeological evidence pointing to human habitation dating back 7,700 years. Cochrane was established as a settlement in 1929 by cattle ranchers, and was officially founded in March 1954. The Aysén Region was established on July 10, 1974, by Law No. 575, which reorganised Chile into thirteen regions. The region is divided into four provinces–Capitán Prat, Aysén, Coyhaique and General Carrera, which are further divided into ten communes.

== Geography ==
Capitán Prat Province is one of the four provinces of the Aysén Region in Chile. It covers an area of 37,043.6 km^{2} (14,302.6 sq mi). It is located in the southernmost end of the Aysén Region in the Chilean Patagonia. About 45% of the land of the province is situated in the Baker and Easter River basins. Of the remaining land, 30% are coastal lands, and 25% consists of coastal islands.

The province is nicknamed as "Province of Glaciers" due to the presence of mountains, ice fields, and glaciers. Major glaciers include Calluqueo, Steffen, and Jorge Montt Glaciers. Lake Cochrane National Reserve, and Patagonia National Park form part of the province. O'Higgins Lake, the deepest lake in the Americas, is located near the O'Higgins Glacier.

Cochrane, located on the banks of the Baker River, is the capital of the province. Cochrane has a Mediterranean climate (Köppen climate classification: Csb) with an average annual temperature of 8.97 °C (48.15 °F). The region receives approximately 3.29 cm (1.30 in) of rainfall annually on average.

== Administration ==
As a province, Capitán Prat is a second-level administrative division of Chile, governed by a provincial governor. It is further subdivided into three communes (comunas)–Cochrane, O'Higgins and Tortel.

== Demographics ==
According to the 2024 Chilean census, the province had a population of 4,610 inhabitants. The population consisted of 2,379 males (51.6%) and 2,231 females (48.4%). About 19.9% of the population was below the age of 15 years, 68.6% belonged to the age group of 15–64 years, and 11.5% was aged 65 years or older. The province had an urban population of 2,703 inhabitants (58.6%) and a rural population of 1,907 inhabitants (41.4%). Most of the residents were born in Chile, accounting for 4,521 inhabitants (98.1%). Non-indigenous people formed the majority of the population with 3,376 inhabitants (73.2%), while 1,234 inhabitants (26.8%) identified themselves as belonging to indigenous groups. Roman Catholics formed the largest religious group with 1,955 adherents (53%), followed by 1,217 inhabitants (33%) indicating no religious affiliation, and Evangelicals or Protestants with 429 adherents (11.6%).

== See also ==
- Carretera Austral
