= O'Higgins, Chile =

O'Higgins
- Commune
- Location of the O'Higgins commune in Aisén Region Location in Chile
- Coordinates: 48°28′S 72°34′W
- Country: Chile
- Region: Aisén
- Province: Capitán Prat
- Seat: Villa O'Higgins

Government
  - Type: Municipality
  - Alcalde: Roberto Guillermo Recabal Cárcamo (Ind)

Area
  - Total: 8,182.5 km^{2} (3,159.3 sq mi)
- Elevation: 269 m (883 ft)

Population (2012 Census)
  - Total: 540
  - Density: 0.066/km^{2} (0.17/sq mi)
  - Urban: 0
  - Rural: 463

Sex
  - Men: 277
  - Women: 186
- Time zone: UTC−04:00 (CLT)
  - Summer (DST): UTC−03:00 (CLST)
- Area code: 56 + 67

O'Higgins is a Chilean commune in Capitán Prat Province, located around O'Higgins Lake in the south east of Aisén Region. The commune is administered by the municipality in Villa O'Higgins, the principal settlement.

O'Higgins contains 4,338—or 28.5%—of Aysén Region's 15,240 ha of Sphagnum bogs.

== Demographics ==
Historical population
Year	Pop.	±% p.a.
1970	226	—
1982	284	+1.92%
1992	337	+1.73%
2002	463	+3.23%
2017	625	+2.02%
2024	647	+0.50%
Source: "Censo de Población y Vivienda". National Statistics Institute.

According to the 2002 census of the National Statistics Institute, O'Higgins spans an area of 8,182.5 km^{2} (3,159 sq mi) and has 463 inhabitants (277 men and 186 women), making the commune an entirely rural area. The population grew by 37.4% (126 persons) between the 1992 and 2002 censuses.

== Administration ==
As a commune, O'Higgins is a third-level administrative division of Chile administered by a municipal council, headed by an alcalde who is directly elected every four years. The 2008-2012 alcalde is José Fica Gómez (PDC).

Within the electoral divisions of Chile, O'Higgins is represented in the Chamber of Deputies by René Alinco (PDC) and David Sandoval (UDI) as part of the 59th electoral district, which includes the entire Aisén Region. The commune is represented in the Senate by Antonio Horvath Kiss (RN) and Patricio Walker Prieto (PDC) as part of the 18th senatorial constituency (Aisén Region).
