= O'Higgins/San Martín Lake =

Lake in Argentina and Chile

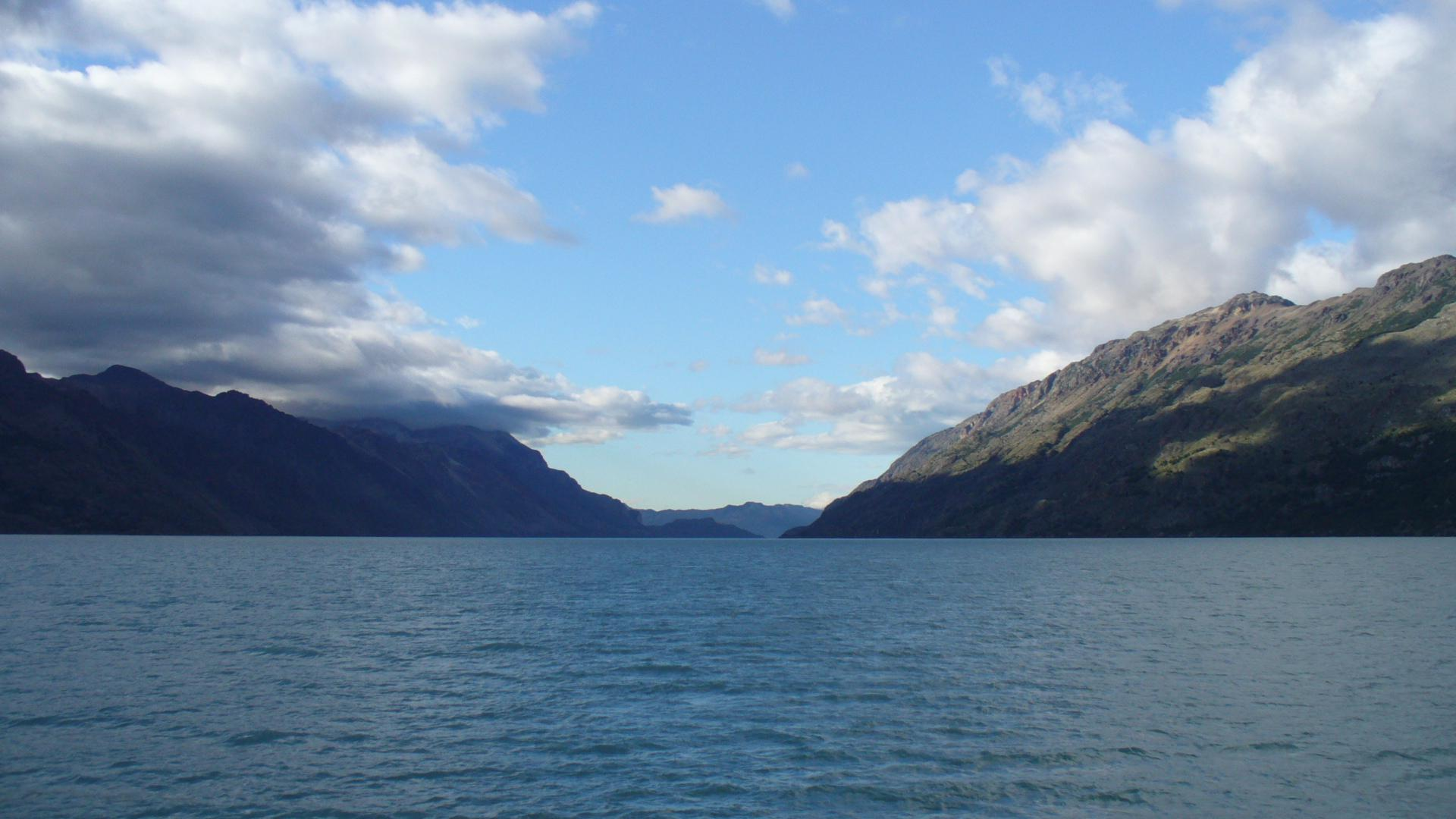

- Location within Argentina
- Interactive map of O'Higgins/San Martín Lake
- Location: O'Higgins Commune, Capitán Prat Province, Aysén Region, Chile / Lago Argentino Department, Santa Cruz Province, Argentina
- Coordinates: 48°50′S 72°36′W
- Primary inflows: Mayer River
- Primary outflows: Pascua River
- Catchment area: 12,895 km^{2} (4,979 sq mi)
- Basin countries: Argentina, Chile
- Max. length: 68 km (42 mi)
- Max. width: 61 km (38 mi)
- Surface area: 1,013 km^{2} (391 sq mi)
- Average depth: 68 m (223 ft)
- Max. depth: 799 m (2,621 ft)
- Water volume: 68.88 km^{3} (16.53 cu mi)
- Shore length^{1}: 525 km (326 mi)
- Surface elevation: 252 m (827 ft)
- Frozen: never
- Sections/sub-basins: Cancha Rayada, Chacabuco, Maipú, De la Lancha
- ^{1} Shore length is not a well-defined measure.

The lake known as O'Higgins in Chile and San Martín in Argentina is located around coordinates 48°50′S 72°36′W in Patagonia, between the Aysén Region and the Santa Cruz Province.

== General information ==
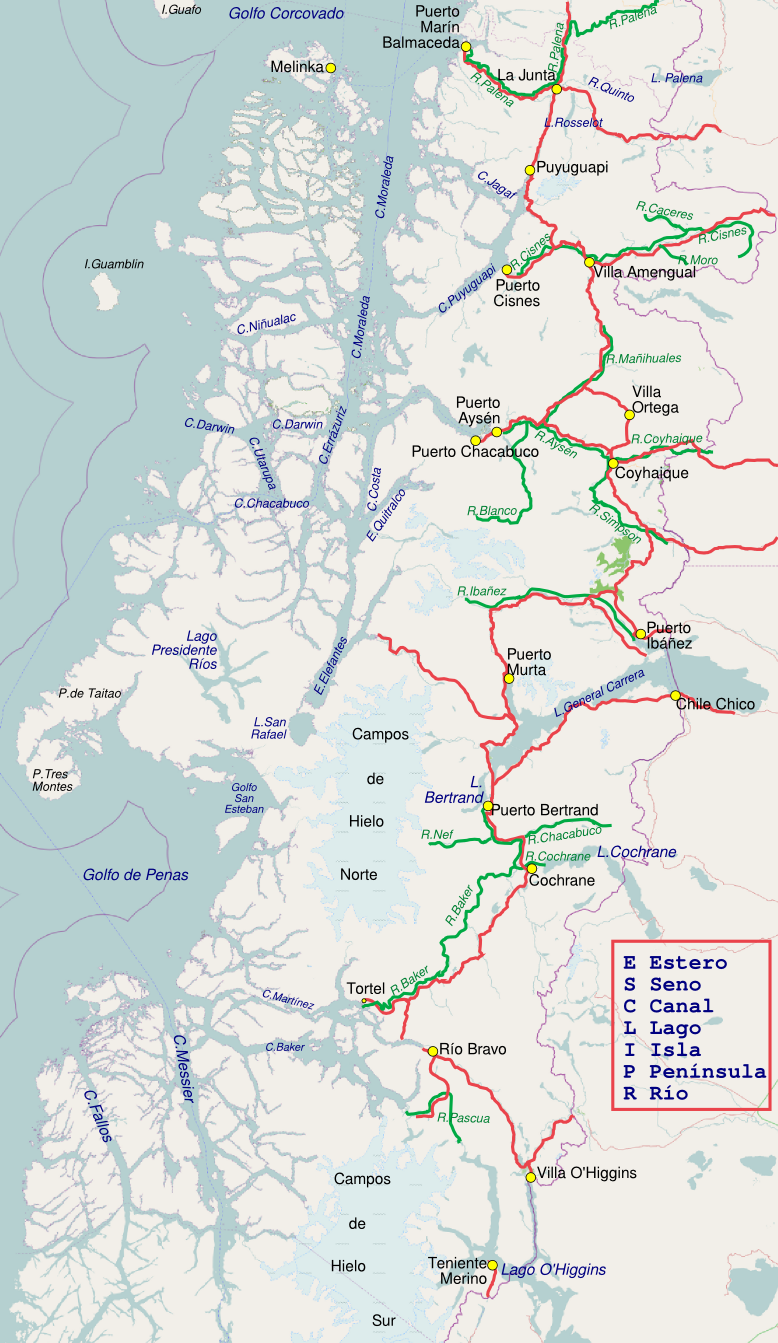
O'Higgins/San Martín Lake (bottom)

The lake has a surface area of 1,013 km^{2} (391 sq mi), an elevation of 250 m (820 ft) above mean sea level, and a shoreline length of 525 km (326 mi). Viewed from above, the lake consists of a series of finger-shaped flooded valleys, of which 554 km^{2} (214 sq mi) are in Chile and 459 km^{2} (177 sq mi) in Argentina, although sources differ on the precise split, presumably reflecting water level variability. The lake is the deepest in the Americas with a maximum depth of 799 m (2,621 ft), a decrease on a 2004 figure of 836 m (2,743 ft) recorded near O'Higgins Glacier. Its characteristic milky light-blue color comes from rock flour suspended in its waters. It is mainly fed by the Mayer River and other streams, and its outlet, the Pascua River, discharges water from the lake towards the Pacific Ocean at a rate of 510 cubic metres per second (18,000 cu ft/s). The O'Higgins Glacier flows eastwards towards the lake, as does the Chico Glacier. Both of these glaciers are part of the Southern Patagonian Ice Field which extends for approximately 350 kilometres (220 mi) in a north–south direction to the west of Lake O'Higgins/San Martín.

Immigrants did not settle in the arid, windy area around the lake until the 1910s, when British, Scandinavians and Swiss immigrants started raising sheep for wool.

The most common tourist route for visiting the lake is that between El Chaltén in Argentina and Villa O'Higgins in Chile, including a ferry through the lake on the Chilean side.

Water from O'Higgins/San Martín flows into the Pacific Ocean through the Pascua River.

== History ==
The lake was divided in the 1902 Arbitral award of the Andes between Argentina and Chile. Disregarding the Chilean agent Bolados and the Argentine agent Arenberg, the demarcator, British Colonel Herbert Leland Crosthwait placed border marker 62 south of Lake O'Higgins/San Martín using a pile of stones and a paper inside a bottle, as he was short on time.

A bottle was placed by me on pile of stones, erected as a boundary pillar between the Republics of Argentina and Chile on the south shore of lake San Martin

— H. L. Crosthwait, Captain R. E., February 28th 1903

== Names ==
Being the most irregular of the lakes in the area, consisting of eight well-defined arms, the name San Martín is sometimes used to refer only to the four Argentine arms of the lake, and O'Higgins only to the four Chilean arms. Both names come from independence heroes, José de San Martín of Argentina and Bernardo O'Higgins of Chile, who fought together for the liberation of Chile, and came to be known as Liberators of America together with other South American figures.

The four Argentine arms of the lake, with an area of 521 km^{2}, are individually named Cancha Rayada, Chacabuco, Maipú and De la Lancha, after battles of General San Martín.

== See also ==
- Cryptodepression
- Lake Viedma
- Lake Argentino
- List of international lakes
