= Apagado =

Mountain in Chile

Apagado (Hualiaque)
- The volcano is visible in the lower center of this NASA image.

Highest point
- Elevation: 1,210 m (3,970 ft)
- Coordinates: 41°53′0″S 72°35′0″W

Geography
- Location: Los Lagos Region, Chile
- Parent range: Andes

Geology
- Rock age: 2,500 years
- Mountain type: Pyroclastic cone
- Last eruption: 590 BCE

Apagado (Spanish for Extinct, also known as Hualiaque) is a pyroclastic cone with scattered vegetation cover. It has an approximately 400 m (1,312 ft)-wide crater and a base diameter of approximately 2 km (1 mi). The volcano is located in Chile's Los Lagos Region, and lies 13 km (8 mi) west of the Hornopirén Volcano and southwest of Yate Volcano on a peninsula that borders the Reloncaví Estuary, Reloncaví Sound and Gulf of Ancud. Apagado has a nearly intact summit crater.

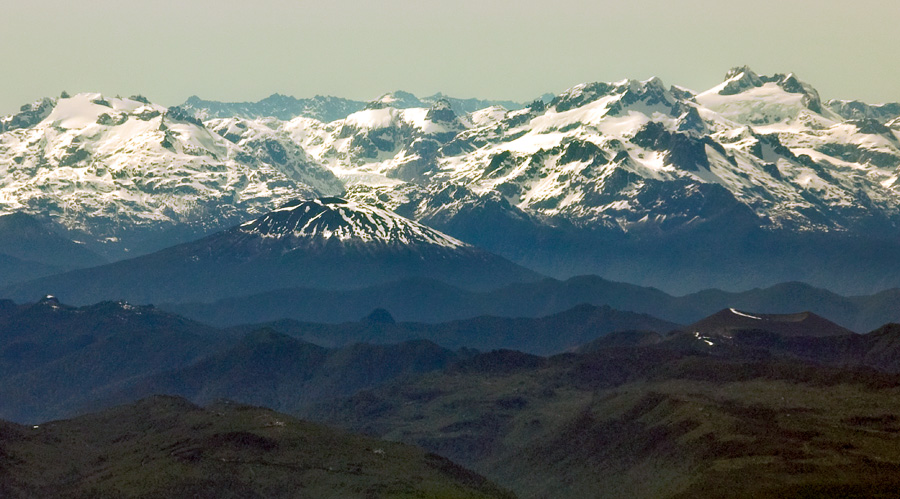
Hornopirén and Apagado. Hornopirén is the wide, cone-shaped mountain with flow patterns in the snow on its summit, while Apagado is the small, brownish cone with the wide crater on the bottom right hand side. It has a curved snow border on the left edge of its crater rim.

== See also ==
- List of volcanoes in Chile
