= Cochamó =

- Commune
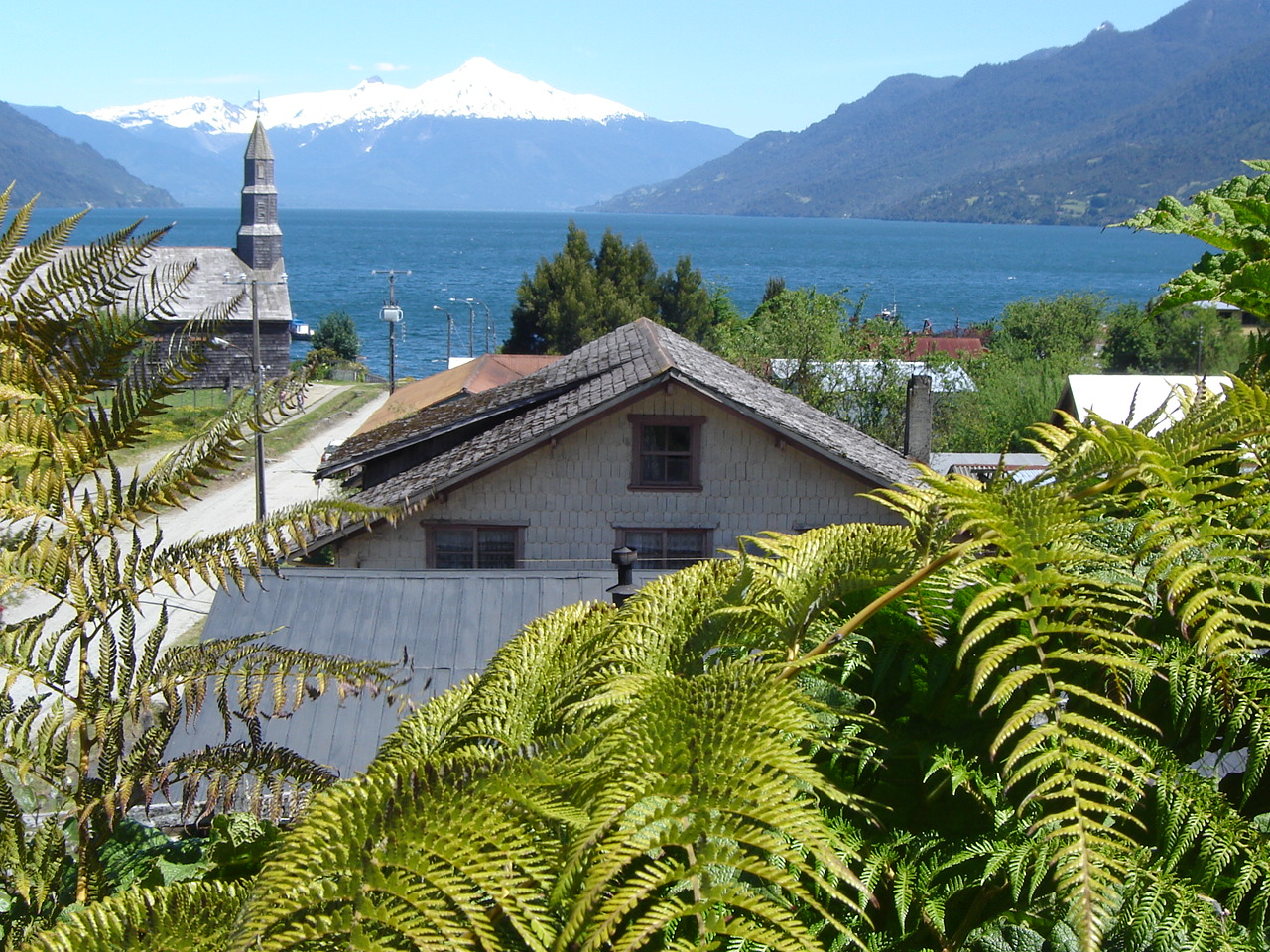
- Reloncaví Estuary with Yate volcano in the background and the town of Cochamó in the foreground.

- Location of Cochamó commune in Los Lagos Region Location in Chile
- Coordinates: 41°29′39″S 72°18′24″W
- Country: Chile
- Region: Los Lagos
- Province: Llanquihue
- Founded: 1979

Government
  - Type: Municipality
  - Alcalde: Carlos Soto Sotomayor (PRSD)

Area
  - Total: 3,910.8 km^{2} (1,510.0 sq mi)
- Elevation: 7 m (23 ft)

Population (2012 Census)
  - Total: 3,908
  - Density: 0.9993/km^{2} (2.588/sq mi)
  - Urban: 0
  - Rural: 4,363

Sex
  - Men: 2,506
  - Women: 1,857
- Time zone: UTC-4 (CLT)
  - Summer (DST): UTC-3 (CLST)
- Area code: country 56 + city 65
- Website: Municipality of Cochamó

Cochamó is a Chilean town and commune located in Llanquihue Province, Los Lagos Region. The capital of the commune is the town of Río Puelo, which is named after the Puelo River.

== Toponymy ==
Cochamó gets its name from the Mapudungun word Kocha-mo, which means “where the waters meet.” This refers to the place where the Reloncaví estuary joins the sea.

== History ==
This sprawling commune was established in 1979; its capital is the Rio Puelo community. Settlement in the area dates back to prehispanic times. Later, the town emerged from stages of consolidating permanent occupation of Cochamó. Recently, ecotourism has become a constantly growing activity in the area. The population of Cochamó is mostly of Spanish origin, with small numbers of Germans and Italians and one young Czech couple.

== Demographics ==
Historical population
Year	Pop.	±% p.a.
1952	4,236	—
1970	4,987	+0.91%
1982	4,498	−0.86%
1992	4,361	−0.31%
2002	4,363	+0.00%
2017	4,023	−0.54%
2024	4,199	+0.61%
Source: "Censo de Población y Vivienda". National Statistics Institute.

According to the 2002 census of the National Statistics Institute, Cochamó spans an area of 3,910.8 km^{2} (1,510 sq mi) and has 4,363 inhabitants (2,506 men and 1,857 women), making the commune an entirely rural area. The population grew by 0% (2 persons) between the 1992 and 2002 censuses.

== Administration ==
As a commune, Cochamó is a third-level administrative division of Chile administered by a municipal council, headed by an alcalde who is directly elected every four years. The 2008-2012 alcalde is Carlos Soto Sotomayor (PRSD).

Within the electoral divisions of Chile, Cochamó is represented in the Chamber of Deputies by Marisol Turres (UDI) and Patricio Vallespín (PDC) as part of the 57th electoral district, together with Puerto Montt, Maullín and Calbuco. The commune is represented in the Senate by Camilo Escalona Medina (PS) and Carlos Kuschel Silva (RN) as part of the 17th senatorial constituency (Los Lagos Region).

== Nearby Attractions ==
Nearby attractions include:

- Cochamó Valley
- Vicente Pérez Rosales National Park
