= Puelo =

Puelo may refer to:

- Puelo Lake, a lake in Chubut Province, Argentina
- Puelo River, a river in Los Lagos Region, Chile
