= Llanquihue National Reserve =

Nature Reserve in Chile

- IUCN category IV (habitat/species management area)
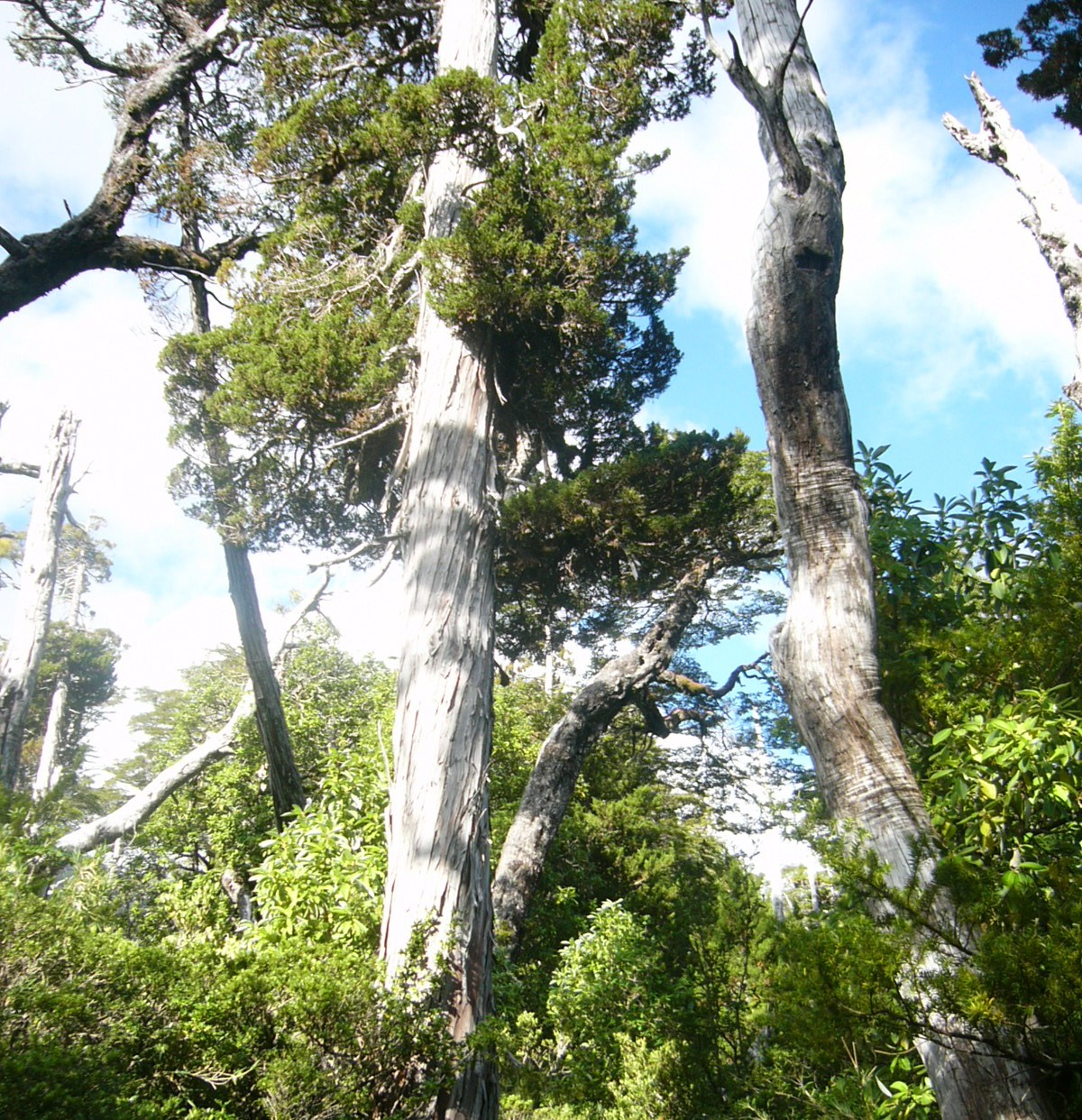
- Alerce tree in the foothills of Calbuco volcano.
- Interactive map of Llanquihue National Reserve
- Location: Los Lagos Region, Chile
- Nearest city: Puerto Montt
- Coordinates: 41°21′S 72°33′W
- Area: 339.72 km^{2}
- Designated: 1912
- Governing body: Corporación Nacional Forestal (CONAF)

Llanquihue National Reserve (Spanish: Reserva Nacional Llanquihue) is a national reserve in Los Lagos Region of Chile. The reserve lies southeast of Llanquihue Lake, and is bordered by the Petrohué River on the northeast and by the Reloncaví Estuary on the east. On the south it is bounded by Chapo Lake, which separates the reserve from Alerce Andino National Park.
