= Chapo Lake =

Lake in Los Lagos Region, Chile

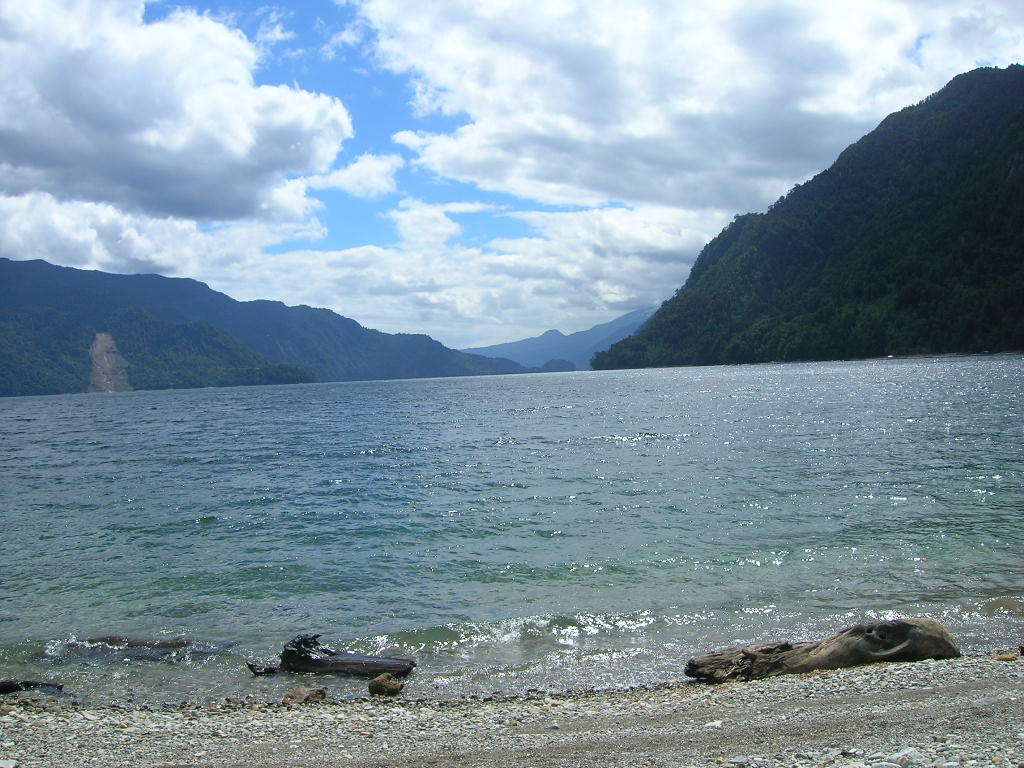

- Location within Chile
- Location: Llanquihue Province
- Coordinates: 41°27′S 72°30′W
- Catchment area: 323 km^{2} (125 sq mi)
- Basin countries: Chile
- Max. length: 17 km (11 mi)
- Max. width: 5 km (3.1 mi)
- Surface area: 45.3 km^{2} (17.5 sq mi)
- Average depth: 183.1 m (601 ft)
- Max. depth: 298 m (978 ft)
- Water volume: 8.296 km^{3} (1.990 cu mi)
- Surface elevation: 241 m (791 ft)

Chapo Lake (Spanish: Lago Chapo) is a lake of Chile located in Los Lagos Region. It lies immediately southeast of Calbuco volcano and south of Llanquihue National Reserve. Just south of the lake is Alerce Andino National Park.

Chapo Lake is a lake located in the commune of Puerto Montt, Llanquihue province, Los Lagos Region, 115 km (71 mi) southeast of Puerto Varas, 43 km (27 mi) northeast of the city of Puerto Montt and 8 km (5.0 mi) east of Correntoso. The lake is used for hydroelectric power supply.

Reloncaví Estuary receives the outflow of Chapo lake.
