= Lago Puelo, Chubut =

Lago Puelo
- Town
- Location of Lago Puelo in Argentina
- Coordinates: 42.06°S 71.60°W
- Country: Argentina
- Province: Chubut
- Department: Cushamen
- Elevation: 230 m (750 ft)

Population
  - Total: 3,129 (2,010)
- Time zone: UTC−3 (ART)
- CPA base: U9211
- Dialing code: +54 02944
- Climate: Csb

Lago Puelo is a town located in the Chubut Province, Argentina, 5 kilometers (3.1 mi) north from Puelo Lake and the Lago Puelo National Park, and 15 km (9.3 mi) south from El Bolsón. With a population of 3,129 inhabitants in 2010, it is one of the towns that forms La Comarca Andina del Paralelo 42 (Andean Region of the 42nd parallel), an organization which includes towns and rural areas in or near the Andes and clustered around the 42nd parallel of latitude in Argentina.

With a population in constant growth due to the migration from larger cities in Argentina, this small town also offers a wide variety of artisans that display their crafts in the local fair of El Bolsón, or in the annual Forest Festival (Spanish: La Fiesta Del Bosque) which is usually held during January or February.

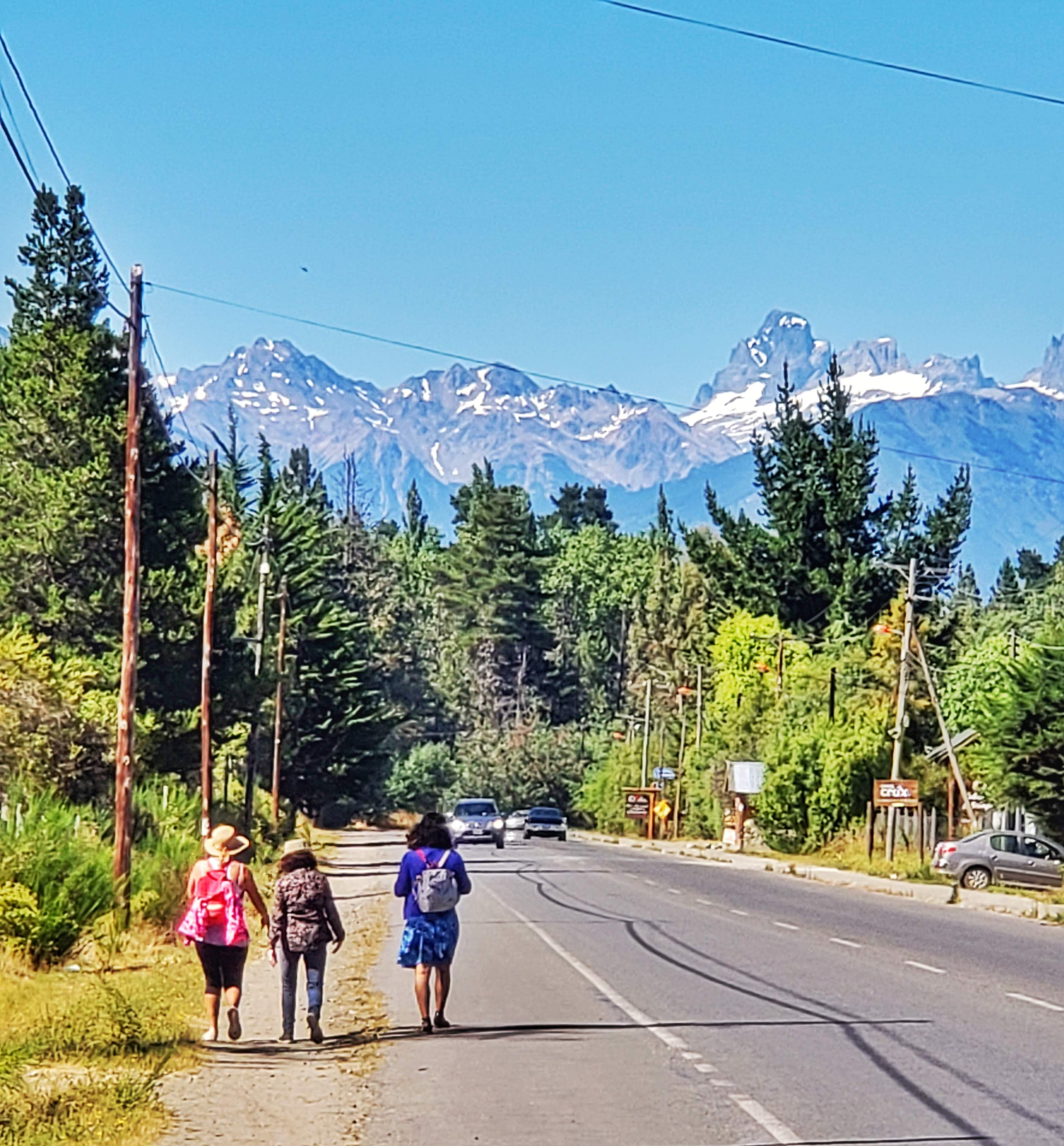
The view from a street in Lago Puelo.

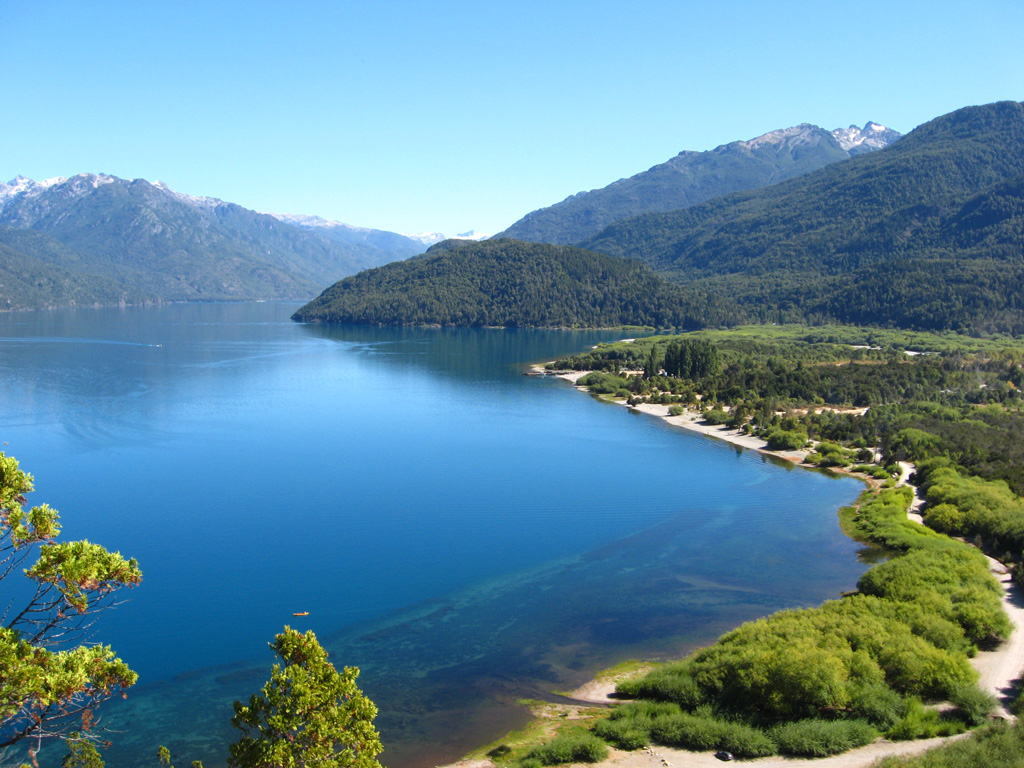
Puelo Lake near the town.

Many of the town's inhabitants are native "porteños", i.e. people from Buenos Aires.

== Climate ==
The climate of Lago Pueblo under the Köppen Classification system is a temperate oceanic climate (Cfb). Under the Trewartha climate classification system, the climate is classified as Crlk (maritime temperate, with mild summers and cool winters. Most precipitation is in the Austral winter months from May to August. Snowfall is frequent in the winter months.

Climate data for Lago Puelo, Chubut, Argentina, -42.06 -71.60. Elevation: 230 metres (750 ft).
Month	Jan	Feb	Mar	Apr	May	Jun	Jul	Aug	Sep	Oct	Nov	Dec	Year
Mean daily maximum °C (°F)	24.4 (75.9)	24.6 (76.3)	21.5 (70.7)	16.7 (62.1)	12.6 (54.7)	9.3 (48.7)	8.8 (47.8)	10.5 (50.9)	13.4 (56.1)	17.7 (63.9)	21.1 (70.0)	23.3 (73.9)	17.0 (62.6)
Daily mean °C (°F)	16.8 (62.2)	16.2 (61.2)	13.8 (56.8)	10.2 (50.4)	7.6 (45.7)	5.2 (41.4)	4.5 (40.1)	5.6 (42.1)	8.0 (46.4)	10.7 (51.3)	13.5 (56.3)	15.6 (60.1)	10.6 (51.1)
Mean daily minimum °C (°F)	9.2 (48.6)	7.8 (46.0)	6.1 (43.0)	3.8 (38.8)	2.6 (36.7)	1.1 (34.0)	0.3 (32.5)	0.7 (33.3)	2.6 (36.7)	3.8 (38.8)	6.0 (42.8)	8.0 (46.4)	4.3 (39.7)
Average precipitation mm (inches)	32 (1.3)	46 (1.8)	69 (2.7)	87 (3.4)	186 (7.3)	200 (7.9)	171 (6.7)	127 (5.0)	89 (3.5)	58 (2.3)	53 (2.1)	44 (1.7)	1,162 (45.7)

== Sources ==
- Villa Lago Puelo - Patagonia Lands (in Spanish)
- Comarca Andina - Lago Puelo (in Spanish)
- Lago Puelo - Hoteles Argentina
