= Calbuco (volcano) =

Mountain in Chile

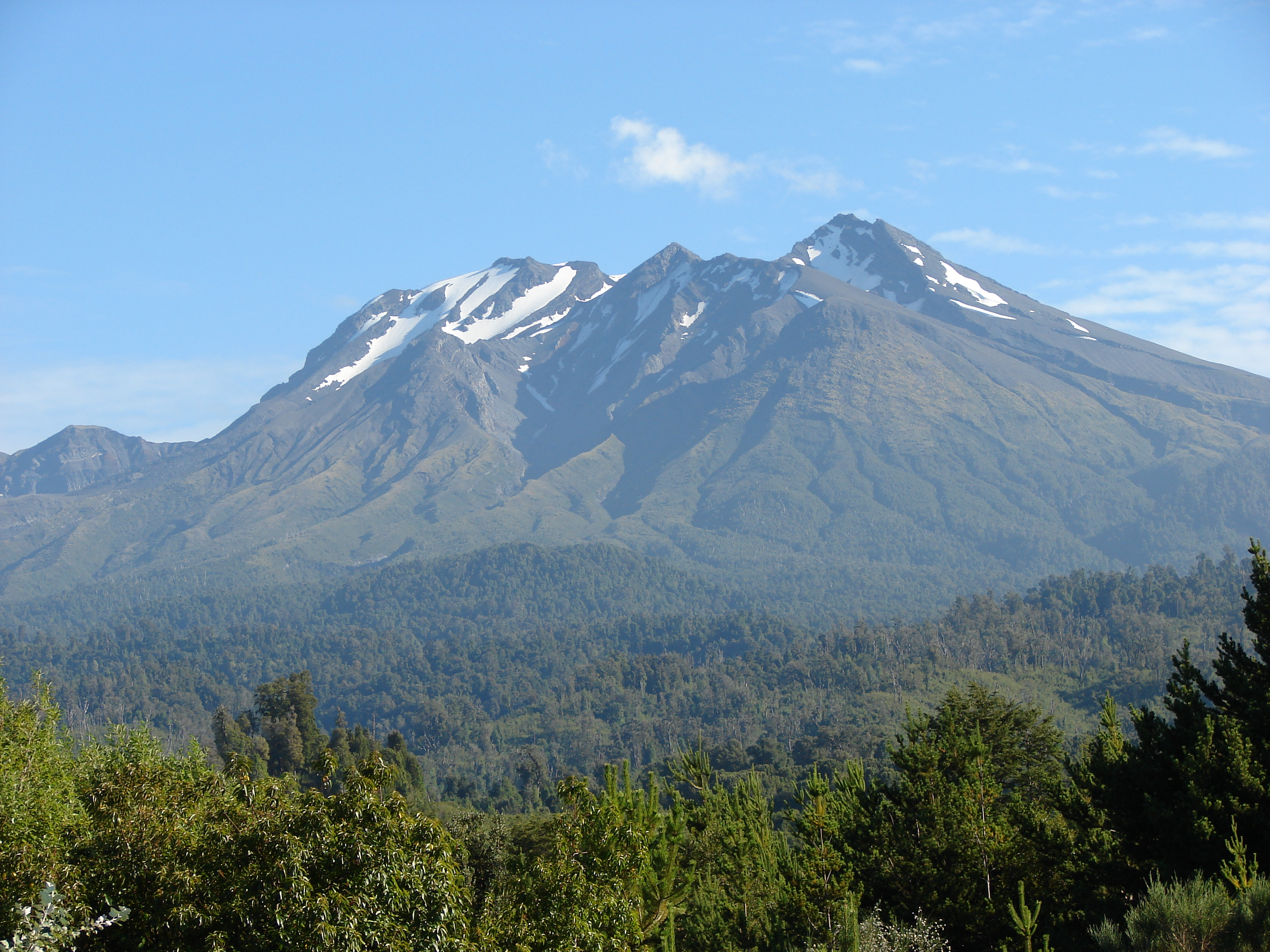
- Calbuco, in 2010, viewed from the north

Highest point
- Elevation: 2,015 m (6,611 ft)
- Prominence: 1,946 m (6,385 ft)
- Listing: Ultra
- Coordinates: 41°19′48″S 72°37′06″W

Geography
- Location within Chile
- Location: Los Lagos, Chile
- Parent range: Andes

Geology
- Rock age: Pleistocene
- Mountain type: Stratovolcano
- Volcanic zone: South Volcanic Zone
- Last eruption: April 2015

Calbuco (/kɑːlˈbuːkoʊ/ kahl-BOO-koh; Spanish: Volcán Calbuco, pronounced [bolˈkaŋ kalˈβuko]) is a stratovolcano in southern Chile, located southeast of Llanquihue Lake and northwest of Chapo Lake, in the Los Lagos Region, and close to the cities of Puerto Varas and Puerto Montt. With an elevation of 2,015 meters above sea level, the volcano and the surrounding area are protected within the Llanquihue National Reserve.

The most recent eruption, a major VEI 4 event, happened with little warning on April 22–23, 2015, followed by a smaller eruption on April 30. This was Calbuco's first activity since 1972.

== Name and location ==
Calbuco is located partly in Puerto Varas Commune and partly in Puerto Montt Commune. It lies 49 km from the city of Puerto Varas and 69 km from Puerto Montt. Its name is thought to come from the Mapuche words "kallfü" (blue) and "ko" (water), meaning "blue water". It shares the name with Calbuco Island in nearby Reloncaví Sound as well as the city and commune of Calbuco, although it is not located there.

== Geology ==
Calbuco is a very explosive andesite volcano whose lavas usually contain 55 to 60% silicon dioxide (SiO_{2}). It is elongated in a SW-NE direction and is capped by a 400-500 meter wide summit crater. Its complex evolution included the collapse of an intermediate edifice during the late Pleistocene that produced a debris avalanche that reached Llanquihue Lake.

=== Volcanic activity ===
Calbuco has had 36 confirmed eruptions during the Holocene, 13 of which have been recorded in historical times. 20th century eruptions took place in 1906, 1907, 1909, 1911, 1917, 1929, 1932, 1945, 1961, and 1972. A series of three eruptions occurred from April 22–30, 2015.

The 1893–95 Calbuco eruption was one of the largest ever to take place in southern Chile, with debris ejected to distances of eight kilometres, accompanied by voluminous hot lahars. The 1893 eruption disrupted the daily life of German settlers in eastern Llanquihue Lake. In this area potato fields, cattle and apiculture were negatively impacted. Cattle were evacuated from the area and settlers lobbied the government of Jorge Montt to be relocated elsewhere.

Calbuco erupting on April 30, 2015

In the strong explosions of April 1917, a lava dome formed in the crater accompanied by hot lahars. Another short explosive eruption in January 1929 also included an apparent pyroclastic flow and a lava flow.

The major eruption of 1961 sent ash columns 12–15 km high, produced plumes that dispersed mainly to the south east and emitted two lava flows. There was a minor, four-hour eruption on August 26, 1972. Strong fumarolic emission from the main crater was observed on August 12, 1996.

The most recent eruption happened in April 2015, when on April 22, the volcano suddenly erupted with little warning, sending a large ash column into the atmosphere; another eruption occurred in the early hours of April 23. A smaller eruption occurred on April 30. The eruptions ranked as a 4 on the Volcanic Explosivity Index. The volcano returned to the lowest alert level on August 18, 2015. The ash of the eruption dispersed nutrients into the sea which may have contributed to unleashing the algal bloom of 2016.

== See also ==
- List of volcanoes in Chile
- List of Ultras of South America

== Gallery ==

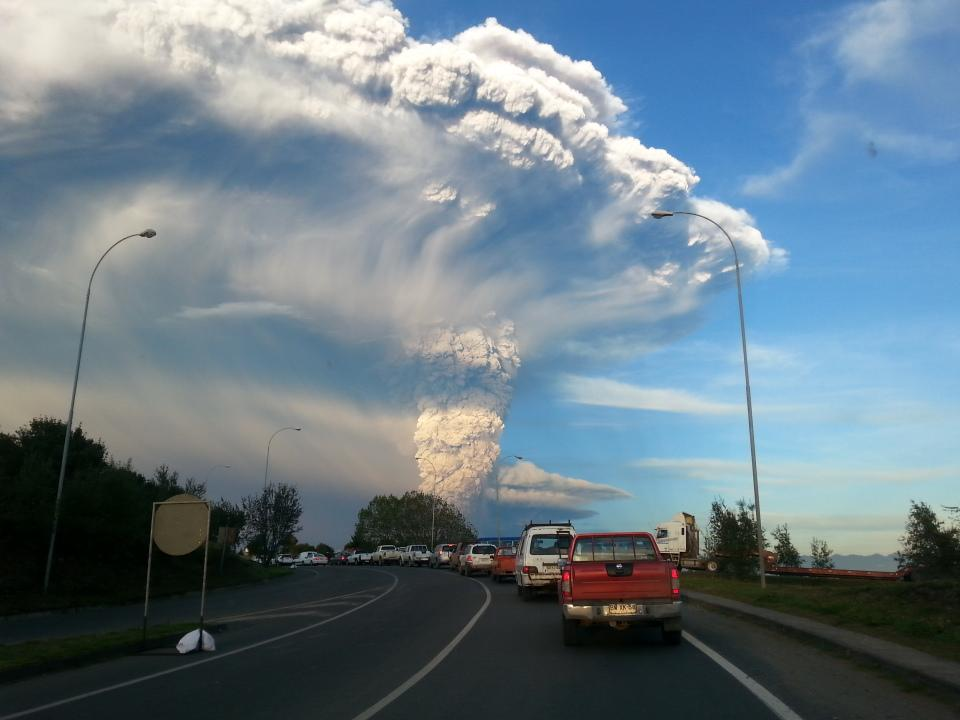
View of the eruption column of Calbuco Volcano from Puerto Varas, Chile, on April 22, 2015.

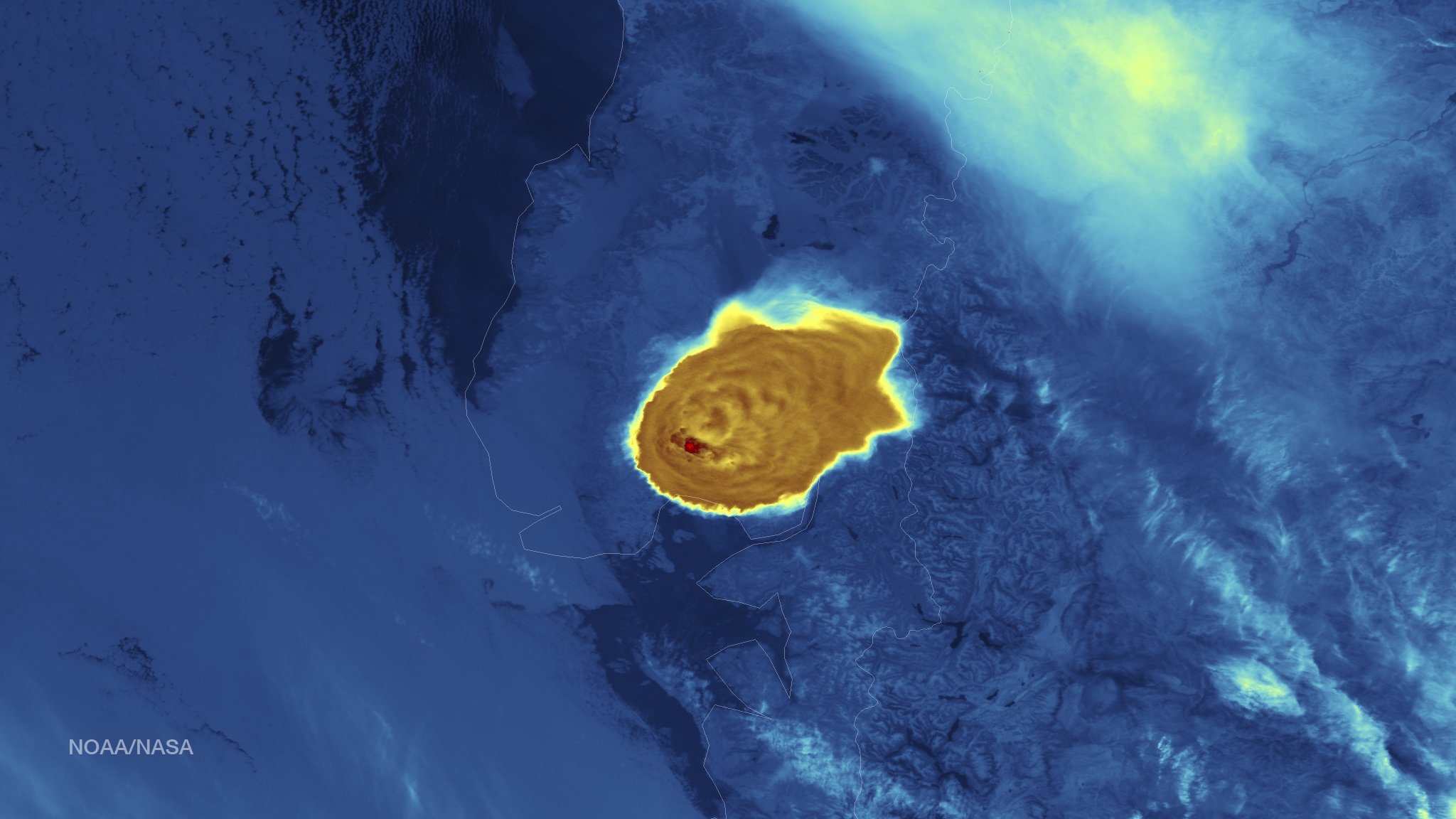
Picture taken with VIIRS, infrared, April 23, 2015.

The ISS passes over a plume of ash and SO_{2} from the eruption.

== Sources ==
- González-Ferrán, Oscar (1995). Volcanes de Chile (in Spanish). Santiago, Chile: Instituto Geográfico Militar. p. 640 pp. ISBN 956-202-054-1.
- Biggar, John (2005). The Andes: A Guide for Climbers (3rd ed.). Andes Publishing (Scotland). p. 304 pp. ISBN 0-9536087-2-7.
