= Caicura Islets =

Group of islands off the coast of Chile

Coordinates: 41°43′36.11″S 72°41′6.11″W

The Caicura Islets (Spanish: Islas Caicura, Islotes Caicura) are a group of small islands located off the Pacific coast of northern Patagonia in Chile. More specifically they lie where the fjord Reloncaví Estuary meet Reloncaví Sound. It is an important breeding site for marine birds and South American sea lions. Prior to the settlement of the islands in the late 20th century there was also a Magellanic penguin colony on them. Southern elephant seals have occasionally been observed at the islets.
