= Cochamó Valley =

Valley in the Andes in Chile

- Cerro Trinidad
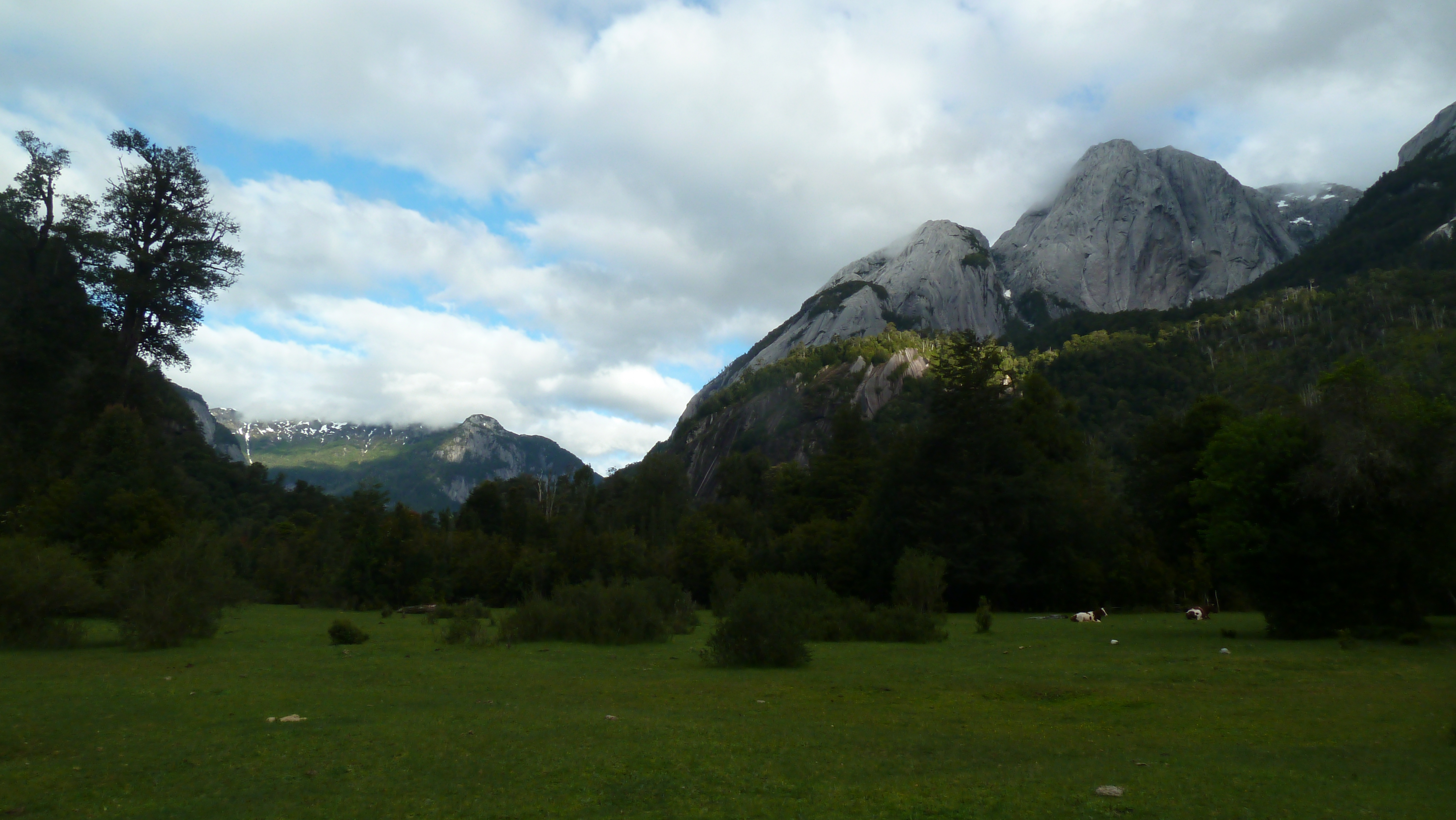
- Area: 250,000 acres (1,000 km^{2})

Geography
- Location: Chile
- Population centers: Cochamó
- Coordinates: 41°25′12″S 72°08′05″W
- Interactive map of Cochamó Valley

Cochamó Valley (Spanish pronunciation: [kotʃamo] is a U-shaped valley located in the Andes, in Los Lagos Region of Chile, south of Vicente Pérez Rosales National Park and east of the Reloncaví Estuary. The valley takes its name from the river of Cochamó, and has a striking similarity to Yosemite Valley, due to its granite domes and old-growth forests.

Like Yosemite, hikers and rock climbers from around the world come for the valley's several 1,000 meters (3,300 ft) granite walls. A developing eco-tourism location for serious hikers with trails ranging from easy to challenging, and a myriad of rare bird and plant life, and a stunning landscape. Five kilometers from the village of Cochamó is a 6km gravel road that terminates at the hiking trail that leads into this east-west running valley.

The trail carries on up through Argentina, traverses some of the most unspoiled areas of northern Patagonia, and rewards travelers with views of granite walls, plunging waterfalls, soaring condors, towering Alerce trees, and the magical deep-blue Vidal Gormaz Lake, known for trout fishing. The trail is more than 100 years old, and was used to transport Argentinean beef cattle from across the border to be shipped from Cochamó to the hungry nitrate miners in far northern Chile. In turn, dried and smoked fish and shellfish made the return journey into the mountains and across Paso El León into Argentina. The trail's most famous users were Butch Cassidy and the Sundance Kid, who, while hiding out for a couple of years at their ranch in Argentina, actually drove their own cattle down to sell in Cochamó.

== Flora and fauna ==
The valley is home to dense, virgin temperate rainforest - one of only three such remaining forests in the world. It is not unusual to find trees close to 1,000 years old, and climbers, vines, and undergrowth that have not known human footsteps. Wild boar (an invasive species), pudú, and the occasional puma inhabit the upper slopes - but are rarely seen and rarely a threat to man.

== Land owners ==
Almost the entire valley is privately owned—mostly in the hand of local residents. Land has been passed down over the course of 3 generations, since homesteaders staked claims in the first quarter of the 20th century. The land is used primarily for free-ranging cattle, with the majority of owners living in Cochamó, and making occasional trips to check on their animals and bring them down for sale when needed. There is minimal raising of crops.

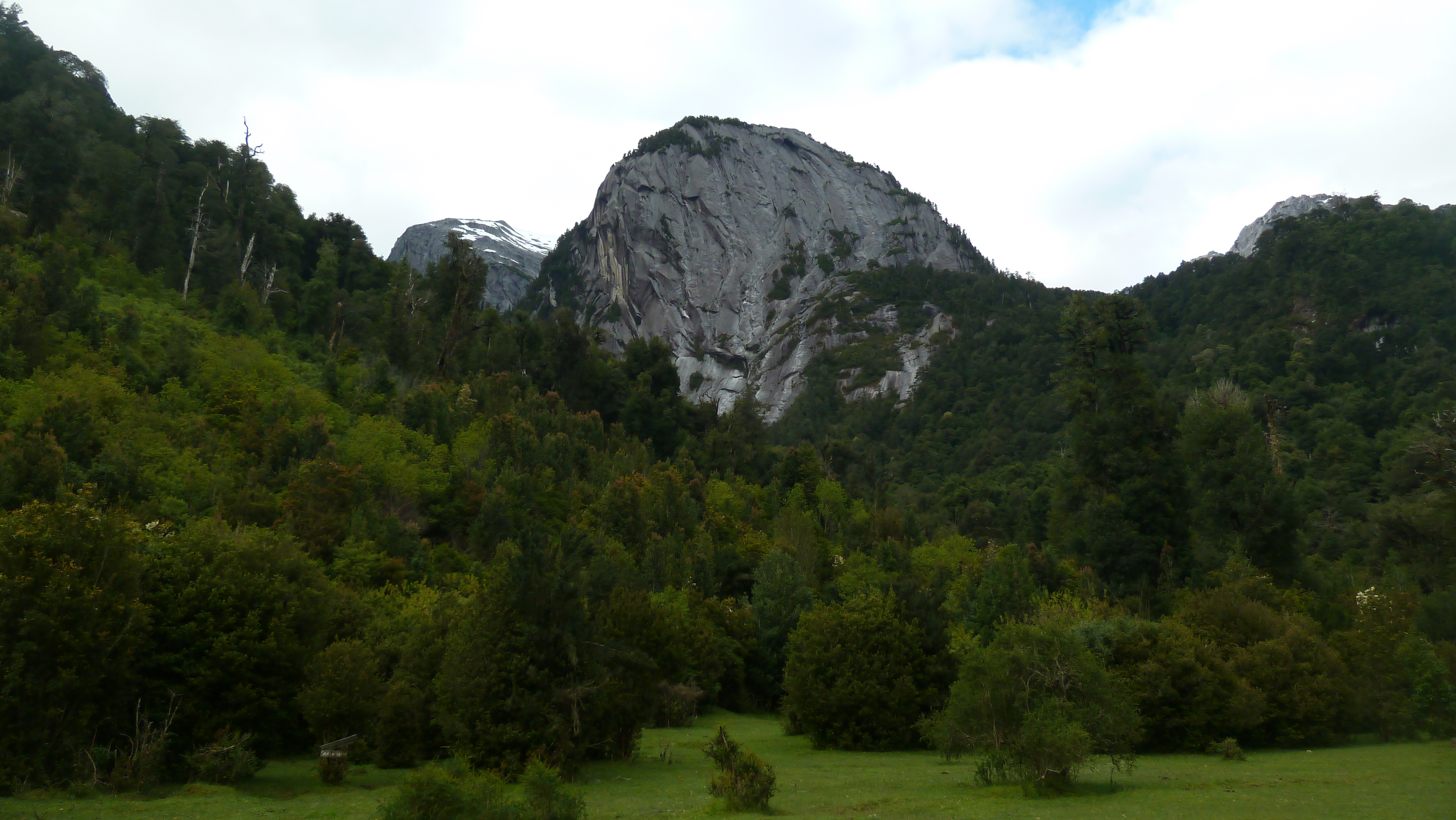
Cerro La Junta

== Ecotourism ==
The main activity in the valley today - aside from cattle rearing and local logging for firewood - is ecotourism. International tourism was pioneered by in the early 1990s by German adventurer and maverick, Clark Stede, who brought the trail to the attention of mainly European visitors, and established two lodges - one at the mouth of the River Cochamó, and an "outback" lodge in the upper La Junta Valley (the 'Yosemite' of Chile). These evolved into Campo Aventura. Since the initial development, the valley has slowly gained more recognition, attracting two types of travelers: rock climbers focused on pushing their limits in scaling the granite walls and towers; and visitors who are keen to explore this natural magnificence on horseback or via hiking, and travel with established operators or with local residents.

== Threats to sustainability ==
The valley, as with other river catchments in Chile, is often under threat from large-scale, external economic interests. A few years ago, residents banded together to successfully prevent large-scale logging exploitation, including the building of a road accessible by vehicles through the entire valley. (But not before the first 7 km of gravel track was laid down - which, today, is of benefit to local residents). More recently, the valley has come under threat from hydro-electric companies - that, in 2009, floated plans to create a system of large-scale pipes and tubes, and pylons, to produce vast amounts of electricity. Again, locals have banded together to combat this effort, and preserve the valley. In late 2009, the Cochamó River was designated as a river protected for tourism, but this government designation is likely to be challenged in court or parliament by the business community.

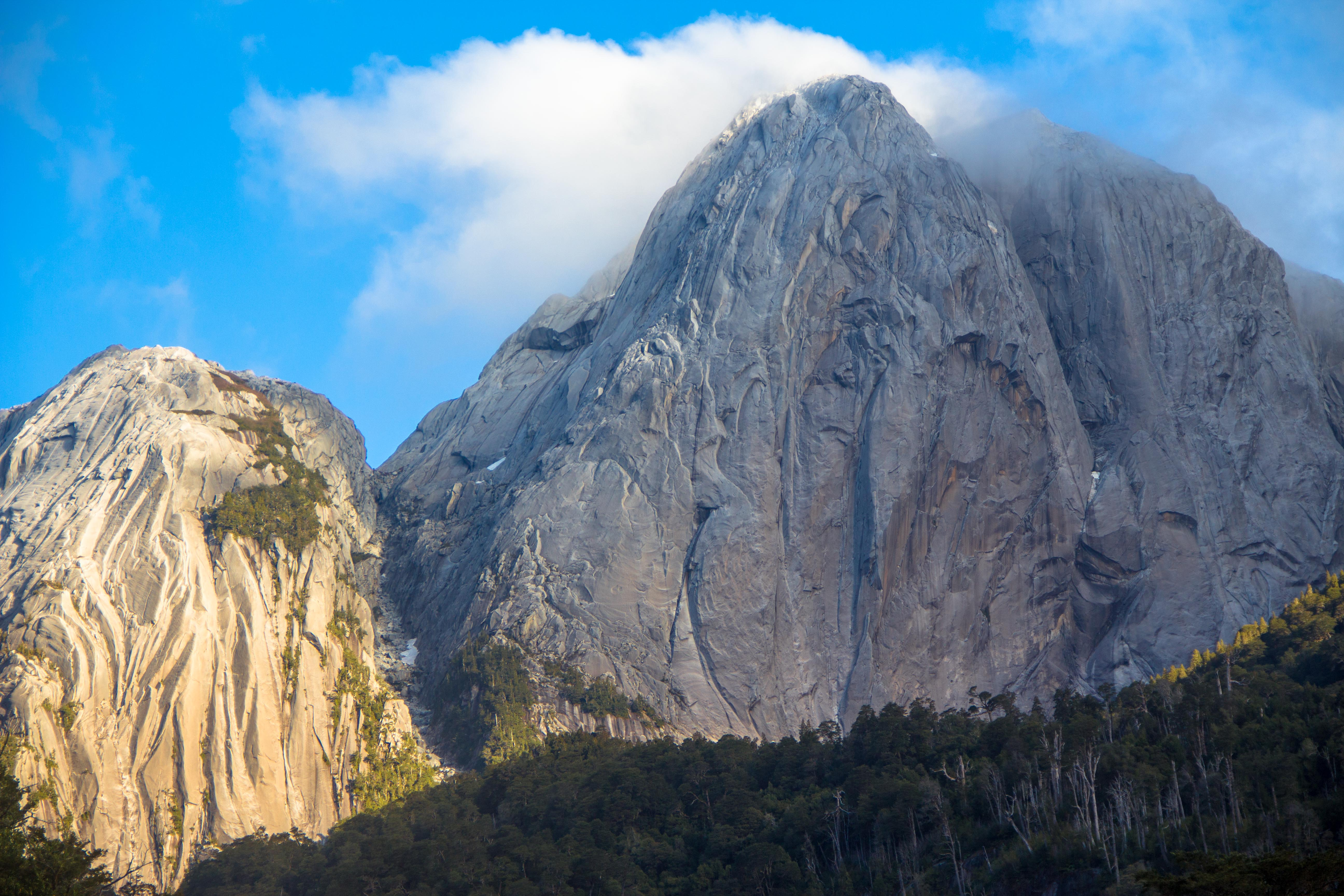
Cerro Trinidad
