= Maullín =

- Town and Commune
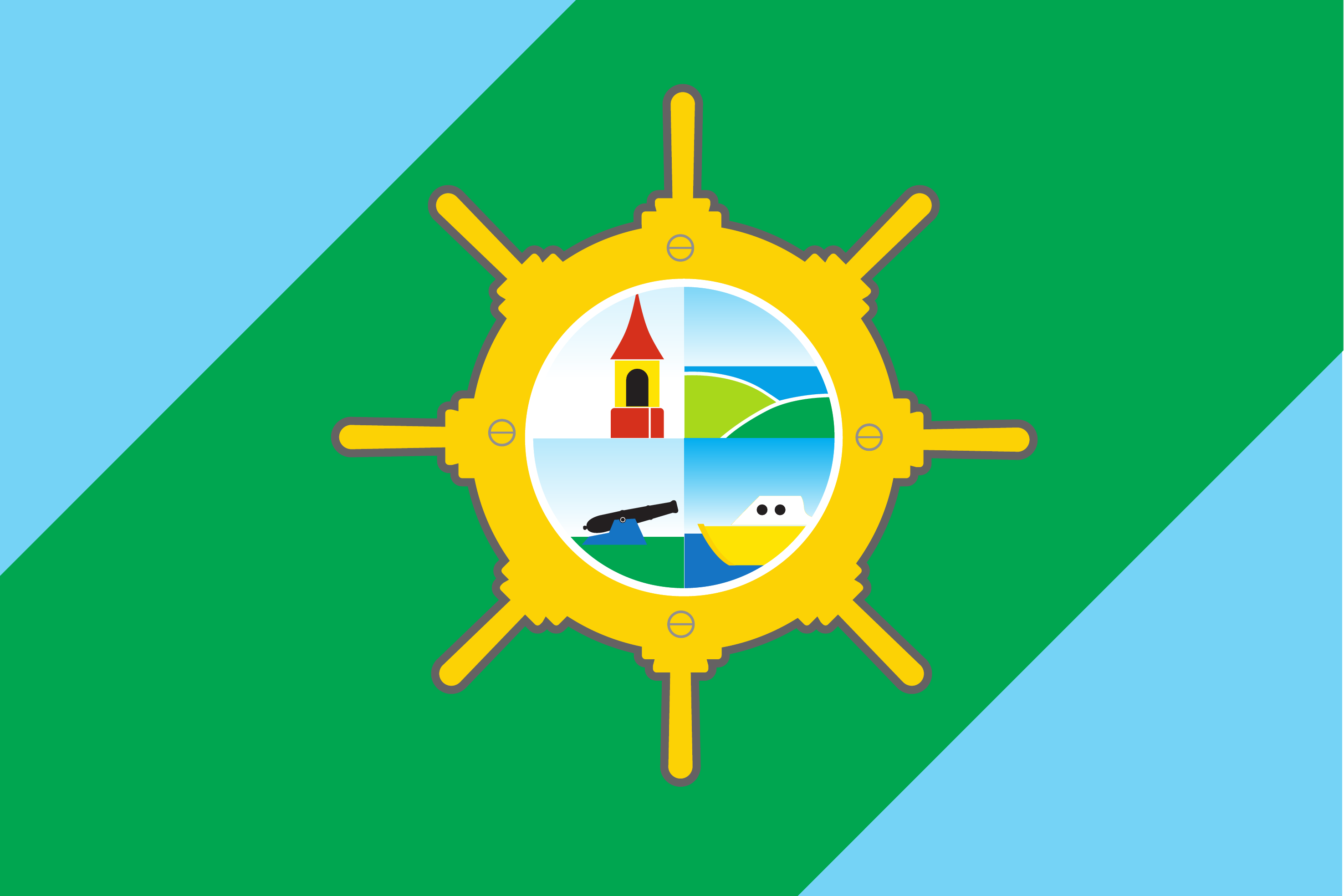
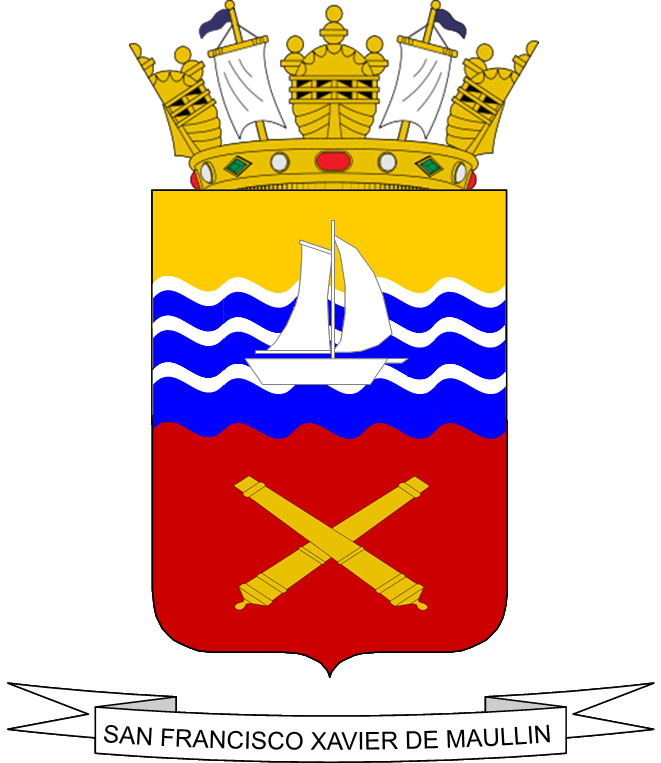
- Flag Coat of arms Location of Maullín commune in Los Lagos Region Location in Chile
- Coordinates (town): 41°37′S 73°36′W
- Country: Chile
- Region: Los Lagos
- Province: Llanquihue

Government
  - Type: Municipality
  - Alcalde: Jorge Westermeier Estrada (DC)

Area
  - Total: 860.8 km^{2} (332.4 sq mi)
- Elevation: 17 m (56 ft)

Population (2002)
  - Total: 15,580
  - Density: 18.10/km^{2} (46.88/sq mi)
  - Urban: 6,896
  - Rural: 8,684

Sex
  - Men: 8,146
  - Women: 7,434
- Time zone: UTC-4 (CLT)
  - Summer (DST): UTC-3 (CLST)
- Area code: 56 + 65
- Website: www.municipalidadmaullin.cl

Maullín is Chilean town and commune in Llanquihue Province which is part of Los Lagos Region. The commune is located in at the outflow of Maullín River.

== History ==
In 1674, there was a group of Basque soldiers in the present location of the commune, which allowed early detection of movements of the attacks of internal and external enemies (mostly Dutchmen and Englishmen who entered through the Cape Horn). In 1787, the fort was rebuilt by Colonel Francisco Hurtado.

Following the Independence of Chile, the city developed slowly until September 15, 1882, when Supreme Decree granted the rank of municipality.

The fate of Maullín and dynamic economic would be arrested by increasing industrialization and the opening of the Panama Canal.

Into the early twentieth century, large ships arrived bringing manufactured goods from Europe. Until 1946, wood was exploited in large numbers, with numerous sawmills and docks on the river for shipping large cargo timber and by embancamiento sands at the mouth of rivers.

== Demographics ==
Historical population
Year	Pop.	±% p.a.
1875	6,422	—
1885	7,762	+1.91%
1895	8,039	+0.35%
1907	10,078	+1.90%
1920	11,183	+0.80%
1930	15,847	+3.55%
1940	17,997	+1.28%
1952	20,758	+1.20%
1970	11,947	−3.02%
1982	13,301	+0.90%
1992	17,115	+2.55%
2002	15,580	−0.94%
2017	14,216	−0.61%
2024	15,063	+0.83%
Source: "Censo de Población y Vivienda". National Statistics Institute.

According to the 2002 census of the National Statistics Institute, Maullín spans an area of 860.8 km^{2} (332 sq mi) and has 15,580 inhabitants (8,146 men and 7,434 women). Of these, 6,896 (44.3%) lived in urban areas and 8,684 (55.7%) in rural areas. The population fell by 9% (1535 persons) between the 1992 and 2002 censuses.

== Administration ==
As a commune, Maullín is a third-level administrative division of Chile administered by a municipal council, headed by an alcalde who is directly elected every four years. The 2008-2012 alcalde is Juan Cárcamo Cárcamo (PDC).

Within the electoral divisions of Chile, Maullín is represented in the Chamber of Deputies by Marisol Turres (UDI) and Patricio Vallespín (PDC) as part of the 57th electoral district, together with Puerto Montt, Cochamó and Calbuco. The commune is represented in the Senate by Camilo Escalona Medina (PS) and Carlos Kuschel Silva (RN) as part of the 17th senatorial constituency (Los Lagos Region).

== Tourism ==
During the summer, Maullín, brings retro artists (hence the name Retro Maullín Festival), which is also unique in Chile. A 4 km from city, is the "Pangal Beach", known locally for its beauty, peace and serenity. During the months of February, in Pangal beach, people all over the south of Chile are attending the "Festival Traditionalist", famous for its typical gastronomy, beliefs, dances and songs.

== Climate ==
Climate data for Maullín
Month	Jan	Feb	Mar	Apr	May	Jun	Jul	Aug	Sep	Oct	Nov	Dec	Year
Mean daily maximum °C (°F)	19.9 (67.8)	19.8 (67.6)	18.3 (64.9)	15.6 (60.1)	13.2 (55.8)	11.3 (52.3)	10.9 (51.6)	11.4 (52.5)	13.0 (55.4)	14.8 (58.6)	16.2 (61.2)	17.9 (64.2)	15.2 (59.3)
Daily mean °C (°F)	13.6 (56.5)	13.1 (55.6)	11.5 (52.7)	9.8 (49.6)	8.1 (46.6)	7.1 (44.8)	6.6 (43.9)	6.8 (44.2)	7.6 (45.7)	9.2 (48.6)	10.8 (51.4)	12.4 (54.3)	9.7 (49.5)
Mean daily minimum °C (°F)	9.3 (48.7)	8.7 (47.7)	7.2 (45.0)	5.9 (42.6)	4.8 (40.6)	4.0 (39.2)	3.4 (38.1)	3.4 (38.1)	4.1 (39.4)	5.5 (41.9)	6.9 (44.4)	8.3 (46.9)	6.0 (42.7)
Average precipitation mm (inches)	81.6 (3.21)	93.1 (3.67)	129.0 (5.08)	161.8 (6.37)	239.4 (9.43)	277.3 (10.92)	237.6 (9.35)	211.0 (8.31)	162.6 (6.40)	106.0 (4.17)	103.3 (4.07)	112.4 (4.43)	1,915.1 (75.41)
Source: Bioclimatografia de Chile
