= Hornopirén National Park =

National Park of Chile

- IUCN category II (national park)
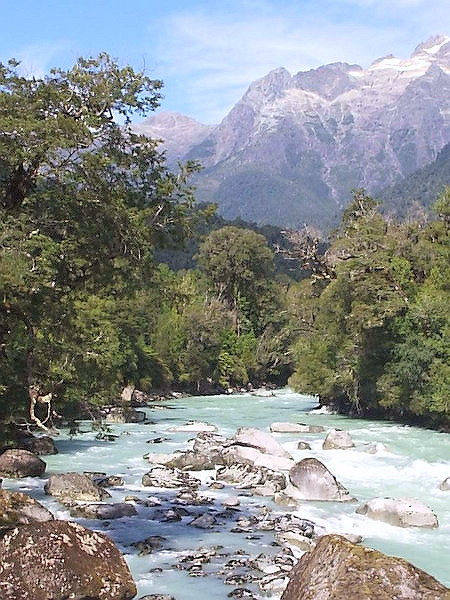
- Blanco River, Hornopirén

- Location within Chile
- Location: Los Lagos Region, Chile
- Nearest city: Hornopirén
- Coordinates: 41°55′00″S 72°16′00″W
- Area: 482 km^{2} (186 sq mi)
- Established: 1988
- Governing body: Corporación Nacional Forestal

Hornopirén National Park (Spanish pronunciation: [oɾnoˈpiɾen]) is located in the Andes, in the Palena Province of Chile's Los Lagos Region, also known as Region X. The park contains 482 km^{2} (186 sq mi) of rugged mountains and unspoiled Valdivian temperate rain forests. This national park borders the northern portion of Pumalín Park. The Carretera Austral passes close to the park. In the vicinity of the park lie Hornopirén and Yate volcanoes.

== Geography ==
The park is part of the Andes mountain chain. There are 22 hectares of mountains, glaciers and volcanoes. The park is dominated by glacier-carved mountains and active volcanoes. It includes glaciers comprising an area of 30 km^{2} (12 sq mi). The Yate volcano stands 2,187 meters above sea level and the Hornopirén volcano stands 1,572 meters above sea level. From the Yate volcano southern slope, at only 1,500 meters, you can enjoy panoramic views of the mountains and forests of the park, including a full view of the lake and even Pinto Concha Hornopirén fjord.

== Water ==
The three main bodies of water in the park are Pinto Concha Lake 4.75 km^{2} (2 sq mi), Cabrera Lake 1.55 km^{2} (1 sq mi) and Inexplorado Lake 1.5 km^{2} (1 sq mi). Pinto Concha is the most visited attraction in the park. There are six main rivers in the park. Inexplorado Lake is one of a series of paternoster lakes that form part of the Blanco River drainage basin. The aforesaid lakes are characterized by distinctive blue and green hues, due to rock flour suspended in their waters and give to the river its milky appearance. Negro River is another major river system in the park.

== Forests ==
They are surrounded totally or partially by millennial alerce also known as larch forests. The Alerce tree is the second oldest tree species on the planet. It includes Fitzroya trees almost in pure stands. The pristine alerce forests cover an area of about 97.41 km^{2} (38 sq mi), which comprises approximately the 35 percent of the vegetation cover of the park.

== Biology ==
The park has about 25 mammal species, including native as well as exotic species. Among them are the cougar, kodkod, lesser grison, chilla fox, American mink, coypu, pudú and Chilean huemul. The park is home to 18 threatened species.

== Administration ==
The park is administered by CONAF in the city of Hornopirén at the central square and all trips to the forest begin here. Entrance to the park is free. One part of the part can be visited by motor vehicle but the other part must be travelled by foot. To get to the park from Hornopirén travel 11 km north on Av. Lib. Bernardo O’Higgins. Then there is another 7 km on a bumpy gravel road through private land in order to reach the park entrance. 107 km separate Puerto Montt from this park. There are two bus companies that run between Puerto Montt and Hornopirén National Park. The trip takes about 5 hours. There is a shelter in the park for the exclusive use of the CONAF ranger. It is on the southwest side of Pinto Concha lake and provides information to tourists in the summer months. There is a designated camping area, but it provides no services, i.e., there is no barbecue nor drinking water available. Campfires in and around the park are illegal.

== Trails ==
There are two official, maintained trails in the park.

== Weather ==
Average annual rainfall is 2,500 mm and can exceed 4,000 mm. The temperature fluctuates between 9 and 12 degrees C. There are between 50 and 150 frost days a year. The park is closed to the public between July and November because snow and ice over a meter thick accumulates in the recreation area.

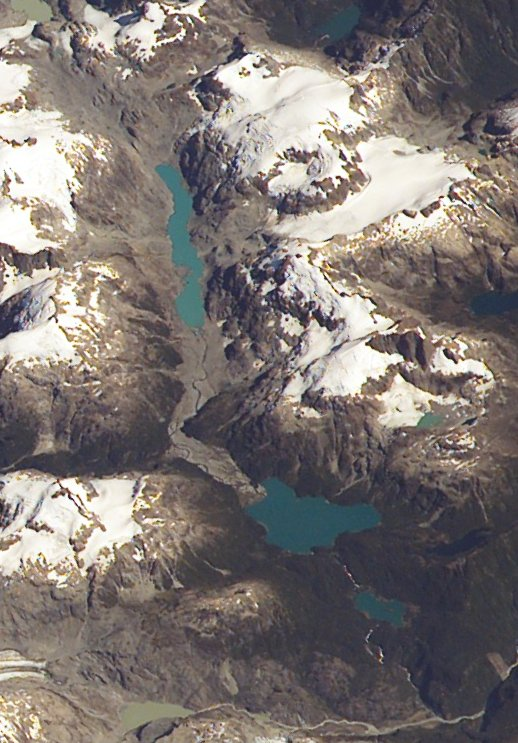
Unexplored Lake is the largest lake visible in lower half of the image.

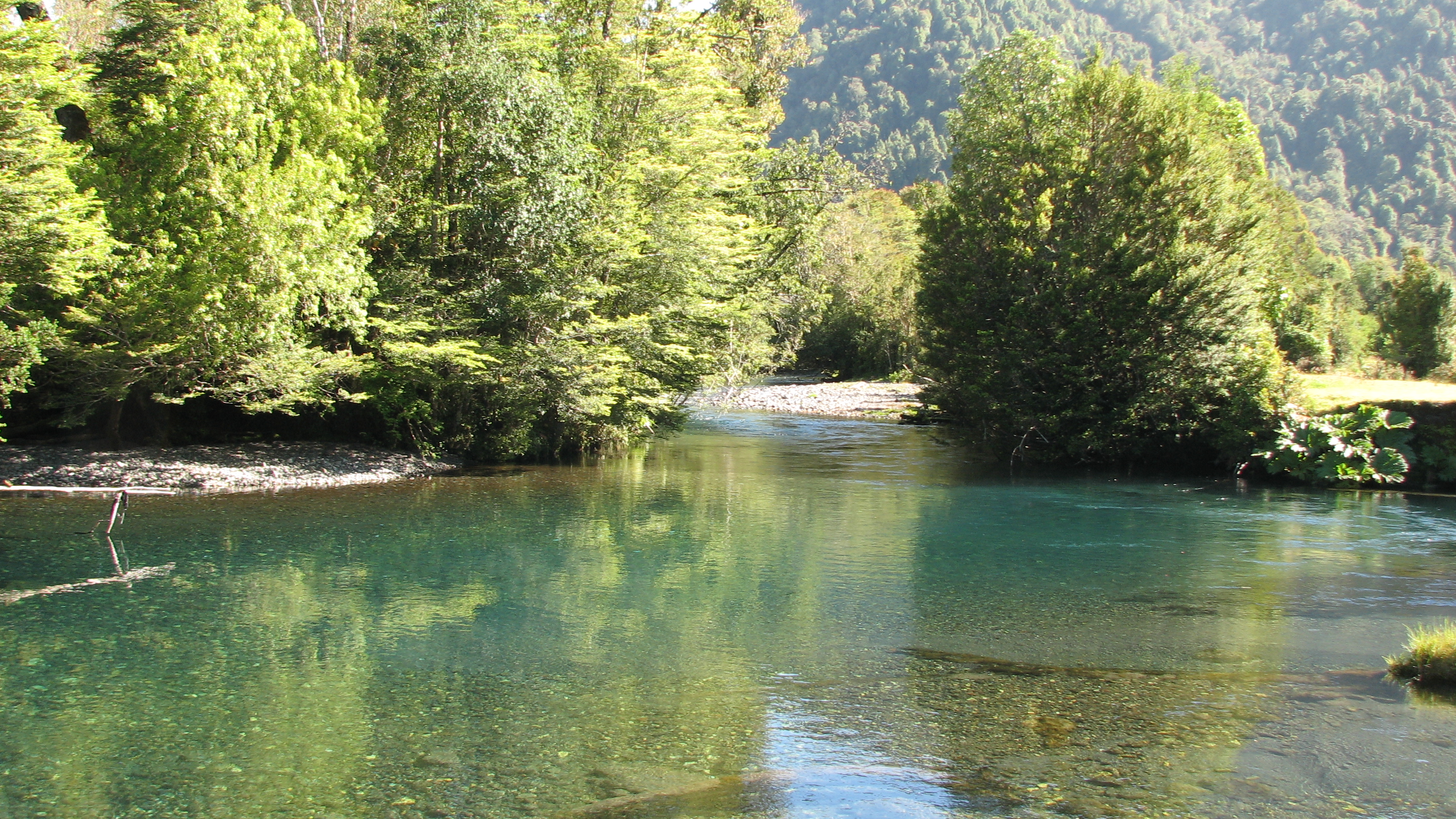
Hornopirén
