= Hornopirén (volcano) =

Mountain in Chile

- Hornopirén town and volcano.

Highest point
- Elevation: 1,572 m (5,157 ft)
- Coordinates: 41°52′28″S 72°25′53″W

Geography
- Location within Chile
- Location: Chile
- Parent range: Andes

Geology
- Mountain type: Stratovolcano
- Volcanic zone: South Volcanic Zone
- Last eruption: 1835 (?)

Hornopirén (Spanish pronunciation: [oɾnoˈpiɾen]) is a stratovolcano located in the Andes, in Los Lagos Region of Chile, south of Yate Volcano and east of Apagado or Hualiaque pyroclastic cone. Hornopirén lies on the major regional Liquine-Ofqui Fault. The volcano is said to have erupted in 1835, although no details are known. The name of the volcano derives from the Spanish word for oven, horno and the native Mapudungun word for snow pirén, thus Hornopirén means snow oven.

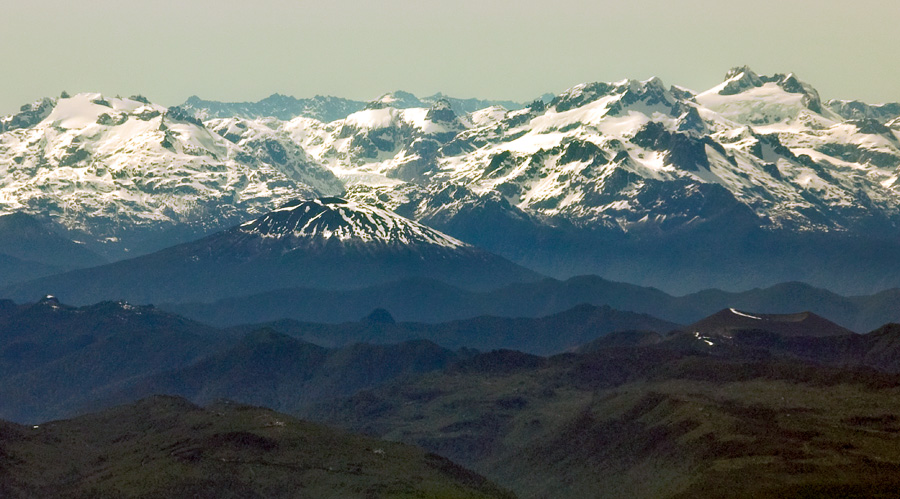
Hornopirén and Apagado. Hornopirén is the wide, cone-shaped mountain with flow patterns in the snow on its summit, while Apagado is the small, brownish cone with the wide crater on the bottom right hand side. It has a curved snow border on the left edge of its crater rim.

The town of Hornopirén is 10 kilometres (6.2 mi) south of the volcano, on an inlet off the Gulf of Ancud.

== See also ==
- List of volcanoes in Chile
- Hornopirén National Park
