= Puelo River =

River in Chile and Argentina

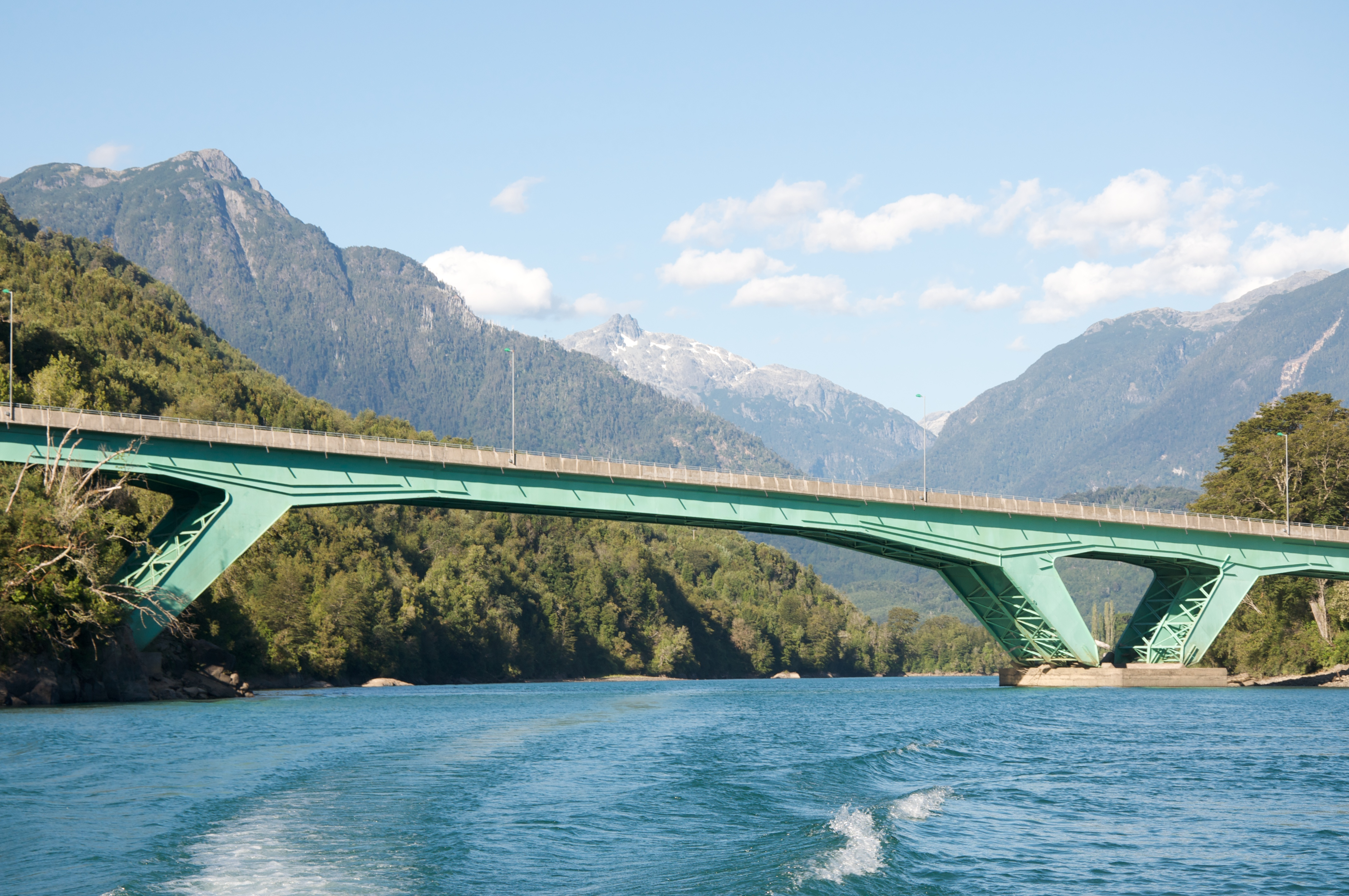
- Bridge on the Carretera Austral

- Location of mouth
- Native name: Río Puelo (Spanish)

Location
- Countries: Chile; Argentina

Physical characteristics
- Source
  - location: Puelo Lake
- Mouth
  - location: Reloncaví Estuary (Pacific Ocean)
  - coordinates: 42.116667°S 71.716667°W
- Discharge
  - average: 670 m^{3}/s (24,000 cu ft/s)

The Puelo River has its origin in Lake Puelo in Argentina, and flows north-west through the Andes into Chile and the Reloncaví Estuary of the Reloncaví Sound at the northern end of the Gulf of Ancud.

== Course ==
Just 800 metres (2,600 ft) downstream from its source in Puelo Lake, the river enters Inferior Lake. After leaving the lake, the river flows in a generally northwesterly direction, receiving the waters of a chain of lakes, the largest being Azul and Las Rocas. It also receives the waters of Ventisquero and Traidor rivers. A part of the northernmost border of Pumalín Park approximately parallels the course of the Ventisquero River. Traidor River rises in Hornopirén National Park.

A large northern tributary of the Puelo, the Manso, has its sources in Mascardi Lake and other lakes and streams south-east of the Cerro Tronador, also in Argentina, and flows south-west through the Andes to unite with the Puelo a few kilometers west of the 72nd meridian. Puelo river's lower course is impeded in such a manner as to form three small lakes, called Superior, Inferior and the Tagua Tagua Lake.
