= Reloncaví Estuary =

Estuary in Chile

Coordinates: 41°32′42″S 72°19′42″W

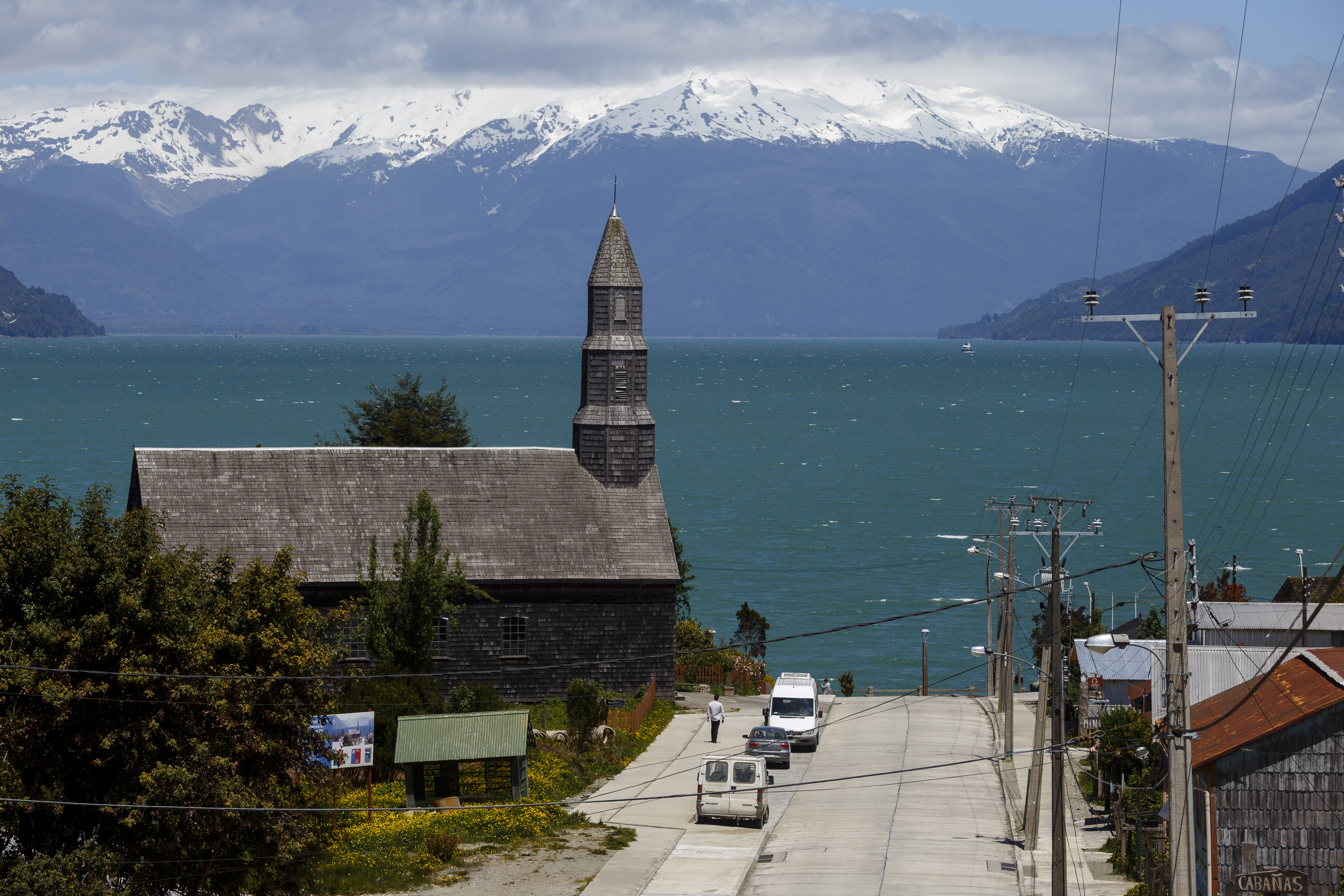
Reloncaví Estuary with Yate Volcano in the background and the town of Cochamó in the foreground.

Reloncaví Estuary (Spanish: Estuario de Reloncaví, archaic: Sin Fondo) is a fjord off Reloncaví Sound, located in the Los Lagos Region of Chile. Several National Parks and Wilderness Areas are situated in the vicinity of this fjord. Among them are Alerce Andino National Park, Hornopirén National Park, Vicente Pérez Rosales National Park, Llanquihue National Reserve and the Cochamó Valley. The Yate Volcano towers above this fjord. The Puelo River empties into this estuary. It also receives the outflow of the Todos los Santos Lake through the short tortuous Petrohué River.

The Caicura Islets lie where Reloncaví Estuary meet Reloncaví Sound in the southwestern mouth of the fjord.
