= Puelo Lake =

Lake in Argentina

Puelo Lake Lago Puelo
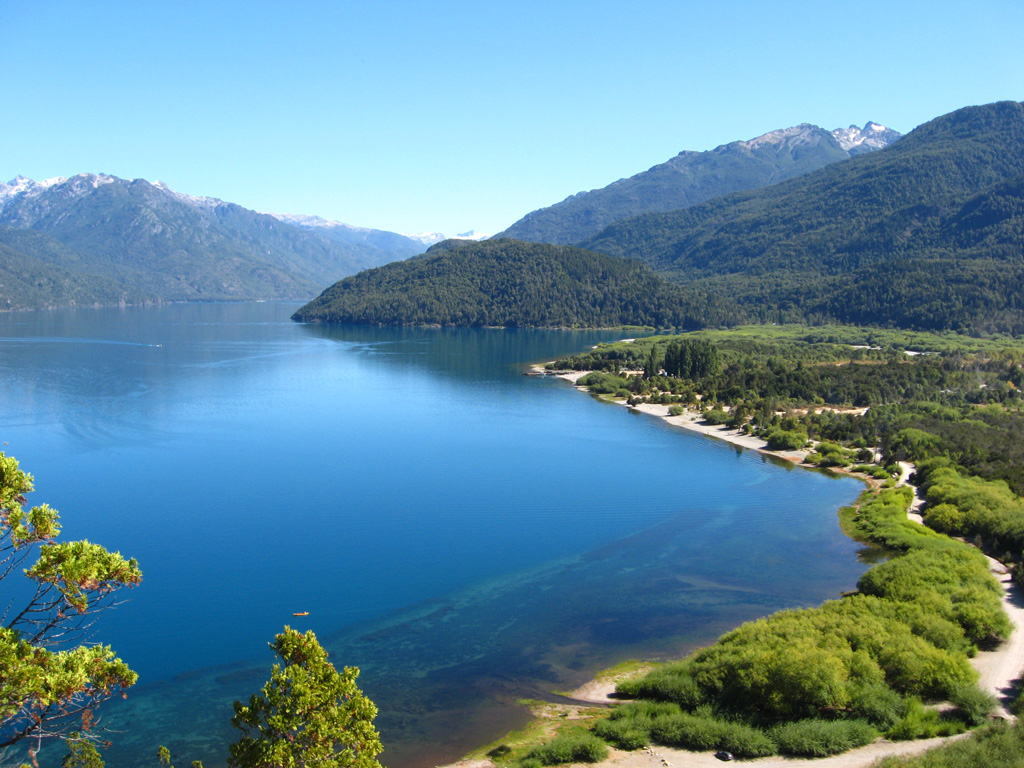

- Location within Argentina
- Location: Cushamen Department, Chubut Province, Argentina, in Patagonia
- Coordinates: 42°9′55″S 71°38′13″W
- Type: glacial
- Primary outflows: Puelo River
- Catchment area: 3,040 square kilometres (1,170 sq mi)
- Basin countries: Argentina
- Max. length: 19 kilometres (12 mi)
- Max. width: 2.5 kilometres (1.6 mi)
- Surface area: 44 square kilometres (11,000 acres)
- Average depth: 111 metres (364 ft)
- Max. depth: 180 metres (590 ft)
- Water volume: 4.9 cubic kilometres (4,000,000 acre⋅ft)
- Residence time: one year
- Surface elevation: 192 metres (630 ft)
- Settlements: Lago Puelo

Lake Puelo (Spanish: Lago Puelo) is a lake located in the northern part of Chubut Province, in Argentine Patagonia. Of fluvial-glacial origin, its deepest point is 180 meters. The narrow L-shaped lake is surrounded by Lago Puelo National Park.

The lake is fed by the small rivers, Azul and Quemquemtreu. The outflow from Puelo Lake is the Puelo River which flows to the Pacific Ocean through Chile. The river emerges from the lake at the Chilean border, flows through a narrow turbulent passage called Arroyo los Hitos about 900 metres (3,000 ft) long and into Lake Puelo Inferior (Lower Puelo Lake), entirely in Chile.

The lake is surrounded by typical Valdivian temperate rain forests, more typical of the maritime-influenced area of Chile rather than the eastern side of the Andes in Argentina.

The term Puelo seems to have its origin in the Mapuche expression puel-có, (puel = east, co = water) meaning something like "Water at the East", as it was located in the easterly part of the area occupied by the indigenous Mapuche people.

The town of Lago Puelo is located in the narrow valley of the Azul River about 5 kilometres (3.1 mi) north of the lake. Tourism is the principal industry of the town and area.
