= Lago Puelo National Park =

National park in Argentina

- IUCN category II (national park)
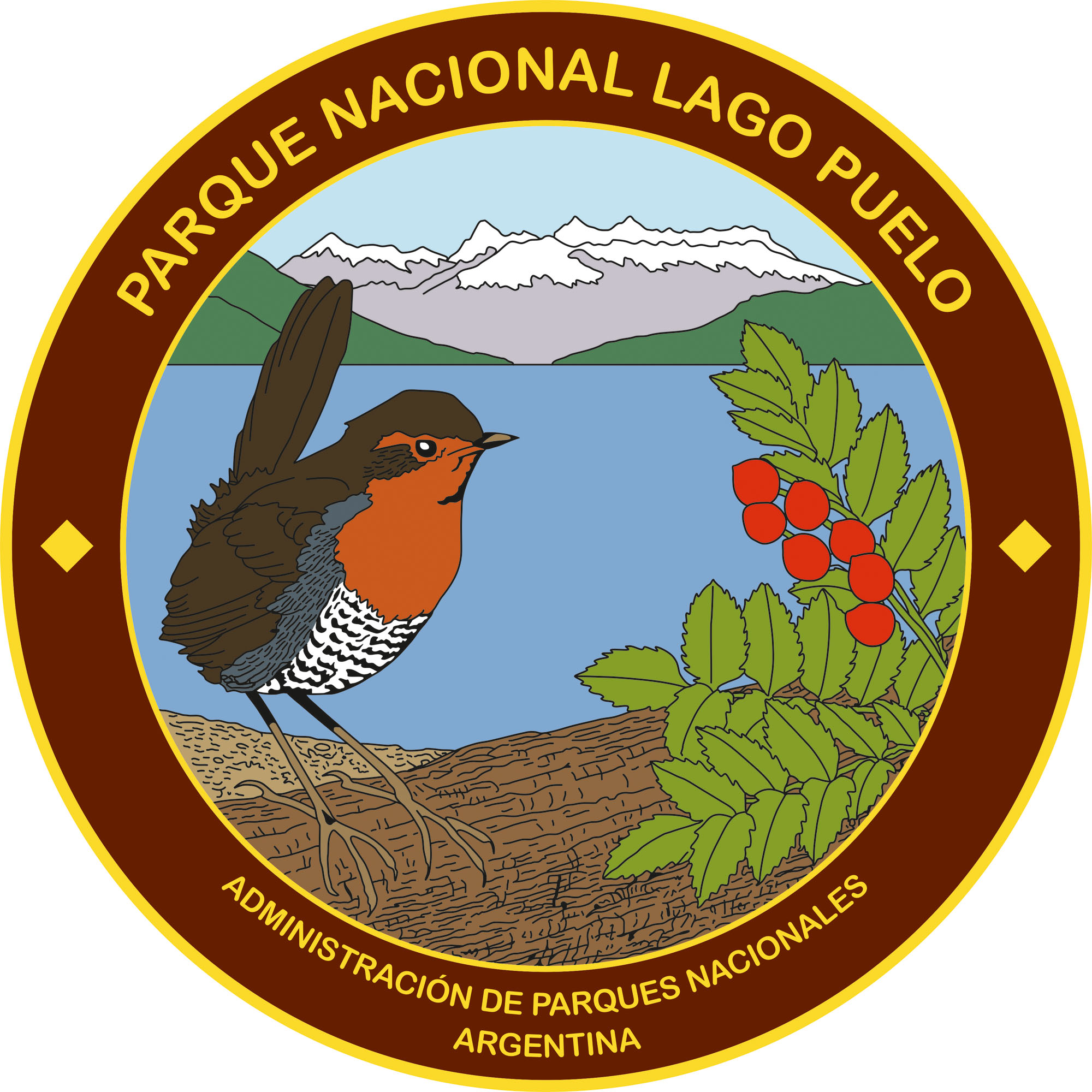
- Emblem of the Lago Puelo National Park

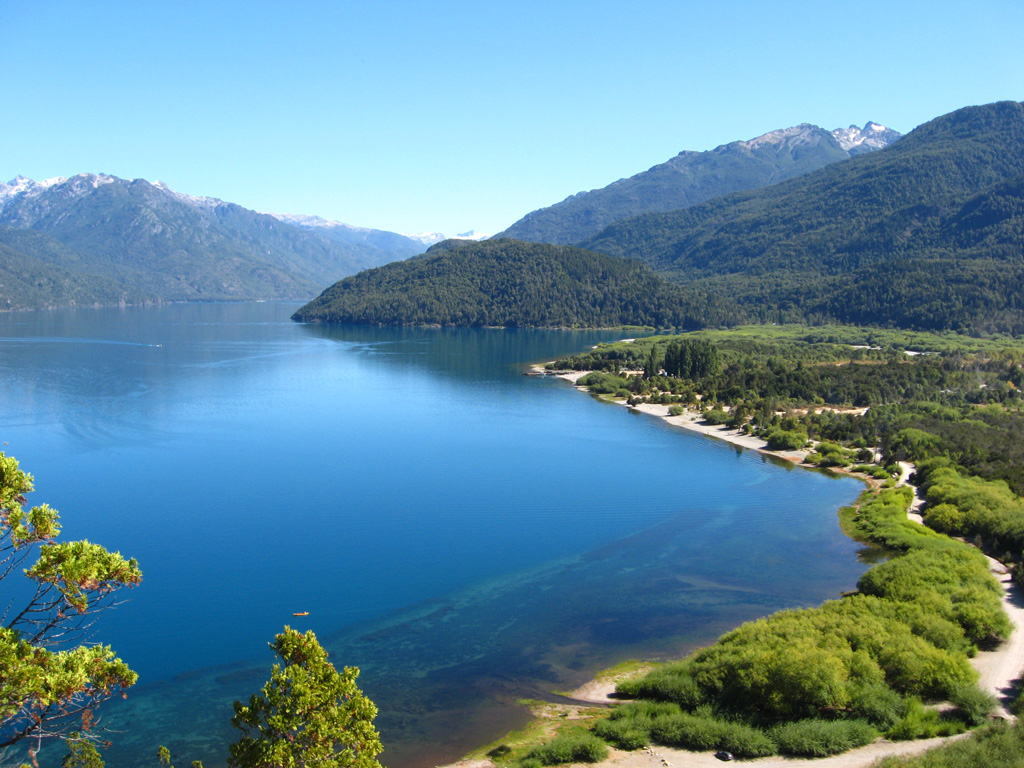
- Aerial view of Lake Puelo

- Location within Argentina
- Location: Chubut Province, Argentina
- Coordinates: 42°11′S 71°41′W
- Area: 276.74 km^{2} (106.85 sq mi)
- Established: 1971
- Governing body: Administración de Parques Nacionales

The Lago Puelo National Park (Spanish: Parque Nacional Lago Puelo) is a national park of Argentina, located in the northwest of the province of Chubut, in the Patagonia region of South America. It has an area of 276.74 square kilometres (68,380 acres). It was created to protect its scenic landscape and the Valdivian flora to augment that of the nearby Los Alerces National Park. Originally an annex to Los Alerces, it was declared a National Park and independent reserve in 1971.

The protected area is named after the Puelo Lake, and belongs to the Patagonic forest and steppes and High Andes eco-regions.

The mountainous zone where the park lies was modified by the action of glaciers, which created many rivers and lakes, including Puelo Lake the namesake of the park. The rivers of the region have high levels of glacier sediment (silt), which gives Puelo Lake its blue color.

== Climate ==
The climate is cold and wet, although more temperate than other parks in the Patagonian region. Mean temperatures range from 5 °C (41.0 °F) in winter to 17 °C (62.6 °F) in summer. Mean annual precipitation is around 1,400 mm (55 in), most of it being concentrated between May and August. Occasionally, snowfall can occur during the coldest months.

== Flora and fauna ==
Some of the flora of the park belongs to the Valdivian rain forests (Aextoxicon, Persea lingue, Eucryphia cordifolia). It also includes Austrocedrus chilensis, Nothofagus dombeyi, Nothofagus pumilio, Lomatia hirsuta and Luma apiculata. The sweetbriar (Rosa rubiginosa) is an exotic plant.

The fauna includes the Southern pudu (Pudu puda), the South Andean deer (Hippocamelus bisulcus), the culpeo (Lycalopex culpaeus), the cougar (Puma concolor), and the nutria (Myocastor coypus). Among birds we find the great grebe (Podiceps major), the flying steamer duck (Tachyeres patachonicus), the black-faced ibis (Theristicus melanopis), the Chilean flicker (Colaptes pitius) and the Austral thrush (Turdus falcklandii). The lake features native fish such as Galaxias platei and the Aplochiton taeniatus, and foreign species of trout (Salmo trutta and Oncorhynchus mykiss) and European perch (Perca fluviatilis).

== History ==
The first settlers of the region were hunter-gatherers who lived in the steppe and employed stone tools to hunt guanacos. There are cave paintings within the park, apparently showing representations of paths into the forest. Nowadays Mapuche communities live in the eastern part of the park.

== Sources ==
- Administración de Parques Nacionales — National Parks Administration of Argentina (in Spanish and English)
