= Alerce Andino National Park =

National park in Chile

- IUCN category II (national park)
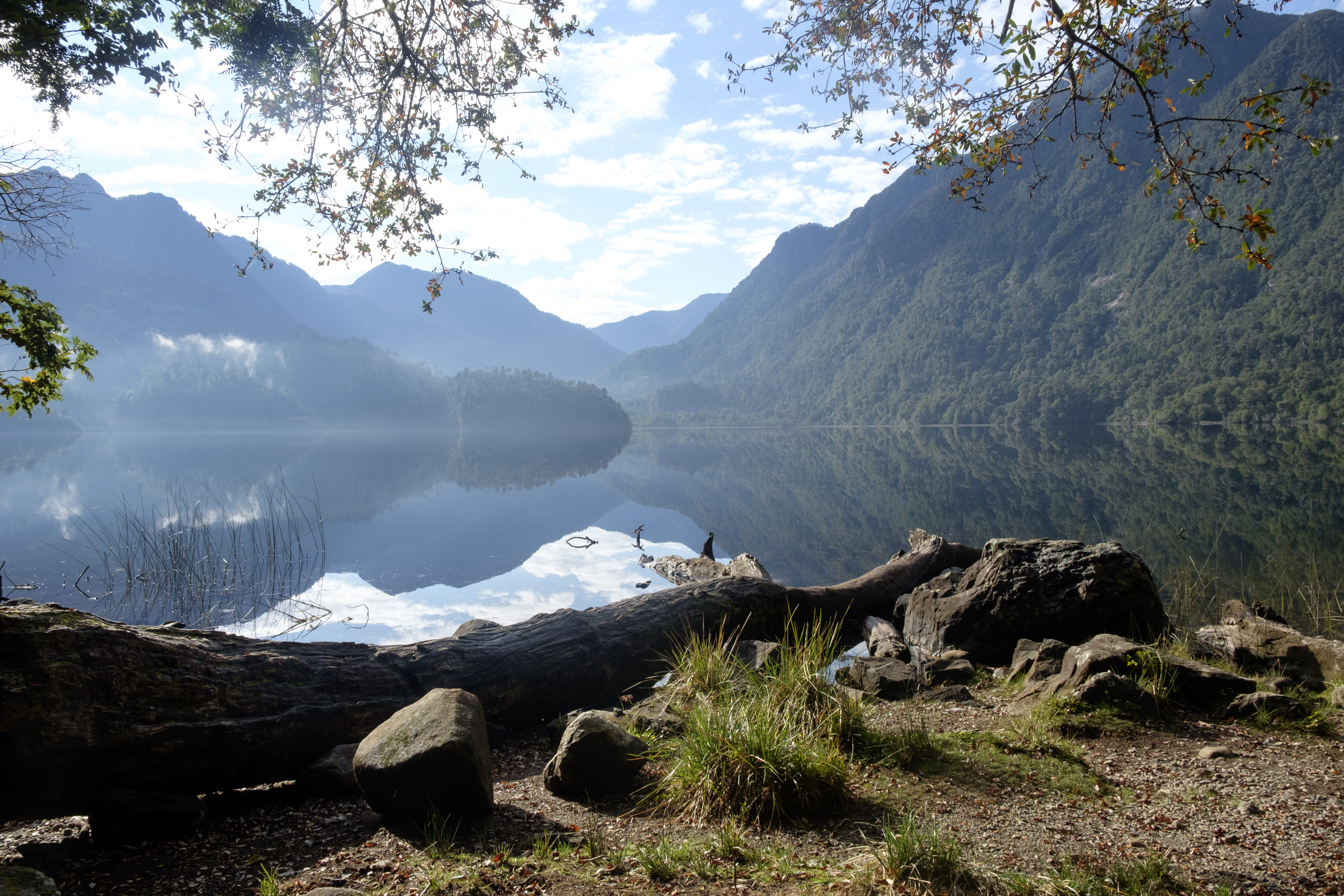
- View of Laguna Sargazo within the national park.

- Location within Chile
- Location: Los Lagos Region, Chile
- Nearest city: Puerto Montt
- Coordinates: 41.57795°S 72.54414°W
- Area: 393 km^{2} (152 sq mi)
- Established: November 22, 1982
- Visitors: 12,189 (in 2012)
- Governing body: Corporación Nacional Forestal

Alerce Andino National Park is located in the Andes, in Los Lagos Region of Chile. This national park covers about 393 km^{2}. It is bounded by the Reloncaví Estuary on its east and south sides, and by the Reloncaví Sound to the west (excluding a coastal fringe of a few km). To its north lies Chapo Lake.

The park contains about 50 lakes and natural ponds.

Management of this and other national parks in Chile is entrusted to Corporacion Nacional Forestal, CONAF.

== Flora ==
The centerpiece of this lush and mountainous protected area are the Fitzroya cupressoides (locally known as Alerce) forests, which consist of pure and mixed stands comprising a total surface of about 200 km^{2}.

== Fauna ==
The park provides important habitat for species such as pudú and monito del monte.

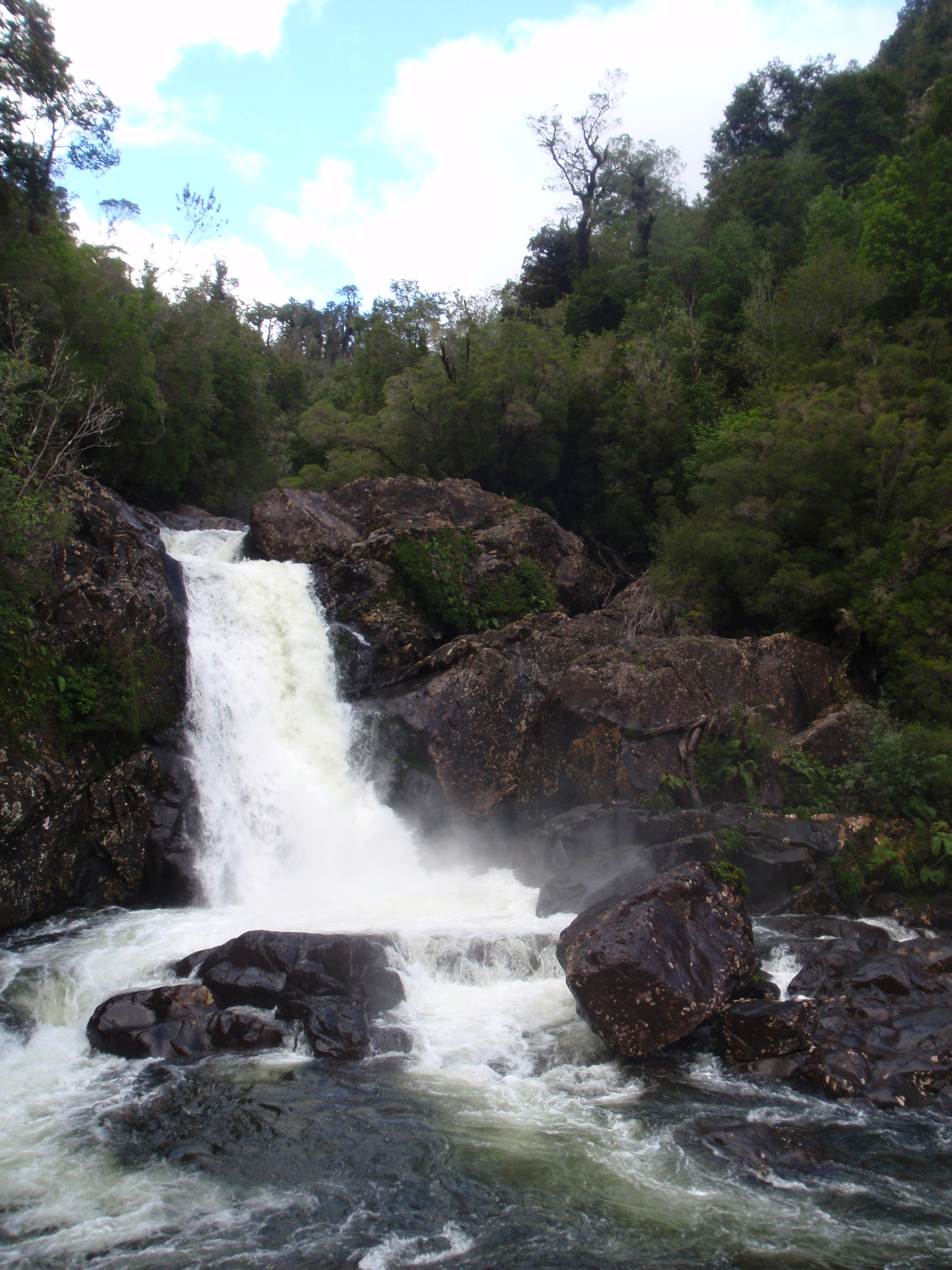
Waterfall of the Chaicas river, Alerce Andino National Park

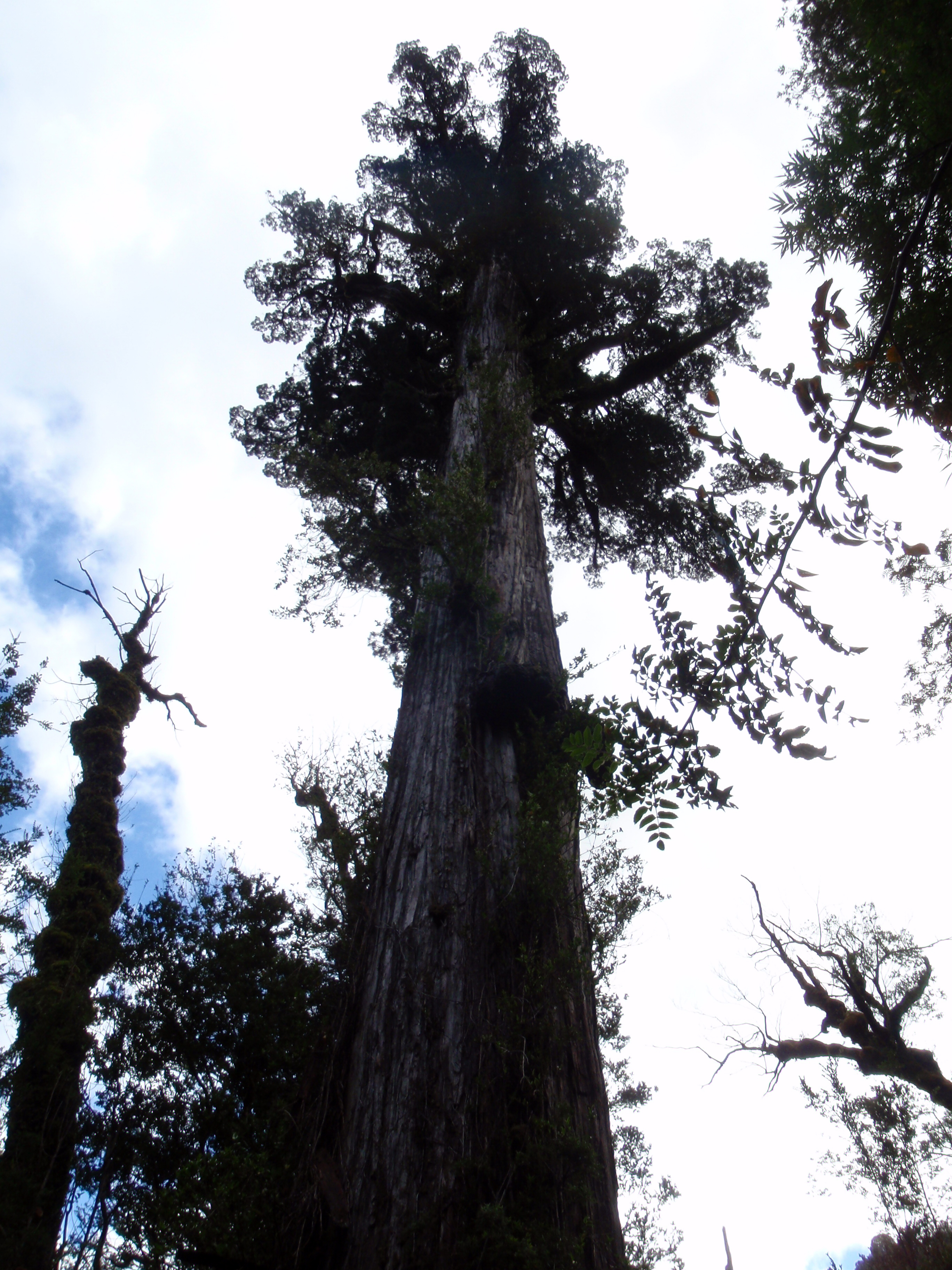
Alerce (Fitzroya) tree in the park

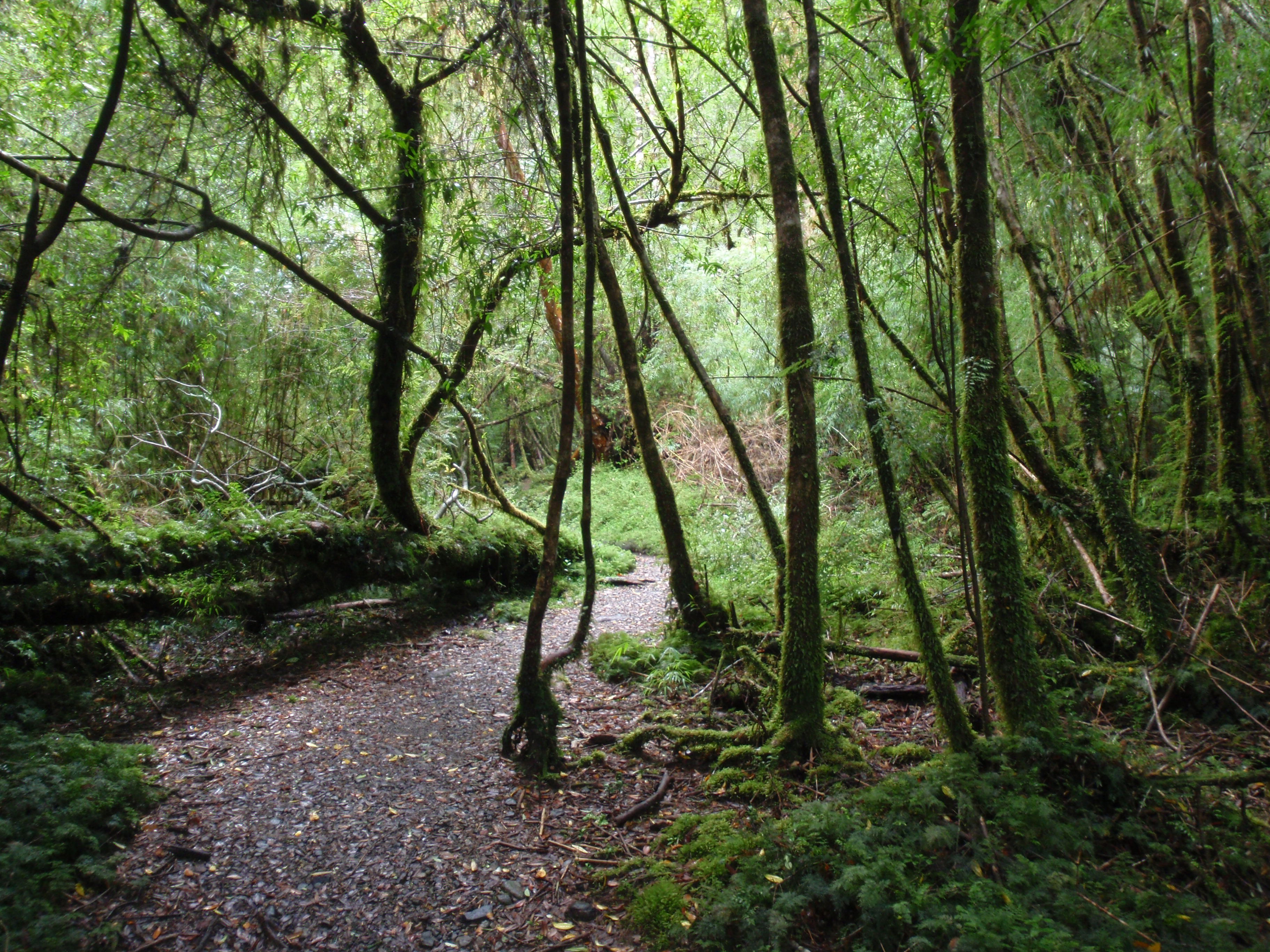
Typical understory
