= Yate (volcano) =

Mountain in Chile

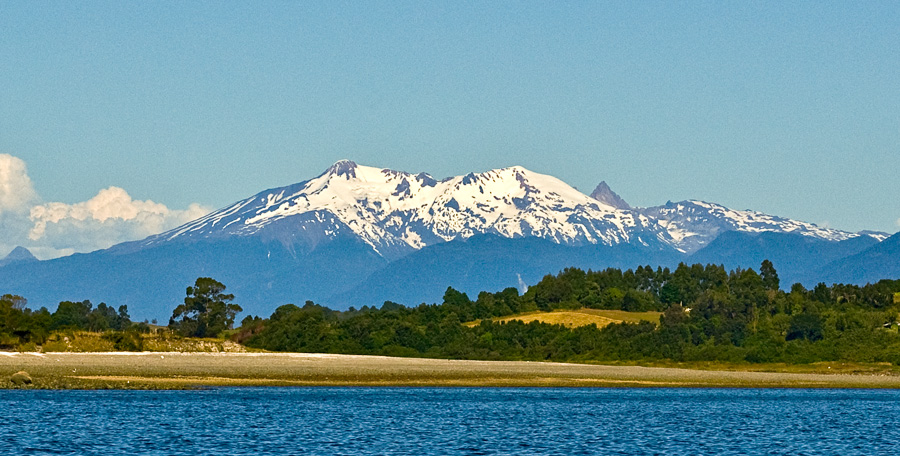
- The Yate volcano seen from Huar island in the Ancud gulf (Golfo de Ancud).

Highest point
- Elevation: 2,187 m (7,175 ft)
- Coordinates: 41°45′17″S 72°23′47″W

Geography
- Location: Chile
- Parent range: Andes

Geology
- Mountain type: Stratovolcano
- Last eruption: Unknown

Yate Volcano is a large, glaciated stratovolcano located in the southern Andes, in the Los Lagos Region of Chile, south of the Reloncaví Estuary. Yate lies on the major regional Liquiñe-Ofqui Fault Zone, and is located 10 km north-east of the smaller Hornopiren volcano. The last known eruption occurred in 1090 CE. There are no historical records of recent volcanic activity, but there is strategic evidence of smaller eruptions sometime in the Holocene. The volcano is named after Juan Yates, also known as John Yates, a settler of Puerto Americano who played a significant role in the exploration and colonisation of Patagonia.

== 1965 Landslide and Tsunami ==
On February 19, 1965 a non-eruptive landslide of ice and rock caused by unusually heavy summer rains slid rapidly into a narrow gully, descended around 1500 meters in elevation, and crashed into Lake Cabrera below. This triggered a tsunami that thundered across the lake and swept through the lakeside community of Lago Cabrera just moments later. There was virtually no warning and the community was caught by surprise. The entire village was destroyed, killing twenty-seven people. It is considered the worst volcano-related loss of life in Chile since the Villarrica eruptions of 1948–1949. The debris field left behind by the tsunami is still visible today, and the people of nearby Hornopirén commemorate the tragedy every year with a pilgrimage to the site and the memorial chapel.

== Future Dangers ==
With a warming climate, increased rain and increasing glacial meltwater may accelerate edifice collapse. This has potential implications for more landslide hazards in the area of the volcano, and tsunami risks in the lake area.

== See also ==
- List of volcanoes in Chile
