= Hornopirén =

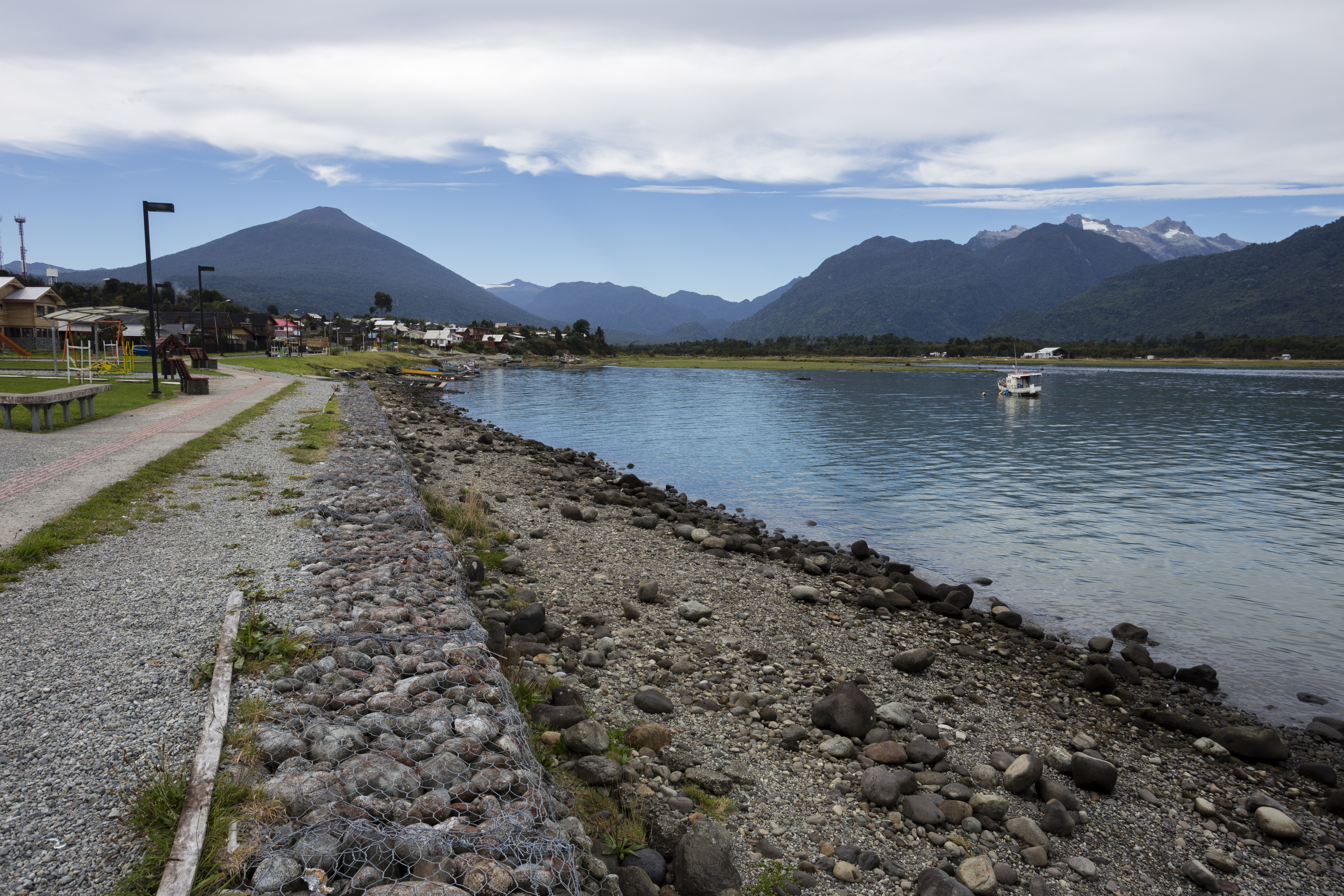
- Seaside road of Hornopirén and Hornopirén Volcano in the background.
- Interactive map of Hornopirén
- Coordinates: 41°57′58.32″S 72°28′14.16″W
- Region: Los Lagos
- Province: Palena
- Municipalidad: Hualaihué
- Comuna: Hualaihué

Government
  - Type: Municipalidad
  - Alcalde: Freddy Ibacache Muñoz
- Elevation: 15 m (49 ft)

Population (2017 census )
  - Total: 3,629
- Time zone: UTC−04:00 (Chilean Standard)
  - Summer (DST): UTC−03:00 (Chilean Daylight)
- Area code: Country + town = 56 + 65

Hornopirén is a town in the commune of Hualaihué in Palena Province, southern Chile. It lies along the northern portion of Carretera Austral. It had 3,629 inhabitants as of 2017. Hornopirén is an important tourist stop on Chile’s Carretera Austral (Highway 7) and serves as the departure point for the bi-modal car ferry system on the Carretera Austral through the Palena Province. It also provides access to Hornopirén National Park and the Northern Patagonia Fjordlands. Boat trips run from the town to remote hot springs and campgrounds in the fjordlands.
