= Yrigoyen =

Yrigoyen may refer to:

== People ==
- Manuel Yrigoyen Diez Canseco, Peruvian politician in the early 20th century
- Hipólito Yrigoyen (1852–1933), twice President of Argentina (from 1916 to 1922 and again from 1928 to 1930)

== Places ==
- Hipólito Yrigoyen, Santa Cruz, village and municipality in Santa Cruz Province in southern Argentina
- Hipólito Yrigoyen, Misiones, village and municipality in Misiones Province in northeastern Argentina
- Hipólito Yrigoyen Partido, district in Buenos Aires Province in central Argentina
- Hipólito Yrigoyen, Salta, town and municipality in Salta Province in northwestern Argentina

== See also ==
- Irigoyen
- Hipólito Yrigoyen (disambiguation)
