= List of rivers of the Aysén Region =

The information regarding List of rivers in the Aysén Region on this page has been compiled from the data supplied by GeoNames. It includes all features named "Rio", "Canal", "Arroyo", "Estero" and those Feature Code is associated with a stream of water. (Note: The arbitrarily selected codes are RPDS, CHN, CNLA, CNLB, CNLD, CNLI, CNLN, CNLSB, CRKT, DTCH, DTCHI, DTCHD, ESTY, FORD, SBED, STM, STMA, STMB, STMC, STMD, STMH, STMI, STMIX, STMM, STMQ, STMS, STMSB, STMX, TNLC, WTRC, WTRH) This list contains 297 water streams.

== Content ==
This list contains:

1. Name of the stream, in Spanish Language
2. Coordinates are latitude and longitude of the feature in ± decimal degrees, at the mouth of the stream
3. Link to a map including the Geonameid (a number which uniquely identifies a Geoname feature)
4. Feature Code explained in
5. Other names for the same feature, if any
6. Basin countries additional to Chile, if any

== List ==
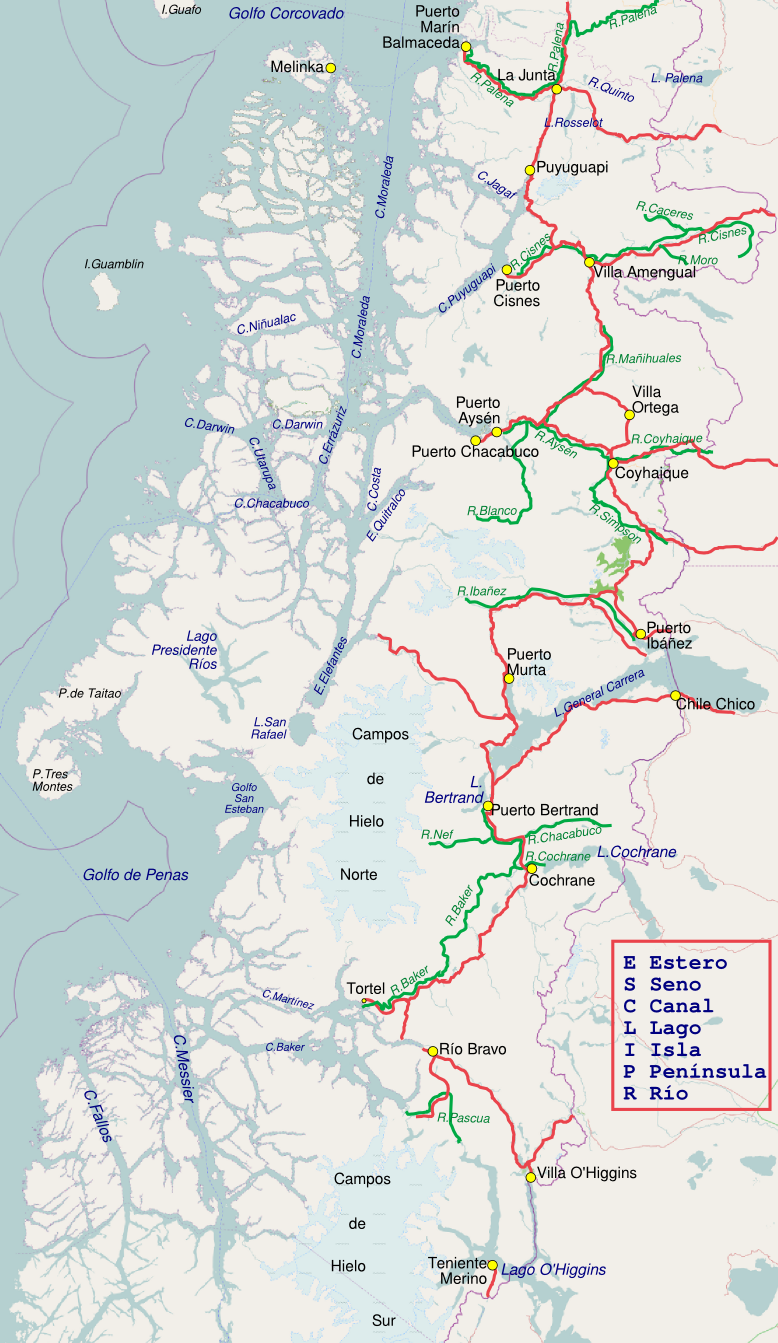
Aysén Region

- Río Buta Palena • 43.76764°S 72.97577°W • 3877639 • STM • (Rio Buta Palena, Rio Carrenleufu, Rio Corcobado, Rio Corcovado, Rio Palena, Río Buta Palena, Río Carrenleufú, Río Corcobado, Río Corcovado, Río Palena)
  - Río Frio • 43.68845°S 72.31962°W • 3969738 • STM
    - Río Oeste • 43.66292°S 72.32830°W • 3969744 • STM
  - Rio Risopatrón • 44.06021°S 72.44659°W • 7116152 • STM
    - Río Cesar • 44.14127°S 72.46646°W • 12086909 • STM
  - Río Rosselot • 43.96310°S 72.40191°W • 3872781 • STM
    - Río Figueroa • 44.05725°S 72.2691°W • 3889512 • STM
      - Río Pico • 44.21799°S 71.9565°W • 3841332 • STM • (Rio Pico, Río Pico) • (AR, CL)
- Río Jeinemeni • 46.53333°S 71.66667°W • 3853518 • STM • (Rio Jeinemeni, Río Jeinemeni) • (CL)
- Rio Mosco • 48.4818°S 72.56573°W • 3843612 • STM • (Rio Mosco, Río Mosco) • (AR, CL)
- Estero Laura • 43.79694°S 72.35733°W • 3969747 • STM
- Río Rodríguez • 43.83182°S 72.74129°W • 3872940 • STM
- Estero Pampita • 43.84011°S 72.35845°W • 3969749 • STM
- Río Añihué • 43.87649°S 72.98698°W • 3969665 • STM
- Estero Mirta • 43.89424°S 72.3742°W • 3969751 • STM
- Arroyo Siberia • 43.93042°S 71.72905°W • 3870936 • STM • (Arroyo Siberia, Rio Silberia, Río Silberia)
- Río Palena • 43.93771°S 72.40952°W • 3894564 • STM
- Rio Cuarto • 43.9395°S 72.21356°W • 7116147 • STM
- Río Bahía Mala • 43.94339°S 72.97806°W • 3969631 • STM
- Río Claro Solar • 43.94661°S 72.34325°W • 3969754 • STM
- Río Cuevas • 43.95938°S 73.2593°W • 3969628 • STM • (Rio Cuevas, Rio Water, Río Cuevas, Río Water)
- Estero El Negro • 43.95994°S 72.44659°W • 3969753 • STM
- Río Quinto • 43.9628°S 72.22258°W • 3969758 • STM
- Estero Veco • 43.96407°S 72.72494°W • 3969668 • STM
- Rio Melimoyu • 43.96811°S 72.77481°W • 7116155 • STM
- Río Santo Domingo • 43.9733°S 73.09891°W • 3969629 • STM
- Río Eric • 43.99453°S 72.6215°W • 3969669 • STM
- Río Correntoso • 43.99471°S 72.54592°W • 3893458 • STM
- Estero Mallines • 44.01835°S 72.00556°W • 3969846 • STM
- Rio Dinamarca • 44.02924°S 72.59036°W • 7116150 • STM
- Estero Rosado • 44.14188°S 72.36929°W • 3872839 • STM
- Río Dientes • 44.15027°S 71.89798°W • 3892444 • STM
- Río Bordalí • 44.18181°S 72.35591°W • 3898043 • STM
- Río Nevados • 44.19377°S 71.91646°W • 3878706 • STM
- Arroyo Pan de Azúcar • 44.24008°S 71.87601°W • 3877437 • STM
- Río Cacique Blanco • 44.27513°S 71.91916°W • 3897466 • STM
- Río Turbio • 44.30813°S 72.02946°W • 3868883 • STM
- Río Pascua • 44.31667°S 72.56667°W • 3877110 • STM
- Río Ventisquero • 44.38194°S 72.57972°W • 3868467 • STM
- Arroyo del Poncho • 44.38836°S 71.99604°W • 3875462 • STM
- Río Jorobado • 44.42109°S 72.00893°W • 3886840 • STM
- Río Pedregoso • 44.43484°S 72.15752°W • 3876899 • STM
- Estero Negro • 44.44232°S 72.08209°W • 3878809 • STM
- Arroyo Loma Huacha • 44.44563°S 71.33826°W • 3882622 • STM
- Río Neptune • 44.47308°S 71.6398°W • 3878738 • STM
- Río Pantanos • 44.47882°S 71.64734°W • 3877290 • STM
- Estero de las Casas • 44.51342°S 71.30946°W • 3896368 • STM
- Río Mallín Chileno • 44.52028°S 71.67938°W • 3880831 • STM • (Rio Mallin, Rio Mallin Chileno, Rio Mallín, Río Mallín Chileno)
- Río Magdalena • 44.52889°S 71.70592°W • 3881025 • STM
- Estero Las Golondrinas • 44.53724°S 71.79515°W • 3884347 • STM
- Río Overo Negro • 44.53959°S 71.78023°W • 3877899 • STM
- Río Queulat • 44.53983°S 72.50771°W • 3874322 • STM
- Río de la Loma Baja • 44.54297°S 71.71987°W • 3882639 • STM • (Rio La Loma Baja, Rio de la Loma Baja, Río La Loma Baja, Río de la Loma Baja)
- Estero La Turbina • 44.54884°S 71.39503°W • 3883647 • STM
- Estero Los Patos • 44.55309°S 71.30312°W • 3881624 • STM • (Arroyo de los Patos, Estero Los Patos, Estero los Patos)
- Estero Piedras • 44.57119°S 72.41974°W • 3876091 • STM
- Estero Winchester • 44.58687°S 71.47618°W • 3867815 • STM
- Estero Buitre • 44.5923°S 71.52452°W • 3897760 • STM
- Río Pedregoso • 44.60769°S 71.60262°W • 3876898 • STM
- Estero Esperanza • 44.6255°S 72.27384°W • 3889836 • STM
- Río Cisnes • 44.63757°S 71.67283°W • 3897542 • STM
- Estero Solís • 44.64234°S 71.68307°W • 3870708 • STM
- Río Moro • 44.66561°S 71.81229°W • 3879323 • STM
- Río Grande • 44.66569°S 72.28828°W • 3888774 • STM
- Arroyo Las Quemas • 44.67184°S 71.97363°W • 3883976 • STM
- Río Pedregoso • 44.67348°S 71.95039°W • 3876897 • STM
- Arroyo los Matreros • 44.68196°S 71.30217°W • 3880327 • STM • (Arroyo los Matreros, Quebrada Los Matreros)
- Río Caronte • 44.68°S 71.8073°W • 3896562 • STM
- Río Torcaza • 44.68832°S 71.8663°W • 3869611 • STM
- Arroyo Los Canelos • 44.69057°S 72.02445°W • 3882287 • STM
- Estero Perdidos • 44.69732°S 71.29341°W • 3876528 • STM
- Río de las Torres • 44.72526°S 72.11841°W • 3869492 • STM
- Río Cisnes • 44.77014°S 72.6622°W • 3894594 • STM
- Río Travieso • 44.77337°S 72.2103°W • 7626597 • STM
- Río Picacho • 44.91072°S 72.53431°W • 3876346 • STM
- Rio Uspallante • 44.96443°S 73.13976°W • 7626595 • STM
- Río Picaflor • 44.99066°S 72.17709°W • 3876342 • STM
- Rio El Toqui • 44.99661°S 72.09606°W • 6342714 • STM
- Río Presidente Roosevelt • 45.00729°S 72.5132°W • 3875187 • STM
- Rio La Gloria • 45.0934°S 72.21502°W • 6343092 • STM
- Arroyo Pedregoso • 45.09506°S 72.15064°W • 3876910 • STM
- Rio Turbio • 45.10661°S 72.23253°W • 6343155 • STM
- Río Ñireguao • 45.16631°S 72.10808°W • 3878604 • STM • (Nirevao, Rio Nirehuau, Rio Nirihuao, Río Nirehuau, Río Ñirihuao, Ñirevao) • (CL)
- Rio Pangal • 45.16945°S 72.59697°W • 6458932 • STM
- Estero Feo • 45.18478°S 71.94622°W • 3889543 • STM
- Río Cañón • 45.20236°S 72.32471°W • 3896895 • STM
- Río Norte • 45.21167°S 71.70296°W • 3878510 • STM
- Arroyo Ñireguao • 45.21433°S 71.79626°W • 3878603 • STM • (Rio Coichel, Rio Goichel, Río Coichel, Río Goichel) • (CL)
- Estero del Cinco • 45.23205°S 71.69334°W • 3894621 • STM
- Río Emperador Guillermo • 45.2645°S 72.23648°W • 3890117 • STM
- Estero Negro Juan • 45.27828°S 71.61672°W • 3878759 • STM
- Rio El Malito • 45.28141°S 72.22309°W • 6354892 • STM
- Estero Richards • 45.28455°S 71.73214°W • 3873329 • STM
- Río Mañiguales • 45.29614°S 72.3333°W • 3880708 • STM • (Rio Manihuales, Rio Maniuales, Río Mañihuales, Río Mañiuales) • (CL)
- Estero Colchón • 45.29646°S 71.58772°W • 3894304 • STM
- Río Tabo • 45.29874°S 72.72675°W • 3870377 • STM
- Arroyo Punta del Monte • 45.31667°S 71.55°W • 3874761 • STM
- Río Marta • 45.33403°S 73.02043°W • 3880417 • STM
- Estero Viviana • 45.35177°S 72.45972°W • 3868027 • STM
- Río Turbio • 45.35625°S 72.66289°W • 3868882 • STM
- Rio arredondo • 45.37349°S 72.74992°W • 6327095 • STM
- Río de los Palos • 45.37434°S 72.69928°W • 3877536 • STM • (Rio de Los Palos, Río de Los Palos) • (CL)
- Rio Negro • 45.37687°S 73.13581°W • 6331621 • STM
- Río Aisen • 45.40424°S 72.64778°W • 3894563 • STM
- Rio Simpson conf .du Río Mañihuales • 45.4055°S 72.49809°W • 6330229 • STM
- Río Aisén • 45.40978°S 72.77618°W • 3900335 • STM • (Rio Aysen, Río Aysen)

- Río Simpson • 45.45917°S 72.35046°W • 3835234 • STM • (Rio Simpson, Río Simpson) • (AR)

- Río Álvarez • 45.42496°S 72.75524°W • 3899856 • STM
- Río Blanco • 45.43123°S 72.58907°W • 3898196 • STM
- Rio Pescado • 45.43303°S 73.08329°W • 6331620 • STM
- Arroyo del Salto • 45.4443°S 72.79529°W • 3872511 • STM
- Rio Condor • 45.47386°S 72.91506°W • 3898175 • STM
- Río Correntoso • 45.47506°S 72.25931°W • 3893457 • STM • (Arroyo Grande) • (CL)
- Río Riesco • 45.48011°S 72.64057°W • 3873308 • STM
- Río Candelaria • 45.48601°S 72.86287°W • 3896961 • STM
- Arroyo Pedregoso • 45.48962°S 71.62595°W • 3876909 • STM
- Arroyo Dangle • 45.49022°S 72.83524°W • 3892745 • STM • (Arroyo Dang) • (CL)
- Río Baguales • 45.50226°S 72.11426°W • 3898996 • STM • (Arroyo de los Baguales) • (CL)
- Arroyo Niebla • 45.54243°S 72.77412°W • 3878682 • STM
- Río Coihaique • 45.55926°S 71.96251°W • 3894424 • STM • (Rio Coyhaique) • (CL)
- Río Quetro • 45.56545°S 72.495°W • 3874328 • STM
- Río Claro • 45.5881°S 72.15099°W • 3894562 • STM
- Río Cóndor • 45.58834°S 72.76142°W • 3893812 • STM
- Estero San Sebastián • 45.61667°S 72.8°W • 3871706 • STM
- Río Simpson • 45.64141°S 72.14344°W • 3875500 • STM
- Rio Bongo • 45.65389°S 72.67113°W • 6331618 • STM
- Rio Quetro • 45.66265°S 72.39922°W • 6337679 • STM
- Rio Pollux • 45.70606°S 72.01813°W • 6354975 • STM
- Rio Simpson • 45.71433°S 72.12318°W • 6354877 • STM • (Aisen sur)
- Rio Zancudo • 45.73063°S 72.99437°W • 6354886 • STM
- Estero Negro • 45.76656°S 71.95873°W • 3878766 • STMI
- Rio Desplayado • 45.77327°S 73.03024°W • 6354885 • STM
- Río Desagüe • 45.7764°S 72.43302°W • 3892634 • STM
- Rio Cajòn Bravo • 45.80619°S 72.72692°W • 6354880 • STM
- Río Huemules • 45.81684°S 71.86501°W • 6354875 • STM • (Rio Simpson o Aisen sur o Galera)
- Rio El Bayo • 45.8209°S 72.43904°W • 6354884 • STM
- Rio Blanco • 45.83693°S 71.91719°W • 6354876 • STM
- Río La Paloma • 45.84004°S 72.39166°W • 3885116 • STM • (Rio Paloma, Río Paloma) • (CL)
- Río Oscuro • 45.85729°S 71.73704°W • 3877955 • STM
- Rio Cajòn Blanco • 45.86372°S 72.74391°W • 6354879 • STM
- Rio Sin Nombre • 45.87208°S 72.684°W • 6354881 • STM
- Río Los Huemules • 45.87662°S 73.41476°W • 3887666 • STM
- Arroyo Pichi Blanco • 45.89089°S 71.70522°W • 3876308 • STM
- Estero Mogotes • 45.91318°S 72.32454°W • 3879640 • STM • (Rio Mogote, Río Mogote) • (CL)
- Estero Balboa • 45.92596°S 72.30635°W • 3898923 • STM • (Rio Balboa, Río Balboa) • (CL)
- Rio Azul • 45.93636°S 72.24769°W • 7626518 • STM
- Rio Turbio • 45.95115°S 72.24678°W • 6354873 • STM
- Arroyo del Humo • 45.97597°S 71.63155°W • 3887446 • STM • (Rio Humo) • (CL)
- Río Sorpresa • 46.01318°S 73.27486°W • 3870630 • STM
- Arroyo de Nieve • 46.09323°S 72.31613°W • 3878669 • STM
- Estero del Bosque • 46.1234°S 72.16808°W • 3898012 • STM
- Estero Parado • 46.12812°S 72.22245°W • 3877222 • STM • (Arroyo Parado, Estero Parado)
- Estero Portezuelo • 46.12861°S 72.43511°W • 3875394 • STM
- Estero de las Mulas • 46.14154°S 72.12221°W • 3879210 • STM • (Arroyo de las Mulas, Estero de las Mulas)
- Estero Manso • 46.14708°S 72.33596°W • 3880670 • STM
- Estero Limpio • 46.24429°S 71.9951°W • 3883181 • STM • (Arroyo Limpio, Estero Limpio)
- Estero Claro • 46.26399°S 71.99816°W • 3894576 • STM • (Arroyo Claro, Estero Claro)
- Estero Chorrillo • 46.26949°S 71.97374°W • 3894831 • STM
- Estero Peñascoso • 46.27854°S 71.96108°W • 3876673 • STM • (Arroyo Penascoso, Arroyo Peñascoso, Estero Penascoso, Estero Peñascoso)
- Río Teresa • 46.28053°S 73.23143°W • 3869954 • STM
- Río Ibáñez • 46.28605°S 71.96792°W • 3887400 • STM
- Estero Lechoso • 46.29504°S 71.93166°W • 3883450 • STM • (Arroyo Lechoso, Estero Lechoso)
- Arroyo Las Ánimas • 46.29566°S 71.91859°W • 3884645 • STM
- Río María Luisa • 46.30313°S 74.33142°W • 3880487 • STM
- Arroyo del Salto • 46.3038°S 71.81909°W • 3872510 • STM • (Arroyo Fiero, Arroyo del Salto)
- Estero Huemula • 46.30936°S 71.8528°W • 3887672 • STM • (Arroyo Huemula, Estero Huemul, Estero Huemula)
- Río Exploradores • 46.31386°S 73.4424°W • 3889646 • STM
- Río Huiña • 46.31564°S 72.87506°W • 3887509 • STM
- Río Presidente Ríos • 46.32532°S 74.04577°W • 3875189 • STM
- Río Sur • 46.34989°S 73.43485°W • 3870447 • STM
- Río Beatriz • 46.35332°S 74.10338°W • 3898538 • STM
- Arroyo Largo • 46.37133°S 71.87462°W • 3884731 • STM
- Arroyo Horquetas • 46.37974°S 71.91685°W • 3887835 • STM
- Río Oscuro • 46.38202°S 73.15702°W • 3877954 • STM
- Río Verde • 46.38213°S 73.2767°W • 3868410 • STM
- Río Murta • 46.40307°S 72.71027°W • 3879144 • STM
- Río Circo • 46.42792°S 73.26061°W • 3894610 • STM
- Río Engaño • 46.44235°S 72.76829°W • 3890082 • STM
- Río Resbalón • 46.44353°S 72.67473°W • 3873405 • STM
- Río Avellanos • 46.45749°S 72.28008°W • 3899097 • STM • (Rio Avellanas, Río Avellanas) • (CL)
- Estero del Baño • 46.48956°S 71.84346°W • 3898810 • STM
- Río Norte • 46.48997°S 73.08712°W • 3878509 • STM
- Arroyo de las Chacras • 46.50416°S 71.81973°W • 3895714 • STM
- Río Gualas • 46.51777°S 73.70316°W • 3888565 • STM
- Arroyo Los Chacales • 46.51919°S 72.30583°W • 3882228 • STM
- Arroyo Escondido • 46.51942°S 72.33742°W • 3889928 • STM
- Arroyo Rocillo • 46.52297°S 72.38033°W • 3872986 • STM
- Arroyo Tornillo • 46.5237°S 72.25857°W • 3869596 • STM
- Río Témpanos • 46.53547°S 73.91488°W • 3870019 • STM
- Estero Newman • 46.53586°S 74.9181°W • 3878704 • STM
- Arroyo Pedrero • 46.53761°S 72.35493°W • 3876895 • STM
- Arroyo de las Casas • 46.53912°S 71.947°W • 3896369 • STM
- Arroyo Burgos • 46.54327°S 71.72696°W • 3897708 • STM
- Río Blanco • 46.56358°S 72.51011°W • 3898194 • STM
- Río Dorotea • 46.59151°S 73.9652°W • 3892235 • STM
- Estero La Horqueta • 46.60902°S 71.69494°W • 3885644 • STM
- Río Tranquilo • 46.6093°S 72.74074°W • 3869307 • STM
- Estero La Pirámide • 46.60934°S 71.69464°W • 3885008 • STM
- Arroyo Colorado • 46.6184°S 71.94155°W • 3894102 • STM
- Río Negro • 46.70713°S 74.09959°W • 3878765 • STM
- Río Lucac • 46.70739°S 74.09869°W • 3881229 • STM
- Estero Quebrada Honda • 46.7094°S 71.69764°W • 3874493 • STM
- Río Leones • 46.71777°S 72.93582°W • 3883332 • STM
- Río Fiero • 46.71892°S 73.10754°W • 3889521 • STM
- Río Aldunate • 46.71964°S 74.5666°W • 3900210 • STM
- Estero Pedregoso • 46.7298°S 71.73449°W • 3876903 • STM
- Río Oscar • 46.74546°S 74.72917°W • 3877961 • STM
- Río Mañiguales • 46.7572°S 74.23508°W • 3880707 • STM • (Rio Maniguales, Rio Manihuales, Rio Maniuales, Rió Mañihuales, Río Mañiguales, Río Mañiualés)
- Río San Tadeo • 46.76098°S 74.22508°W • 3871608 • STM
- Río Grande • 46.76408°S 71.92138°W • 3888773 • STM
- Río Delta • 46.76634°S 72.80033°W • 3892663 • STM • (Rio Delta, Rio de las Deltas, Río Delta, Río de las Deltas)
- Arroyo Lucio • 46.76767°S 71.92515°W • 3881208 • STM
- Río Nieves • 46.79817°S 71.90556°W • 3878666 • STM
- Río Guisoca • 46.81986°S 71.96168°W • 3888253 • STM
- Río Amarillo • 46.82458°S 71.97382°W • 3899797 • STM
- Estero Bertrand • 46.96994°S 72.83758°W • 3898404 • STM
- Río Soler • 46.98119°S 73.12912°W • 3870710 • STM
- Estero Chico • 47.04478°S 72.82005°W • 3895193 • STM
- Río Fudoso • 47.04743°S 72.32849°W • 3889254 • STM
- Río Aserradero Quemado • 47.04767°S 72.43423°W • 3899240 • STM
- Estero Grande • 47.06811°S 72.79793°W • 3888815 • STM
- Río Claudio Vicuña • 47.08018°S 72.13177°W • 3894559 • STM
- Rio Chacabuco • 47.08392°S 72.48985°W • 6324480 • STM
- Río Pancho Campos • 47.08918°S 72.77506°W • 3877446 • STM
- Río Chacabuco Confluent du rio Baker • 47.12761°S 72.61414°W • 3895793 • STM
- Estero El Molino • 47.1441°S 72.73858°W • 3890977 • STM
- Río Maitén • 47.16964°S 72.83936°W • 3880957 • STM
- Arroyo Mayor • 47.17664°S 72.6205°W • 3880272 • STM
- Estero El Auque • 47.24177°S 72.27322°W • 3891925 • STM
- Arroyo Frutillar • 47.24502°S 72.43041°W • 3889261 • STM
- Arroyo del Diablo • 47.2642°S 72.48634°W • 3892535 • STM
- Río Brown • 47.26688°S 72.12833°W • 3897872 • STM
- Arroyo Elba • 47.26715°S 72.47598°W • 3891922 • STM
- Río del Salto • 47.29553°S 72.6913°W • 3872500 • STM
- Arroyo Runque • 47.3337°S 72.17674°W • 3872684 • STM
- Arroyo El Bosque • 47.38904°S 72.59859°W • 3891834 • STM
- Estero La Cañada • 47.44952°S 72.5805°W • 3886374 • STM
- Río Tranquilo • 47.46415°S 72.55594°W • 3869306 • STM
- Arroyo San Lorenzo • 47.49737°S 72.37312°W • 3871977 • STM
- Río de Los Ñadis • 47.50352°S 72.89566°W • 3881696 • STM • (Rio de Los Nadis, Rio de las Nadis, Río de Los Ñadis, Río de las Ñadis) • (CL)
- Río Barrancos • 47.5141°S 72.86571°W • 3898701 • STM
- Río Ventisquero • 47.54548°S 73.14285°W • 3868466 • STM
- Arroyo Pedregoso • 47.60886°S 73.05722°W • 3876908 • STM
- Arroyo Tranquera • 47.60917°S 72.92278°W • 3869316 • STM
- Arroyo Abutarda • 47.62072°S 72.8132°W • 3900722 • STM
- Río Baker • 47.6256°S 73.0481°W • 3898929 • STM

- Rio IbáñezNef • 46.10299°S 72.54547°W • 6355188 • STM
- Río Nef • 47.12061°S 72.90527°W • 3878958 • STM • (Rio Neff, Río Neff) • (CL)
- Río Cochrane • 47.24708°S 72.60487°W • 3894476 • STM
- Río de La Colonia • 47.31066°S 72.93308°W • 3886222 • STM • (Rio Activo, Rio de la Colonia, Río de la Colonia) • (CL)

- Arroyo El Corral • 47.62639°S 72.82112°W • 3891547 • STM
- Río Huemules • 47.62716°S 73.67249°W • 3887665 • STM
- Arroyo León • 47.64218°S 73.00754°W • 3883384 • STM
- Arroyo La Gateada • 47.68515°S 72.81086°W • 3885884 • STM
- Río Vargas • 47.70029°S 73.10783°W • 3868581 • STM
- Arroyo El Encuentro • 47.70296°S 73.09354°W • 3891405 • STM
- Arroyo Catarata • 47.71531°S 72.83438°W • 3896170 • STM
- Río Santo Domingo • 47.72639°S 73.26508°W • 3871311 • STM
- Río Negro • 47.76785°S 73.38721°W • 3878764 • STM
- Río Bravo • 47.96464°S 73.22611°W • 3897946 • STM
- Río Llanada • 48.012°S 72.94164°W • 3882999 • STM
- Río Año Nuevo • 48.03545°S 72.98704°W • 3899560 • STM
- Río del Arco • 48.04157°S 73.00124°W • 3899415 • STM
- Río Boston • 48.05379°S 72.63326°W • 3898008 • STM
- Río Desplayes • 48.05454°S 72.64167°W • 3892558 • STM • (Rio Desplayer, Rio Desplayes, Río Desplayer, Río Desplayes)
- Río del Norte • 48.06572°S 72.65788°W • 3878506 • STM
- Río Sordo • 48.07865°S 72.93837°W • 3870645 • STM
- Río Tranque • 48.08948°S 72.93451°W • 3869318 • STM
- Río Ventisquero • 48.10715°S 72.72123°W • 3868465 • STM
- Río Resbole • 48.10918°S 72.91372°W • 3873403 • STM
- Río Quetru • 48.11667°S 73.15°W • 3874325 • STM
- Río Pililos • 48.12178°S 72.73042°W • 3875994 • STM
- Río Resbalón • 48.12868°S 72.83442°W • 3873404 • STM
- Río Ventisquero • 48.2045°S 72.34696°W • 3868464 • STM
- Arroyo Sucio • 48.20988°S 72.32298°W • 3870506 • STM
- Río Pérez • 48.21066°S 72.33352°W • 3876504 • STM
- Río Pascua • 48.22673°S 73.20225°W • 3877109 • STM

- Río Mayer • 48.45232°S 72.58461°W • 3844658 • STM • (Rio Mayer, Río Mayer) • (AR)

- Río Bórquez • 48.26169°S 73.31271°W • 3898019 • STM
- Río Azul • 48.2673°S 72.3438°W • 3899027 • STM
- Río Colorado • 48.32786°S 72.65738°W • 3894023 • STM
- Río Engaño • 48.33333°S 72.66667°W • 3890081 • STM
- Río Gabriel Quiroz • 48.33554°S 73.04303°W • 3889214 • STM
- Río Pablo • 48.3364°S 73.03728°W • 3877850 • STM
- Río El Bagual • 48.34722°S 72.49332°W • 3891919 • STM
- Río Ventisquero • 48.37267°S 72.86339°W • 3868463 • STM
- Río Engaño • 48.43831°S 72.8014°W • 3890080 • STM
- Río Vargas • 48.46245°S 72.6313°W • 3868580 • STM
- Río George • 48.49118°S 74.39194°W • 3889005 • STM
- Río Portezuelo • 48.66309°S 72.60505°W • 3875389 • STM
- Ríos Pocas Pilchas • 48.67079°S 72.99007°W • 3875583 • STM
- Río Bravo • 48.68333°S 73.16667°W • 3897945 • STM
- Río Manso • 48.6875°S 73.11821°W • 3880669 • STM
- Río Aros • 48.70017°S 72.55027°W • 3899322 • STM
- Río Villalón • 48.755°S 72.55109°W • 3868171 • STM
- Río Turbio • 48.77248°S 72.9343°W • 3868881 • STM
- Río Pérez • 48.8°S 72.75°W • 3876503 • STM
- Río Obstáculo • 48.86217°S 72.74451°W • 3878392 • STM

== See also ==
- List of lakes in Chile
- List of volcanoes in Chile
- List of islands of Chile
- List of fjords, channels, sounds and straits of Chile
- List of lighthouses in Chile
