= Hipólito Yrigoyen (disambiguation) =

Hipólito Yrigoyen was the 19th president of Argentina.

Hipólito Yrigoyen may also refer to:

- Hipólito Yrigoyen Partido, a district in Buenos Aires Province, Argentina
- Hipólito Yrigoyen, Misiones, a village in Argentina
- Hipólito Yrigoyen, Salta, a town in Argentina
- Hipólito Yrigoyen, Santa Cruz, a village in Argentina
