= Posadas Lake =

Lake in Argentina

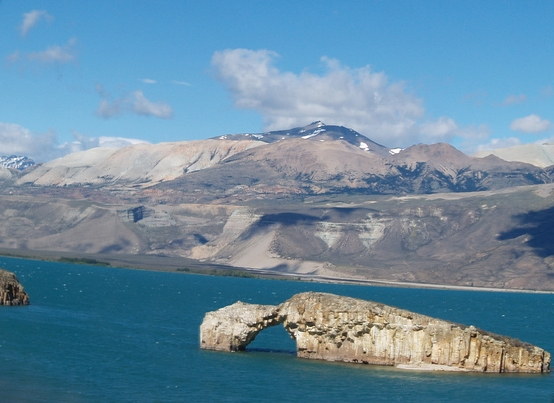

- Location within Santa Cruz Province
- Location: Río Chico Department, Santa Cruz Province, Argentina
- Coordinates: 47°30′S 71°50′W
- Basin countries: Argentina
- Surface area: 45.3 km^{2} (17.5 sq mi)
- Surface elevation: 112 m (367 ft)

Lake Posadas is a lake located on the edge of the southern Andes, northwest of Santa Cruz Province, Argentina, near the border between Argentina and Chile.

Its turquoise waters and a curious tunnel-shaped rock at the centre makes a distinctive landscape. A narrow land bridge separates the northern end of Lake Posadas from the bigger, deeper Cochrane/Pueyrredón Lake.

== Description ==
Bordered by glacial moraines, Lake Posadas is located on the eastern slope of the Andes mountain range. It belongs to the Argentine-Chilean binational basin of the Baker River which drains into the Pacific Ocean. It has an important affluent, the Tarde River, and two others minor ones and it drains into Lake Pueyrredón through a short river reach. Mean annual rainfall is 200 mm and annual temperature is 4.5 °C.

Lake Posadas, somewhat triangular in shape, has cliffs, ravines and volcanic tuffs with no plant cover on its northeastern slope. Towards its eastern end, open steppe shrubs prevail (Senecio spp, Schinus molle, Nassauvia ulicina) with Adesmia boronioides and scanty broom sedge (Andropogon argenteus). On its southern shore there are fluvio-glacial fans bordered by patches of thickets composed of "duraznillo" (Colliguaya integerrima), "calafate" (Berberis heterophylla), and "neneo" (Mulinum spinosum). The lake's shores are stony with scanty vegetation in low shrubs.

The basin of the lakes Posadas/Pueyrredón and Ghio is the lowest glacier depression in the southern Patagonian Andes, raising only 500 ft over the sea level. Lago Posadas, fed by the glacier rushing streams of the Furioso and Tarde rivers, receives with the thawing suspended matter that confers its unmistakable color. Separated from the crystalline and deep blue Lago Pueyrredón by the isthmus (La Península), now drains into it, and both to the Pacific Ocean. In older times, the waters flowed to the Atlantic. From remote times the basin sheltered both human and animal life, of which give proof important archaeological remains; a guide is recommended.

== Tourism ==
The town of Hipólito Yrigoyen (Lago Posadas) and the National Route 40 (Argentina) are located in the vicinity of the lake. This guarantees accessibility, lodging infrastructure and services for visitors.

The whole region is known as a trout and salmonidae fishing destination, and a place also suitable for trekking, kayaking and rural tourism.

From Lake Posadas it's also possible to travel to Cañadón del río Pinturas, entering the Patagonian steppe. There is a sector called Cueva de las Manos ("Cave of Hands"; where many ancient paintings can be found. These painting are 10000 years old.
