= Irigoyen =

- Etymology: Basque: "upper village"
- Place of origin: Gipuzkoa, Spain

Irigoyen is a surname. Notable people with the surname include:

- Adam Irigoyen (born 1997), American actor
- Álvaro Arzú Irigoyen (1946–2018), Guatemalan politician, former President
- Bernardo de Irigoyen (1822–1906), Argentine lawyer, diplomat and politician
- Bernardo Irigoyen (born 1969), Argentine cricketer
- Elsa Irigoyen (1919–2001), Argentine fencer
- José Irigoyen (before 1797 – c. 1839), appointed Spanish governor of Texas who never arrived to claim his office
- Julio Irigoyen (1894–1967), Argentine film director
- María Irigoyen (born 1987), Argentine professional tennis player
- Martín Irigoyen (born 1977), Argentine musician, composer and one of the pioneers of the steampunk sound
- Matías de Irigoyen (1781–1839), Argentine soldier and politician
- Miguel de Irigoyen (1764–1822), Argentine soldier and police chief
- Roberto Irigoyen (before 1923 – after 1948), Argentine cinematographer
- William Irigoyen (born 1970), French journalist

== Fictional characters ==
- Iman (comics) (Diego Irigoyen), fictional superhero from DC Comics

== See also ==
- Bernardo de Irigoyen, Misiones, city in the province of Misiones, Argentina
- Bernardo de Irigoyen, Santa Fe, town (comuna) in the center-east of the province of Santa Fe, Argentina
- Yrigoyen (disambiguation) (also Yrigollen)
