= Cochrane/Pueyrredón Lake =

Lake in Santa Cruz Province, Argentina

Pueyrredón/Cochrane Lake
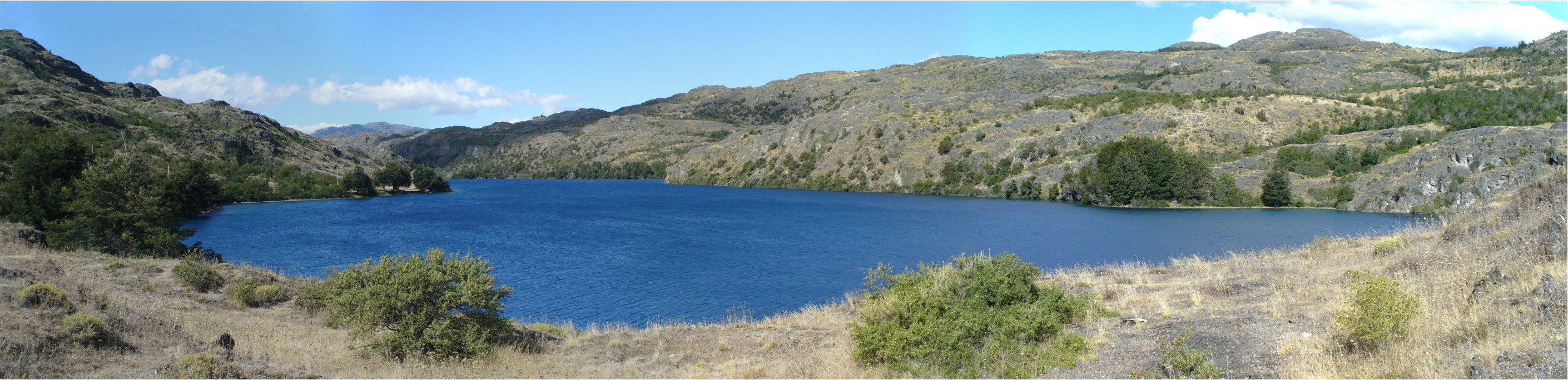

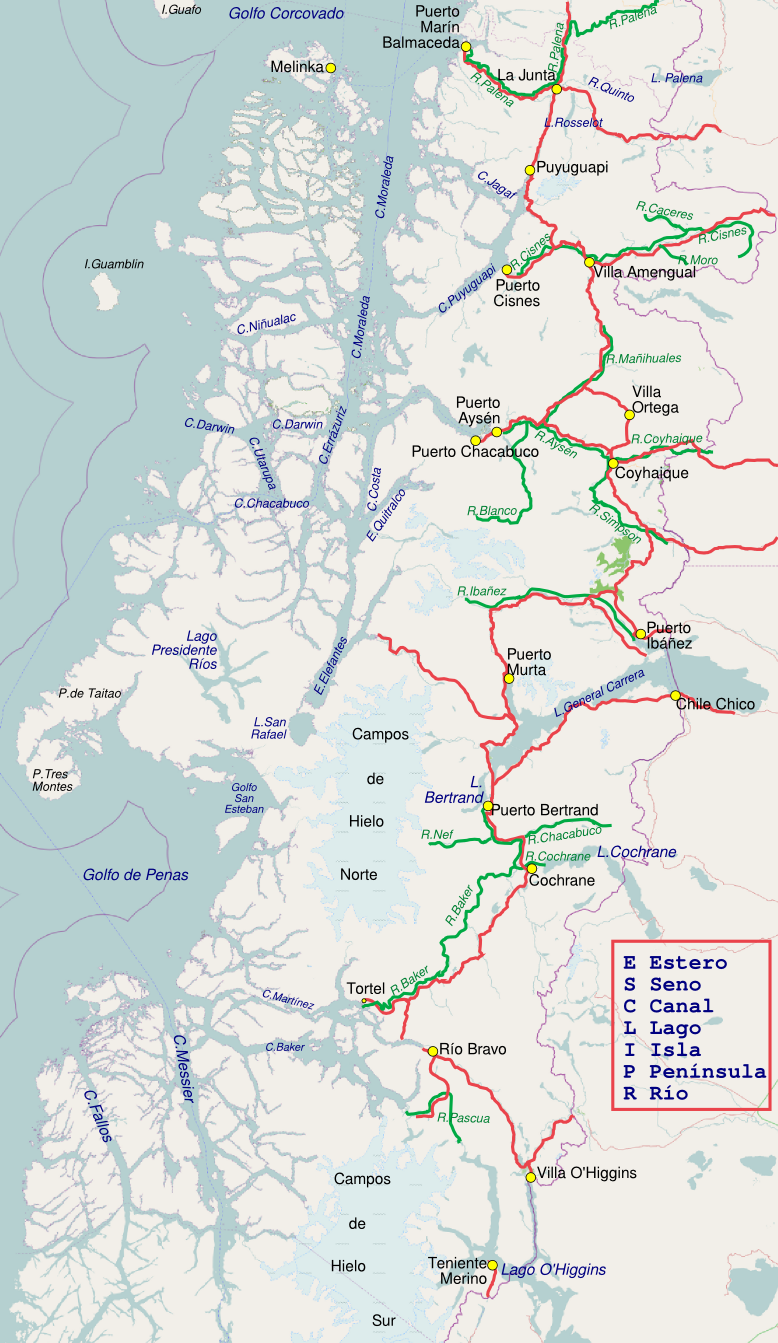
- Cochrane Lake in the Aysén Region

- Location within Argentina
- Interactive map of Pueyrredón/Cochrane Lake
- Location: Cochrane Commune, Capitán Prat Province, Aysén del General Carlos Ibáñez del Campo Region, Chile / Río Chico Department, Santa Cruz Province, Argentina
- Coordinates: 47°16′S 72°03′W
- Primary outflows: Cochrane River
- Catchment area: 2,570 km^{2} (990 sq mi)
- Basin countries: Argentina, Chile
- Max. length: 45 km (28 mi)
- Max. width: 6 km (3.7 mi)
- Surface area: 325 km^{2} (125 sq mi)
- Average depth: 101.8 m (334 ft)
- Max. depth: 460 m (1,510 ft)
- Water volume: 33.09 km^{3} (7.94 cu mi)
- Shore length^{1}: 239 km (149 mi)
- Surface elevation: 153 m (502 ft)
- ^{1} Shore length is not a well-defined measure.

The Pueyrredón/Cochrane Lake is a glacier fed lake located on the eastern edge of the southern Andes, straddling the border between Argentina and Chile. It is named after Lord Cochrane on the Chilean side and Juan Martín de Pueyrredón on the Argentina side. The border is a peninsula that juts out into the lake on the north side. The border to the north of the lake follows the ridgeline of the last major expression of the eastern Andes. The Argentine portion of the lake has a surface of 150 km^{2} (58 sq mi), while the portion in Chile covers 175 km^{2} (68 sq mi).

A narrow land bridge separates the southern end of Lake Pueyrredón from the smaller, shallower Lake Posadas. Its drainage basin is bordered by the Ghio Lake basin to the northeast. Cochrane Lake drains into the Baker River through the short Cochrane River on its western edge. The 12,156 foot (3,706 meter) high Monte San Lorenzo has a small stream named Oro River, originating on its north flank that flows generally northeastward into Lake Pueyrredón. The vast semi-arid Patagonian Plateau lies east of the lake. The Ecker River and the Blanco River cut canyons across the plateau. The former is the main tributary of the Pinturas River.

The town of Cochrane and the Lago Cochrane National Reserve are located in the vicinity of the lake.

A bathymetric survey of the lake was carried out between December 1996 and February 1997, using an Echo Sounder with GPS navigation. The results showed that the central basin of the lake reaches a depth of 460m (1,509 ft). This deep central basin is separated by a shallow sill from a series of small deep basins of just over 200 metres depth, which comprise the western end of the lake.
