= Antonio Piergüidi =

Argentine footballer

Personal information
- Full name: Antonio Piergüidi
- Date of birth: August 25, 1985 (age 41)
- Place of birth: Henderson, Argentina
- Height: 1.72 m (5 ft 8 in)
- Position: Forward

Team information
- Current team: Club Sportivo Estudiantes
- Number: 9

Youth career
- 1994–2005: Gimnasia LP

Senior career*
Years	Team	Apps	(Gls)
2005–2008	Gimnasia LP	48	(8)
2008–2009	Quilmes	13	(0)
2009–2010	Huracán de Comodoro Rivadavia	?	(?)
2010–2011	Club Rivadavia	?	(?)
2011–2012	U. S. Feltreseprealpi	?	(?)
2012–2013	Barracas Central	?	(?)
2013–2014	Huracán de San Rafael	?	(?)
2014–2015	Deportivo Maipú	?	(?)
2015–	Club Sportivo Estudiantes	?	(?)
- * Club domestic league appearances and goals as of 20:15, 3 October 2009 (UTC)

Antonio Piergüidi (born 25 August 1985 in Henderson, Buenos Aires Province, Argentina), is a football forward who most recently played for Quilmes in the Argentine 2nd division.

Piergüidi made 43 league appearances for Gimnasia y Esgrima de La Plata between 2006 and 2008, scoring 8 goals.
