= Bertrand Lake =

Lake in Chile

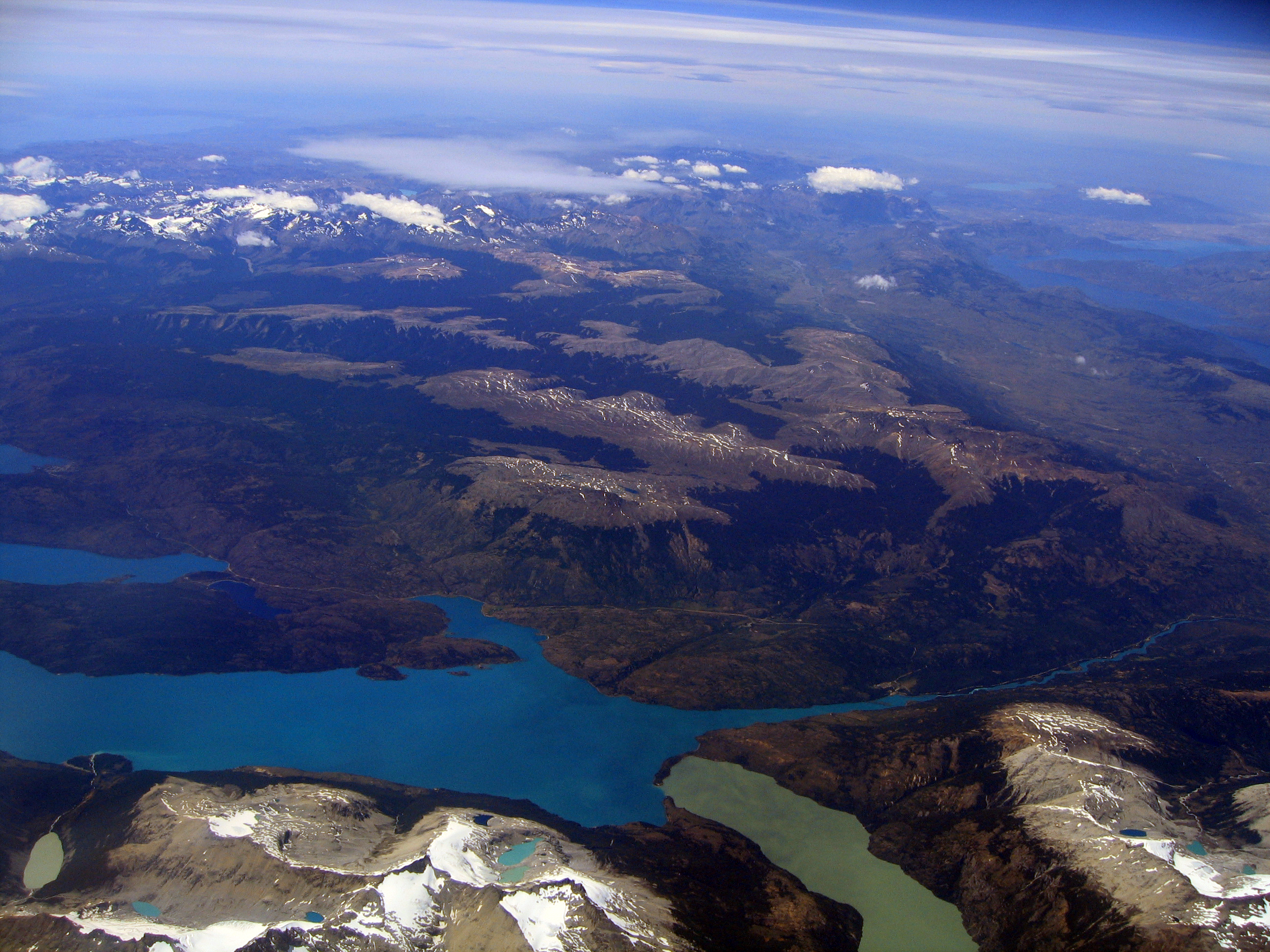
- Bertrand Lake and grey-watered Plomo Lake

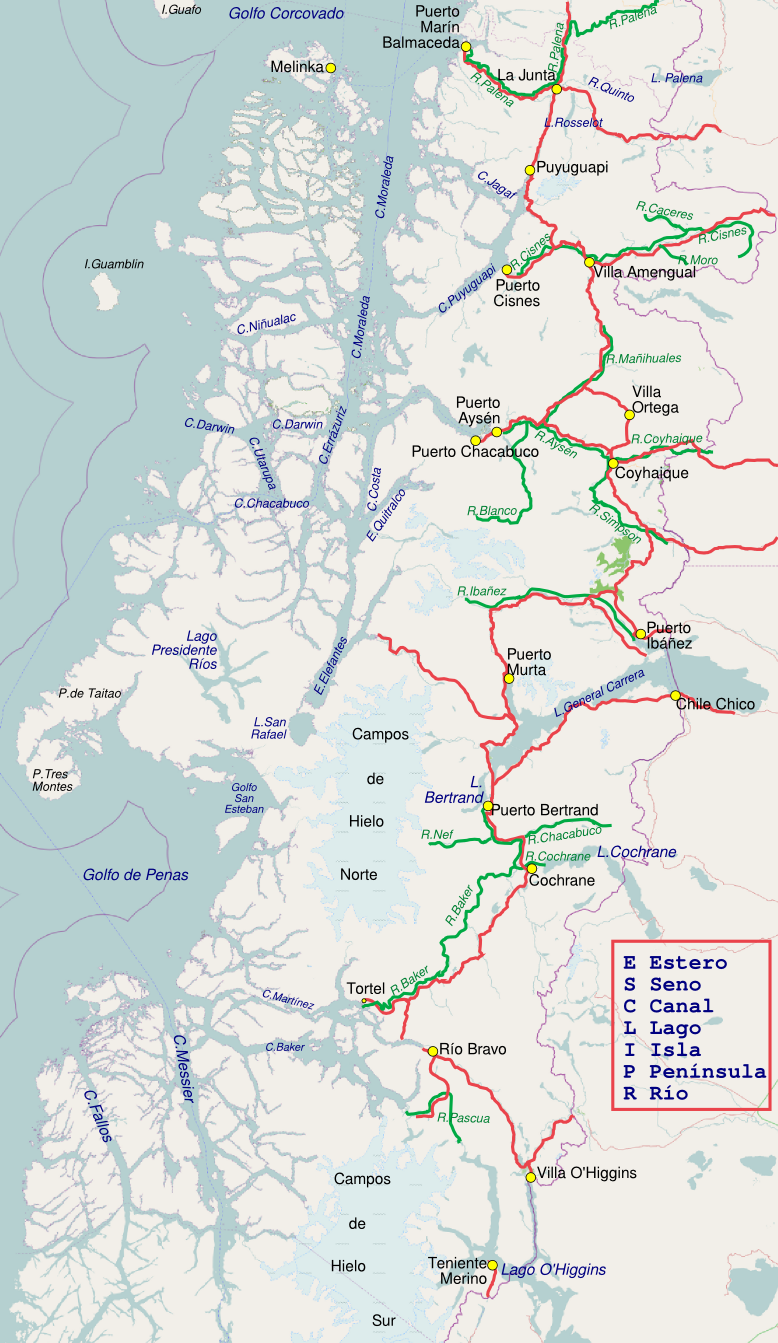
- Bertrand Lake in the Aysén Region

- Location within Chile
- Interactive map of Bertrand Lake
- Coordinates: 46°55′S 72°50′W
- Primary inflows: General Carrera Lake
- Primary outflows: Baker River
- Basin countries: Chile
- Surface area: 67.5 km^{2} (26.1 sq mi)

Bertrand Lake is a Chilean lake located in the Aysén del General Carlos Ibáñez del Campo Region. It is separated from Plomo Lake by a terminal moraine and is flanked on the west by the summits of the Cordón Contreras.

The village of Puerto Bertrand is located at the southern tip of the lake, where Baker River originates.
