= Río Olnie =

Coordinates: 49°48′S 68°37′W

- Municipality and town
- Interactive map of Río Olnie
- Country: Argentina
- Province: Santa Cruz Province
- Department: Río Chico Department, Santa Cruz
- Time zone: UTC−3 (ART)

Río Olnie is a town and municipality in Santa Cruz Province in southern Argentina.
