= Henderson, Argentina =

Town in Buenos Aires Province, Argentina

Henderson
- Location in Argentina
- Coordinates: 36°17′S 61°43′W
- Country: Argentina
- Province: Buenos Aires
- Partido: Hipolito Yrigoyen
- Elevation: 105 m (344 ft)

Population (2010 census [INDEC])
  - Total: 9,585
- CPA Base: B 6465
- Area code: +54 02314

Henderson is a town in Buenos Aires Province, Argentina. It is the administrative centre for Hipolito Yrigoyen Partido.

The economy of the town and locality is dominated by agriculture and farming.

== Notable people ==
- Claudio Caniggia, former footballer
- Antonio Piergüidi, former footballer

== Radio and TV ==
- FM Bangkok 91.9 MHz. - LRI 968
- FM Amanecer 92.5 MHz. - LRI 970
- FM Color 96.7
- FM Luz de mi ciudad 100.1
- TL2 - Canal 2 Cablevisión
