= Cochrane River =

Coordinates: 47.25°S 72.50°W

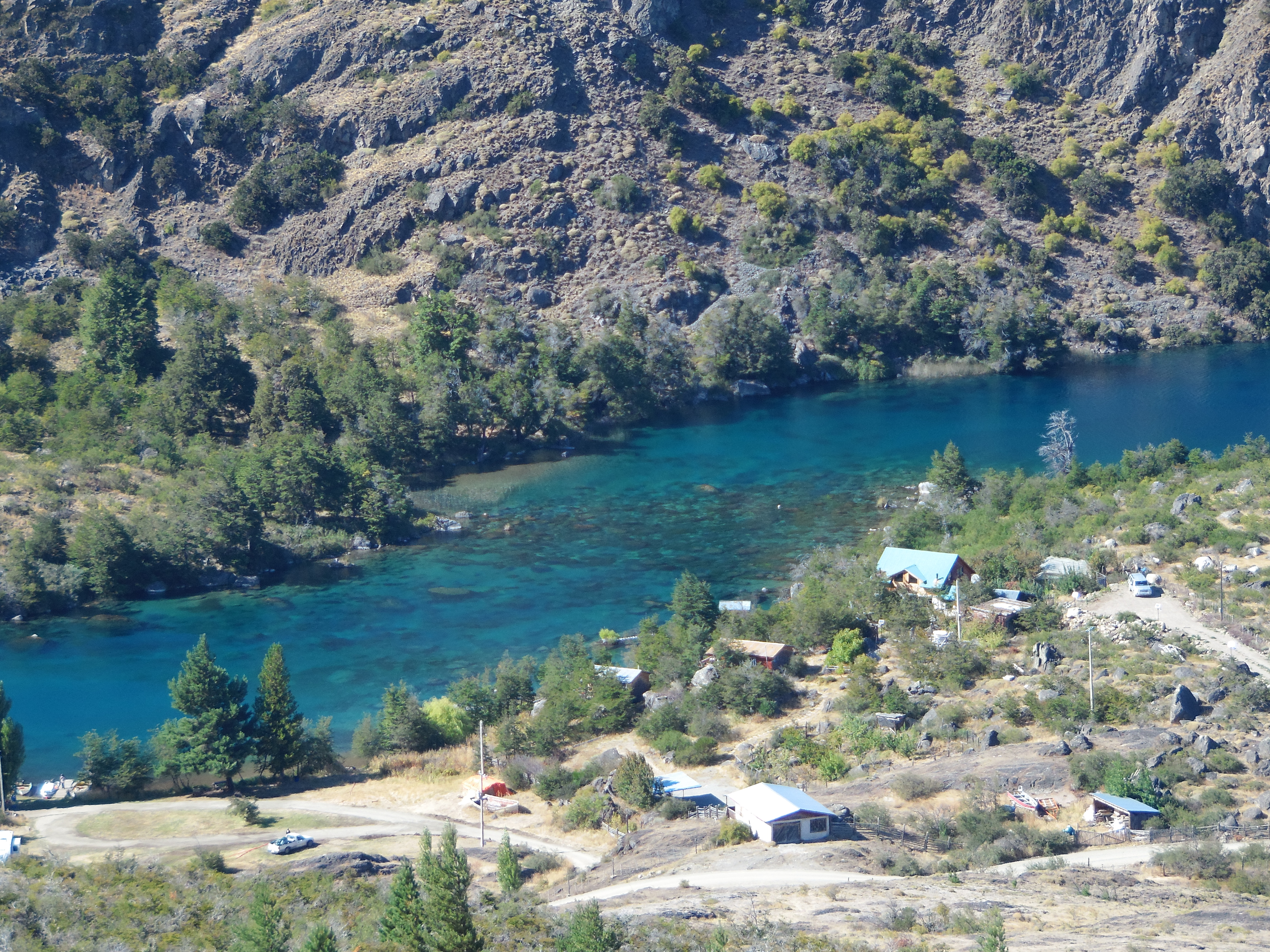

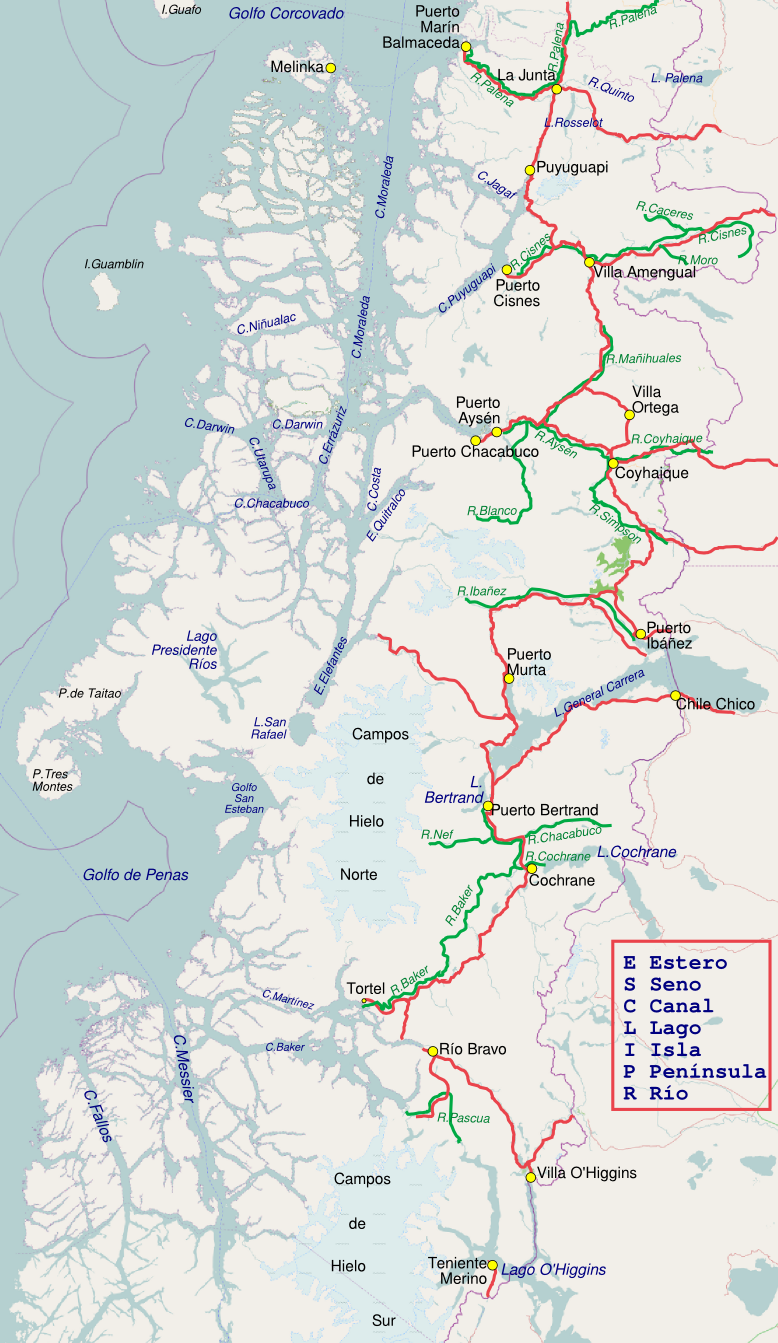
- Cochrane River in the Aysén Region

Location
- Country: Chile

Physical characteristics
- Source
  - location: Cochrane Lake
- Mouth
  - location: Baker River
- Length: 11 mi (18 km)

The Cochrane River is a short river of Chile located in the Aysén del General Carlos Ibáñez del Campo Region. It is the outlet of Cochrane Lake and empties into the Baker River. The town of Cochrane is situated along the river.

The Cochrane River was named after Thomas Cochrane, 10th Earl of Dundonald who served in the Chilean Navy during the war of independence.

== See also ==
- List of rivers of Chile
