= Baker River (Chile) =

Coordinates: 47°01′24″S 72°49′47″W

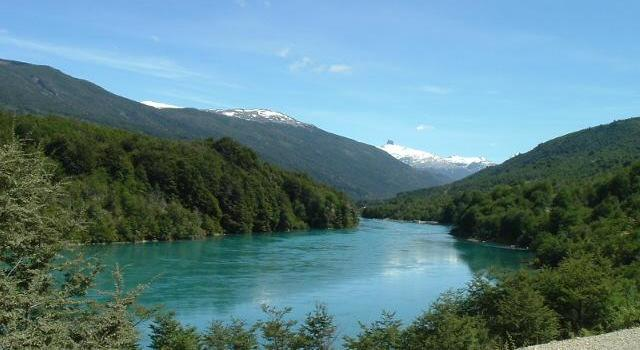

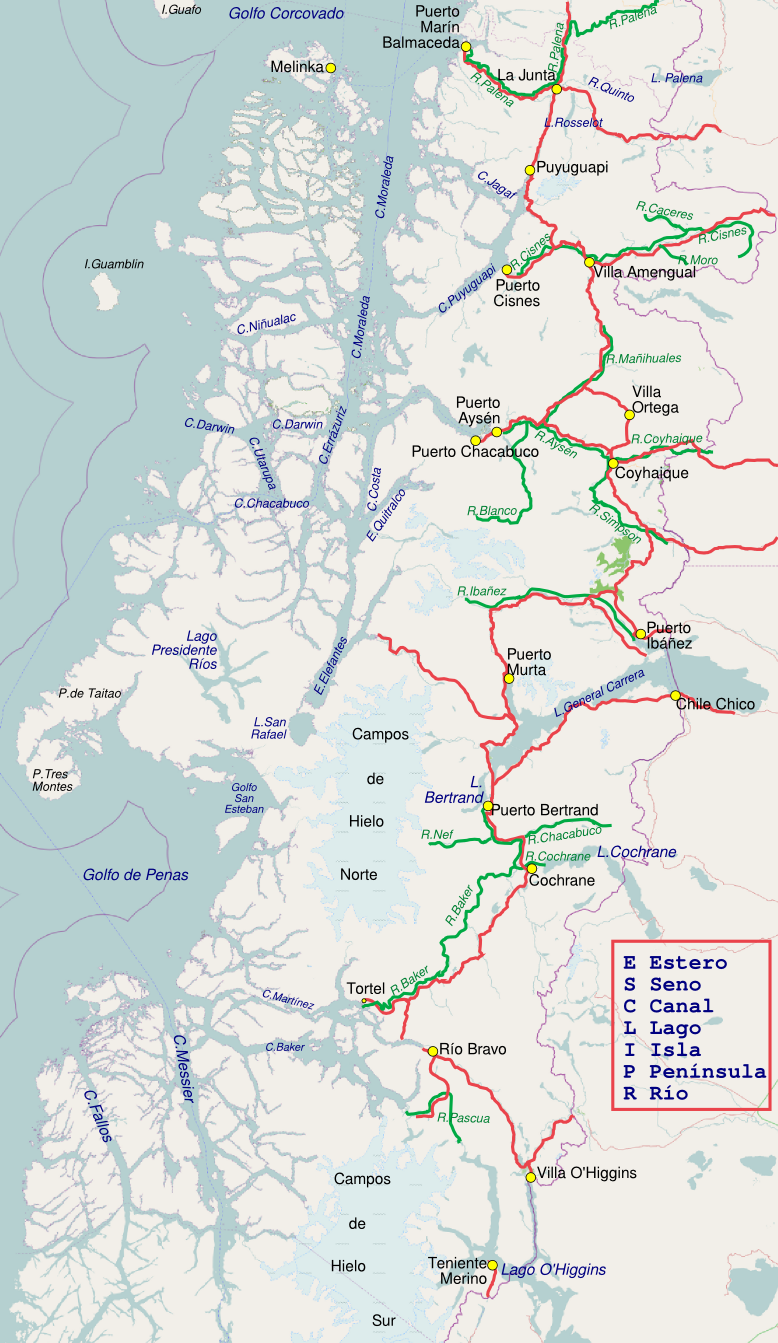
- Baker River in the Aysén Region

Location
- Countries: Chile; Argentina

Physical characteristics
- Source
  - location: Bertrand Lake
  - elevation: 200 m (660 ft)
- Mouth
  - location: Baker Channel, Pacific Ocean
- Length: 170 km (110 mi)
- Basin size: 26,726 km^{2} (10,319 sq mi)
- Discharge
  - average: 875 m^{3}/s (30,900 cu ft/s)

The Baker River is a river located in the Aysén del General Carlos Ibáñez del Campo Region of the Chilean Patagonia. It is Chile's largest river in terms of volume of water. The river flows out of Bertrand Lake, which is fed by General Carrera Lake. It runs along the east side of the Northern Patagonian Ice Field and empties into the Pacific Ocean, near the town of Caleta Tortel. The river forms a delta, dividing into two major arms, of which only the northernmost one is navigable.

Its characteristic turquoise-blue color is due to the glacial sediments deposited in it.

It was the proposed site of a controversial major hydro-electric project, involving five dams, to be the biggest in the history of Chile. Called HidroAysén, the project was a joint venture between Endesa Chile a subsidiary of the international energy conglomerate Enel, and Colbún S.A. a subsidiary of Minera Valparaíso. The series of hydro-electric dams were proposed along both the Baker and Pascua rivers, two of Chile's mightiest rivers. The project was opposed by a protest campaign led by Chilean and international environmental activist groups. Few rivers this large in the world remain undammed and free flowing. Chile's Committee of Ministers overturned the environmental permits for the HidroAysén dam project June 2014.

== Etymology ==
The river is named after Sir Thomas Baker, a British admiral and commander of the South America Station.

== Tributaries ==
The river also receives the waters of the Cochrane Lake through the Cochrane River. Other major tributaries are:

- Nef River
- Chacabuco River
- Del Salto River
- Colonia River
- De los Ñadis River
- Ventisquero River
- Vargas River

== Gallery ==
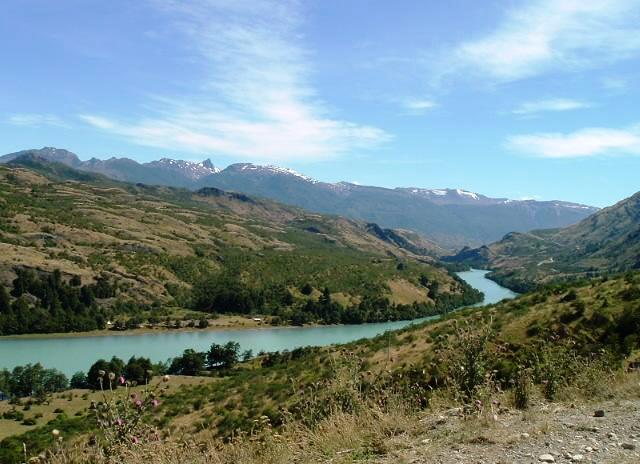
Kayaking is a popular sport on the river.

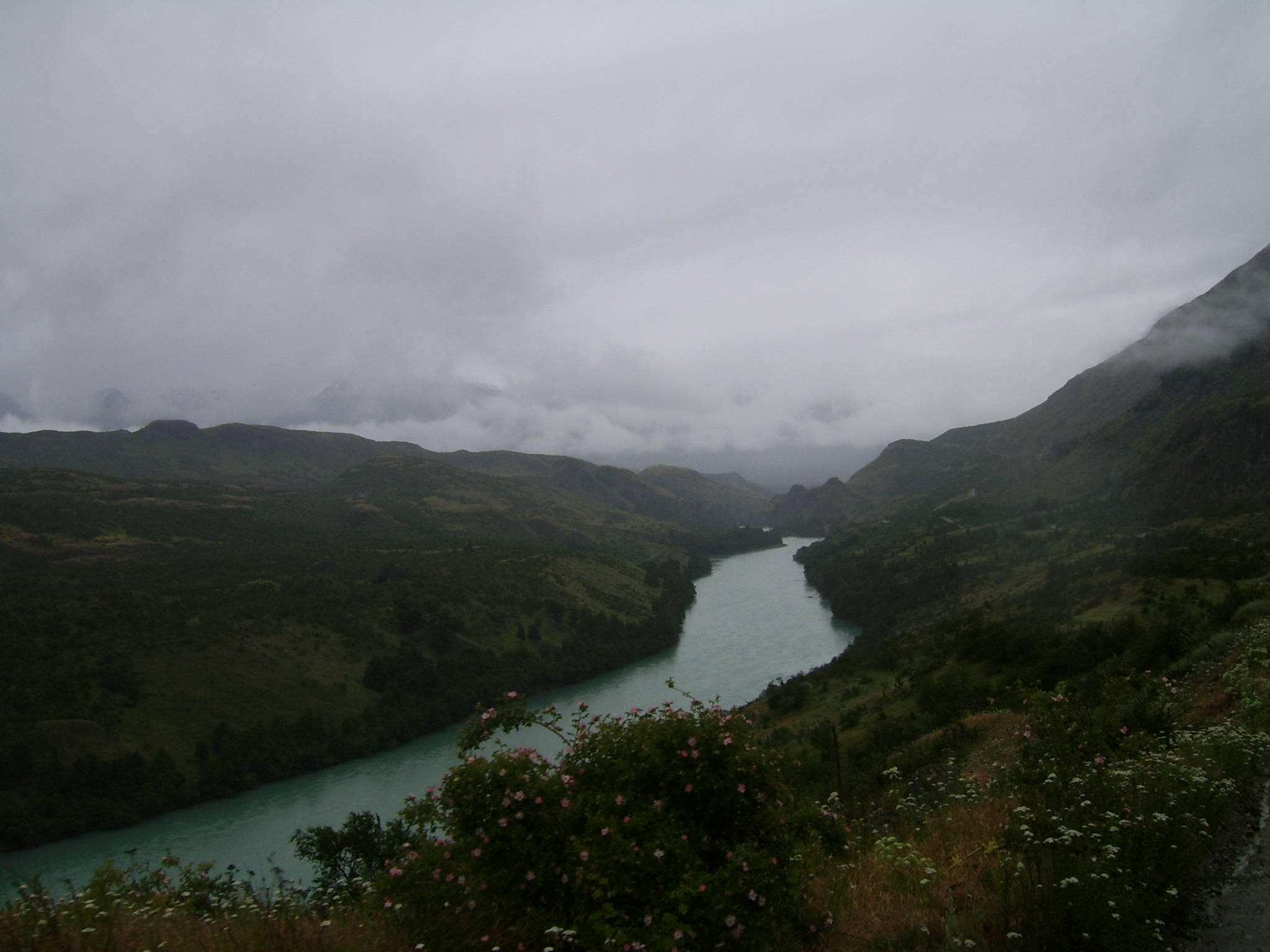
Winter 2006

== See also ==
- List of rivers of Chile
- Pinturas River
