= William Irigoyen =

French journalist (born 1970)

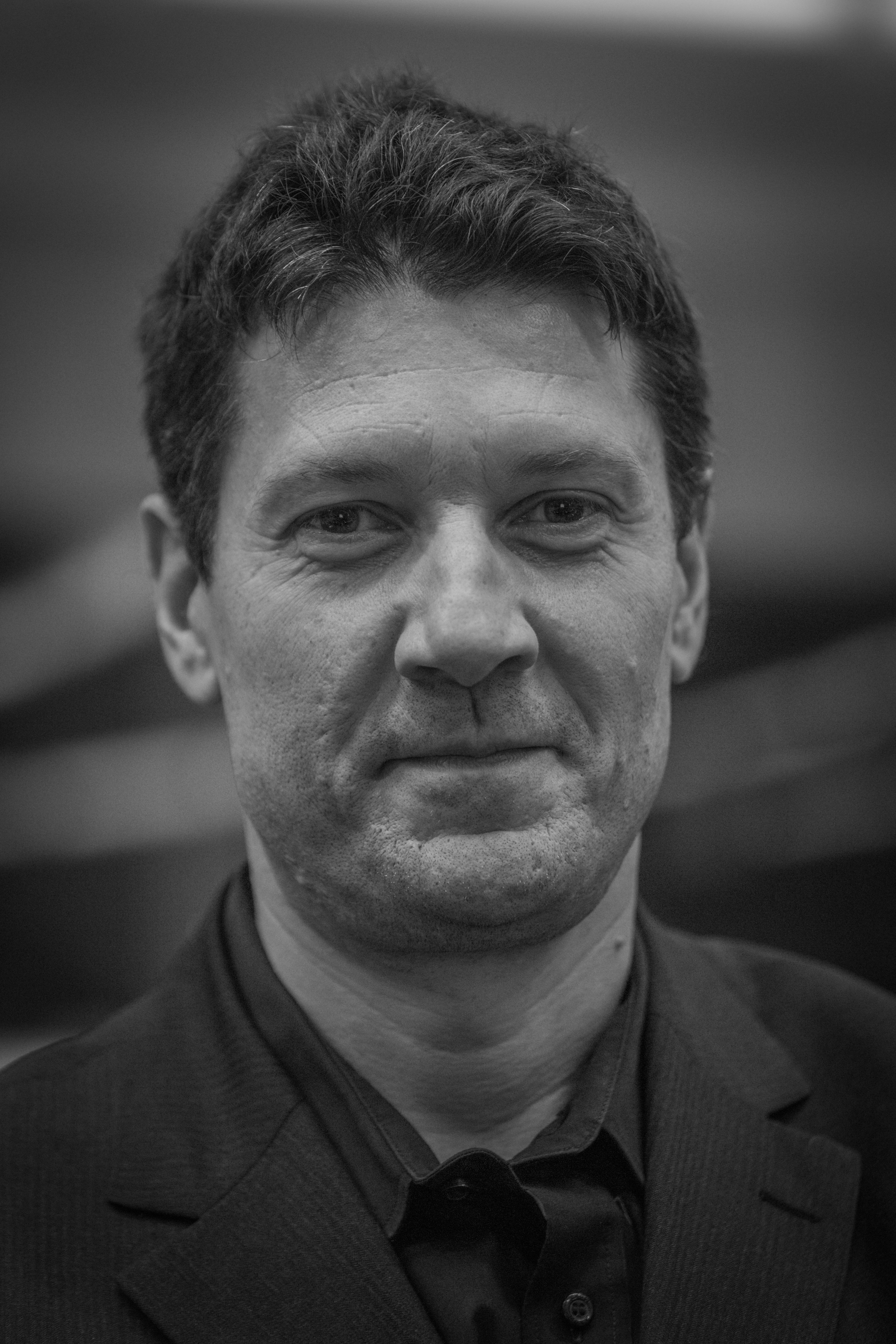
- William Irigoyen in 2013
- Born: 9 February 1970 (age 56); Villecresnes, France
- Education: Paris-Sorbonne University; CELSA Paris
- Occupation: Journalist
- Employer: Arte

William Irigoyen (9 February 1970, Villecresnes in Val-de-Marne) is a French journalist working for the TV channel Arte.

== Parcours ==
After studying German and journalism at CELSA Paris, William Irigoyen became editor-reporter for France 2 and France 3, both channels of the France Télévisions group.

He also produced reports for the monthly Grand Reportage. In 1998, he joined the editorial staff of France 2, where he was a journalist-reporter for two years.

In 2001, he left France 2 for the Franco-German cultural channel Arte, where he presented for ten years Arte Info, which later became Arte Journal each evening of the week at 19:45, alternating with the German journalist Jürgen Biehle.

Since January 2012, he presents Arte Reportage alternating with Andrea Fies.
