= Nef River =

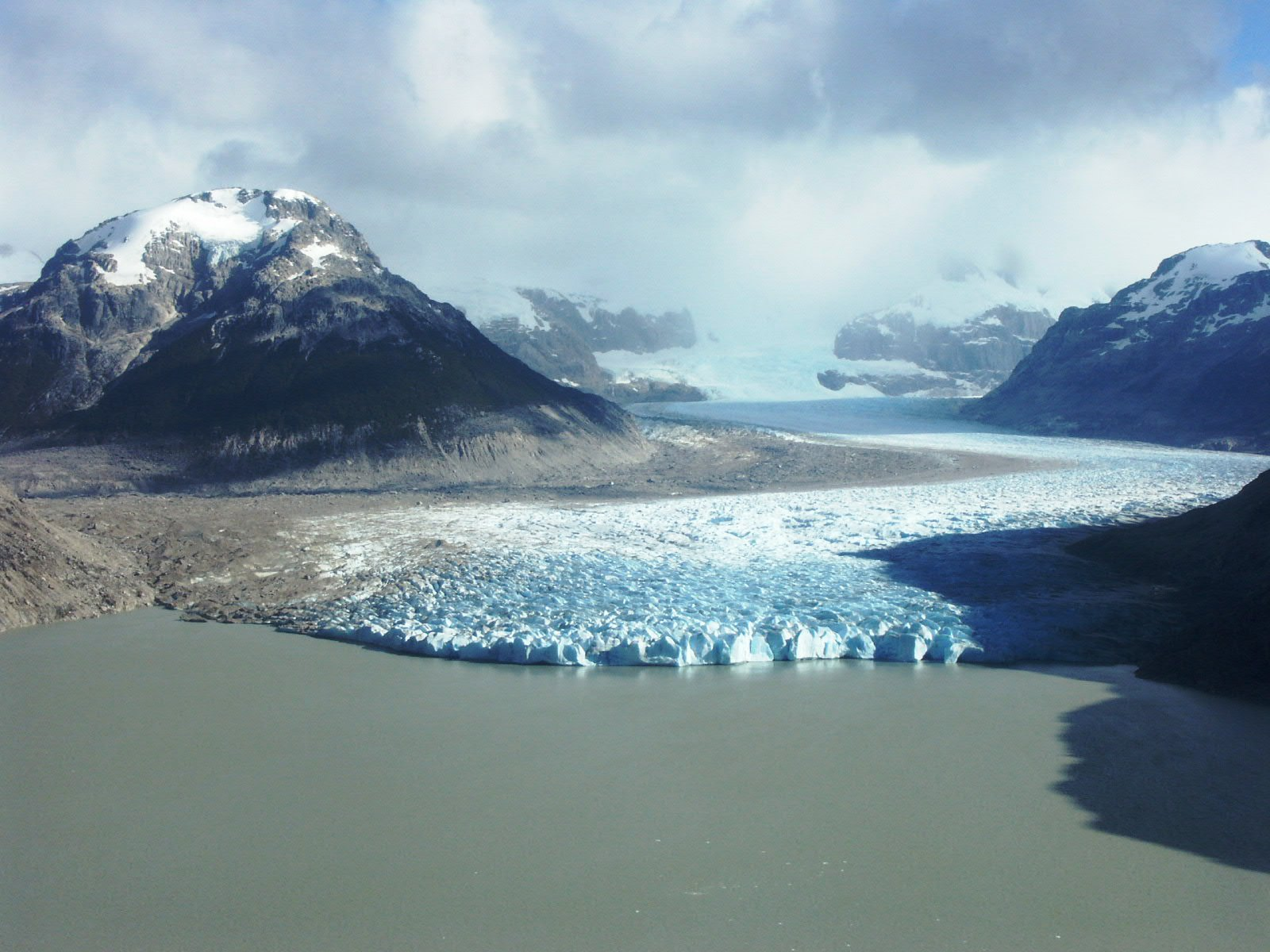

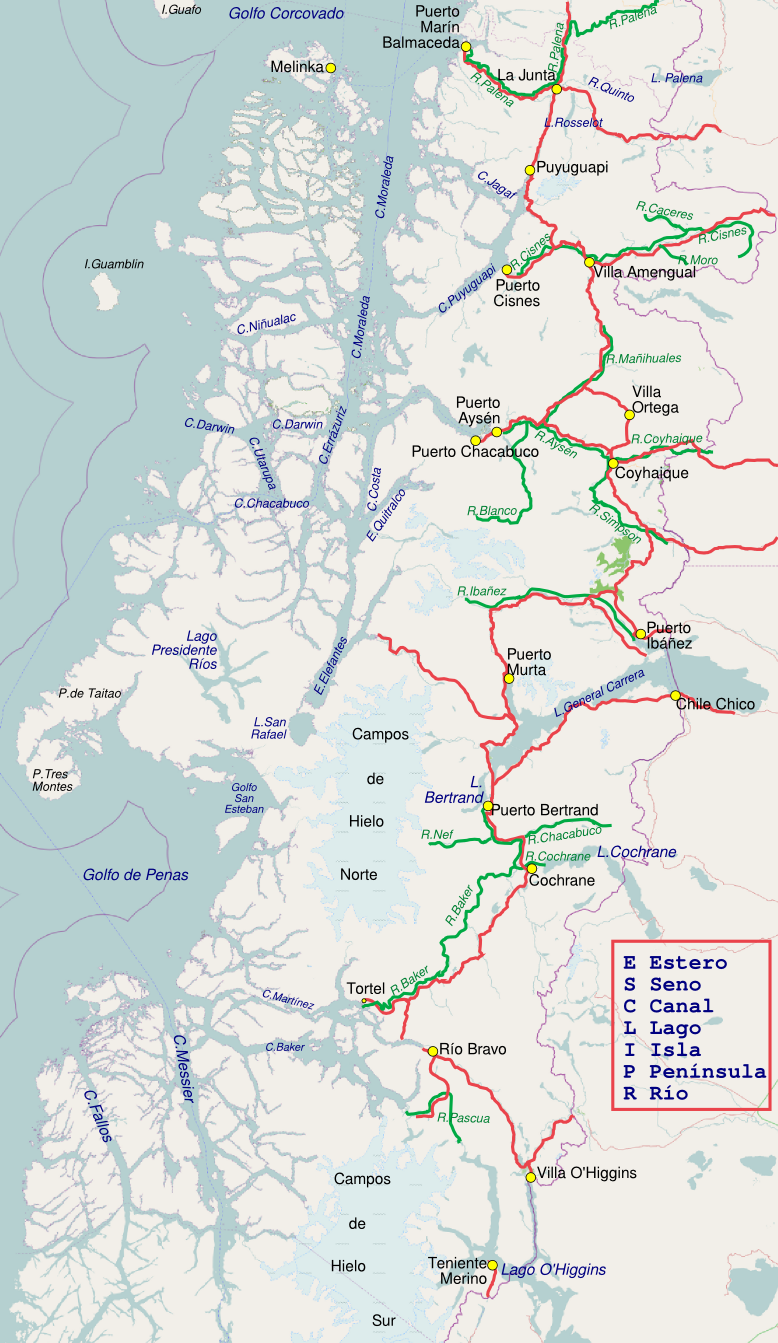
- Nef River in the Aysén Region

Location
- Country: Chile

The Nef River is a river of Chile. The river is 30 kn and has its source at a proglacial lake (Northern Ice Fields) which is fed by the Nef Glacier. It flows in a generally easterly direction until it discharges into the Baker River. The confluence of the Nef and Baker is a popular destination with beautiful views of the waters.

== See also ==
- List of rivers of Chile
