= Río Chico Department, Santa Cruz =

Río Chico
- Department
- Location of Río Chico Department in Santa Cruz Province.
- Country: Argentina
- Province: Santa Cruz
- Seat: Gobernador Gregores

Area
  - Total: 34,262 km^{2} (13,229 sq mi)

Population
  - Total: 6,314

Río Chico Department is a department in Santa Cruz Province, Argentina. It has an area of 34,262 km^{2} and had a population of 6,314 at the 2022 Census. Cardiel Lake is located in this department. The seat of the department is in Gobernador Gregores.

== Municipalities and communes ==
- Bajo Caracoles
- Gobernador Gregores
- Hipólito Yrigoyen
- Río Olnie

== Demography ==
According to the 2022 Census from INDEC the population of the department is 6,314.

Table with the demographic evolution of the Río Chico Department according to the national censuses and the variation between censuses in percentage:

	1947	1960	1970	1980	1991	2001	2010	2022
Population	2,588	1,960	2,256	2,063	2,654	2,926	5,158	6,314
Variation	-	-24.26%	+15.10%	-8.55%	+28.64%	+10.25%	+76.28%	+22.41%

Source: Instituto Nacional de Estadísticas y Censos, INDEC
