= Hipólito Yrigoyen, Santa Cruz =

Coordinates: 49°47′S 68°37′W

Lago Posadas (Santa Cruz)
- Municipality and village
- Interactive map of Lago Posadas (Santa Cruz)
- Country: Argentina
- Province: Santa Cruz Province
- Department: Río Chico Department, Santa Cruz
- Time zone: UTC−3 (ART)

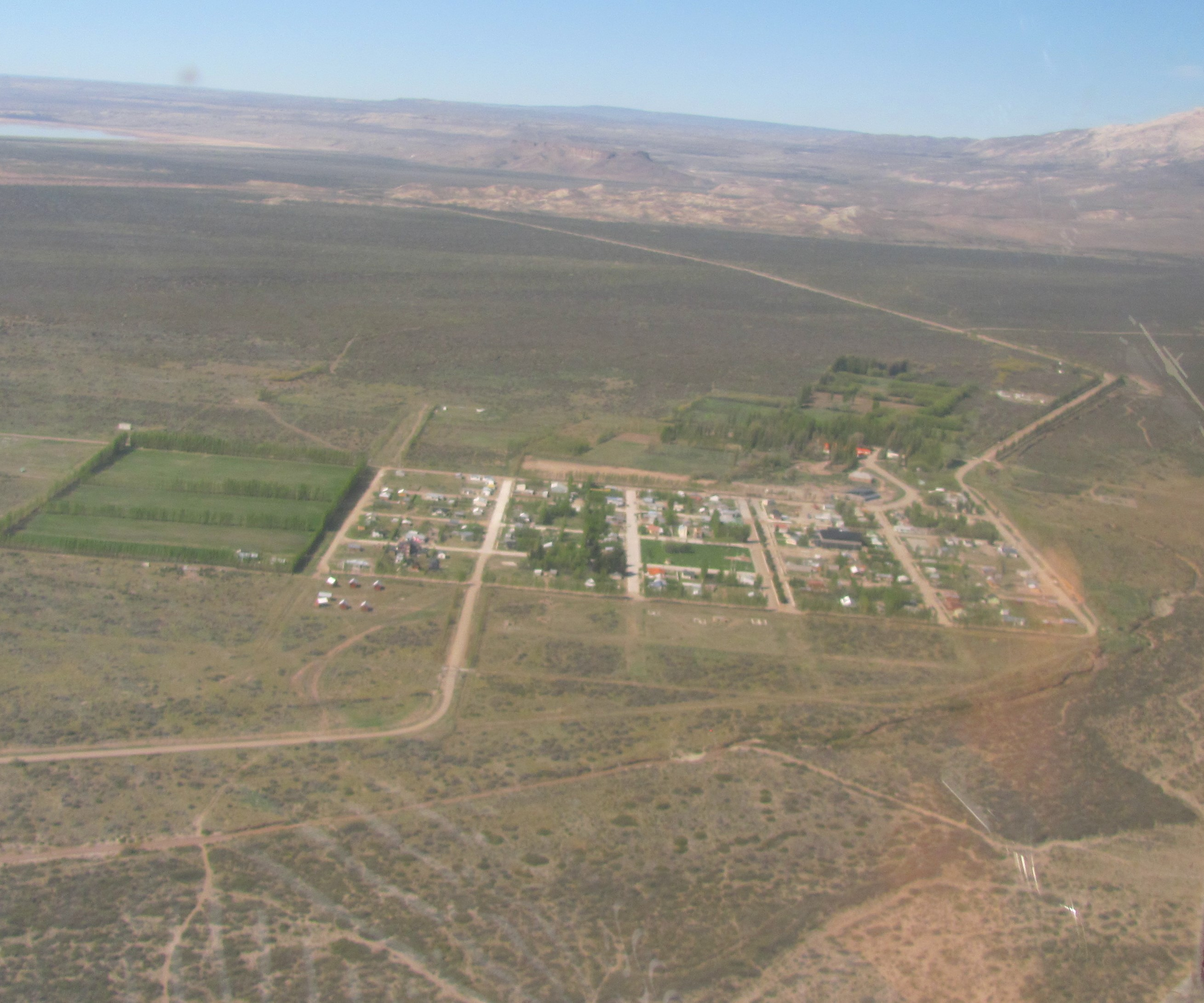
Lago Posadas

Lago Posadas (formerly Hipólito Yrigoyen) is a village and municipality in Santa Cruz Province in southern Argentina.
