= Hipólito Yrigoyen Partido =

Hipólito Yrigoyen Partido de Hipólito Yrigoyen
- Department
- Coat of arms

- Coordinates: 36°17′S 61°43′W
- Country: Argentina
- Founder: Provincial decree
- Seat: Henderson

Government
  - Intendant: Luis Pugnanoli (PJ)

Area
  - Total: 1,664 km^{2} (642 sq mi)

Population
  - Total: 8,819
  - Density: 5.300/km^{2} (13.73/sq mi)
- Demonym: yrigoyense
- Postal Code: B6465
- IFAM: BUE059
- Area Code: 02314

Hipólito Yrigoyen Partido is a county (partido) in Buenos Aires Province, it is located near the centre of the province in central Argentina at coordinates 36°17′S 61°43′W.

The provincial subdivision has a population of 8,819 inhabitants in an area of 1,664 km^{2} (642 sq mi), and its administrative centre is Henderson, which is located 460 km (286 mi) from Buenos Aires.

People from Hipólito Yrigoyen Partido are known as yrigoyense.

== Name ==
The name was chosen as a tribute to Hipólito Yrigoyen, who was President of Argentina from 1916 to 1922 and again from 1928 to 1930.

== Settlements ==
- Henderson
- Herrera Vegas
