= Colonia River =

River in Chile

Coordinates: 47.3031°S 72.8722°W

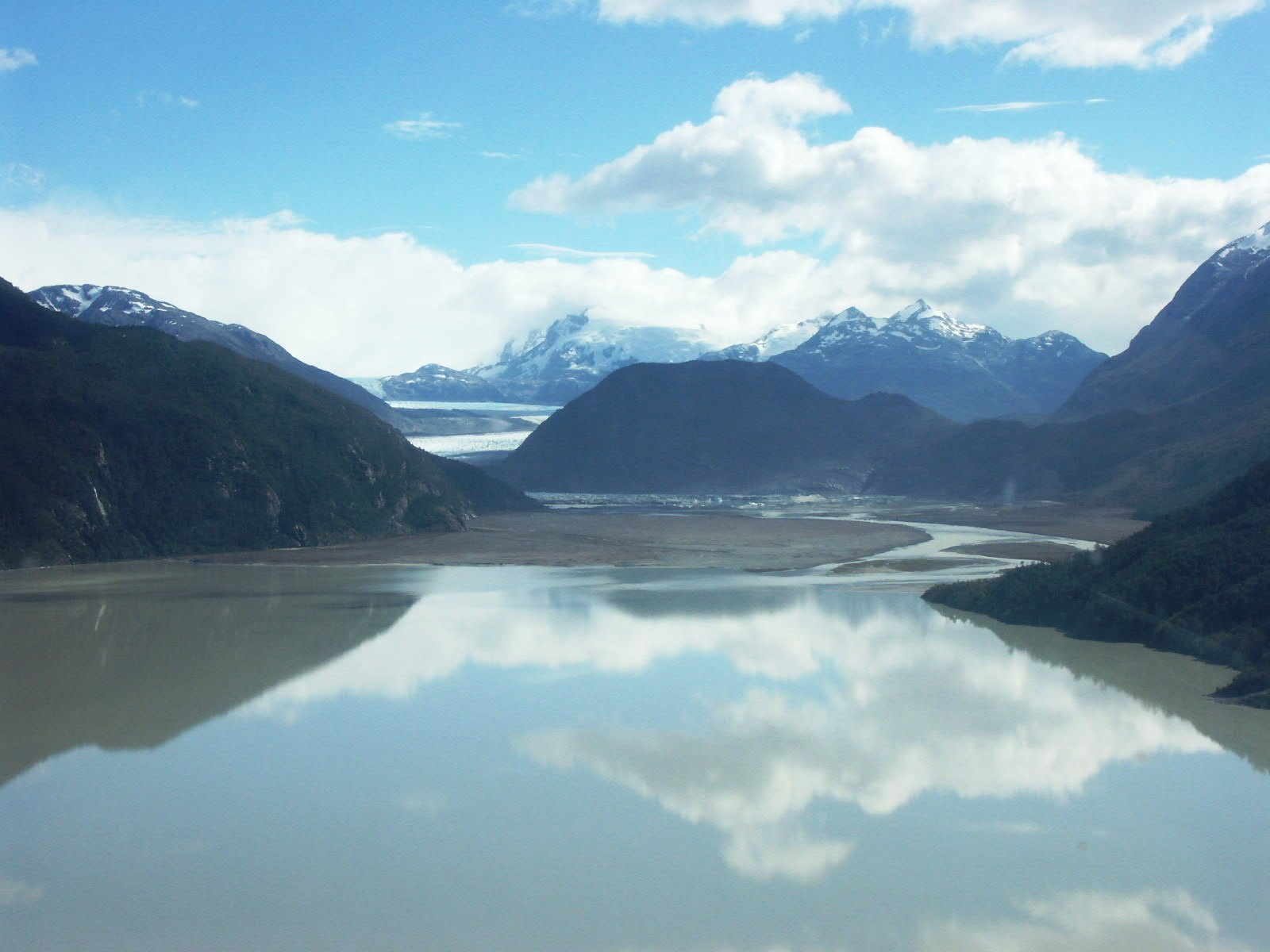

Location
- Country: Chile

The Colonia River is a river located in Aisén, Chile.

== See also ==
- List of rivers of Chile
