= Hipólito Yrigoyen, Salta =

Hipólito Yrigoyen (Salta)
- Municipality and town
- Location within Salta Province
- Coordinates: 23°14′45″S 64°16′26″W
- Country: Argentina
- Province: Salta Province
- Department: Orán Department
- Time zone: UTC−3 (ART)

Hipólito Yrigoyen (Salta) is a town and municipality in Salta Province in northwestern Argentina.
