= Hipólito Yrigoyen, Misiones =

Coordinates: 27°05′S 55°17′W

Hipólito Yrigoyen (Misiones)
- Municipality and village
- Interactive map of Hipólito Yrigoyen (Misiones)
- Country: Argentina
- Province: Misiones Province
- Time zone: UTC−3 (ART)

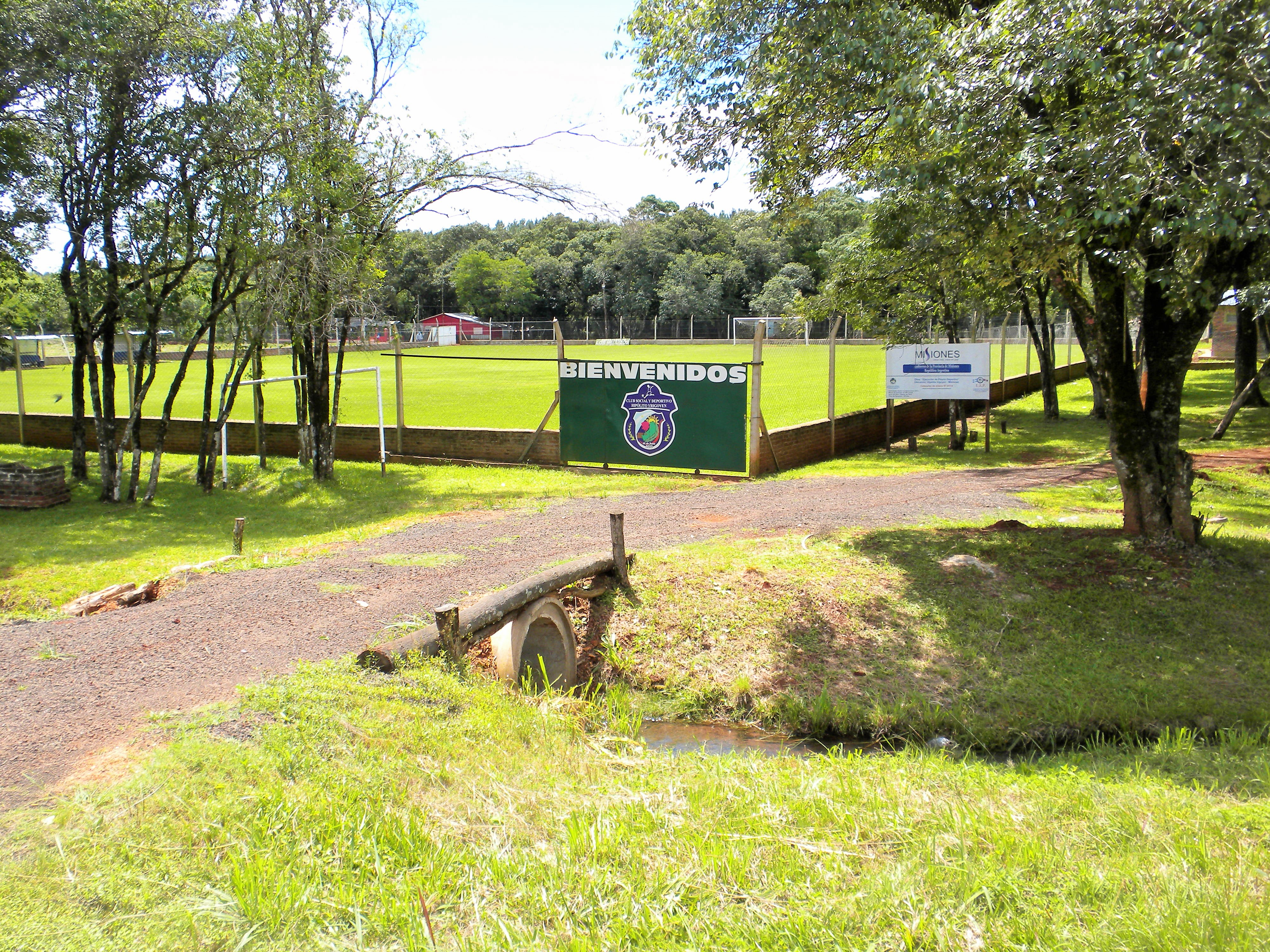
Hipólito Yrigoyen, Misiones

Hipólito Yrigoyen (Misiones) is a village and municipality in Misiones Province in north-eastern Argentina.
